= List of Sri Lankan films of the 1970s =

Films produced in Sri Lanka in the 1970s.

== 1970 ==
Title	Director	Cast	Genre	Notes
1970
Lakseta Kodiya	Shesha Palihakkara	Joe Abeywickrama, Alfred Perera, A. P. Gunaratne, Sobani Amarasinghe, Samuel Rodrigo, Chandra Kaluarachchi, Thilakasiri Fernando	Drama	Released on 29 January.
Sumudu Bharya	Cyril P. Abeyratne	Roy de Silva, Jeevarani Kurukulasuriya, Nelson Karunagama, Sumana Amarasinghe, Lilian Edirisinghe, Don Sirisena, Hilda Agnes	Adult	Released on 4 February.
Dan Mathakada	Neil Rupasinghe	Malini Fonseka, Ananda Jayaratne, Senadheera Rupasinghe, Dommie Jayawardena, Hugo Fernando, Anthony C. Perera, Bandu Munasinghe, Sumana Amarasinghe	Drama	Released on 17 March.
Akkara Paha	Lester James Peries	Milton Jayawardena, Anoma Wattaladeniya, Malini Fonseka, Janaki Kurukulasuriya, Gamini Wijesuriya, Shanthi Lekha, Douglas Ranasinghe	Drama	Released on 8 May.
Aathma Pooja	M. Masthan	Gamini Fonseka, Clarice De Silva, H. D. Kulatunga, Dommie Jayawardena, Senadheera Rupasinghe, Nelson Karunagama, Anthony C. Perera, Shanthi Lekha	Drama	Released on 18 May.
Thewatha	Titus Thotawatte	Joe Abeywickrama, Iranganie Serasinghe, Francis Perera, Nihal Jayawardena, Anthony C. Perera, Pearl Vasudevi, B. S. Perera	Drama	Released on 16 June.
Geetha	Jo Dev Ananda	Roy de Silva, Janaki Kurukulasuriya, H. R. Jothipala, Mabel Blythe, Dharma Sri Ranatunga, Stanley Perera, Nita Fernando, Don Sirisena	Romance	Released on 15 July.
Penawa Neda	Wijepala Hettiarachchi	Tony Ranasinghe, Anula Karunathilaka, Sriyani Amarasena, Robin Fernando, Oswald Jayasinghe, Lilian Edirisinghe, D. R. Nanayakkara	Drama	Released on 7 August.
Sidadiyen Hayak	Shanthi Abeysekara	Padma Siriwardena, Shanthi Abeysekara, Ralph Wijesekara, Asoka Hewawitharana, M. P. Gemunu, Joe Livera, Sathischandra Edirisinghe, Saranapala Suriarachchi	Drama	Released on 26 August.
Priyanga	Amaranath Jayathilake	Vijaya Kumaratunga, Kanthi Lanka, Sriyani Amarasena, Iranganie Serasinghe, Wijeratne Warakagoda, G. W. Surendra, S. A. Jamis	Romance	Released on 20 September.
Ohoma Hondada	J. Selvarathnam	Gamini Fonseka, Sonia Disa, Robin Fernando, Freddie Silva, B. S. Perera, Baptist Fernando, D. R. Nanayakkara, Hugo Fernando	Comedy	Released on 11 October.
Thun Man Handiya	Mahagama Sekera	Joe Abeywickrama, Denawaka Hamine, Shanthi Lekha, Kumara Balasooriya, Dharmadasa Kuruppu, Gemunu Wijesuriya, Somasiri Dehipitiya, Swarna Mallawarachchi	Drama	Released on 24 October.
Nim Walalla	Ranjith Lal	Nissanka Amarasinghe, Janaki Kurukulasuriya, Swarna Mallawarachchi, Tissa Wijesurendra, Rukmani Devi, Cyril Wickramage, Piyadasa Gunasekera	Drama	Released on 18 November.
Ves Gaththo	Vasantha Obeysekera	Cyril Wickremage, Namel Weeramuni, Somasiri Dehipitiya, Wimal Kumara de Costa, Daya Thennakoon, Prema Ganegoda, Lucien Bulathsinhala	Drama	Released on 10 December.
Suli Sulang	Anton Fernando	Vijitha Mallika, Wally Nanayakkara, Hugo Fernando, H. D. Kulatunga, D. R. Nanayakkara, Leena Fernando, Anthony C. Perera	Drama	Released on 24 December.

== 1971 ==
Title	Director	Cast	Genre	Notes
1971
Poojithayo	W.A.B. de Silva	Stanley Perera, Wally Nanayakkara, H. D. Kulatunga, Nilanthi Wijesinghe, Swarna Kahawita, Tissa Wijesurendra, Lionel Deraniyagala	Drama	Released on 14 January.
Dewena Pipasa	Timothy Weerarathne	Robin Fernando, Nilanthi Wijesinghe, Shane Gunaratne, Roy de Silva, Stanley Perera, Piyadasa Gunasekera, Piyadasa Wijekoon, Thalatha Gunasekara	Action	Released on 11 February.
Kalana Mithuro	Kingsley Rajapaksa	Wickrama Bogoda, Neela Liyanagedara, Tissa Wijesurendra, Tony Ranasinghe, D. R. Nanayakkara, Eddie Jayamanne, Dommie Jayawardena	Drama	Released on 3 March.
Ran Onchilla	Dharmasiri Caldera	Vijaya Kumaranatunga, Swarna Kahawita, Lionel Deraniyagala, Robin Fernando, Nita Fernando, Senadheera Rupasinghe, Shane Gunaratne	Drama	Released on 14 March.
Kathuru Muwath	K. A. W. Perera	Oswald Jayasinghe, Neela Liyanagedara, Janaki Kurukulasuriya, D. R. Nanayakkara, Senadheera Rupasinghe, Rex Kodippili, Don Sirisena, Ruby de Mel	Drama	Released on 20 June.
Hathara Denama Soorayo	Neil Rupasinghe	Gamini Fonseka, Sriyani Amarasena, Vijaya Kumaranatunga, Malini Fonseka, Senadheera Rupasinghe, Anthony C. Perera, Lionel Deraniyagala	Action	Released on 20 July.
Abhirahasa	Lenin Moraes	Vijaya Kumaranatunga, Swarna Kahawita, Robin Fernando, Thalatha Gunasekara, Basil de Saram, Sampath Sri Nandalochana, Wally Nanayakkara	Mystery	Released on 4 August.
Kesara Sinhayo	Roland Amarasinghe	Vijaya Kumaranatunga, Nita Fernando, Lionel Deraniyagala, Piyadasa Wijekoon, Dayananda Jayawardena, Priyanka Perera, Anusha Geethanjali	Action	Released on 28 August.
Seeye Nottuwa	K. A. W. Perera	Oswald Jayasinghe, Sriyani Amarasena, Joe Abeywickrama, Rukmani Devi, D. R. Nanayakkara, Shanthi Lekha, Anthony C. Perera, B. S. Perera	Drama	Released on 17 September.
Bindunu Hadawath	Louie Vanderstraeten	Vijaya Kumaranatunga, Nita Fernando, Robin Fernando, Chandra Kala, Denawaka Hamine, Devika Karunaratne	Romance	Released on 22 October.
Welikathara	D.B. Nihalsinghe	Gamini Fonseka, Joe Abeywickrama, Suvineetha Weerasinghe, Devika Karunaratne, Kithsiri Perera, Piyasena Ahangama, Nawanandana Wijesinghe	Drama	Released on 27 October.
Samanala Kumariyo Samage Api Kawadath Surayo	Wimaladasa Perera	Tony Ranasinghe, Nita Fernando, Rukmani Devi, Vijaya Kumaranatunga, Roy de Silva, Sumana Amarasinghe, Wijeratne Warakagoda	Drama	Released on 20 November.
Hara Lakshaya	Titus Thotawatte	Robin Fernando, Piyadasa Gunasekera, Joe Abeywickrama, Senadheera Rupasinghe, Alexander Fernando, G. W. Surendra, Ignatius Gunaratne	Crime	Released on 17 December.
Mahene Reeri Yaka	Kithsiri Nihal Jayasinghe	Wally Nanayakkara, Malini Fonseka, Piyadasa Gunasekera, Wijeratne Warakagoda,	Thriller	Released on 22 December.

== 1972 ==
Title	Director	Cast	Genre	Notes
1972
Nidhanaya	Lester James Peiris	Gamini Fonseka, Malini Fonseka, Devika Karunaratne, Francis Perera, Saman Bokalawala, Mapa Gunaratne, Shanthi Lekha, Trilicia Gunawardena	Thriller	Released on 3 February.
Sahanaya	J. Selvarathnam	Gamini Fonseka, Malini Fonseka, Baptist Fernando, Mark Samaranayake, Rukmani Devi, Shanthi Lekha, Denawaka Hamine, H. R. Jothipala	Drama	Released on 1 March.
Wehi Lihini	Chandra S. Perera	Thimothi Ponmebrink, Sunila Jayanthi, P. P. Danawardana, Rani Gunawardana, Denawaka Hamine	Drama	Released on 15 March.
Sithijaya	Sarathchandra Herath	Kanthi Lanka, Wehalle Piyathilake, Eddie Junior, Miyuri Samarasinghe, Pearl Vasudevi	Drama	Released on 29 March. Debut Music direction of Sarath Dassanayake.
Edath Sooraya Adath Sooraya	Lenin Moraes	Gamini Fonseka, Malini Fonseka, Sonia Disa, Senadheera Rupasinghe, Lionel Deraniyagala, Alexander Fernando, Anthony C. Perera, Bandu Munasinghe	Action	Released on 7 April.
Sujeewa	Jo Dev Anand	Roy de Silva, Kanthi Lanka, H. R. Jothipala, Bandu Munasinghe, Freddie Silva, Don Sirisena	Drama	Released on 12 April.
Singapuru Charlie	Dommie Jayawardena	Sandhya Kumari, Anthony C. Perera, Dommie Jayawardena, Robin Fernando, Roy de Silva, Sumana Amarasinghe, Alexander Fernando	Comedy Action	Released on 19 May.
Ada Mehemai	Robin Tampoe	Oswald Jayasinghe, Ruvina Deepani, Devika Karunaratne, Alexander Fernando, Anthony C. Perera, Lilian Edirisinghe, B. S. Perera	Drama	Released on 22 May.
Atheethayen Kathawak	R. B. Adhikari	Henry Jayasena (voice), Nimal Dayaratne, Usha Samarasighe	Drama	Released on 15 June.
Hithaka Pipunu Mal	S. Ramanathan	Senadheera Rupasinghe, Srimathi Ranaweera, Robin Fernando, Beula Dias, Don Sirisena, Shanthi Lekha, Eddie Junior, Nawanandana Wijesinghe	Drama	Released on 16 June.
Hathara Wate	L. M. Perera	L. M. Perera, Dommie Jayawardena, Roy de Silva, Stanley Perera, Sumana Amarasinghe, D.R. Nanayakkara, Rukmani Devi, Piyadasa Gunasekera	Action	Released on 22 June.
Veeduru Gewal	Daya Wimalaweera	Senadheera Rupasinghe, Kumari Manel, Rukmani Devi, Piyadasa Gunasekera, Alexander Fernando, Basil De Saram, Joe Abeywickrama, Thalatha Gunasekara	Drama	Released on 14 July.
Lokuma Hinawa	K. A. W. Perera	Oswald Jayasinghe, Sumana Amarasinghe, D.R. Nanayakkara, L. M. Perera, Robin Fernando, Rex Kodippili, Herbert Amarawickrama, Lilian Edirisinghe	Drama	Released on 28 July.
Me Dasa Kumatada	Timothy Weeraratne	Vijaya Kumaranatunga, Malini Fonseka, Roy de Silva, Sumana Amarasinghe, Mark Samaranayake, Eddie Junior, Thalatha Gunasekara	Romance	Released on 2 September.
Sihina Lowak	Cyril Wickramage	Cyril Wickramage, Shirley Gomes, Wimal Kumara de Costa, Dharmadasa Kuruppu, Ivan Panditharatne, Daya Thennakoon	Drama	Released on 8 September.
Ihatha Athmaya	K. A. W. Perera	Ananda Jayaratne, Anula Karunathilaka, D. R. Nanayakkara, Robin Fernando, Rex Kodippili, Rukmani Devi, David Dharmakeerthi	Thriller	Released on 5 October.
Aadare Hithenawa Dekkama	Neil Rupasinghe	Gamini Fonseka, Vijaya Kumaranatunga, Malini Fonseka, Tony Ranasinghe, Alexander Fernando, Gunapala Weerasekara, Shyama Algama	Musical drama	Released on 3 November.
Miringuwa	Amarasena Kumarasinghe	Gamini Fonseka, Edna Sugathapala, Stanley Perera, Sonia Disa, Shane Gunaratne, L. M. Perera, Piyadasa Wijekoon	Action	Released on 17 November.
Wanaraja	William Blake	Basil de Seram, Vijaya Kumaratunga, Pearl Cooray, Piyadasa Gunasekera, Thalatha Gunasekara, Pujitha Mendis, Sunila Jayanthi, Nawanandana Wijesinghe	Drama	Released on 21 December.

== 1973 ==
Title	Director	Cast	Genre	Notes
1973
Mathara Aachchi	Sathischandra Edirisinghe	Sathischandra Edirisinghe, Swarna Mallawarachchi, Wally Nanayakkara, Nita Fernando, Dharmadasa Kuruppu, Denawaka Hamine, Chandra Kaluarachchi	Drama	Released on 11 January.
Aparadhaya Saha Danduwama	K. A. W. Perera	Oswald Jayasinghe, Sriyani Amarasena, Don Sirisena, Pearl Vasudevi, Senadheera Rupasinghe, Ruby de Mel, Robin Fernando, D. R. Nanayakkara	Action	Released on 26 January.
Suhada Pethuma	Kingsley Rajapaksa	Tissa Wijesurendra, Malini Fonseka, Rukmani Devi, Asoka Ponnamperuma, Rita Ratnayake, Lionel Deraniyagala, Sumana Amarasinghe	Romance	Released on 23 February.
Thushara	Yasapalitha Nanayakkara	Malini Fonseka, Sonia Disa, Vijaya Kumaranatunga, Joe Abeywickrama, Baptist Fernando, Mark Samaranayake, Shanthi Lekha	Romance	Released on 9 March.
Sadahatama Oba Mage	Milton Jayawardana	Gamini Fonseka, Joe Abeywickrama, Malini Fonseka, Milton Jayawardana, Somasiri Dehipitiya, Namel Weeramuni, H. D. Kulatunga, Sonia Disa	Romance	Released on 5 May.
Hathdinnath Tharu	Pathiraja L.S. Dayananda	Vijaya Kumaratunga, Devika Karunaratne, Malini Fonseka, Asoka Hewawitharana, Gamini Ganegoda, Tony Ranasinghe, Don Sirisena, Freddie Silva	Drama	Released on 22 June.
Gopalu Handa	K. Wenkat	Tony Ranasinghe, Jeevarani Kurukulasuriya, H. D. Kulatunga, D. R. Nanayakkara, B. S. Perera, Pitipana Silva, Herbert Amarawickrama	Drama	Released on 4 July.
Hondama Welawa	Lenin Moraes	Gamini Fonseka, Malini Fonseka, Vijaya Kumaratunga, Anthony C. Perera, Sonia Disa, Christy Leonard Perera, Swarna Mallawarachchi	Drama	Released on 3 August.
Sinawai Inawai	Kingsley Rajapaksa	Malini Fonseka, Tissa Wijesurendra, Sumana Amarasinghe, Asoka Ponnamperuma, L. M. Perera, Lionel Deraniyagala, D. R. Nanayakkara	Drama	Released on 15 September.
Sunethra	Jo Dev Ananda	Sumana Amarasinghe, Roy de Silva, Nita Fernando, Freddie Silva, Don Sirisena, H. R. Jothipala, Stanley Perera	Romance	Released on 12 October.
Hondai Narakai	Lenin Moraes	Gamini Fonseka, Malini Fonseka, Tony Ranasinghe, Eddie Jayamanne, Swarna Kahawita, Lionel Deraniyagala, Sonia Disa	Action	Released on 24 October.
Dahakin Ekak	Merril Albert	Vijaya Kumaratunga, Wimal Halangoda, Malini Fonseka, J. T. Wickremasinghe, Wimal Kumara de Costa, Somalatha Subasinghe, Piyasena Ahangama	Action	Released on 14 December.
Hondata Hondai	J. Selvaratnam	Gamini Fonseka, Malini Fonseka, Baptist Fernando, Anthony C. Perera, Don Sirisena, Alexander Fernando, Bandu Munasinghe	Action	Released on 21 December.

== 1974 ==
Title	Director	Cast	Genre	Notes
1974
Ahas Gauwa	Dharmasena Pathiraja	Vijaya Kumaratunga, Amarasiri Kalansuriya, Malini Fonseka, Wimal Kumara de Costa, Swarna Mallawarachchi, Wickrama Bogoda, Cyril Wickramage	Drama	Released on 24 January.
Duleeka	K. A. W. Perera	Vijaya Kumaratunga, Beula Dias, Oswald Jayasinghe, Sumana Amarasinghe, Eddie Jayamanne, Sampath Sri Nandalochana, Herbert Amarawickrama	Drama	Released on 25 February.
Dinum Kanuwa	Ranjith Perera	Tony Ranasinghe, D. R. Nanayakkara, Rukmani Devi, Don Sirisena, Freddie Silva, Somasiri Dehipitiya, H. R. Jothipala, B. S. Perera	Drama	Released on 5 March.
Kasturi Suwanda	Sena Samarasinghe	Gamini Fonseka, Malini Fonseka, Lionel Deraniyagala, Freddie Silva, Bandu Samarasinghe, Thalatha Gunasekara, Milton Jayawardena	Romance	Released on 8 March.
Damarikayo	Anderson Algama	Shane Gunaratne, Shyama Algama, Shiromala, Wimala Jayawardena	Action	Released on 3 April.
Sheela	Joe Suganda	Tony Ranasinghe, Jeevarani Kurukulasuriya, Rita Ratnayake, Freddie Silva, Don Sirisena, Roy de Silva, Oswald Jayasinghe	Drama	Released on 5 April.
Surekha	Robin Tampoe	Tissa Wijesurendra, Jenita Samaraweera, Hugo Fernando, Oswald Jayasinghe, Farina Lai, Freddie Silva, L. M. Perera, B. S. Perera	Romance	Released on 26 April.
Hadawath Neththo	Subayar Makin	Robin Fernando, Nita Fernando, Denawaka Hamine, Don Sirisena, Dommie Jayawardena, Shanthi Lekha, Lilian Edirisinghe	Action	Released on 26 April.
Sihasuna	Titus Thotawatte	Robin Fernando, Sriyani Amarasena, Somasiri Dehipitiya, Hugo Fernando, Piyadasa Gunasekera, Beula Dias, Rex Kodippili	Drama	Released on 31 May.
Kalyani Gangaa	Dharmasiri Caldera	Joe Abeywickrama, Sriyani Amarasena, Oswald Jayasinghe, H. D. Kulatunga, Don Sirisena, S. A. Jamis, Piyadasa Gunasekera, Thilakasiri Fernando	Drama	Released on 26 June.
Shanthi	W. Wilfred Silva	Oswald Jayasinghe, Nita Fernando, H. R. Jothipala, Sriyani Amarasena, Asoka Ponnamperuma, Rita Ratnayake, Pearl Vasudevi, Freddie Silva	Drama	Released on 5 July.
Onna Babo Billo Enawa	Lenin Morayas	Gamini Fonseka, Swarna Kahawita, Piyadasa Wijekoon, Joe Abeywickrama, Rita Ratnayake, Sonia Disa, Maurice Dahanayake, Rex Kodippili	Action	Released on 17 July.
Susee	Cyril B. Abeyratne	Malini Fonseka, Vijaya Kumaratunga, Eddie Jayamanne, Pearl Vasudevi, Eddie Junior, Don Sirisena, Nellie Fernando	Drama	Released on 19 August.
Sagarika	Titus Thotawatte	Tony Ranasinghe, Sriyani Amarasena, Robin Fernando, Rukmani Devi, D. R. Nanayakkara, Rex Kodippili, Ruby de Mel	Romance	Released on 6 September.
Duppathage Hithawatha	S. V. Chandran	Baptist Fernando, Nita Fernando, Rex Kodippili, H. D. Kulatunga, Shanthi Lekha, Farina Lai, Ronald Fernando, Don Sirisena	Action	Released on 2 October.
Lasanda	K. A. W. Perera	Oswald Jayasinghe, Nita Fernando, Dommie Jayawardena, Freddie Silva, Shanthi Lekha, Piyadasa Gunasekera, Tissa Wijesurendra	Drama	Released on 11 October.
Sahayata Danny	Yasapalitha Nanayakkara	Alexander Fernando, Sonia Disa, H. R. Jothipala, Lilian Edirisinghe, Hugo Fernando, D. R. Nanayakkara, Pearl Vasudevi	Action	Released on 25 October.
Senakeliya	Wimaladasa Perera, Herbert Ranjith Peiris	Gamini Fonseka, Vijaya Kumaratunga, Malini Fonseka, Fareena Lai, Alexander Fernando, Nawanandana Wijesinghe, Wimal Kumara de Costa	Action	Released on 15 November.
Vasthuwa	Siri Kularathne	Wally Nanayakkara, Nita Fernando, Tony Ranasinghe, Asoka Hewawitharana, Oswald Jayasinghe, Thalatha Gunasekara, Eddie Junior	Drama	Released on 30 November.
Mehema Harida	Abdeen Fausy	Senadheera Rupasinghe, Sonia Disa, Alexander Fernando, Anthony C. Perera, Pujitha Mendis, Joe Livera, Chandrapala Wijesooriya	Action	Released on 18 December.
Jeevana Gangaa	Dayananda Rodrigo	Senadheera Rupasinghe, Sonia Disa, Agra Sajivani, Robin Fernando, Devika Karunaratne, Rukmani Devi, Piyadasa Gunasekera	Drama	Released on 20 December.
Rodee Gama	B. S. Perera	Oswald Jayasinghe, B. S. Perera, Piyadasa Wijekoon, Alexander Fernando, Rex Kodippili, Lionel Deraniyagala, Lilian Edirisinghe	Drama	Released on 20 December.

== 1975 ==
Title	Director	Cast	Genre	Notes
1975
Hitha Honda Minihek	M. V. Balan	Gamini Fonseka, Tony Ranasinghe, Sonia Disa, Shanthi Lekha, Hugo Fernando, B. S. Perera, Pujitha Mendis, Lionel Deraniyagala	Action	Released on 14 January.
Aes Idiripita	Deepasiri Perera	Tissa Wijesurendra, Eddie Junior, Somasiri Dehipitiya	Drama	Released on 24 January.
Obai Mamai	Jo Dev Anand	Roy de Silva, Sumana Amarasinghe, Freddie Silva, H. R. Jothipala, V. T. G. Karunaratne, Piyadasa Gunasekera, Farina Lai	Romance	Released on 14 February.
Pem Kurullo	Louie Vanderstraeten	Vijaya Kumaratunga, Tissa Wijesurendra, Manel Wanaguru, Lionel Deraniyagala, Denawaka Hamine, Gamini Ganegoda, Pujitha Mendis	Drama	Released on 21 February.
Kaliyuga Kale	T. Arjuna	Tony Ranasinghe, Nita Fernando, Boniface Fernando, B. S. Perera, Lilian Edirisinghe, Leticia Peiris, D. R. Nanayakkara	Drama	Released on 7 March.
Raththaran Amma	Dharmasiri Caldera	Gamini Fonseka, Sriyani Amarasena, Joe Abeywickrama, Nita Fernando, Herbert Amarawickrama, Don Sirisena, B. S. Perera	Drama	Released on 21 March.
Tharanga	Wimal Waidyasekera	Ravindra Randeniya, Manel Wanaguru, Joe Abeywickrama, Bandu Munasinghe, Amarasiri Kalansuriya, Buddhi Wickrama, Don Sirisena	Romance	Released on 4 April.
Aawa Soya Aadare	Lenin Moraes	Gamini Fonseka, Malini Fonseka, Piyadasa Wijekoon, Anthony C. Perera, H. D. Kulatunga, Rita Ratnayake, Bandu Munasinghe	Romance	Released on 12 April.
Kohoma Kiyannada	Godwin Hanthi	Malini Fonseka, Tissa Wijesurendra, Nita Fernando, Rukmani Devi, Shanthi Lekha, Denawaka Hamine, Kusum Perera	Drama	Released on 21 May.
Cyril Malli	Joe Michael	Gamini Fonseka, Swarna Kahawita, Baptist Fernando, Joe Michael, Nita Fernando, H. D. Kulatunga, B. S. Perera, Eddie Junior	Action	Released on 23 May.
Mage Nangi Shyama	M. S. Ananda	Shyama Ananda, Roy de Silva, Freddie Silva, Rex Kodippili, H. R. Jothipala, Sumana Amarasinghe, Lilian Edirisinghe	Comedy	Released on 14 June.
Lassana Kella	Neil Rupasinghe	Geetha Kumarasinghe, Tissa Wijesurendra, Ananda Jayaratne, Nita Fernando, Pearl Vasudevi, Eddie Jayamanne, Alexander Fernando	Romance	Released on 20 June.
Amaraneeya Aadare	Dayananda Jayawardane	Piyaratne M. Senarath, Padma Siriwardena, Sonia Disa, Manel Wanaguru, Shanthi Lekha, B. S. Perera, Joe Michael, Dayananda Jayawardena	Romance	Released on 1 July.
Kokilayo	Tissa Hewawitharana	Tony Ranasinghe, Shirani Kurukulasuriya, Asoka Hewawitharana, Nita Fernando, Manel Wanaguru, Alexander Fernando, Thilakasiri Fernando	Drama	Released on 17 July.
Giju Lihiniyo	Roland Amarasinghe	Lionel Deraniyagala, Sonia Disa, Piyadasa Wijekoon, Dayananda Jayawardena, Anthony C. Perera, Shiromala	Thriller	Released on 26 July.
Suraya Surayamai	Lenin Moraes	Gamini Fonseka, Malini Fonseka, Joe Abeywickrama, Swarna Kahawita, Hugo Fernando, Rex Kodippili, Anthony C. Perera	Action	Released on 1 August.
Ranwan Reka	M. D. M. Daas	Roy de Silva, Sumana Amarasinghe, Pearl Cooray, Freddie Silva, Stanley Perera, H. R. Jothipala, Wimala Kumari	Drama	Released on 7 August.
Rajagedara Paraviyo	W. A. B. de Silva; Sathischandra Edirisinghe	Gamini Fonseka, Nita Fernando, Manel Wanaguru, Freddie Silva, Hugo Fernando, Lionel Deraniyagala, Bandu Munasinghe	Action Comedy	Released on 22 August.
Jeewana Geethaya	I. P. Sena	Rukmani Devi, Nita Fernando, Anthony C. Perera, Maurice Dahanayake, Beula Dias, Don Sirisena, B. S. Perera	Drama	Released on 29 August.
Damayanthi	K. Venkat	Rex Kodippili, Geetha Kumarasinghe, Oswald Jayasinghe, H. R. Jothipala, Asoka Ponnamperuma, Don Sirisena, D. R. Nanayakkara	Drama	Released on 11 September.
Sikuruliya	H. D. Premaratne	Joe Abeywickrama, Suvineetha Weerasinghe, Vijaya Kumaratunga, Bandula Galagedara, Thalatha Gunasekara, Ruby de Mel, Piyadasa Gunasekera	Drama	Released on 27 September.
Lassana Dawasak	Nimal Silva	Sriyani Amarasena, Vijaya Kumaranatunga, Rex Kodippili, Anthony C. Perera, Swarna Kahawita, Bandu Munasinghe, Ivan Panditharatne	Drama	Released on 3 October.
Sadhana	S. Ramanathan	Tissa Wijesurendra, Malani Fonseka, Joe Abeywickrama, Sumana Amarasinghe, Lionel Deraniyagala, Asoka Ponnamperuma, Piyadasa Wijekoon	Drama	Released on 17 October.
Hadawathaka Wasanthaya	Sumanadasa Weerakkody	Tissa Wijesurendra, Sumana Amarasinghe, Asoka Ponnamperuma, Lionel Deraniyagala, Helen Kumari, Bandu Munasinghe, Piyadasa Wijekoon	Drama	Released on 31 October.
Kalu Diya Dahara	Manik Sandra Sagara	Mano Brekanrij, Ravindra Randeniya, Joe Abeywickrama, Indira Jonklaas, Winston Serasinghe, G. R. Perera, Manel Wanaguru	Drama	Released on 28 November.
Sangeetha	Timothy Weeraratne	Malini Fonseka, Vijaya Kumaranatunga, Gamini Abeysinghe, Anusha Geethanjali, Shanthi Lekha, Eddie Junior, Don Sirisena	Romance	Released on 28 November.
Desa Nisa	Lester James Peiris	Sriyani Amarasena, Joe Abeywickrama, Ravindra Randeniya, Denawaka Hamine, Seetha Kumari, Preethi Randeniya	Drama	Released on 26 December.

== 1976 ==
Title	Director	Cast	Genre	Notes
1976
Pradeepe Ma Wewa	Yasapalitha Nanayakkara	Vijaya Kumaratunga, Malini Fonseka, Sonia Disa, Baptist Fernando, Theresa Weerasinghe, Wally Nanayakkara, Mark Samaranayake	Romance	Released on 2 January.
Nayana	H.E. Jayasinghe	Malini Fonseka, Gamini Fonseka, Lionel Deraniyagala, Pearl Cooray, Eddie Jayamanne, Rukmani Devi, Shanthi Lekha	Drama	Released on 9 January.
Thilaka Ha Thilakaa	Amaranath Jayathilake	Karunaratne Hangawatte, Vajira Nirmali, Somalatha Subasinghe, G. W. Surendra, S. A. Jamis, Sriyani Fonseka	Drama	Released on 20 February.
Kauda Raja	J. Selvaratnam	Gamini Fonseka, Malini Fonseka, Hugo Fernando, Anthony C. Perera, Baptist Fernando, Mark Samaranayake	Action	Released on 27 February.
Wasana	K. A. W. Perera	Vijaya Kumaratunga, Geetha Kumarasinghe, Joe Abeywickrama, Nita Fernando, Dommie Jayawardena, Geetha Kumarasinghe	Romance	Released on 26 March.
Madol Duwa	Lester James Peiris	Ajith Jinadasa, Padmasena Athukorala, David Dharmakeerthi, Somalatha Subasinghe, Joe Abeywickrama, Daya Alwis, Trilicia Gunawardena	Teen	Released on 2 April.
Walmath Wuwo	Vasantha Obeysekera	Cyril Wickramage, Tony Ranasinghe, Somasiri Dehipitiya, Namel Weeramuni, Shirley Gomez, Saman Bokalawala, Sriyani Perera	Drama	Released on 2 April.
Ganga	Pathiraja L.S. Dayananda	Vijaya Kumaratunga, Malini Fonseka, Ravindra Randeniya, Nawanandana Wijesinghe, Sriyani Perera, Shanthi Lekha	Drama	Released on 2 April.
Harima Badu Thunak	Ananda Hewage	Senadheera Rupasinghe, Swarna Kahawita, Anthony C. Perera, Sonia Disa, Bandu Munasinghe, Alexander Fernando	Action	Released on 30 April.
Kolamba Sanniya	Manik Sandrasagra	Geetha Kumarasinghe, Joe Abeywickrama, Eddie Jayamanne, Denawaka Hamine, Geetha Kumarasinghe, Freddie Silva, Daya Alwis	Comedy	Released on 7 May.
Diyamanthi	Vasantha Obeysekera	Malini Fonseka, Vijaya Kumaratunga, Somasiri Dehipitiya, Wimal Kumara de Costa, Rex Kodippili, Piyasena Ahangama	Drama	Released on 28 May.
Wanarayo	Sarathchandra Herath	Lionel Deraniyagala, Ananda Jayaratne, Bandu Munasinghe, Eddie Junior, Sampath Sri Nandalochana, Don Sirisena	Action	Released on 18 June.
Duhulu Malak	Vijaya Dharmasri	Nita Fernando, Tony Ranasinghe, Ravindra Randeniya, Samanthi Lanerolle, Inoka Weerasinghe, Preethi Randeniya, Agnes Sirisena	Romance	Released on 25 June.
Loka Horu	Tissa Abeysekara	Tony Ranasinghe, Suvineetha Weerasinghe, Robin Fernando, Alexander Fernando, Shirani Kurukulasuriya, Basil de Saram	Thriller	Released on 25 June.
Haratha Hathara	M. S. Kumar	Lionel Deraniyagala, Tissa Wijesurendra, Vijitha Mallika, Oswald Jayasinghe, Nita Fernando, Piyadasa Wijekoon	Action	Released on 2 July.
Aasha	S.G. Samarasinghe	Geetha Kumarasinghe, Tony Ranasinghe, Robin Fernando, D. R. Nanayakkara, Don Sirisena, Freddie Silva	Drama	Released on 16 July.
Unnatha Dahai Malath Dahai	Lenin Moraes	Vijaya Kumaratunga, Malini Fonseka, Tony Ranasinghe, Joe Abeywickrama, Swarna Kahawita, Maurice Dahanayake	Drama	Released on 23 July.
Hariyata Hari	William Ohlums	Ravindra Randeniya, Nita Fernando, Hugo Fernando, Mabel Blythe, Sonia Disa, Senadheera Rupasinghe, Mark Samaranayake	Drama	Released on 30 July.
Hulawali	W. A. B. de Silva	Gamini Fonseka, Tony Ranasinghe, Suvineetha Weerasinghe, Dharma Sri Munasinghe, Rex Kodippili, Eddie Junior, Pearl Vasudevi	Thriller	Released on 26 August.
Onna Mame Kella Panapi	Lenin Moraes	Malini Fonseka, Joe Abeywickrama, Tony Ranasinghe, Nita Fernando, Swarna Kahawita, Eddie Jayamanne, Christy Leonard Perera	Drama	Released on 3 September.
Saradiyelge Putha	Neil Rupasinghe	Malini Fonseka, Alexander Fernando, Tony Ranasinghe, Rukmani Devi, Ananda Jayaratne, Somasiri Dehipitiya, Anthony C. Perera	Action	Released on 10 September.
Deiyange Theenduwa	W.M.S. Tampoe	Dommie Jayawardena, Rita Ratnayake, Oswald Jayasinghe, Tony Ranasinghe, Nita Fernando, Mark Samaranayake	Action	Released on 24 September.
Mangala	Titus Thotawatte	Nita Fernando, Tony Ranasinghe, Hugo Fernando, Don Sirisena, Sumana Amarasinghe, Sriyani Amarasena	Drama	Released on 15 October.
Nilla Soya	Sena Samarasinghe	Gamini Fonseka, Manel Wanaguru, Fareena Lai, Rex Kodippili, Senaka Perera, Somasiri Dehipitiya, Rathnawali Kekunawela	Drama	Released on 12 November.
Aadarei Man Aadarei	Lenin Moraes	Vijaya Kumaratunga, Malini Fonseka, Tony Ranasinghe, Alexander Fernando, Eddie Jayamanne, Rex Kodippili	Romance	Released on 19 November.
Nedeyo	K. A. W. Perera	Tissa Wijesurendra, Vijaya Nandasiri, Sonia Disa, Upali Attanayake, Piyadasa Gunasekera, Anula Karunathilaka, V. T. G. Karunaratne	Drama	Released on 26 November.
Ran Thilaka	Wilfred Silva	Oswald Jayasinghe, Sriyani Amarasena, Sumana Amarasinghe, Roy de Silva, Asoka Ponnamperuma, Rex Kodippili, Shanthi Lekha	Drama	Released on 10 December.

== 1977 ==
Title	Director	Cast	Genre	Notes
1977
Neela	Joe Suganda	Malini Fonseka, Tissa Wijesurendra, Sumana Amarasinghe, Sandhya Kumari, Alexander Fernando, Shanthi Lekha	Romance	Released on 21 January.
Sakunthala	William Ohlums	Tony Ranasinghe, Vijaya Kumaratunga, Malini Fonseka, Sandhya Kumari, Senadheera Rupasinghe, Suvineetha Weerasinghe, Shanthi Lekha	Drama	Released on 28 January.
Sudu Pareviyo	Kingsley Rajapaksa	Tissa Wijesurendra, Sumana Amarasinghe, Roy de Silva, Asoka Ponnamperuma, Rukmani Devi, Gamini Abeysinghe, Jayasekara Aponsu	Drama	Released on 18 February.
Hithuwakkarayo	Joseph Francis Lane	Nita Fernando, Lionel Deraniyagala, Manel Wanaguru, D. R. Nanayakkara, Freddie Silva, Sudesh Gunaratne, Udula Dabare	Drama	Released on 25 February.
Sri Madara	Sathischandra Edirisinghe	Alexander Fernando, Sriyani Perera, Bandu Munasinghe, Dharmadasa Kuruppu, Rukmani Devi, Ranjith Dayananda	Drama	Released on 18 March.
Hariyanakota Ohoma Thamai	Gamini Hewawitharana	Vijaya Kumaratunga, Swarna Kahawita, Lionel Deraniyagala, Anthony C. Perera, Wimal Kumara de Costa, Lilian Edirisinghe	Drama	Released on 25 March.
Hithuwoth Hithuwamai	Lenin Moraes	Vijaya Kumaratunga, Malini Fonseka, Sriyani Amarasena, Dommie Jayawardena, Piyadasa Gunasekera, Eddie Jayamanne	Drama	Released on 6 April.
Niluka	K. Venkat	Tissa Wijesurendra, Geetha Kumarasinghe, Jenita Samaraweera, Freddie Silva, Piyadasa Gunasekera, Don Sirisena	Drama	Released on 12 April.
Pembara Madhu	Sugathapala Senarath Yapa	Vijaya Kumaratunga, Malini Fonseka, Tony Ranasinghe, Geetha Kumarasinghe, Ravindra Randeniya, Shanthi Lekha	Romance	Released on 22 April.
Deviyani Oba Kohida	Aruna Shanthi; Anton Gregory	Gamini Fonseka, Malini Fonseka, Somasiri Dehipitiya, Anthony C. Perera, Eddie Jayamanne, Laddie Ranasinghe	Drama	Released on 20 May.
Eya Den Loku Lamayek	Dharmasena Pathiraja	Vijaya Kumaratunga, Malini Fonseka, Shanthi Lekha, Wimal Kumara de Costa, Nishshanka Diddeniya, Ananda Fonseka, Hilda Agnes	Drama	Released on 27 May. Entered into the 9th Moscow International Film Festival
Chin Chin Nona	J. Selvaratnam	Gamini Fonseka, Farina Lai, Sonia Disa, Rukmani Devi, Shanthi Lekha, Rex Kodippili, Freddie Silva	Comedy Drama	Released on 24 June.
Honda Hitha	D. Mariadasan	Roy de Silva, Tissa Wijesurendra, Sumana Amarasinghe, Kusum Perera, V. T. G. Karunaratne, Rex Kodippili, Piyadasa Wijekoon	Drama	Released on 1 July.
Yali Ipade	M. P. Gemunu	Joe Abeywickrama, Senadheera Rupasinghe, Sriyani Amarasena, Mark Samaranayake, Pearl Cooray, Rex Kodippili, Eddie Jayamanne	Drama	Released on 8 July.
Sajaa	Cyril P. Abeyratne; Louie Vanderstraeten	Tissa Wijesurendra, Beula Dias, Lionel Deraniyagala, Agra Sajivani, Rita Ratnayake, Piyadasa Gunasekera, Dommie Jayawardena	Drama	Released on 30 July.
Sikuru Dasawa	Siri Kularathne	Wally Nanayakkara, Oswald Jayasinghe, Sriyani Amarasena, Denawaka Hamine, Jayasekara Aponsu, Asoka Hewawitharana	Drama	Released on 12 August.
Chandi Putha	Ariyarathna Perera	Gamini Fonseka, Geetha Kumarasinghe, Mervyn Jayathunga, Jenita Samaraweera, Eddie Junior, Somasiri Dehipitiya	Action	Released on 19 August.
Siripala Ha Ranmenika	Amaranath Jayathilake	Malini Fonseka, Ravindra Randeniya, Robin Fernando, Joe Abeywickrama, Piyadasa Wijekoon, Bandu Munasinghe, S. A. Jamis	Thriller	Released on 16 September.
Ege Aadara Kathawa	Yasapalitha Nanayakkara	Alexander Fernando, Sonia Disa, Chandralal Jayawarna, Eddie Junior, B. S. Perera, Anthony C. Perera, Mark Samaranayake	Drama	Released on 23 September.
Maruwa Samaga Waase	Titus Thotawatte	Vijaya Kumaratunga, Geetha Kumarasinghe, Wimal Kumara de Costa, Rex Kodippili, Jenita Samaraweera, Rathnawali Kekunawela	Action	Released on 30 September.
Tom Pachaya	Roy de Silva; Stanley Perera	Roy de Silva, Freddie Silva, Sumana Amarasinghe, Farina Lai, Don Sirisena, Rukmani Devi, Bandu Munasinghe	Comedy	Released on 11 November.
Niwena Ginna	Amaranath Jayathilake	Robin Fernando, Sriyani Amarasena, Joe Dambulagala, Agnes Sirisena, Swarna Kahawita, Sumana Amarasinghe, Tissa Wijesurendra	Drama	Released on 18 November.
Yakadaya	Neil Rupasinghe	Gamini Fonseka, Ravindra Randeniya, Jenita Samaraweera, Anula Karunathilaka, Anthony C. Perera, Rex Kodippili, Alexander Fernando	Thriller	Released on 9 December.
Wanagatha Kella	Henry Chandrawansa	B. S. Perera, Baptist Fernando, Sriyalatha Subasinghe, Piyadasa Gunasekera, Lilian Edirisinghe, Dharma Sri Ranasinghe	Drama	Released on 16 December.

== 1978 ==
Title	Director	Cast	Genre	Notes
1978
Sithaka Suwanda	S.V. Chandran	Tissa Wijesurendra, Sumana Amarasinghe, Tony Ranasinghe, Freddie Silva, Manel Wanaguru, Eddie Jayamanne, Pearl Vasudevi	Drama	Released on 14 January.
Chandi Shyama	M. S. Ananda	Shyama Ananda, Gamini Fonseka, Rex Kodippili, Senaka Perera, Lilian Edirisinghe, B. S. Perera, Don Sirisena	Comedy Action	Released on 20 January.
Janaka Saha Manju	K. A. W. Perera	Gothami Pathiraja, Jayantha Das Perera, Sonia Disa, Upali Attanayake, Herbert Amarawickrama, Thalatha Gunasekara, D. R. Nanayakkara	Romance	Released on 27 January.
Mage Ran Putha	M. V. Balan	Roy de Silva, Sumana Amarasinghe, Rex Kodippili, Baptist Fernando, Shanthi Lekha, B. S. Perera, Lilian Edirisinghe	Drama	Released on 17 February.
Wishmaya	J.K. Charles Perera	Vijaya Kumaratunga, Malini Fonseka, Piyadasa Gunasekera, Shanthi Lekha, D. R. Nanayakkara, Don Sirisena	Romance	Released on 1 March.
Gehenu Lamai	Sumithra Peiris	Vijaya Kumaratunga, Vasanthi Chathurani, Ajith Jinadasa, Shyama Ananda, Jenita Samaraweera, Trilicia Gunawardena, Chitra Wakishta	Drama	Released on 17 March 1978. Acting debut for Vasanthi Chathurani.
Madhuwanthi	Milton Jayawardana	Tony Ranasinghe, Freddie Silva, Geetha Kumarasinghe, Flora de Sousa, B. S. Perera, Don Sirisena, Lionel Deraniyagala	Drama	Released on 7 April.
Sri Pathula	K. Venkat	Joe Abeywickrama, Suvineetha Weerasinghe, Vijaya Nandasiri, Rex Kodippili, Freddie Silva, B. S. Perera, D. R. Nanayakkara	Thriller	Released on 14 April.
Aasha Desin	Sena Samarasinghe	Gamini Fonseka, Sriyani Amarasena, Rex Kodippili, Somasiri Dehipitiya, Wimal Kumara de Costa, Bandu Samarasinghe, Senaka Perera	Drama	Released on 28 April.
Hitha Mithura	Lenin Moraes	Gamini Fonseka, Sriyani Amarasena, Tony Ranasinghe, Alexander Fernando, Rex Kodippili, Shanthi Lekha, Anthony C. Perera	Drama	Released on 19 May.
Selinage Walauwa	Pathiraja L.S. Dayananda	Cyril Wickramage, Malini Fonseka, Joe Abeywickrama, Sriyani Amarasena, Vijaya Kumaratunga, Chandra Kaluarachchi, U. Ariyawimal	Thriller	Released on 9 June.
Sara	T. Arjuna	Tony Ranasinghe, Geetha Kumarasinghe, Joe Abeywickrama, Pearl Vasudevi, Eddie Jayamanne, D. R. Nanayakkara, Jayasekara Aponsu	Drama	Released on 22 June.
Kundalakesi	Wimalanath Disanayaka	Vijaya Kumaratunga, Malini Fonseka, Rukmani Devi, Eddie Junior, M. S. Fernando, B. S. Perera, Pujitha Mendis	Historical	Released on 21 July.
Tikira	Shirley P. Wijerathne	Baptist Fernando, Jenita Samaraweera, Manel Wanaguru, Boniface Fernando, Rex Kodippili, Shanthi Lekha, Aruna Shanthi	Action	Released on 4 August.
Veera Puran Appu	Lester James Peiris	Ravindra Randeniya, Joe Abeywickrama, Malini Fonseka, Tissa Abeysekera, Sriyani Amarasena, Dharmasiri Bandaranayake, Robin Fernando	Biographical	Released on 8 August.
Bambaru Avith	Dharmasena Pathiraja	Vijaya Kumaratunga, Malani Fonseka, Joe Abeywickrama, Cyril Wickramage, Wimal Kumara de Costa, Ruby de Mel, Amarasiri Kalansuriya	Drama	Released on 11 August.
Sally	Cyril P. Abeyratne	Malini Fonseka, Vijaya Kumaratunga, Joe Abeywickrama, Wimal Kumara de Costa, Baptist Fernando, Alexander Fernando	Drama	Released on 25 August.
Apsara	J. Selvaratnam	Gamini Fonseka, Veena Jayakody, Lionel Deraniyagala, Eddie Jayamanne, Freddie Silva, Rukmani Devi, B. S. Perera	Drama	Released on 1 September.
Deepanjali	Dharmasiri Caldera	Tissa Wijesurendra, Sumana Amarasinghe, Rex Kodippili, Geetha Kumarasinghe, Roy de Silva, Veena Jayakody, Hugo Fernando	Romance	Released on 6 October.
Apeksha	H. D. Premaratne	Amarasiri Kalansuriya, Malini Fonseka, Robin Fernando, Geetha Kumarasinghe, Ranjan Mendis, Kusum Perera, Felix Premawardhana	Drama	Released on 3 November.
Kumara Kumariyo	Sudas Maskorala	Vijaya Kumaratunga, Sriyani Amarasena, Joe Abeywickrama, Tissa Wijesurendra, Oswald Jayasinghe, Deshian Amarasinghe, D. R. Nanayakkara	Drama	Released on 10 November.
Sasara	K. A. W. Perera	Vijaya Nandasiri, Rukmani Devi, Sonia Disa, Jayantha Das Perera, Swarna Kahawita, Quintus Weerakoon, Upali Attanayake, Shanthi Lekha	Drama	Released on 17 November.
Sandawata Rantharu	Ananda Hewage; Siri Kularathne	Vijaya Kumaratunga, Malini Fonseka, Joe Abeywickrama, Sriyani Amarasena, Alexander Fernando, Sonia Disa, D. R. Nanayakkara	Romance	Released on 24 November.
Ahasin Polawata	Lester James Peiris	Tony Ranasinghe, Vijaya Kumaratunga, Sriyani Amarasena, Vasanthi Chathurani, Rukmani Devi, Thalatha Gunasekara, Shanthi Lekha	Romance	Released on 15 December. Represented at Cairo International film festival.
Anupama	Sunil Ariyaratne	Malini Fonseka, Vijaya Kumaratunga, Suvineetha Weerasinghe, Piyasena Ahangama, Sandhya Kumari, Amarasiri Kalansuriya	Romance	Released on 22 December.

== 1979 ==
Title	Director	Cast	Genre	Notes
1979
Samanmalee	Dayananda Gunawardena	Geetha Kumarasinghe, Roy de Silva, Sumana Amarasinghe, Rex Kodippili, Rukmani Devi, Eddie Jayamanne	Drama	Released on 19 January.
Geheniyak	Yasapalitha Nanayakkara	Vijaya Kumaratunga, Sonia Disa, Veena Jayakody, Rex Kodippili, Vincent Vaas, Vijaya Nandasiri, Annesley Dias	Drama	Released on 26 January.
Minisun Athara Minihek	Jo Dev Ananda	Gamini Fonseka, Veena Jayakody, Roy de Silva, Geetha Kumarasinghe, Freddie Silva, Rex Kodippili, Stanley Perera	Action	Released on 23 February.
Sarungale	Sunil Ariyaratne	Gamini Fonseka, Farina Lai, M. Abbas, Wimal Kumara de Costa, Veena Jayakody, Sriyani Amarasena, Rinsley Weeraratne	Drama	Released on 2 March.
Jeewana Kandulu	Daya Wimalaweera	Tissa Wijesurendra, Geetha Kumarasinghe, Joe Abeywickrama, Eddie Jayamanne, Asoka Ponnamperuma, Rukmani Devi, Herbert Amarawickrama	Romance	Released on 9 March.
Amal Biso	Neil Rupasinghe	Gamini Fonseka, Vasanthi Chathurani, Karunaratne Hangawatte, Somy Rathnayake, Shanthi Lekha, Mervyn Jayathunga, Elson Divithurugama	Drama	Released on 9 April.
Hingana Kolla	K. A. W. Perera	Vijaya Kumaratunga, Ravindra Randeniya, Sonia Disa, Joe Abeywickrama, Dommie Jayawardena, Malini Fonseka, Piyadasa Gunasekera	Drama	Released on 14 April.
Palangetiyo	Vasantha Obeysekera	Dharmasiri Bandaranayake, Dhammi Fonseka, Ranjan Mendis, Mercy Edirisinghe, Henry Jayasena, Denawaka Hamine, Pearl Vasudevi	Dramma	Released on 27 April.
Divi Thibena Thuru	N. P. Jayathissa	Malini Fonseka, Dommie Jayawardena, Denawaka Hamine, Piyadasa Gunasekera, David Dharmakeerthi, Nellie Fernando	Drama	Released on 4 May.
Raja Kollo	Gunasiri Senanayake	Joe Abeywickrama, Sriyani Amarasena, Lionel Deraniyagala, D. R. Nanayakkara, Baptist Fernando, Piyadasa Wijekoon	Action	Released on 18 May.
Muwan Palessa	Dharma Sri Kaldera	Rex Kodippili, Malini Fonseka, Gemunu Wijesuriya, Wally Nanayakkara, Hugo Fernando, Veena Jayakody, S. A. Jamis	Thriller	Released on 25 May.
Ran Kurullo	Kingsley Rajapaksha	Malini Fonseka, Tissa Wijesurendra, Ranjith Suranga, Jayasekara Aponsu, Rukmani Devi, Shanthi Lekha, Anusha Geethanjali	Drama	Released on 7 June.
Vasanthaye Dawasak	T. Arjuna	Ravindra Randeniya, Malini Fonseka, Joe Abeywickrama, Somalatha Subasinghe, S. A. Jamis, Sriyani Fonseka, Somy Rathnayake	Drama	Released on 28 June.
Monara Thenna	Yasapalitha Nanayakkara	Vijaya Kumaratunga, Malini Fonseka, Rex Kodippili, Rukmani Devi, Dommie Jayawardena, Anoja Weerasinghe, Seetha Kumari	Thriller	Released on 14 July.
Eka Hitha	K. M. D. Ariyapala	Tony Ranasinghe, Sriyani Amarasena, Vijaya Kumaratunga, Pearl Cooray, Kanthi Lanka, Denawaka Hamine, Alfred Edirimanne	Romance	Released on 20 July.
Rosa Mal Thunak	Dharmasiri Caldera	Tissa Wijesurendra, Sriyani Amarasena, Oswald Jayasinghe, Rex Kodippili, Piyadasa Wijekoon, V. T. G. Karunaratne, Quintus Weerakoon	Drama	Released on 27 July.
Chuda Manikyaya	Vijaya Dharma Sri	Ananda Wickramage, Ravindra Randeniya, Wimal Kumara de Costa, Vasanthi Chathurani, Veena Jayakody, Cyril Wickramage	Drama	Released on 24 August.
Anusha	Dayananda Rodrigo	Roy de Silva, Jenita Samaraweera, Dommie Jayawardena, Tissa Wijesurendra, Rukmani Devi, Sriyani Fonseka, Hilda Agnes	Drama	Released on 31 August.
Akke Mata Awasara	Wilfred Silva	Vijaya Kumaratunga, Sriyani Amarasena, Mervyn Jayathunga, Geetha Kumarasinghe, Mark Samaranayake, Sampath Sri Nandalochana	Drama	Released on 7 September.
Sugandhi	Dayananda Rodrigo	Ravindra Randeniya, Agra Sajivani, Bandu Munasinghe, Piyadasa Gunasekera, Tudor Karunathilake, B. S. Perera, Rex Kodippili	Drama	Released on 14 September.
Saudan Jema	Jayantha Samarasinghe	Lionel Deraniyagala, Geetha Kumarasinghe, Alexander Fernando, Piyadasa Gunasekera, Sonia Disa, Maurice Dahanayake, Denawaka Hamine	Drama	Released on 9 October.
Subhani	S. V. Chandran	Tony Ranasinghe, Sonia Disa, Alexander Fernando, Jenita Samaraweera, Baptist Fernando, B. S. Perera, Eddie Jayamanne	Drama	Released on 12 October.
Dutugemunu	Givantha Athasad	Cyril Wickramage, Henry Jayasena, Felix Premawardhana	Biographical	Released on 19 October. First Cartoon film in Sri Lanka.
Podi Malli	Sunil Ariyaratne	Ravindra Randeniya, Vijaya Kumaratunga, Geetha Kumarasinghe, Sathischandra Edirisinghe, Farina Lai, Thalatha Gunasekara	Action	Released on 2 November.
Handaya	Titus Thotawatte	U. Ariyavimal, Fantalian De Soysa, G.B. Ilangakoon, Henry Jayasena, P.G. Jayawardana, J.H. Jayawardena, Pearl Vasudevi	Children's	Released on 16 November.
Nuwan Renu	Milton Jayawardhane	Tony Ranasinghe, Malini Fonseka, Rukmani Devi, Eddie Junior, Sumana Amarasinghe, Farina Lai, Ananda Wickramage	Drama	Released on 23 November.
Visihathara Peya	Denzil P. Abewardhana	Joe Abeywickrama, Nita Fernando, Pathiraja L. S. Dayananda, Devika Karunaratne, Vincent Premasiri, Anthony C. Perera, Alexander Fernando	Thriller	Released on 30 November.
Hari Pudumai	S. Ramanadan	Ravindra Randeniya, Pearl Cooray, Joe Abeywickrama, Manel Wanaguru, Alexander Fernando, Rex Kodippili, David Dharmakeerthi	Drama	Released on 14 December.

== See also ==
- Cinema of Sri Lanka
- List of Sri Lankan films
