= 7th Sarasaviya Awards =

1970 awards festival for Sinhala cinema

- Date: March 7, 1970
- Site: Colombo New Theater Grounds, Sri Lanka
- Directed by: Granville Silva

Highlights
- Best Picture: Binaramalee
- Most awards: Golu Hadawatha (8)
- Most nominations: Binaramalee

Television coverage
- Network: Associated Newspapers of Ceylon Limited

The 7th Sarasaviya Awards festival (Sinhala: 7වැනි සරසවිය සම්මාන උලෙළ), presented by the Associated Newspapers of Ceylon Limited, was held to honor the best films of 1969 Sinhala cinema on March 7, 1970, at the Colombo New Theater Grounds, Sri Lanka. Minister of Education I. M. R. A. Iriyagolle was the chief guest at the awards night.

The film Binaramalee won the most awards with eight including Best Film.

== Awards ==
Category	Film	Recipient
Best Film	Binaramalee	Mudalinayaka Somaratne
Best Director	Binaramalee	Mudalinayaka Somaratne
Best Actor	Senehasa	Herbert M. Seneviratne
Best Actress	Binaramalee	Swarna Kahawita
Best Supporting Actor	Binaramalee	Piyadasa Gunasekara
Best Supporting Actress	Binaramalee	Shanthi Lekha
Best Script Writer	Binaramalee	Tissa Abeysekara
Best Cinematographer	Narilatha	W. A. B. de Silva
Best Editor	Narilatha	T. A. Kamoor
Best Sound Effects	Narilatha	Mervyn Rodrigo
Best Music Direction	Narilatha	Premasiri Khemadasa
Best Lyricist	Binaramalee	Mahagama Sekara
Best Male Playback Singer	Binaramalee	W. D. Amaradeva
Best Female Playback Singer	Narilatha	Latha Walpola
Most Popular Actor	People's vote	Gamini Fonseka
Most Popular Actress	People's vote	Anula Karunathilaka
Merit Awards	Senehasa	Jeevarani Kurukulasuriya

Category	Film
Popular Awards from Reader Vote
Popular Awards from Reader Vote	Binaramalee
Popular Awards from Reader Vote	Narilatha
Popular Awards from Reader Vote	Senehasa
