= Hathara Denama Soorayo (1971 film) =

- හතරදෙනාම සූරයෝ
- Directed by: Neil Rupasinghe
- Written by: Neil Rupasinghe; Lenin Moraes
- Based on: Story by Dharmasiri Gamage
- Produced by: Neil Rupasinghe
- Starring: Gamini Fonseka; Vijaya Kumaratunga; Anthony C. Perera; Senadeera Rupasinghe
- Cinematography: Lenin Moraes
- Edited by: W.D.K. Ruben
- Music by: P. L. A. Somapala
- Production company: Samudra Films
- Release date: 20 July 1971
- Country: Sri Lanka
- Language: Sinhala

Hathara Denama Soorayo (Sinhala: හතරදෙනාම සූරයෝ) is a 1971 Sri Lankan Sinhala action romantic film directed, produced and co-written by Neil Rupasinghe for Samudra Films. The four protagonist roles are played by Gamini Fonseka, Vijaya Kumaratunga, Anthony C. Perera and Senadeera Rupasinghe in lead roles along with Malini Fonseka and Sriyani Amarasena. Music composed by P. L. A. Somapala. It is the 230th Sri Lankan film in the Sinhala cinema. It is the first film in Sinhala cinema to be screened for 100 consecutive days in a single cinema hall. The film also witnessed as the first film in which Gamini Fonseka, Malini Fonseka and Vijaya Kumaratunga act together.

== Cast ==
- Vijaya Kumaratunga as Vijay
- Gamini Fonseka as Podde ayya
- Anthony C. Perera as Jagiris(Jagiriya) a.k.a. Jaggi
- Senadeera Rupasinghe as Linton
- Rex Kodippilli - Stuntman(Stunt-double to Senadeera Rupasinghe(as Linton) during the scene where Linton rides a Motorbike)
- Malini Fonseka as Nilmini
- Sriyani Amarasena as Soma
- Lionel Deraniyagala as Harry
- Pearl Vasudevi as Soma's mother, Bath amma
- Barbara Fernando as Jaggi's fiancée
- Agra Sajeewani De Alwis as Sumana
- Vaijayanthimala Rodrigo
- Thalatha Gunasekara as Nilmini's step mother
- Bandu Munasinghe
- M. S. Fernando as Robert
- Alexander Fernando as Garage fighter
- Sugath Prasanna

== Soundtrack ==
No.	Title	Singer(s)	Length
1.	"Me Desa Mage"	H. R. Jothipala
2.	"Kodi Gaha Yata"	H. R. Jothipala, M. S. Fernando
3.	"Aha Aha Adaraneeya Sinawe"	H. R Jothipala, Angeline Gunathilake
4.	"Pathum Mallaki Me Jeevithe"	Latha Walpola
5.	"Raththaranin Ran Kirilliye"	M. S. Fernando, Anjaline Gunathilake

== Production ==
According to the director, the characters were identified very soon as most of them are director's friends. Senadheera, Anthony had worked with him before. Gamini was a friend of Neil. But, Gamini had the least number of scenes in the film. At that time Gamini was paid Rs. 40,000 for the film. Senadheera and Anthony had the most scenes. Before the film, Sriyani had acted in only two films. along with the crew and Vijaya-Malini combination first starred in the film as well.

On September 11, 1970, the filming began at the Hendala Vijaya studio, led by the owner of Cinemas K. Gunaratnam and Neil's father, David Rupasinghe, the owner of the Wattala Samudra Cinema. Filming finished after 58 days. Although the days were short, they planned to make the film months later. Meanwhile, all the songs composed for the film by PLA Somapala were imitated tunes. All but one of the songs are based on popular Hindi songs. The song "Kodi Gaha Yata" sung by H. R. Jothipala and M. S. Fernando was the only English imitated song. It was the first time that an English song was imitated in a Sinhala film.

== Release ==
The curfew was imposed on April 5, 1971, in the country due to the 1971 JVP insurrection, where cinemas across the country were closed. After that, the cinemas reopened in June 1971. The film was released after insurrection as the second film behind K. A. W. Perera's film Kathuru Muwath. By the time the film was released, the curfew in the Western Province had not been completely lifted. Night curfews were already in place in some areas where the 9.30 screening did not take place. It was screened for more than 100 days at a number of leading cinemas including Gamini Theatre, Maradana.

== Remake ==
In 2008, the remake of the film was made with the same title Hathara Denama Soorayo remake which was directed and produced by the same person. With that, the film became the second in the history of film industry in the world that the same Producer and Director did a re-make of the same film after 37 years with the same theme creating a world record.
