= Don Sirisena =

Sri Lankan actor and comedian (1934–1986)

Don Sirisena දොන් සිරිසේන
- Born: Arandara Kankanamlage Don Sirisena; 1934; Borella, British Ceylon
- Died: 1986 (aged 51); Colombo, Sri Lanka
- Other name: A.K.D. Sirisena
- Education: Sri Punyakami Maha Vidyalaya
- Occupations: Actor, comedian
- Years active: 1964–1986
- Relatives: Damitha Saluwadana (cousin sister)

Arandara Kankanamlage Don Sirisena (born 1934 – died 1986 as දොන් සිරිසේන [Sinhala]), popuarly as Don Sirisena, was an actor in Sri Lankan cinema and theater. One of the most popular comedy artists ever in Sri Lankan film history, Sirisena had a career spanned about two decades acted more than 150 films.

== Personal life ==
Don Sirisena was born on 1934 in Borella, British Ceylon as the youngest in a family of five. His father was a police officer and mother was a housewife. He had two elder brothers and two elder sisters.

Sirisena was married to Enid Saluwadana, where the couple has one daughter, Sujeewā (born in 1971) and one son, Sanjaya (born in 1973). Sirisena had no intention to introduce his children to acting, which resulted them to be business persons.

His wife Enid was the elder sister of popular actress Damitha Saluwadana. After a career more than four decades in cinema, theatre and television, Damitha died on 27 November 2015 at the age of 67. Sirisena's one of the nephews, Dunstan Nandalal is also an actor.

Sirisena died in 1986 at the age of 51 after suffering from prolong illness.

== Career ==
Sirisena started acting in stage plays since childhood. After seeing his theatre performances, Ariyadasa Pieris came to meet him to invite his new film Sobana Sitha. With that, Sirisena started his cinema career in 1964 with the film Sobana Sitha. Since then, he continued act in more than 150 films particularly as the supporting comedian with other popular comedy actors of his era such as Freddie Silva, B. S. Perera and Wimal Kumara de Costa. His final cinema appearance came through 1991 film Ali Baba Saha Horu Hathaliha, five years after his death.

He fell ill from time to time since film debut. In 1970s, he was seriously ill and spent almost a year in bed. During this time, he had slow down the cinema career. However, after some rest, he started to perform as a supportive comedian in number of films in golden 70s. Apart from comedy roles, he also performed in few dramatic roles in the films such as: Hadawath Naththo, Rail Paara and Kiwulegedara Mohottala. In the film Rail Paara, he played the role as a blind person, and in the film Kiwulegedara Mohottala, he played as a Vedda leader.

Apart from acting, Sirisena worked as a dolak and tabla player of the Music Association on Southern Road, Mount Lavinia, where singer Walter Fernando is one of his colleague. Although he was a regular member of the Association, he was soon forced to step away from music due to his involvement in films. He also sporadically appeared in theatre and performed in popular stage plays such as: Sivammā Dhanapāla and Kaḍavunu Poronduva.

== Filmography ==
Year	Film	Role	Ref.
1964	Sobana Sitha		
1965	La Dalu		
1965	Saaravita	Muslim Mudalali's co-worker	
1966	Kapatikama	Bookstore owner	
1966	Sanda Naga Eddi		
1966	Senasili Suwaya	Basunah	
1967	Sengawunu Menika		
1967	Ipadune Ai?		
1967	Sura Chauraya		
1968	Bicycle Hora		
1968	Hangi Hora		
1968	Ruhunu Kumari		
1968	Ataweni Pudumaya		
1969	Kohomada Wade		
1969	Harimaga	Simon	
1969	Kawuda Hari?	Jussa	
1969	Baduth Ekka Horu	Sena	
1969	Mee Masso		
1969	Pickpocket	Pachoris	
1969	Uthum Sthriya		
1970	Sumudu Bharya		
1970	Athma Pooja		
1970	Geetha	Photographer	
1970	Thevatha		
1970	Penawa Neda		
1970	Ohoma Hondada		
1971	Poojithayo	Bando	
1971	Davena Pipasa		
1971	Ran Onchilla		
1971	Kathuru Muwath	Kathuru Muwath's friend	
1971	Seeye Nottuwa		
1971	Samanala Kumariyo		
1972	Sujeewa	Matchmaker	
1972	Singapore Charlie		
1972	Ada Mehemai	Bartender	
1972	Hithaka Pipunu Mal		
1972	Lokuma Hinawa	Sleeping patient	
1972	Me Desa Kumatada		
1972	Ihatha Athmaya	Dumped into street runner / Hawker	
1973	Matara Achchi	Cyril's city co-worker's father	
1973	Suhada Pethuma	Chamila's worker	
1973	Thushara		
1973	Aparadhaya Ha Danduwama		
1973	Gopalu Handa		
1973	Hathdinnath Tharu	Samson	
1973	Sunethra	Manager	
1973	Hondata Hondai	Duncan's foreman	
1974	Duleeka		
1974	Dinum Kanuwa		
1974	Sheela	Poster affixer	
1974	Hadawath Naththo		
1974	Sihasuna		
1974	Kalyani Ganga	Punch Appu 'Manager'	
1974	Shanthi		
1974	Onna Babo Billo Enawa	Gulsan	
1974	Susee	Leo Mahathaya	
1974	Sagarika		
1974	Duppathage Hithawatha	Ananda's friend	
1974	Sahayata Danny	Patient with toothache	
1974	Rodi Gama	Roba	
1975	Obai Mamai		
1975	Raththaran Amma	Hadda	
1975	Tharanga	Wijesena Silva	
1975	Sukiri Kella	Engineer David Gunathilake	
1975	Kokilayo		
1975	Rajagedara Paraviyo		
1975	Jeewana Geethaya		
1975	Damayanthi		
1975	Sadhana		
1975	Hadawathaka Wasanthaya		
1975	Sangeetha	Charlie	
1976	Kawuda Raja	Bando	
1976	Kolamba Sanniya	Saping	
1976	Vanarayo		
1976	Loka Horu		
1976	Haratha Hathara		
1976	Asha		
1976	Hariyata Hari	Mudalali's caretaker	
1976	Mangala		
1976	Ran Thilaka		
1977	Sakunthala		
1977	Nilukaa		
1977	Chin Chin Nona		
1977	Sajaa		
1977	Maruwa Samaga Wase	Mudalali store frequenter	
1977	Chandi Shyama		
1977	Tom Pachaya	Mudaliyar	
1978	Vishmaya	Siyadu	
1978	Madhuwanthi	Johnson	
1978	Sri Pathula		
1978	Hitha Mithura		
1978	Saara		
1978	Janaka Saha Manju		
1978	Tikira	Dharme	
1978	Deepanjali		
1978	Apeksha		
1979	Raan Kurullo		
1979	Samanmalee		
1979	Minisun Athara Minisek		
1979	Hingana Kolla	Gardener	
1979	Raja Kollo	Pala's employee	
1979	Rosa Mal Thunak	Anusha's servant	
1979	Anusha	Fake daddy	
1979	Sawudan Jema		
1979	Subhani		
1979	Hari Pudumai		
1980	Silva		
1980	Anuhasa		
1980	Doctor Susantha		
1980	Raja Dawasak		
1980	Mage Amma		
1981	Mihidum Sihina		
1981	Kolamkarayo	Member Mahaththaya's assistant	
1981	Vajira	Elaris	
1981	Senasuma		
1981	Sathkulu Pawwa	Alphonso	
1981	Dayabara Nilu	David	
1981	Jeewanthi		
1982	Sandaa		
1982	Yasa Isuru	Salaman	
1982	Sudu Ayya	Cyril	
1982	Eka Diga Kathawak		
1982	Wathura Karaththaya	Inspector Sarayan	
1982	Sithaara		
1982	Rail Paara		
1982	Thakkita Tharikita		
1982	Major Sir		
1982	Kadawunu Poronduwa	Tamil Priest	
1983	Ranmini Muthu	Mudalali	
1983	Sandamali	Nandoris	
1983	Chuttey	Mudalali	
1983	Sumithuro		
1983	Karate Joe		
1983	Thuththiri Mal		
1983	Hithath Hondai Wadath Hondai		
1938	Loku Thaththa		
1983	Rathu Makara	Karolis	
1984	Kekille Rajjuruwo	Rabbada Aiyya	
1984	Veera Madduma Bandara	Pinhamy	
1984	Ara Soyza	Don	
1984	Mala Giravi	Sudu Banda	
1984	Hitha Honda Kollek		
1984	Kokila	Kuddiya	
1984	Muthu Manike		
1985	Puthuni Mata Samawenna		
1985	Aeya Waradidda Oba Kiyanna		
1985	Obata Diwura Kiyannam	Hotel manager	
1986	Prarthana		
1987	Kiwulegedara Mohottala	Dinga	
1988	Ko Hathuro		
1989	Badulu Kochchiya		
1990	Sambudu Mahima		
1990	Walawwe Hamu		
1991	Alibaba Saha Horu Hathaliha		
