= Piyadasa Gunasekera =

Sri Lankan actor (1915–1980)

Piyadasa Gunasekera පියදාස ගුණසේකර
- Born: Hilla Liyanage Don Piyadasa Gunsekera; 1915; Colombo, British Ceylon
- Died: 5 April 1980 (aged 65); Colombo, Sri Lanka
- Education: Ananda College
- Occupation: Film actor
- Years active: 1950–1980
- Children: Lankarajini Gunsekera
- Relatives: Jinadasa Gunasekera (brother); Irene de Alwis (niece)

Hilla Liyanage Don Piyadasa Gunsekera (born 1915 – died 5 April 1980 as Sinhala: පියදාස ගුණසේකර), popularly known as Piyadasa Gunasekera, was an actor in Sri Lankan cinema.

== Personal life ==
Piyadasa Gunasekara was born in 1915 in Maligakanda, Colombo, Sri Lanka. He was educated at Industrial College, Campbell Place and Ananda College, Colombo. After school life, he worked as a travel agent of Tram car driver for Trans International and enlisted in the Army during World War II.

His daughter Lankarajini is a singer who started her career in Sunen Gokula's 'Sangeetha Sandyawa' program in radio. She was educated at St. Paul's College, Milagiriya.

He died on 05 April 1980 at the age of 65. His death from alcohol poisoning was a controversial event.

== Career ==
He started his acting career as a theater actor where he performed in the stage plays Rodi Kella and Samudra Devi produced by Sirisena Wimalaweera. Then in 1952, he made his first cinematic appearance with the drama religious film Siri Sangabo. The film is unique in Sinhala cinema history, as its story and dialogue were written by a Buddhist monk, Ven. Wathuregama Somalankara Thero. However, his most critically acclaimed performance came through the 1955 film Seda Sulang directed by T. Somasekaran. Also his role as 'Podi Ralahamy' in the film Handapana. Some of his other popular films include: Daru Duka, Sāraviṭa, Maha Rǣ Hamu Vū Sthriya, Lasanda, Romeō Julieṭ Kathāvak, Veeduru Geval, Baḍuth Ekka Horu, Binaramalī, and Sikuruliyā.

Apart from Sinhala films, he also starred in two English films Kommissar X – Drei gelbe Katzen (The Three Yellow Cats) and The Green Emeralds. As a technician, he worked for Arthur Rank and M.G.M. film productions such as Purple Plain, Elephant Walk, Star of Colombo, and Laughing Anne. After many villain roles, he made a white role in the film Senasuma Kothanada. In the film Haara Lakshaya, he played the role of James Seneviratne, the main antagonist. The film was based on the first horrific robbery and murder in Sri Lanka, known as the turf club robbery that occurred on 27 January 1949. After the success in the film, he received several villain roles again in the films: Hathara Wate, Vanaraja, Aparadaya Saha Danduwama, Kalyani Ganga, Jeevana Ganga and Tom Pachaya. In 1981, he played the role of 'Devadatta' in the film Ajasaththa, which became one of his other milestone.

In 1965 at the 2nd United Lanka Fans Society Award Ceremony, he won the award for Best Co Actor for his role in the film Suba Sarana Sapa Sithe. In 1968, he won the Special Awards at 5th Sarasaviya Awards for the film Daru Duka. Then in 1970 at 7th Sarasaviya Awards, Gunasekera won the Best Supporting Actor award for his role in Binaramalee. Later in 1974, he won the Deepashika Special Award at 4th Deepashika Award Ceremony for his contribution to the Sinhala cinema.

In 2013, For the first time in the country, the Stamp Bureau has released four stamps of four villain actors including Piyadasa Gunasekera.

== Filmography ==
Year	Film	Roles	Ref.
1952	Siri Sangabo		
1953	Laughing Anne	Technical crew	
1954	The Purple Plain	Technical crew	
1954	Elephant Walk	Technical crew	
1954	Star of Colombo	Technical crew	
1955	Seda Sulang	Playback Singer, Anton	
1957	Surasena	Romiel	
1958	Deyyange Rate		
1958	Vana Mohini		
1958	Sihinaya		
1963	Sunilaa		
1963	Deepashika	Mr. Gunasekara	
1964	Suba Sarana Sepa Sithe		
1965	Handapana		
1965	Saaravita	Jackie	
1966	Segawena Sewanella		
1966	Senasuma Kothanada		
1966	Maha Ra Hamuwu Sthriya		
1966	Athulweema Thahanam		
1966	Sampatha		
1966	Kommissar X – Drei gelbe Katzen		
1967	Rena Giraw	Kolamba Hamu	
1967	Hathara Kendare		
1967	Sorungeth Soru		
1967	Daru Duka	Podi Ralahamy	
1967	Sadol Kandulu		
1967	Hitha Giya Thena		
1968	Pini Bindu		
1968	Hangi Hora		
1968	Dehadaka Dura	Heen Hamu's henchman	
1969	Hari Maga	Norbert henchman	
1969	Baduth Ekka Horu	Nambiyar	
1969	Binaramalee	Gunman	
1969	Romeo Juliet Kathawak	Gajanayake	
1969	Paara Walalu		
1970	Nim Walalla		
1971	Davena Pipasa		
1971	Haara Lakshaya	J. L. D. 'Seney' Senaratne	
1971	Maha Hene Riri Yaka	John Rathsingha	
1972	Hathara Wate		
1972	Vanaraja		
1972	Veeduru Gewal	Uncle	
1973	Aparadaya Saha Danduwama		
1974	Kalyani Ganga	Mudalali	
1974	Jeewana Ganga		
1974	Sihasuna		
1974	Lasanda	Silva	
1975	Obai Mamai	Piyadasa	
1975	Sikuruliya	Haramanis	
1976	Nedeyo	Adwagath Hamu	
1977	Hithuvoth Hithuwamai	Piyadasa 'Piya'	
1977	Niluka		
1977	Vanagatha Kella		
1977	Hariyanakota Ohoma Thamai		
1977	Sajaa		
1977	Siripala Saha Ranmenika	Nagaran	
1977	Janaka Saha Manju	Police Inspector	
1978	Sasara		
1978	Vishmaya	Ralahamy	
1979	Hingana Kolla	Peduru	
1979	Divi Thibena Thura	Jokeenu	
1979	Sugandi	Doctor	
1979	Sawudan Jema	Kahathudawe Ralahamy	
1979	Raja Kollo	Jamis	
1980	Seetha		
1980	Sasaraka Pathum	Shanthi's father	
1980	Muwan Palessa 2	Gunman	
1980	Raja Dawasak	Adikaram	
1981	Ajasaththa	Devadaththa	
1982	Sandaa	Babarala	
1982	Re Manamali		
1982	Miss Mallika		
1982	Sudu Ayya	Mr. Ranatunga	
1985	Mawbima Nathinam Maranaya		
