= Saaravita =

Saaravita සාරවිට
- Directed by: Tissa Liyanasuriya
- Written by: K. A. W. Perera
- Produced by: Serendib Films
- Starring: Joe Abeywickrama; Wally Nanayakkara; Thilakasiri Fernando; Jeevarani Kurukulasuriya
- Cinematography: W. A. Ratnayake
- Edited by: Titus Thotawatte
- Music by: W. D. Amaradeva
- Release date: 25 June 1965
- Country: Sri Lanka
- Language: Sinhala

Saaravita (Sinhala: සාරවිට) is a 1965 Sri Lankan Sinhala comedy thriller film directed by Tissa Liyanasuriya and produced by Shesha Palihakkara for Serendib Films. It stars Joe Abeywickrama in lead role along with Wally Nanayakkara, Thilakasiri Fernando and Jeevarani Kurukulasuriya. Music composed by W. D. Amaradeva. It is the 126th Sri Lankan film in the Sinhala cinema.

Saravita won the award for the Best film at the 1966 Sarasaviya Awards. Also, Tissa Liyanasuriya won Sarasaviya awards for Best Director, Joe Abeywickrema won Best Actor award and Nanda Malini won Best Songstress that year.

== Cast ==
- Joe Abeywickrama as Bamunusinghe Arachilage Gunahamy 'Saraiyya'
- Jessica Wickramasinghe as Maggie Akka
- Wally Nanayakkara as Jayathunga Arachige Marcus 'Marcus Aiyya'
- Thilakasiri Fernando as Pahul 'Unnahe'
- Piyadasa Gunasekera as Jackie
- Jeevarani Kurukulasuriya as Imara Ganegoda
- Sunila Jayanthi as Neranjana
- Sobani Amarasinghe as Devika
- Bandu Munasinghe as Somey
- Somi Meegama as Imara's Amma
- D. M. Colombage as Social service worker
- B. S. Perera as Muslim Mudalali
- Don Sirisena as Muslim Mudalali's co-worker
- M. A. Simiyon as Robbed Mudalali
- Martin Gunadasa
- S. P. Liyanage as Pappa Mahaththaya
