= Dharmasiri Gamage =

Sri Lankan journalist, film director, script writer, lyricist

- Born: 4 October 1939; Katamburawa, Ceylon
- Died: 19 September 2004 (aged 64); Dambulla, Sri Lanka
- Citizenship: Sri Lankan
- Occupations: Journalist, Film Director, Script Writer, lyricist
- Employer(s): Associated Newspapers of Ceylon Limited (Lake House, Colombo)
- Notable work: Directing Puja Sinhala Film – 1986
- Spouse: Mangalika Nagodawithana
- Children: Anjana, Chaminda, Suminda

Dharmasiri Gamage (Sinhala: ධර්මසිරි ගමගේ) (4 October 1939 – 19 September 2004) was a journalist, poet, writer and film director.

== Biography ==
Dharmasiri Gamage was born on 4 October 1939, the only son to Maththaka Gamage Peter Appuhamy and Kalegana Arachchige Chandrawathi and the eldest brother to three sisters.

=== Journalism ===
Gamage's journalism career was helped by U.A.A. Perera (Siri Aiya). Growing up, Gamage was interested in arts and literature and wanted to learn and practice journalism. For him, Maligakanda Maha Bodhi Mandiraya was an oasis and influence of Siri Aiya was a lamp-post that guided his future life.

Gamage became a journalist joining Lankadeepa as a sub-editor in 1959 on the invitation of K. M. Sirisena, who was the deputy editor of the Sinhala daily The Lankadeepa (then owned by the Times, Sri Lanka).

He joined Lake House in 1977 and worked for Dinamina, Janatha and Silumina. Gamage's Pahan Weta, which was compiled weekly on Yovun Janatha, was a publication of Lake House. It became famous as an early youth forum.

=== Music career ===
Gamage wrote his first lyrics "Ho Mage Prema Matha" in 1955 for Kala Suri G.S.B. Rani Perera, who was a veteran singer in Sri Lanka and a program producer of the Radio Ceylon (Sri Lanka Broadcasting Corporation) when he was just 16 years old. Gamage has written more than 200 lyrics for Sinhala songs with music composed by music directors like Pandith W.D. Amaradeva, Premasiri Khemadasa and Rohana Weerasinghe and performed by various artists like Kala Suri G.S.B. Rani Perera, Pandith W.D. Amaradeva and Isharada Nanda Malini, and Haroon Lanthra.

=== Cinema ===
Gamage was a film director for the Sinhala film Puja in 1986 Award winners Joe Abeywickrama and Amarasiri Kalansuriya contributed to it in action. Gamage wrote scripts to Dharmasena Pathiraja's Eya Dan Loku Lamayek (1977), Amaranath Jayathilake's Siripala Saha Ranmenika (1977) and Sunil Ariyaratne's Sarungale (1980). He wrote "Sansara Gamane Thanha Asha" music composed by Premasiri Khemadasa and sung by Pandith W.D. Amaradva for the film Sanasuma Kothanada in 1963.

=== Later years ===
After his retirement from Lake House, he became a traveller and published his experiences. Gamage was well known as an environment-lover and was honoured for his writings in 1999 as the Best Travel Writer and in 2002 received an award by the Sri Lanka Environmental Journalist Forum for the Best Travel Writer.
