= Denawaka Hamine =

Sri Lankan actress (1906-2002)

Denawaka Hamine දෙනවක හාමිනේ
- Born: Donna Mariah Denawaka; 20 February 1906; Imbulgoda, Gampaha, British Ceylon
- Died: 9 December 2002 (aged 96); Colombo, Sri Lanka
- Education: Imbulgoda Vidyalaya
- Occupations: Actress, Dramatist
- Years active: 1962–2002
- Children: 1
- Awards: Best Actress

Kala Suri Donna Mariah Denawaka (20 February 1906 – 9 December 2002 as දෙනවක හාමිනේ), popularly known as Denawaka Hamine, was an actress in Sri Lankan cinema and television. Known as "The grand old lady" of Sinhala cinema, she appeared more than 300 films and teledramas in a career spanned more than four decades.

== Personal life ==
Denawaka Hamine was born 20 February 1906 in Kimbulgoda, Gampaha. After completing education from kimbulgoda Vidyalaya, she became a teacher at the school.

She had one daughter, Edith Senarath Yapa. She had three grandchildren, all three were involved in cinema. Anura Senarath Yapa who acted in the film Sama. Palitha Senarath Yapa acted in the films Dasa Nisa and Pethigomara. Palitha later became the head of the sports division of the Sri Lanka Rupavahini Corporation. Youngest one, Udaya Bandara Senarath Yapa starred in the film Dandu Monara. Son-in-law Theja Bandara Senarath worked as a supervisor at Yapa Port Cargo Corporation.

She died on 9 December 2002 at the age of 96.

== Career ==
She was by profession a school teacher until a chance encounter with G. D. L. Perera when she accompanied a young actress to a theatrical audition, led to her winning the role of an elderly mother in Perera's play Kandulu. Due to her masterful performance in the role, GDL brought Hamine into his drama group Kala Pela; she would play in Kala Pela productions like Manamalayo, Sakkarawattang and Sama (as Nonnohamy) and was honored with a merit award at the 1964 Arts Council Drama Festival for her role in Totupola.

Hamine's debut film role was in the film adaption of Sama (1965) by GDL reprising the role she had popularized in the play. In Sath Samudura (1968) she played the mother of two fishermen to much critical rave. She was presented a Best Character Actress Award for the role by a special government council. It was delivered on stage by the then Sri Lankan prime minister Dudley Senanayake.

In the 1970s, Hamine had major roles in Tun Man Handiya, Desa Nisa Kolomba Sanniya and Matara Achchi. She continued to perform the elderly woman character. She played to Western audiences with a small role in Indiana Jones and the Temple of Doom as a weeping mother in 1984. In 1987, she was awarded the Kalasuri title. Her best scene in cinema came through Sath Samudura as the mother of Edmund Wijesinghe and Cyril Wickramage who starred in that film. In 1968, she won the Award for Best Actress of the Year for her role in Sath Samudura at the Sarasaviya Film Festival.

Hamine did work in television with roles in teledramas like Kopi Kade in which she made the original cast. In 1998 she received an honorary award for her contributions to Sinhala Cinema from the Sri Lankan president Chandrika Kumaratunga.

== Filmography ==
Year	Title	Role	Ref.
1965	Saama	Nonnohamy	
1966	Sihina Hathak	Isabella	
1966	Kinkini Paada		
1967	Sath Samudura	Gunadasa's mother	
1967	Saru Bima		
1967	Sadol Kandulu	Servant	
1967	Iwasana Danaa		
1967	Evasana dana		
1967	Raena Giraw	Dissa's granny	
1968	Hangi Hora		
1968	Dahasak Sithuvili	Lalith's mother	
1968	Wanasara		
1968	London Hamu		
1969	Romeo Juliet Kathawak		
1969	Kawuda Hari	Mother	
1969	Hari Maga	Banda caretaker	
1969	Hanthane Kathawa		
1970	Thun Man Handiya	Sirisena's granny	
1970	Lakseta Kodiya	Pinsiri's mother	
1970	Nim Walalla		
1971	Poojithayo	Ango	
1971	Seeye Nottuwa		
1971	Bindunu Hadawath		
1971	Samanala Kumariyo		
1971	Sahanaya		
1972	Desa Nisa	Mother	
1972	Wehilihini		
1972	Lokuma Hinawa	Kabi 'Hami'	
1972	Miringuwa		
1973	Matara Achchi	Matara Achchi	
1974	Hadawath Naththo		
1974	Sheela	Prospective Voter Achchi	
1974	Sagarika		
1974	Lasanda	Parakrama's granny	
1974	Wasthuwa		
1974	Rodi Gama		
1975	Pem Kurullo		
1975	Raththaran Amma	Granny	
1975	Kohoma Kiyannada	Sudu Nanda	
1975	Cyril Malli		
1975	Kokilayo		
1975	Ranwan Rekha		
1975	Jeewana Geethaya		
1975	Sikuruliya	Namali's aunt	
1975	Hadawathaka Wasanthaya		
1975	Desa Nisa	Nirukada's mother	
1976	Kolamba Sanniya	Sister	
1976	Madol Duwa	Net trapped homeowner	
1976	Loka Horu		
1976	Walmathwuwo	Maggie	
1976	Hulawali	Villager	
1977	Sudu Paraviyo	Chandi's mother	
1977	Sikuru Dasawa		
1977	Maruwa Samaga Wase	Granny	
1977	Pembara Madhu		
1977	Yakadaya	Granny	
1978	Kumara Kumariyo	Granny	
1978	Janaka Saha Manju	Granny	
1978	Vishmaya	Janaka's granny	
1978	Selinage Walawwa	Granny	
1979	Palagetiyo	Sarath's mother	
1979	Eka Hitha		
1979	Sawudan Jema	Sawdan's granny	
1979	Podi Malli	Siri's mother	
1979	Wisihathara Peya		
1980	Anuhasa		
1980	Parithyagaya	Jayathilaka's mother	
1980	Bamvara Pahasa		
1980	Raja Dawasak		
1980	Paara Dige		
1980	Hansa Vilak	Granny	
1980	Kinduru Kumari	Elsie Nona	
1981	Mihidum Sihina		
1981	Ridee Thella		
1981	Geethika		
1981	Sathara Diganthaya		
1982	Deweni Gamana	Unmarried old aunt	
1982	Bambara Geethaya		
1982	Adhishtana		
1982	Pethi Gomara	Dhansukha's mother	
1982	Anuradha		
1982	Majora Sir		
1983	Chutte	Nanda	
1983	Sister Mary	Sumedha's mother	
1984	Indiana Jones and the Temple of Doom	Villager Woman #2	
1984	Wadula	Sovida's mother	
1984	Arunata Pera	Mother	
1984	Ranmalige Wasanawa	Granny	
1985	Adara Kathawa		
1986	Soora Saradiyel	Pinchohamy	
1986	Dinuma	Granny	
1987	Sathyagrahanaya	Cartoonist's mother	
1987	Mangala Thegga		
1987	Kawuluwa		
1987	Ahinsa	Party guest	
1988	Sandakada Pahana	Hospital resident	
1988	Angulimala		
1988	Sagara Jalaya Madi Handuwa Oba Sanda	Upasika aunty	
1990	Jaya Kothanada		
1991	Dolosmahe Pahana		
1991	Salambak Handai		
1991	Golu Muhude Kunatuwa		
1992	Viyaru Minisa		
1993	Ordinary Magic	Vani	
1993	Lagin Giyoth Aehek Na		
1993	Meeharaka	Grandmother	
1994	Le livre de cristal	Vielle dame de la pension	
1994	Abhiyogaya		
1994	Nohadan Landune		
1994	Ahas Maliga		
1994	150 Mulleriyawa	Kiri Amma	
1994	Anoma		
1994	Mee Haraka	Granny	
1997	Apaye Thappara 8400k		
1998	Channa Kinnari		
2002	Seethala Gini Kandu		
