= Thalatha Gunasekara =

Sri Lankan actress (1937-2003)

- තලතා ගුණසේකර
- Born: Abeykoon Mudiyanselage Thalatha Abeykoon; 17 July 1937; Kandy, Sri Lanka
- Died: 17 September 2003 (aged 66); Kandy, Sri Lanka
- Other name: Thalatha Abeykoon
- Education: Hillwood College
- Occupations: Actress, film producer, screenwriter, lyricist
- Years active: 1963–2002
- Spouse: Stanley Gunasekara
- Children: 4 Including Nadeeka Gunasekara
- Parents: Tikiri Banda Abeykoon (father); Leelawathi Abeykoon Menike (mother)
- Relatives: Vidya de Saram (daughter)

Abeykoon Mudiyanselage Thalatha Abeykoon (17 July 1937 – 17 September 2003 as Sinhala: තලතා ගුණසේකර) [Sinhala]), popularly known as Thalatha Gunasekara, was an actress in Sri Lankan cinema. She is the mother of popular actress Nadeeka Gunasekara.

== Personal life ==
Gunasekara was born on 17 July 1937 in Gampola, Kandy, Sri Lanka as the eldest of the family with five siblings. Her father, Tikiri Banda Abeykoon from Gampola was a Government Health Inspector. Her mother, Leelawathi Abeykoon Menike had the longest surname in the history of Sri Lanka castes where her birth name was Akkada Mukkada Weera Rambukkada Rambuke Jayagath Diyathilaka Koralege Ilanganthilaka Mudiyanselage Leelawathi Ilanganthilaka. It was a noble caste of Kandy who paid homage to the Sacred Tooth Relic with jasmine flowers. Thalatha had two younger sisters, Sita and Sri Kanthi; and two younger brothers, Senarath and Sena.

She received her primary education at Kingswood College, Kandy. After that, she studied at Hillwood College, Kandy amidst the strict rules of his parents. At school, she studied western music and got prizes for playing the piano.

She was married to Dissanayake Wijesuriya Stanley Gunasekara from Udahenatenna. He worked at Nawalapitiya and Pussellawa post offices. He later served as the Deputy Postmaster General. The couple had one son: Priyantha and four daughters: Nadeeka, Ganga, Vidya and Yamuna, all are actresses. Stanley died on 18 April 2010.

Nadeeka was born on 13 May 1958 in Kandy. In 1973, she attended Pushpadana Girls' College, Kandy and finally to Vishaka College, Bandarawela. She completed A/L from the art stream in Mahamaya Girls' College, Kandy. She is married to businessman Suren Hapuarachchi and in 2004, the couple had one daughter, Thenuki Sehansa. She is an actress who starred in several popular blockbuster films in Sinhala cinema including; Kanchana, Chanchala Rekha, Biththi Hathara, Thani Tharuwa, Ahinsa, Oba Mata Wiswasai, Angara Dangara and Daruwane.

Nadeeka's sister Ganga acted in the films Adishtana, Okkoma Rajawaru and Kanchana. Vidya acted in the films Adishtana and Me Desa Kumatada whereas and Yamuna acted in the teledrama Hingana Kolla.

She died on 17 September 2003 at the age of 66.

== Early life ==
After passing the Senior Examination in English medium, she went to Zahira College, Gampola to do further University Entrance. While studying at University Entrance, the principal assigned to teach senior students as well. At the age of 17, she received her first appointment as an English Assistant Teacher at St. Andrew's College, Nawalapitiya where she got to teach her peers. Some popular students were Jenny Winifrida (film actress) and K.S. Venkat (Film Director) and Ahangama Piyasena (Film Actors). In 1957, she was appointed as an English teacher in the Government College, Pussellawa.

== Cinema career ==
Thalatha became interested in acting in a film after seeing Rukmani Devi's performance. This passion grew up when she saw Wimala Vanzia, a friend who lived in Gampola, playing the lead role in the film Dingiri Menika in 1955. One day Wimala forcibly asked Thalatha for a photo and sent it to the producer of the film Deiyanne Rate, S. V. D. S. Somaratnethe. Then Somaratne sent the photo to director Ramachandran. Later, she was cast in the lead role of 'Katherine', but she did not get the chance because of her parents' strong reluctance.

After her marriage, she received an invitation from renowned filmmaker Lester James Peries. During this time the filming of 'Gamperaliya' has begun. She was selected for the role 'Nanda' in the film. However, she lost the role because she is taller than Gamini Fonseka and Henry Jayasena who played the lead roles.

After few years, she sent an application for a film that Cinemas was producing without a name after seen an advertisement in the 'Sunday Observer' newspaper. In 1963, she made her maiden cinema appearance with the film Adata Wadiya Hitha Hondai directed by Indian filmmaker Masthan. In the film, she played the kind wife of the villain played by Christy Leonard Perera. Her first lead role came through the film Sapatha Soya as a wife beaten by a drunken husband.

Then she appeared in several early Sinhala films including, Suba Sarana Sepa Sithe, Samiya Birindage Deviyaya and Patachara. Some of her most dramatic roles came through the film Abhirahasa where she plays the stepmother who falls in love with Vijaya Kumaratunga, a servant of a wealthy household. Then she made a critically acclaimed role of 'Namakka' in the film Podi Malli. Then she appeared several blockbuster films such as Nidhanaya, Sikuruliya, Davena Pipasaya, Hathara Denama Surayo, Hingana Kolla, Sadahatama Oba Mage, Apeksha, Nomiyena Minisun and Maldeniye Simion.

In 1998, she became a film producer and screenwriter with the 1998 film Aye Obata Barai.

== Filmography ==
Year	Film	Role	Ref.
1963	Adata Vediya Heta Hondai		
1964	Suba Sarana Sepa Sithe		
1964	Patachara		
1964	Samiya Birindage Deviyaya		
1965	Sepatha Soya	Shantha	
1966	Sihina Hathak	Anula	
1966	Kommissar X	Bartender	
1966	Sanda Naga Eddi		
1967	Rena Giraw	Villager	
1967	Okkoma Hari		
1967	Sura Chauraya		
1968	Singithi Surathal		
1968	Golu Hadawatha		
1968	Bicycle Hora		
1968	Indunila		
1968	Ataweni Pudumaya		
1969	Kohomada Wade		
1969	Paara Walalu		
1969	Pancha		
1970	Aathma Pooja		
1971	Abhirahasa	Mrs. Wanigasekara, step mother	
1971	Davena Pipasa		
1971	Hathara Denama Surayo	Nilmini's step-mother	
1972	Nidhanaya	Willie's childhood nanny	
1972	Veeduru Gewal	Menaka's lure 'Ira'	
1972	Me Desa Kumatada	Vijay's mother	
1972	Vanaraja	Assistant Director	
1974	Vasthuwa		
1974	Kasthuri Suwanda	Maya	
1975	Suraya Surayamai		
1975	Sikuruliya		
1976	Loka Horu		
1977	Sakunthala		
1977	Sikuru Dasawa		
1978	Janaka Saha Manju	Manju's mother	
1978	Apeksha		
1978	Ahasin Polowata		
1979	Samanmali		
1979	Hingana Kolla	Annie	
1979	Raja Kolla	Hopper seller	
1979	Anusha	Mrs. Ratnayake's sister	
1979	Podi Malli	Nam 'Akka'	
1980	Kanchana		
1980	Sasaraka Pathum		
1981	Vajira	Vajira's aunt	
1981	Chanchala Rekha	Sirisena and Chutti's mother	
1982	Sakvithi Suwaya	Malini's sister-in-law	
1982	Thani Tharuwa	Tanuja	
1982	Jeewithayen Jeewithayak		
1982	Sithara		
1983	Samuganimi Ma Samiyani		
1983	Hasthi Viyaruwa		
1983	Hithath Hondai Wedath Hondai		
1984	Binari Saha Sudu Banda	Yaso	
1984	Sahodariyakage Kathawa		
1984	Birinda		
1985	Kirimaduwal		
1986	Maldeniye Simion	Rosalin	
1987	Yugayen Yugayata		
1989	Sebaliyo		
1991	Salambak Handai		
1991	Sihina Ahase Wasanthaya		
1991	Keli Madala	Sugala	
1991	Bambara Kalapaya		
1992	Sisila Gini Gani	Mrs. Dunuwilla	
1992	Chandi Rajina		
1992	Me Ware Mage		
1992	Oba Mata Wishwasai		
1992	Sinhayangeth Sinhaya	Rohini's mother	
1993	Sagara Thilina		
1993	Bambasara Bisaw		
1994	Nomiyena Minisun		
1995	Rodaya		
1996	Anantha Rathriya	Narmada's mother	
1996	Sihina Vimane Kumariya	Nilmini's mother	
1996	Mal Hathai		
1997	Puthuni Mata Wasana		
1997	Goodbye Tokyo		
1998	Aeya Obata Barai	Sahan's Auntie, Screenwriter, Producer, Lyricist	
1998	Anthima Reya		
1999	Ayadimi Samaa	Tikiri's mother	
1999	Anduru Sewaneli		
1999	Mandakini		
2000	Anuragaye Ananthaya	Scholarship reneger	
2001	Poronduwa		
2002	Surapurata Kanyaviyak		
