= Daya Alwis =

Sri Lankan actor and director

- දයා අල්විස්
- Born: Thuiappuarachchi Don Daya de Alwis; November 7, 1942; Induruwagoda, Payagala, Sri Lanka
- Died: April 27, 2015 (aged 72); Sri Jayawardenapura Hospital, Colombo
- Education: Kalutara Vidyalaya
- Occupations: Actor, Dramatist
- Years active: 1976–2014
- Spouse: Yamuna Dayangani (m. 1978)
- Children: 2

Thuiappuarachchi Don Daya de Alwis (born 7 November 1942 – died 27 April 2015 as දයා අල්විස්) [Sinhala]), popularly known as Daya Alwis, was an actor in Sri Lankan cinema, stage drama and television. He was also a screenwriter and director. He directed about six teledramas. He was the first person in Sri Lanka to receive an award covering all three areas - stage drama, cinema and teledrama.

He died on 27 April 2015 at the age of 72, while receiving treatment at a hospital after an accident a week earlier.

== Personal life ==
Daya Alwis was born on 7 November 1942 in Payagala as the fourth son of the family with seven siblings. He completed his education from Kalutara Vidyalaya. In 1956 at the age of 14, he sang the song Laa Dalu Wanamal. After finishing Bhathkande degree, he joined Tholangamuwa Central College as a music teacher. He made his first drama, Girikuta, at the school.

He was married to Yamuna Dayangani and they had two sons - Sarangadeva and Sapumal Bandara.

== Acting career ==
Before entering acting, Alwis traveled to India in 1964 to study music in Bhatkhande Music Institute Deemed University and worked as a sound mixer for on stage events. In 1966, he produced his first film. He started his acting career with stage dramas, Depano, Modara Mola, Ekadhipathi, Kaluware Jaramare, Ran Kanda, such as Sarathchandra's Premathi Jayathi Soko and Kalu Walalu, Gunasena Galapththi's Muhudu Puttu, Henry Jayasena's Makarã Saha Gamanak, Dharmasiri Bandara's Kakarasaya, Dawala Beehishana, Somalatha Subasinghe's Vikurthi and Jayantha Chandrasiri's Môra. His own production Dalpadadu was shown on 6 and 13 October in Sweden and again in October at Harrow and later at the University of London, Westminster. His stage drama Parasthawa also played in London and Birmingham. Some of the stage dramas he directed include Aganthukayo and K Sara. He is the screenplay writer and assistant director for the film Sinhabahu.

== Television career ==
Alwis is one of the earliest pillars of Sinhala teledrama history. He made history as the first person who wrote and acted in the first drama, La Hiru Dahasak, broadcast on Sri Lankan television. He also wrote screenplay for the dramas Awarjanaa, Punarawarthana and Bodima. His maiden teledrama direction came through Chandra Yamaya. He acted in the critically acclaimed serial Weda Hamine and then in Chandrayamaya. His most popular television acting came through the Bodima and Paba television serials. He also starred in Ira Bata Taruwa, the first Sri Lankan teledrama filmed in London. In 2001, he directed the serial Awasan Horawa, telecast on ITN channel every Friday at 7.30 p.m. from January 5.

=== Selected Television serials ===
- Awarjanaa
- Awasan Horawa
- Bhagya
- Bodima
- Chandrayamaya
- Gal Pilimaya Saha Bol Pilimaya
- Ganga ha Nissanka
- Hikmiya
- Hiruta Muwawen
- Ira Batu Tharuwa
- Kokila Wilapaya
- Kota Uda Mandira
- La Hiru Dahasak
- Makara Vijithaya
- Manmulawu Mama
- Nirsathwayo
- Niwataya
- Paba
- Parasathu Malak
- Pathok Palama
- Pinsara Dosthara
- Pitagamkarayo
- Punarawarthana
- Ranthaliya Walawwa
- Samanala Gamanak
- Sandagalathenna
- Sathya
- Sathyaya
- Siri Sirimal
- Vasudha
- Wanasarana
- Wassana Sihinaya
- Weda Hamine

== Death ==
On 20 April 2015 he met with an accident at Bokundara, Piliyandala with a three-wheeler. He went home without any medications as no any external bleeding had taken place. However, his head had received a contusion and internal bleeding had occurred. He was rushed to the Sri Jayawardenapura Hospital. He underwent treatment at Neurological Unit for severe bleeding in his brain. He died on 27 April around 3:50 am, due to internal bleeding while receiving treatment at the hospital.

== Filmography ==
Alwis started his film career with Amarnath Jayatilaka's 1976 film Thilake Ha Thilaka. Then he acted in more than 40 films. Some of his popular cinema acting came through Kolamba Sanniya, Madol Duwa, Sarungalaya, Pooja, Maya as well as Wasantha Obeysekara’s Walmathwuwo, where he was nominated for national awards.

- No. denotes the number of Sri Lankan film in the Sri Lankan cinema.

Year	No.	Film	Role	Ref.
1976		Thileka Ha Thilaka	Mr. Madegoda	
1976		Madol Duwa	Punchi Mahaththaya	
1976		Kolamba Sanniya	Saralis 'Cyril Costa'	
1976		Selinage Walawwa	Anta	
1978		Bambaru Avith	Priest	
1978		Ahasin Polawata		
1979		Wasanthaye Dawasak	Sarath's friend	
1979		Chuda Manikya	Railway constable	
1979		Handaya	Commentator box viewer	
1980		Uthumaneni		
1980		Jodu Walalu		
1980		Siribo Ayya	Sadiris	
1980		Karumakkarayo	Deniya Mahathaya	
1980		Sinhabahu		
1981		Saaranga		
1982		Maha Gedara	Appuhamy	
1983		Niliyakata Pem Kalemi	Timber businessman	
1983		Dadayama	Minister	
1983		Menik Maliga		
1984		Maya		
1985		Mihidum Salu	Tala Munda	
1985		Wathsala Akka		
1986		Maldeniye Simion	Charlie	
1986		Pooja		
1987		Viragaya	Kulasekara	
1990		Dese Mal Pipila		
1991		Golu Muhude Kunatuwa		
1994		Sandamadala	School teacher	
1994		Mee Haraka	Bus driver	
1995		Maruthaya	Dharme's associate	
1995		Chitti		
1996		Loku Duwa		
1997		Visidela	Keerala	
1998		Anthima Reya		
1998		Julietge Bhumikawa	Lawrence	
1999		Rathu Aluyama	Proctor Weerawardena	
2003		Mother Teresa of Calcutta	Kaligarth seller	
2005		Water	Saduram	
2005		Sulanga	Salesman	
2008		Nil Diya Yahana		
2010		Uththara		
2013		Nikini Vassa		
2016		Paththini	Royal goldsmith	
2019		Sikuru Yogaya	Weda Mahaththaya	
