= Wally Nanayakkara =

Sri Lankan actor and lyricist

Wally Nanayakkara වොලී නානායක්කාර
- Born: Kurukula Arachchige Don Wally Nanayakkara; 7 June 1939; Nikaweratiya, Sri Lanka
- Died: 11 October 2003 (aged 64); Colombo, Sri Lanka
- Education: St. Benedict's College, Colombo; St. Anne's College, Kurunegala
- Occupations: Actor, lyricist
- Years active: 1964–2003
- Spouse: Nethalie Violet

Kurukula Arachchige Don Wally Nanayakkara (born 14 June 1939 – died 11 October 2003 as වොලී නානායක්කාර) [Sinhala]), popularly known as Wally Nanayakkara, was an actor in Sri Lankan cinema, theater and television.

== Personal life ==
Nanayakkara was born on 14 June 1939 in Nikaweratiya, Kurunegala. He completed education from St. Benedict's College, Colombo and St. Anne's College, Kurunegala.

He was married to fellow actress Nethalie Violet (née Nanayakkara). They were first met at Dalugama Catholic Church in Kelaniya in 1958. At the time, Nethalie worked at the Fordsroad Accounting Institute in Colombo. Nethalie has been worked in Radio Ceylon since 1955 in many radio plays. Nanayakkara joined the radio dramas in the 1960s. The couple first acted together in the radio play Muwan Palessa as "Ukku Banda" and "Binari". During his tenure at Lake House, Nanayakkara was also secretary of the Arts Circle. Nethalie continued to act in many television serials as well as films.

The couple has one son, Ravi; and four daughters: Renuka, Shamika and twins Chandika and Indika. His son Ravi is a doctor in Surgery at General Hospital, Colombo and his wife Sagarika is the director of the Maharagama Cancer Hospital.

Nanayakkara died on 11 October 2003 at the age of 64.

== Career ==
His passion to become an actor came after watching the movie Ashokamala. During school times in Kurunegala, Nanayakkara started a drama club and became secretary. Then he acted in the stage play Veniciye Welenda in the school stage. After school, she joined Nandagam's studio in Kandane to study film. But, he was assigned to wire the bulbs and cameras in every day and he fed up with the job.

His first public stage drama acting came through Handahana produced by T. B. Ilangaratne. Popular actress Sandhya Kumari also acted in a drama with him in that play for the first time. It was a ninety-year-old character. He was trained under the guidance of P. Welikala and J.S. H. Jayawardene for radio dramas. Then he acted in some popular stage plays including Sanwathsaraya and Mahadena Muththa saha Konda Kevuma by Mudalinayaka Somaratne, Sampatha by D.K. Jayawardena, Balana Kapolla by Welikala, Onna Babo Ethinniya and Hansa Geethaya by Dharmasiri Wickramaratne.

His maiden cinematic experience came through 1965 blockbuster hit Saaravita directed by Tissa Liyanasuriya with a villain role. Afterward, he received numerous roles in preceding movies such as Adarawanthayo, Bicycle Hora and Baduth Ekka Horu. He sang the song Ahase Tharu Gannina along with Gamini Fonseka and Joe Abeywickrama in the film Baduth Ekka Horu. He also appeared in some character roles in the films Senehasa, Pickpocket and Suli Sulang.

The 1973 film Matara Achchi was a milestone in Nanayakkara's film career. He played the lead role of "Gunapala Mudalali" and got a chance to write the lyrics of movie song Sandakada Pahanaka. The song also marked as Victor Ratnayake's first film musical direction as Sunil Edirisinghe's maiden movie song. Wally had a passion for both acting and farming, and was a talented cameraman as well. In 1971, he acted in the film. In this movie, he had a scene to suck blood from a goat. He performed the act well; however, the camera did not operate in the scene due to the cameraman's mistake.

In 1974, he acted in the film Wasthuwa, which was a souvenir of his cinema life. He acted in the film along with his son Ravi Nanayakkara. He acted in many adventurous scenes for his son in the film. Not only that, he also wrote the song "Guwan Gebe" to the film.

Nanayakkara's maiden television acting came through Niranandaya directed by Sudath Rohana. Then he appeared in few serials such as Wanawadule Wasanthaya, Piyabana Ashwaya, Iti Pahana, Nayana Mina and Sathyaa.

== Filmography ==
Year	Film	Role	Ref.
1965	Saaravita	Jayathunga Arachige Marcus	
1968	Bicycle Hora		
1968	Adarawanthayo	Christopher	
1969	Senehasa		
1969	Samaje Sathuro		
1969	Baduth Ekka Horu	Thilak	
1969	Pickpocket	Dharme	
1970	Suli Sulang		
1971	Pujithayo	Jayantha 'Bindu' Kedikare	
1971	Mahe Hene Riri Yaka	Ananda Livera	
1971	Abhirahasa	Mr. Wanigasekara's Proctor	
1973	Matara Achchi	Gunapala Mudalali	
1974	Wasthuwa		
1976	Pradeepe Ma Wewa		
1976	Gangaa		
1977	Sikuru Dasawa		
1978	Vishmaya	Village brawler	
1979	Muwan Palessa	Ukku Banda	
1980	Kanchana	Victor	
1984	Niwan Dakna Jathi Dakwa		
2003	Sudu Kaluwara	1st auction viewer	
