= Niluka =

Niluka (Sinhala: නිලූක/නිලූකා; Tamil: நிலுக) is a unisex given name found in Sri Lanka. Notable people with this name include:

- Niluka Ekanayake, a Sri Lankan politician and astrologer
- Niluka Geethani Rajasekara (born 1982), a Sri Lankan long-distance runner
- Niluka Karunaratne (born 1985), a Sri Lankan badminton player
- Niluka Karunaratne (cricketer) (born 1979), a Sri Lankan cricket player
