= Kolamba Sanniya =

1976 film

Kolomba Sanniya කොළඹ සන්නිය
- Directed by: Manik Sandrasagara
- Written by: Premnath Moraes
- Produced by: Tyronne Fernando
- Starring: Geetha Kumarasinghe; Joe Abeywickrema; Denawaka Hamine; Freddy Silva; Eddie Jayamanne; Don Sirisena
- Cinematography: Donald Karunaratna
- Edited by: Gladwin Fernando
- Music by: Sunil Shantha; Clarence Wijewardena
- Release date: 7 May 1976
- Country: Sri Lanka
- Language: Sinhala

Kolamba Sanniya (Colombo Mania) is a 1976 Sinhalese language comedy film directed by Manik Sandrasagara that follows the lives of middle and upper-class people in rural and urban Sri Lanka. The film stars Geetha Kumarasinghe, Joe Abeywickrema and Denewake Hamine.

== Synopsis ==
Andare, (Joe Abeywickrema) a rustic villager finds a valuable gem when he goes behind a bush to perform his morning ablutions. (no toilets in the village) He sells the gem and buys a house in Colombo. The whole family, Andare's elder sister (Denawaka Hamine), brother Jakolis (Eddie Jayamanne), son (Freddie Silva) and daughter (Geetha Kumarasinghe) try their best to get adjusted to the life of Colombo 7 - Cinnamon Gardens and as they find eventually, it is not an easy task.

== Cast ==
- Joe Abeywickrama as Uspiala Gedera Andiris 'Andare' Appuhamy
- Eddie Jayamanne as Jacolis
- Denawaka Hamine as Andare's elder sister
- Geetha Kumarasinghe as Susila
- Freddie Silva as Tarzan
- Daya Alwis as Saralis 'Cyril Costa'
- Kirthi Sri Karunaratne as Hickman Nilrvastera
- Don Sirisena as Saping
- Shanthi Lekha as Andare's younger sister
- Lucky Wickramanayake as Bathroom investment seeker
- Jayalath Fernando as Party nationalist politician
- Pujitha Mendis as Massage Parlor receptionist

== Music ==
The music in the film was composed by Sunil Santha and Clarence Wijewardena. The song Dum dama dama yana, Dum bara bage... was written by Father Marceline Jayakody and the music by maestro Sunil Santha. Music was also consulted by Sunil Mendis.

== Remake ==
The remake of the film was released on 21 September 2018 with the title Kolomba Sanniya Returns, starring Sarath Kothalawala, Rajitha Hiran and Menaka Madhuwanthi.
