= Lionel Deraniyagala =

Sri Lankan actor

- ලයනල් දැරණියගල
- Born: Lionel Danthanarayana; 24 August 1940; Galle, Sri Lanka
- Died: 30 July 1994 (aged 53); Colombo
- Education: Mahinda College
- Occupations: Actor, producer
- Years active: 1960–1994

Lionel Danthanarayana (born 24 August 1940 – died 30 July 1994 as ලයනල් දැරණියගල) [Sinhala]), popularly known by his stage name Lionel Deraniyagala, was an actor in Sri Lankan cinema and theater. One of the most popular villain artists ever in Sri Lankan film history, he had a career for more than three decades as the antagonist.

== Personal life ==
He was born on 24 August 1940 in Galle as the youngest of the family with three siblings. He completed his education at Mahinda College, Galle.

He was married to fellow actress Thilaka in 1973. The couple has one daughter, Priyanthi Shyamali, and one son, Chulananda.

In 1975, he was working in the batik industry with his wife. In 1981, he went Middle East for a job. He returned to Sri Lanka in 1983 and continued on business.

Deraniyagala fell ill at Ragama rehabilitation hospital after an accident on February 4, 1994. He died on 30 July 1994 at the age of 53.

== Career ==
He has acted in minor roles on the school stage. At the age of 14, he met popular film actor and filmmaker B. A. W. Jayamanne along with his closest friend and eventual film actor Senaka Perera. At that time, Jayamanne was preparing for the film Kale Handa and was looking for a young man to play the role of "John Jayapala". Although Senaka introduced Deraniyagala to Jayamanna, it was age that mattered. Jayamanne informed Deraniyagala to meet him after finishing school times. After completing his studies, he came to Colombo to find a job at the age of 20. In 1960, he was selected for the lead role in the film Ekolos Ginna directed by Gilbert Hewavitharana. Hewavitharana changed his birth name Danthanarayana to Deraniyagala. Although the film was not produced, he was left with the name "Deraniyagala".

While working as a booking clerk at Lionel Ceylon Theaters, he met filmmaker Roland Amarasinghe. Amarasinghe asked him to come to Navajeewana Theater for the screen test. He was selected for the lead role of "Udeni" in the 1966 film Kolamba Hadayo with the new actress Shirani Gunatilleke. Meanwhile, he was selected to the stage play Abhimanaya produced by Sudas Masakorala. Then in the 1969 film Mee Masso, he acted along with Gamini Fonseka and Sonia Disa.

Deraniyagala emerged as an antagonist in the 1971 blockbuster film Hathara Denama Soorayo directed by Neil Rupasinghe. After the film, popular actor Eddie Jayamanne appreciated his villain role and said that "You are the best villain after Dommy Jayawardena". Since that, he received several villain roles in popular films Rena Giraw, Ran Onchilla, Rajagedara Paraviyo, Edath Suraya Adath Suraya, Gijulihiniyo, Kesara Sinhayo, Ridee Thella, Kasthuri Suwanda and Raja Kello. He played the lead role in the 1979 film Sawdan Jema bringing a sense of humor. He also played a caricature in the 1973 film Sinawai Inawai and then Deraniyagala played a different role as Gamini Fonseka's brother in the 1978 film Apsara.

Deraniyagala acted with his wife in few films including Gijulihiniyo, Vanarayo and Raja Kollo. After had children, his wife quit acting.

He acted in a few stage plays such as Suli Sulang and Rella. The film, titled Neethiyada Shakthiyada, was released on 13 January 1995 and was screened as Inspector Geetha, where Deraniyagala was the producer.

In 1990, Deraniyagala won a Merit Award for the film Randenigala Sinhaya at the Sarasaviya Film Festival.

== Filmography ==
Year	Film	Role	Ref.
1966	Kolamba Hadayo	Udeni Deraniyagala	
1967	Manamalayo		
1969	Hari Maga	Percy	
1969	Mee Masso		
1969	Hathara Peraliya		
1970	Akkara Paha	Doctor	
1971	Kesara Sinhayo	Sankara 'Kesara Sinhaya'	
1971	Pujithayo	Sidney	
1971	Ran Onchilla		
1971	Hathara Denama Surayo	Harry	
1971	Samanala Kumariyo		
1972	Edath Suraya Adath Suraya	Dickie	
1973	Suhada Pethuma		
1973	Sinawai Inawai		
1973	Hondai Narakai		
1974	Kasthuri Suwanda	Bandara Hamu	
1974	Rodi Gama	Kirivanthey	
1975	Pem Kurullo		
1975	Gijulihiniyo		
1975	Rajagedara Paraviyo		
1975	Sadhana		
1975	Hadawathaka Wasanthaya		
1975	Hitha Honda Minihek		
1976	Nayana		
1976	Vanarayo		
1976	Haratha Hathara		
1977	Hithuwakkarayo		
1977	Hariyanakota Ohoma Thamai		
1977	Sajaa		
1977	Chin Chin Nona		
1978	Madhuwanthi	Ashok 'Manager'	
1978	Apsara		
1979	Raja Kollo	Pala	
1979	Sawdan Jema	Raja 'Sawdan Jema'	
1979	Visihathara Peya	Amare	
1980	Sinhabahu		
1980	Sabeetha	Mr. Sirisena	
1981	Sathkulu Pawwa	Wilbert	
1981	Ridee Thalla		
1981	Dayabara Nilu	Superintendent 'Loku Mahaththaya'	
1982	Anuradha		
1982	Sumithuro	Suranga	
1983	Loku Thaththa		
1985	Mawbima Nathinam Maranaya		
1989	Sinasenna Raththaran		
1989	Mamai Raja	Ranjith Weerawardena	
1989	Randenigala Sinhaya	Hamu	
1990	Chandi Raja		
1990	Jaya Shakthi		
1990	Yukthiyata Wada	Mr. Samaraweera	
1991	Paaradise		
1991	Cheriyo Doctor	Chance	
1991	Aibaba Saha Horu Hathaliha		
1991	Bambara Kalapaya		
1992	Sathya		
1992	Malsara Doni		
1992	Sinha Raja		
1993	Sasara Sarisarana Thek		
1993	Surayan Athara Veeraya	Rohitha 'Boss'	
1994	150 Mulleryawa	Jamis Jayatunga 'Mudalali'	
1994	Mawbime Veerayo		
1995	Chandiyage Putha	Corrupt Inspector	
1995	Cheriyo Captain	Partygoer	
1995	Inspector Geetha	Ravi	
1995	Deviyani Sathya Surakinna	Rex Mayadunna 'Rathu'	
2000	Undaya	Seram 'Hamu'	
2001	Kolamba Koloppan		
2006	Supiri Balawatha		
2007	Hai Master		
