= Akkara Paha =

1970 film

- Milton Jayawardena (as Sena) and Anoma Wattaldeniya (as Sadha) in a scene from the film
- Directed by: Lester James Peries
- Written by: Tissa Abeysekera; Madawala S. Rathnayake (book)
- Produced by: P. E. E. Anthonypillai
- Starring: Milton Jayawardena; Anoma Wattaladeniya; Malini Fonseka; Janaki Kurukulasuriya
- Cinematography: M. S. Ananda
- Edited by: Sumitra Gunawardana
- Music by: W.D. Amaradeva
- Distributed by: Ceylon Studios
- Release date: 8 May 1970
- Running time: 128 min
- Country: Sri Lanka
- Language: Sinhala

Akkara Paha (Sinhala, Five Acres of Land) is a 1970 Sri Lankan drama film directed by Lester James Peries, with the screenplay dialogue and script by Tissa Abeysekara. The film stars Milton Jayawardena as Sena, Anoma Wattaladeniya as Sadha and Malini Fonseka as Kumari.

Tissa Abeysekera adapted Madawela S. Rathnayake's book as a follow-up to Golu Hadawatha. The film received an indifferent response in Sri Lanka, but was well-received when shown in New York at the Museum of Modern Art's festival.

== Plot ==
Sena (Milton Jayawardena) is sent to a boarding school at a well-to-do city university by his family who mortgage everything they own to pay for his education. Their future well-being is thus in the hands of Sena. However, Sena succumbs to the temptations of city life and fails in his venture.

The impoverished family takes on the titular scheme offered by the government to settle the North Central province.

== Cast ==
- Milton Jayawardena as Sena Medawatta
- Janaki Kurukulasuriya as Theresa Perera
- Malini Fonseka as Kumari 'Akka'
- Anoma Wattaladeniya as Sandhawathie 'Sandha'
- Gamini Wijesuriya as Banda Medawatta 'Thaththa'
- Shanthi Lekha as Sena's Amma
- Douglas Ranasinghe as Samarasena 'Samarey'
- Sriyani Perera as Sujatha Gajanayake
- Shirani Kurukulasuriya as Leena Perera
- Ruby de Mel as Mrs. Perera 'Mamma'
- Basil de Saram as Ranjith Perera
- Seetha Kumari as Sandha's Amma
- Amarasiri Kalansuriya as Gunapala
- Wijeratne Warakagoda as Teacher
- Mapa Gunaratne as Loku Iskola Mahattaya
- Lionel Deraniyagala as Doctor
