= Binaramalee =

1969 Sri Lankan drama film

Binaramalee බිනරමලී
- Directed by: Mudalinayaka Somaratne
- Written by: Tissa Abeysekara
- Based on: Radio drama Muwan Palessa
- Produced by: Mudalinayaka Somaratne
- Starring: Swarna Kahawita; Wickrama Bogoda; Piyadasa Gunasekera; Shanthi Lekha; D. R. Nanayakkara
- Cinematography: D. B. Nihalsinghe
- Edited by: D. B. Nihalsinghe
- Music by: Somadasa Elvitigala
- Release date: 10 August 1969
- Country: Sri Lanka
- Language: Sinhala

Binaramalee (Sinhala: බිනරමලී) is a 1969 Sri Lankan Sinhala drama thriller film directed and produced by Mudalinayaka Somaratne as his maiden directorial venture. It stars Swarna Kahawita and Wickrama Bogoda in lead roles along with Piyadasa Gunasekera, Shanthi Lekha and D. R. Nanayakkara with supportive roles. Music composed by Somadasa Elvitigala.

It is the 200th Sri Lankan film in the Sinhala cinema. It is the first Sri Lanka film based on a radio drama, which was made by director himself as a radio drama Muwan Palessa.

The film received critically acclaim and became a blockbuster of that year. The film received several awards at 1970 Sarasaviya Awards ceremony including, Best Film, Best Actress and Best Director.

== Cast ==
- Swarna Kahawita as Binaramali
- Wickrama Bogoda as Sinno
- Piyadasa Gunasekera as Veddikaraya
- D. R. Nanayakkara as Arachchila
- Mudalinayaka Somaratne as Sudu Banda
- Shanthi Lekha as Kiri Amma
- Gemunu Wijesuriya as Ranhamy
- Sumana Amarasinghe as Sobani
- Dharma Sri Munasinghe as Guru Hamy
- Kingsley Dissanayake as Golu Banda
- Cyril Wickramage as Singer
- Wijeratne Warakagoda as Heen Banda
- A. P. Gunaratne as Dandoniye Rala
- Devika Karunaratne
- Annesley Dias as Loku Appuhamy
- Samuel Rodrigo
- Berty Gunathilake

== Awards ==
=== 1970 Sarasaviya Awards ===
Category	Artist	Result
Best Film,	Binaramalee	Won
Best Actress	Swarna Kahawita	Won
Best Director	Mudalinayaka Somaratne	Won
Best Supporting Actor	Piyadasa Gunasekara	Won
Best Supporting Actress	Shanthi Lekha	Won
Best Script Writer	Tissa Abeysekara	Won
Best Songwriter	Mahagama Sekara	Won
Best Male Playback Singer	W. D. Amaradeva	Won
