= Bandu Munasinghe =

Sri Lankan actor and stunt director

- බන්දු මුණසිංහ
- Born: Munasinghe Arachchilage Don Bandu; 16 March 1936; Borella, Sri Lanka
- Died: 5 February 2005 (aged 68); Embilipitiya, Sri Lanka
- Education: Hewavitharana College, Rajagiriya Nalanda College, Colombo
- Occupations: Actor, Stunt Director
- Years active: 1958–1987
- Spouse: Jayanthi Munasinghe (m. 1967)

Munasinghe Arachchilage Don Bandu (16 March 1936 – 5 February 2005 as බන්දු මුණසිංහ [Sinhala]), popularly known as Bandu Munasinghe, was an actor, and stunt director of Sri Lankan cinema. Particularly acted in cinema in villain roles, Munasinghe was the first stunt director of the Sri Lankan silver screen.

== Personal life ==
He was born on 16 March 1936 in Borella. He first studied at Hewavitharana College, Rajagiriya and his secondary education at Nalanda College, Colombo. He excelled as a boxer. Because of this, he joined the army for a while after school and showed boxing skills.

He was married to Jayanthi Munasinghe where the wedding was celebrated on 16 March 1967.

Munasinghe, who had been a movie star for thirty-five years, suddenly fell ill in 1993. He went to Embilipitiya in Ratnapura where one of his leg was amputated. He died on 5 February 2005 at the age of 69.

== Career ==
In 1958, he was invited in perform stunts to a film by M.P. Gilman and M.P. Gemunu, both stuntmen. They informed Munasinghe to be at Kiribathgoda Sirisena Wimalaweera's Nawajeevana studio at about 10 am. In Nawajeevana studio, he performed his maiden cinematic appearance in the film Ma Ale Kala Tharuniya. The second movie starring Munasinghe as a stuntman was Gilman's 1961 directorial hit Wedibima. Then he acted in the films, Daskon, Wena Swargayak Kumatada, Deepashika and Getawarayo. In 1965, he was selected for a villain role for the first time in his career in the film Saaravita. Later, he played as the stuntman in the films such as Dheewarayo, Satha Panaha, Sweep Ticket and Daru Duka.

He continued to work as the henchman in several movies for major villain characters most notably in the films, Surayangeth Suraya, Edath Suraya Adath Suraya, Hathara Denama Surayo, Singapore Charlie, Suli Sulang and Hitha Honda Minihek. His major breakthrough in cinema came through as the stunt director in the 1964 film Sithaka Mahima directed by M. S. Ananda. However, his first character role came through the film Tharangaa directed by Sena Dayananda. In the 1975 film Rajagedara Paraviyo by Sathischandra Edirisinghe, Munasinghe along with fellow stuntman Alexander Fernando created good realistic fight scenes.

He is also a skilled sword fight expert. He learned about sword fighting from Gamini Fonseka and H. D. Kulatunga. Among the characters played by Munasinghe were the scenes where the lead actress was tortured most notably in the film Awa Soya Adare. In the 1970s, he played the character roles of Agra Sajeewani and Manel Wanaguru in the films Sugandhi (1979) and Tharangaa (1975) respectively.

== Filmography & Stunt Coordination ==
Year	Film	Acting role	Other roles	Ref.
1959	Ma Ale Kala Tharuniya	Augie	Minor stuntman	
1961	Wedibima	Police inspector		
1962	Daskon			
1963	Wena Swargayak Kumatada			
1963	Deepashika	Train track abductor		
1964	Sithaka Mahima		Stunt coordinator	
1964	Getawarayo	Boxer		
1965	Handapaana			
1965	Laa Dalu			
1965	Saaravita	Somey		
1965	Hithata Hitha			
1965	Satha Panaha	Assailant near Sheela's home		
1965	Sweep Ticket			
1966	Sanda Naga Eddi			
1967	Sorungeth Soru			
1967	Daru Duka	Police Inspector		
1967	Sarana			
1967	Hitha Giya Thena			
1969	Hari Maga	Norbert henchman		
1969	Surayangeth Suraya			
1970	Lakseta Kodiya	Party guest		
1970	Dan Mathakada	Jerry		
1970	Aathma Pooja			
1970	Ohoma Hondada			
1970	Suli Sulang			
1971	Dawena Pipasa			
1971	Hathara Denama Surayo			
1971	Samanala Kumariyo			
1972	Edath Suraya	Bandu		
1972	Sujeewa		Stunt Coordinator	
1972	Singapore Charlie			
1973	Matara Achchi	Cyril's friend		
1973	Gopalu Handa			
1973	Handama Welawa			
1973	Sunethra	Debt Collector	Stunt Coordinator	
1973	Hondai Narakai			
1973	Hondata Hondai	Bandu		
1974	Kasthuri Suwanda		Stunt Coordinator	
1974	Susee	Harry	Stunt Coordinator	
1975	Hitha Honda Minihek		Stunt Coordinator	
1975	Tharangaa	Jerry	Stunt Coordinator	
1975	Awa Soya Adare		Stunt Coordinator	
1975	Kokilayo		Stunt Coordinator	
1975	Rajagedara Paraviyo	Bandu		
1975	Lassana Dawasak	Bandu	Stunt Coordinator	
1975	Hadawathaka Wasanthaya			
1975	Sangeetha		Stunt Coordinator	
1975	Nayanaa			
1976	Kawuda Raja	Henchman		
1976	Harima Badu Thunak	Sidaran's friend		
1976	Vanarayo			
1976	Loka Horu			
1976	Hariyata Hari		Stunt Coordinator	
1976	Onna Mame Kella Panapi			
1976	Ran Thilaka			
1977	Sakunthala			
1977	Sri Madara	Franklin	Stunt Coordinator	
1977	Chin Chin Nona			
1977	Siripala Saha Ran Menika	Piyadasa		
1977	Tom Pachaya	Alex	Stunt Coordinator	
1977	Niwena Ginna			
1978	Madhuwanthi		Stunt Coordinator	
1978	Saara			
1978	Tikira	Bandu		
1978	Apsara			
1978	Kumara Kumariyo	Bandu	Stunt Coordinator	
1978	Anupama	Murdered shop owner		
1979	Sawudan Jema			
1979	Sugandhi	Bennet		
1979	Subhani			
1980	Seetha			
1982	Sandaa			
1982	Sudu Ayya			
1982	Miss Mallika		Stunt Coordinator	
1983	Hithath Hondai Wedath Hondai			
1985	Araliya Mal	Chandana's man		
1985	Channai Kello Dennai			
1985	Karadiya Wallalla			
1987	Podi Vijay			
1989	Badulu Kochchiya			
1989	Obata Rahasak Kiyannam			
1989	Randenigala Sinhaya	Lando		
1990	Yukthiyata Wada	Kuruppu		
1992	Rumathiyay Neethiyay			
1992	Sathya			
1994	150 Mulleriyawa	Funeral walker		
1995	Mama Baya Na Shyama			
1995	Hitha Honda Surayo			
