= Swarna Kahawita =

Sri Lankan film actress (1946–2022)

Swarna Kahawita ස්වර්ණා කහවිට
- Born: Kahawitage Dona Leena Swarnalatha; 1 November 1946; Colombo, British Ceylon
- Died: 23 May 2022 (aged 75); Colombo, Sri Lanka
- Education: Kotahena Central College; Buddhist Ladies' College
- Occupation: Actress
- Years active: 1967–1981
- Parents: Alfred Perera (father); Adeline Winifried Abeysekera (mother)
- Relatives: Ariyaratne Kahawita (brother); Mallika de Silva (sister-in-law)

Kahawitage Dona Leena Swarnalatha (ස්වර්ණා කහවිට; 1 November 1946 – 23 May 2022), popularly known as Swarna Kahawita, was an actress in Sri Lankan cinema. One of the most popular film actresses in the 1960s and 1970s of Sinhala cinema, Kahawita made award-winning appearances in the films such as Binaramalee, Onna Mame Kella Panapi and Suraya Surayamai.

== Personal life ==
Swarna Kahawita was born on 1 November 1946 in Kotahena, Colombo, British Ceylon as the youngest of the family. Her father Alfred Perera worked in the printing department of Lake House. Later he continued his business in the lands in Padukka. Her mother Adeline Winifried Abeysekera was a housewife. Swarna completed her education from Kotahena Central College (then Nilveediya College) and Buddhist Ladies' College. Due to the strong reluctance of her parents, she had to end the romantic relationship, who later became a doctor. After that, she lived without a marriage. A film director proposed marriage to Swarna. After her refusal, he attempted suicide by jumping down a hill at a film set, but was rescued. After the death of her parents, she sold the house in Kotahena and moved to the super luxury apartment complex in Maligawatte.

She had two elder sisters: Sriyalatha Piyaseeli, Chandralatha; and two elder brothers: Bernard Somapala, Ariyaratne Kahawita. Her elder brother Ariyaratne Kahawita was also a film journalist. Kahawitage Don Ariyaratne Perera was born on 8 May 1933 in Kotahena. He was educated at Gunananda College, Kotahena, and then entered Carey College, Colombo. Ariyaratne was married to Mallika de Silva, who was a popular radio singer that sang the songs "Hinehewi Bonikka", "Bakamuno Hum Hum" and "Thaniwama Ai Me Ude". They married on 12 June 1963 and had a daughter, Apsara; and a son, Chandima Nayanajith. He died on 22 July 1994, suffering from diabetes.

Swarna died on 23 May 2022 at the age of 75 after a brief illness. Her body was laid at Jayaratne parlor in Borella for public respect. Her last rites were held at Kanatte Cemetery on 24 May 2022 at 4.30 pm.

== Career ==
Swarna had the ability to sing songs from an early age where she sang poems at the School Literary Association and at various concerts. Because of that innate ability, one of her uncles took her to Karunaratne Abeysekera's radio program Lama Pitiya. She passed the voice test and joined the Lama Pitiya. But she lost the opportunity after the parents protested, fearing that her education would be disrupted.

She entered acting amid the strong reluctance of her parents. Even though her brother was involved in cinema, he refused Swarna to choose cinema as a profession. In 1967, she made her acting debut in the 16 mm film Rahas Dupatha directed by Irvin Jayamanne with a child role at the age of 13. In the same year, she had the opportunity to act in a film, Dharma Sri Caldera's film Rana Giraw. Then she got the opportunity to have a lead role because of a reply letter she had placed to the actress' selection advertisement for the film Binaramalee based on popular radio series Muwan Palessa mentioned in the Sarasaviya newspaper. She made her cinema debut in the film Binaramalee with the title role in 1969 directed by Mudalinayake Somaratne. The film was a turning point in her cinema career where she later won the Sarasaviya Award for the Best Actress at the 7th Sarasaviya Awards for her role.

At the peak of her popularity, she decided to quit acting and move to Japan in 1980 as a tourist because of a childhood passion. In Japan, she got the opportunity to work in an advertising company until 1985. However, she had to return to Sri Lanka due to her mother becoming paralyzed. When she first came to Sri Lanka she received invitations for teledramas but all of them were lost.

Apart from that she later had lead and supportive roles in the films such as; Onna Mame Kella Panapi, Rana Giraw, Pujithayo, Ran Onchilla, Abhirahasa, Hondai Narakai, Cyril Malli, Suraya Surayamai, Harima Badu Thunak, Unnath Dahai Malath Dahai, and Lassana Dawasak. During her cinema career which spanned fourteen years, she mostly had lead roles opposite to Vijaya Kumaratunga. Her final cinema appearance came in the 1981 film Dayabara Nilu directed by Kandapola Kumaratunga. Although she was invited to act in the film Hingana Kolla, she dropped out of acting due to the loss of her role as 'Lama Hami', which she preferred to play. Apart from feature films, she also acted in the documentary films such as, Sahan Eliya, Raththaran and Thangame Thangam. In the 2010s, she became very popular with the biscuit advertisement as "Chandra Kumara's mother".

In 2019, she was awarded an honorary award at the 19th Presidential Awards held at the Nelum Pokuna Theatre. In 2021, she was honored with lifetime achievement award during the ceremony held for 21 artists who made an invaluable contribution to Sinhala cinema in the early decades of Sinhala Cinema.

== Filmography ==
Year	Film	Role	Ref.
1967	Rahas Dupatha	Rani	
1967	Rena Giraw	Arachchi Putha's girlfriend	
1969	Binaramalee	Binaramalee	
1971	Poojithayo	Indrani Batuwantalawa	
1971	Ran Onchilla	Rekha	
1971	Abhirahasa	Sunila 'Malini'	
1973	Hondai Narakai		
1974	Onna Babo Billo Enawa	Asha	
1975	Cyril Malli		
1975	Suraya Surayamai	Nita	
1975	Lassana Dawasak	Nilanthi	
1976	Harima Badu Thunak	Gina 'Alice'	
1976	Unnath Dahai Malath Dahai		
1976	Onna Mame Kella Panapi		
1977	Hariyanakota Ohma Thamai		
1977	Niwena Ginna		
1978	Sasara	Nanda	
1981	Dayabara Nilu	Janaki	
