= Sujeewa =

Sujeewa is a given name. Notable people with the name include:

- Sujeewa Kamalasuriya (1965–2004), Sri Lankan cricketer
- Sujeewa Priyalal (born 1973), Sri Lankan actor
- Sujeewa Senasinghe (born 1971), Sri Lankan lawyer
- Sujeewa de Silva (born 1979), Sri Lankan cricketer
- Sujeewa Senarath Yapa (born 1968), Sri Lanka Army general
