= Baptist Fernando =

Sri Lankan actor and producer

Baptist Fernando බැප්ටිස්ට් ප්‍රනාන්දු
- Born: Warnakulasuriya Maha Lekumge John Baptist Fernando; 9 July 1933; Wennappuwa, Sri Lanka
- Died: 1 February 2017 (aged 83); Ragama, Sri Lanka
- Resting place: Kanatte Cemetery
- Education: Joseph Vaz College
- Occupations: Actor, producer, director
- Years active: 1955–2001

Warnakulasuriya Maha Lekumge John Baptist Fernando (born 9 June 1933 – died 1 February 2017 as බැප්ටිස්ට් ප්‍රනාන්දු), known popularly as Baptist Fernando, was an actor and producer in Sri Lankan cinema. One of the earliest pillars in Sri Lankan film history, he is best known for playing villains during his more than four-decade long career.

== Personal life ==
Fernando was born on 9 June 1933 in Collin Jadiya, Wennappuwa as the eldest of the family. His father's name was Eugene Fernando and mother's name was Winifreda Fernando. He had three younger sisters and two younger brothers. He completed education from Joseph Vaz College, Wennappuwa. He was very good at sports, particularly wrestling, where he practiced wrestling with the then heavyweight champion, Basil Rodrigo. His grandson, Chris Wijewardana, is also an actor who appeared in the television serials Pani Kurullo, Amaliya and the film Apata Sadunu Ape Lokaya.

In 1960 he married Thiris Fernando. The couple had two daughters – Shamila Priyadarshani, Dulari Fernando and on son – Shammi Fernando. His son Shammi was also an actor. In the film Angulimala, which was directed by his father, Shammi played the main role as "Ahinsaka". Then he acted in few films such as Raja Kello, Cheriyo Darling, Alu Yata Gini and Ane Master. Daughter Shamila acted in the teledrama Mangala Seenu. His wife Thiris died in 1986.

He died at the age of 83 on 1 February 2017 while receiving treatments at Ragama hospital. His funeral took place on 3 February 2017 at Borella Cemetery.

== Career ==
One of his schoolmates, S.A. Fernando, took some photographs of Baptist during a church feast. He posted these photos to popular filmmaker B. A. W. Jayamanne. Jayamanne invited Baptist for a screen test at Jayamanne's house "Jaya Ruk Sevana". He was selected for the main antagonist in the 1955 film Perakadoru Bena directed by A.B. Raja. He had to finish senior level class in College to fly India for the shooting. He played two roles in the film – a police officer and villain's henchman.

In 1959, Baptist acted in the film Purusha Rathnaya along with Prem Jayanth. They sang the popular song Aiyata Me Raja Ge Malli Hadala. He continued to receive many villain roles in the following years, including Sithaka Mahima, Ohoma Hondada, Satha Panaha, Sahanaya and Kawuda Raja. In many films, Baptist acted as the villain opposite to Gamini Fonseka who played the protagonist role. He studied cinema in India and met the cinematographer S. Anandan. After he returned to Sri Lanka, Baptist was involved in acting in films along with Anandan. It was only after this that he became a character actor.

In 1972, he co-produced the film Sahanaya with Prem Jayanth under the banner "Seven Arts". Then he produced the film Duppathage Hithawatha and played as the protagonist for the first time. After the film became a blockbuster of that year, Baptist continued to produce many films such as Tikira, Eka diga Kathawak, Namal Renu and Sudu Ayya. The film Eka diga Kathawak was dubbed in Tamil as Oru Thalei Kadal and screened in Jaffna as well. He was known not to sign any agreements with film crew as he was always fluent with paying money on time. In the film Tikira, he introduced back and forth somersault actions to Sinhala cinema. The film was a blockbuster hit as well. It was also Baptist's best-loved film role.

In 1998, he produced and directed the film Angulimala. Then in 1991, he produced the film Raja Kello with Sithara Priyadharshani. Overall he produced 7 films – Sahanaya, Duppathage Hithawatha, Tikira, Eka diga Kathawak, Sudu Ayya, Namal Renu and Angulimala.

Apart from cinema, Baptist also worked as the treasurer of "Nalu Nili Sangamaya".

== Filmography ==
Year	Film	Role	Ref.
1955	Perakadoru Bena	Dual role	
1959	Avishwasaya	Gunaratne	
1959	Purusha Rathnaya	Sugatha Pala	
1963	Suneela		
1964	Sithaka Mahima		
1965	Sepatha Soya	Winnie	
1965	Satha Panaha	Club Manager	
1966	Athulweema Thahanam		
1966	Seegiri Kashyapa	Rama Datva	
1966	Seyawak Pasupasa		
1967	Sarana		
1969	Oba Nathinam		
1970	Ohoma Hondada		
1971	Sahanaya	Baby Mahathaya	
1973	Thushara	Wijesinghe	
1973	Hondata Hondai	Duncan	
1974	Duppathage Hithawatha	Ananda	
1975	Cyril Malli		
1976	Pradeepe Ma Wewa		
1976	Kawuda Raja	Kapila	
1977	Aege Adara Kathawa	Manager	
1977	Wanagatha Kella		
1977	Deviyani Oba Kohida?	Joseph	
1977	Chin Chin Nona		
1978	Mage Ran Putha		
1978	Tikira	Ananda 'Tikira'	
1978	Sally		
1979	Subhani		
1979	Raja Kollo	Dharme	
1982	Sudu Ayya	Ananda	
1982	Eka Diga Kathawak		
1984	Namal Renu		
1987	Ahinsa	Party guest	
1988	Angulimala		
1989	Mamai Raja	Inspector father	
1989	Shakthiya Oba Amme	Police Chief	
1990	Walawwe Hamu		
1990	Christhu Charithaya	Annas	
1991	Raja Kello		
1994	Shakthi		
1996	Sihina Wimane Kumariya	Tipster Victor	
1996	Sebe Mithura		
1996	Cheriyo Darling	Mr. Fernando	
2008	Adara Meena		
