= B. S. Perera =

Sri Lankan actor, director, singer and comedian

B. S. Perera බී. එස්. පෙරේරා
- Born: Balasuriyage Steven Perera; 31 March 1924; Colombo, Sri Lanka
- Died: 24 July 1982 (aged 58); Chilaw, Puttalam
- Education: Sri Sangaraja Central College, Colombo 10
- Occupations: Actor, comedian, director, Singer
- Years active: 1960–1982

Balasuriyage Steven Perera (31 March 1924 – 24 June 1982 as බී. එස්. පෙරේරා) [Sinhala]), popularly known as B. S. Perera, was an actor in Sri Lankan cinema and theater as well as a director and singer. One of the earliest pillars and popular comedy artists ever in Sri Lankan film history, Perera had a career spanned about three decades. He holds the record for the highest number of films acted by a Sri Lankan well over 180 films.

== Personal life ==
Perera was born on 31 March 1924 in Colombo. His father was Balasuriyage Adwin Perera. He was a talented artist in the Tower Hall era. He received his primary education at Maligakanda Government School, Colombo (currently known as Mahinda Maha Vidyalaya, Maligakanda) and later studied at Sangaraja Vidyalaya, Maradana (currently known as Sri Sangaraja Central College, Colombo 10). In 1939, Perera joined the Army and joined the Colombo Municipal Council at the end of World War II.

Before entering cinema, Perera worked as a Tram car driver. Due to an accident he lost part of the vision. Although he underwent eye surgery, he suffered a tear in his eye causing a strabismus condition. After the accident, he served as a trolley bus inspector.

Perera was married to B.A.D. Gnanawathi. The couple had five daughters – elder Sriyani, younger Sriyani, Brinda, Rajathi, Princy – and two sons – Sunil Wesley and Ravindra. Sunil Wesley was a professional commercial artist and singer. Second son Ravindra has acted in few films such as Yakadaya and Duppathage Hithawatha and then retired from the Chilaw Railway Department.

Perera died on 24 June 1982 in Chilaw after a brief illness at the age of 58.

== Career ==
From the little age, he had performed in Tower Hall stage dramas. He acted as "Mohottala" in the stage play Sri Wickrama, which was his only Tower Hall acting. During his work as a tram car driver, he produced the stage play Nikan Awa to donate to the Urban Council Funeral Association. Then he produced the plays Samadaththara, Lankapura and Saliya Ashokamala. Strabismus condition made the fortune of becoming a film actor. One of his friends, C.M. Rupasinghe introduced Perera to popular film producer S. Sivanandan. At that time, Sivanandan was the assistant director in film Dheewarayo.

He acted in an English film before enter to Sinhala cinema. His first Sinhala film was Roddy Kella directed by Sirisena Wimalaweera. However, due to the sudden death of Wimalaweera, the film shooting stopped. His first screened film appearance came through 1964 blockbuster film Dheewarayo in a minor role as a singer. The most memorable character played by Perera was as a patient in the film Senasuma Kothanada. His comic roles were extremely popular, some of them include, Chandiya, Thushara, Hari Pudumai, Hondata Hondai, Mahadena Muththa and Ara Soyza. He also acted in the Sri Lankan Tamil film Mamiyar Veedu.

In 1955, he worked as the music director in the film Perakadoru Bena directed by A.B. Raja. In 1974, he directed and produced the film Rodi Gama. In 1974, he was awarded with Deepashika Award for acting most number of Sinhala films. He emerged from the comic strip and acted as a character actor in few films such as Subhani, Bandura Mal, Rana Derana and Ridee Thella.

After his death in 1982, twenty eight films were screened as posthumous releases.

== Filmography ==
=== As actor ===
Year	Film	Role	Ref.
1964	Dheewarayo		
1965	Chandiya	Rifai Nana	
1965	Sathutai Kandului		
1965	Sudo Sudu	Cow owner	
1965	Yata Giya Dawasa		
1965	Saaravita	Muslim Mudalali	
1965	Allapu Gedara	Sepalika's father	
1965	Satha Panaha	Mahaththaya 'Sir'	
1965	Landaka Mahima		
1966	Segawena Sewanella		
1966	Mahadena Muththa	Puwak Badilla	
1966	Senasuma Kothanada	Patient	
1966	Maha Ra Hamuwu Sthriya		
1966	Athulweema Thahanam		
1966	Kapatikama	Film director	
1966	Oba Dutu Da		
1966	Sanda Naga Eddi		
1966	Senasili Suwaya	Nyanawardana	
1966	Layata Laya		
1967	Sorungeth Soru		
1967	Pipena Kumudu		
1967	Sarana		
1967	Vasanthi		
1967	Okkoma Hari		
1967	Hitha Giya Thena		
1967	Sura Chauraya		
1967	Rena Giraw		
1968	Pini Bindu		
1968	London Hamu		
1968	Bicycle Hora		
1968	Amathikama		
1968	Ruhunu Kumari		
1968	Dehadaka Duka	Saldadue	
1968	Ataweni Pudumaya		
1969	Oba Nathinam		
1969	Kohomada Wade		
1969	Pickpocket	Mr. Sinclair	
1969	Preweshamwanna	Kokiyo 'Bandaa Aiyya'	
1969	Pancha		
1970	Athma Pooja		
1970	Thevatha		
1970	Penawa Neda		
1970	Ohoma Hondada		
1971	Kathuru Muwath	Chasing constable	
1971	Seeye Nottuwa		
1972	Sujeewa		
1972	Singapore Charlie		
1972	Ada Mehemai	Sira's cousin	
1972	Lokuma Hinawa	Patient	
1972	Ihatha Athmaya	Master	
1973	Suhada Pethuma		
1973	Aparadhaya Ha Danduwama		
1973	Thushara	Wilson	
1973	Gopalu Handa		
1973	Sinawai Inawai		
1973	Sunethra	Job Seeker	
1973	Dahakin Ekek	Professor	
1973	Hondata Hondai	Medal carrier	
1974	Duleeka		
1974	Dinum Kanuwa		
1974	Surekha		
1974	Onna Babo Billo Enawa	Gonsali	
1974	Susee	Wedding singer	
1974	Sagarika		
1974	Duppathage Hithawatha	Remy	
1974	Wasthuwa		
1974	Jeewana Ganga		
1974	Rodi Gama	Purohitha Mahesh	
1975	Hitha Honda Minihek	Sunny	
1975	Obai Mamai	Cook Simon	
1975	Kaliyuga Kale		
1975	Raththaran Amma	Potas	
1975	Sukiri Kella	Sunimal	
1975	Cyril Malli		
1975	Amaraneeya Adare		
1975	Kokilayo		
1975	Suraya Surayamai	Landlord	
1975	Jeewana Geethaya		
1975	Lassana Dawasak	Kurulosuwa	
1975	Sadhana		
1976	Pradeepe Ma Wewa		
1976	Nayana		
1976	Kawuda Raja	Paddikkama	
1976	Wasana	Dobie 'Sima'	
1976	Vanarayo		
1976	Asha		
1976	Onna Mame Kella Panapi		
1976	Deviyange Theenduwa	Sergeant	
1976	Adarei Man Adarei		
1976	Ran Thilaka		
1977	Sakunthala		
1977	Maruwa Samaga Wase		
1977	Sudu Paraviyo	Ango wooer	
1977	Sri Madara		
1977	Hariyanakota Ohoma Thamai		
1977	Chin Chin Nona		
1977	Yali Ipade		
1977	Sajaa		
1977	Chandi Putha		
1977	Aege Adara Kathawa		
1977	Wanagatha Kella		
1978	Sithaka Suwanda		
1978	Chandi Shyama		
1978	Mage Ran Putha		
1978	Madhuwanthi	Thompson	
1978	Siripathula		
1978	Saara		
1978	Kundalakeshi	Sathruka's man	
1978	Tikira	Mahathaya	
1978	Janaka Saha Manju		
1978	Sally		
1978	Apsara		
1978	Deepanjali		
1978	Veera Puran Appu		
1978	Sandawata Rantharu		
1979	Samanmali		
1979	Jeewana Kandulu		
1979	Amal Biso		
1979	Raja Kollo	Pala's employee	
1979	Ran Kurullo		
1979	Anusha	Siripala	
1979	Akke Mata Awasara	Servant	
1979	Sugandhi	Vadivel	
1979	Sawudan Jema		
1979	Subhani		
1979	Hingana Kolla		
1979	Nuwan Renu	Hindu procession leader	
1979	Hari Pudumai	Bokudiras	
1980	Silva		
1980	Anuhasa		
1980	Seetha		
1980	Adara Rathne	Principal	
1980	Doctor Susantha		
1980	Raja Dawasak		
1980	Mage Amma		
1980	Sabeetha	Martin	
1980	Api Dedena		
1981	Sathkulu Pawwa	Perera 'C. C.'	
1981	Sudda	Mas Thambi	
1981	Kolamkarayo		
1981	Senasuma		
1981	Amme Mata Samawenna	Head Kanakara	
1981	Ridee Thella	Kattadiya	
1981	Bandura Mal		
1981	Geethika		
1981	Dayabara Nilu	Pappa	
1981	Hondama Naluwa		
1981	Jeewanthi		
1982	Bicycley	Nicholas	
1982	Sudu Ayya	Surabiel	
1982	Pethi Gomara	Jokino's brother-in-law	
1982	Eka Diga Kathawak		
1982	Rahasak Nathi Rahasak		
1982	Sitharaa		
1982	Thakkita Tharikita		
1982	Chathu Madhura	Piyadasa	
1982	Kadawunu Poronduwa remake	Mudalali	
1983	Ran Mini Muthu		
1983	Sumithuro	Master	
1983	Karate Joe		
1983	Loku Thaththa		
1983	Mal Madhu		
1983	Rathu Makara	Sirisena	
1983	Hithath Hondai Wedath Hondai		
1983	Chuttey	Jamis	
1983	Chandi Siriya		
1984	Kekille Rajjuruwo	Polbe Muna	
1984	Ara Soyza	Kiridena 'Uncle'	
1984	Kiri Kawadi	Jussey	
1984	Mala Giravi		
1984	Welle Thanu Maliga		
1984	Bambara Patikki		
1984	Kokila		
1984	Hithawathiya	Guard	
1984	Namal Renu		
1984	Rana Derana		
1984	Sahodariyakage Kathawa		
1984	Ranmalige Wasanawa		
1984	Muthu Manike		
1984	Birinda		
1985	Puthuni Mata Samawenna		
1985	Adarayaka Mahima	Kamal	
1985	Chalitha Rangali		
1986	Mal Warusa	Premapala	
1986	Gimhane Gee Naade	Villager	
