= List of Sri Lankan films of the 1990s =

Films produced in Sri Lanka in the 1990s.

== 1990 ==
Title	Director	Cast	Genre	Notes
Dase Mal Pipila	Wilfred Silva	Vijaya Kumaratunga, Sriyani Amarasena, Sanath Gunathilake, Sabeetha Perera, Agra Sajivani, Cletus Mendis, Ranjan Ramanayake	Drama	Released on 11 February. It is adapted from Hindi movie Rishta Kagaz Ka
Thanha Asha	Ashoka Nishshanka; Cyril Weerasinha	Vijaya Kumaratunga, Jeevan Kumaratunga, Sabeetha Perera, Robin Fernando, Rex Kodippili, Leena de Silva	Drama	Released on 23 March. It is adapted from Hindi movie Yaadon Ki Baaraat
Yukthiyata Weda	Sunil Soma Peiris	Jeevan Kumaratunga, Anoja Weerasinghe, Nihal Silva, Cletus Mendis, Sonia Disa, Mervyn Jayathunga, Lionel Deraniyagala	Action, Drama	Released on 6 April.
Jayashakthi	Kusum Chandra Gamage	Shashi Wijendra, Gothami Pathiraja, Malini Fonseka, Lucky Dias, Lionel Deraniyagala, Ananda Wickramage, Wilson Karu, Lilian Edirisinghe	Action, Drama	Released on 6 April.
Dedunnen Samanaliyak	Yasapalitha Nanayakkara	Ajith Jinadasa, Dilhani Ekanayake, Freddie Silva, Nihal Silva, Cletus Mendis, Mervyn Jayathunga, Bandu Samarasinghe, Chitra Wakishta	Comedy, Drama	Released on 14 April.
Weera Udara	Shirely P. Wijerathna	Vijaya Kumaratunga, Malini Fonseka, Cletus Mendis, Jeevan Kumaratunga, Anoja Weerasinghe, Mervyn Jayathunga, Ranjan Ramanayake, Maureen Charuni	Action, Drama	Released on 4 May.
Sambudhu Mahima	Vasantha Kuruppu	Maureen Charuni, Freddie Silva, Ananda Wickramage, Melani Asoka, Piyadasa Wijekoon, Lilian Edirisinghe, Tennyson Cooray	Drama religious	Released on 18 May.
Hondin Nethnam Narakin	V. Siwadasan; Thilak Wehalla	Sanath Gunathilake, Nadeeka Gunasekara, Nihal Silva, Mervyn Jayathunga, Tissa Wijesurendra, Sunil Hettiarachchi, Wilson Karu	Action, Drama	Released on 15 June.
Saharawe Sihinaya	H. D. Premaratne	Vijaya Kumaratunga, Ravindra Randeniya, Jeevan Kumaratunga, Vasanthi Chathurani, Chandani Seneviratne, Sanoja Bibile	Drama	Released on 22 June.
Walavuve Hamu	Gamini Nawarathna	Baptist Fernando, Agra Sajivani, Shammi Fernando, Samantha Epasinghe, Gemunu Wijesuriya, Nimal Pallewatta, Don Sirisena, D.R. Nanayakkara, Freddie Silva, Manel Wanaguru	Adult Drama	Released on 22 June.
Pem Raja Dahana	Dayananda Jayawardena	Sanath Gunathilake, Amarasiri Kalansooriya, Jeevan Kumaratunga, Menik Kurukulasooriya, Nadeeka Gunasekara, Anoja Weerasinghe, Jayasekara Aponso, Mervyn Jayathunga	Drama	Released on 17 July.
Madhu Sihina	Daya Wimalaweera	Vijaya Kumaratunga, Sanath Gunathilake, Jeevan Kumaratunga, Vasanthi Chathurani, Bandu Samarasinghe, Roy de Silva, Sumana Amarasinghe, Sriyani Amarasena	Drama	Released on 3 August.
Jaya Kothanada	Somarathna Ramanayaka	Ranjan Ramanayake, Sanoja Bibile, Maureen Charuni, Stanley Warnakula, Sunil Hettiarachchi, Bandu Samarasinghe, Hugo Fernando, Freddie Silva	Action Drama	Released on 3 August.
Palama Yata	H. D. Premaratne	Geetha Kumarasinghe, Sanath Gunathilake, Raazi Anwar, Joe Abeywickrama, Mervyn Jayathunga, H. A. Perera, Cyril Wickramage	Adult Drama	Released on 31 August.
Chandi Raja	Sunil Soma Peiris	Jeevan Kumaratunga, Sabeetha Perera, Mervyn Jayathunga, Ranjan Ramanayake, Sunil Hettiarachchi, Lionel Deraniyagala, Sonia Disa	Action Drama	Released on 14 September.
Christhu Charithaya	Sunil Ariyaratne	Vijaya Kumaratunga, Menik Kurukulasooriya, Rex Kodippili, Sathischandra Edirisinghe, Neil Alles, Nathali Anne Greet, Prasanna Wickramasinghe	Religious Drama	Released on 9 October.
Hoda Hoda Sellam	Dinash Priyasad	Malini Fonseka, Jeevan Kumaratunga, Lucky Dias, Mervyn Jayathunga, Nihal Silva, Tennyson Cooray, Wilson Karu, Piyadasa Wijekoon	Action Drama	Released on 19 October.
Hitha Hoda Puthek	Roy de Silva	Jeevan Kumaratunga, Anoja Weerasinghe, Sumana Amarasinghe, Rex Kodippili, Freddie Silva, Nihal Silva, Tennyson Cooray, Bandu Samarasinghe	Action Drama	Released on 3 November.
Hima Gira	Vijaya Dharma Sri	Ravindra Randeniya, Vasanthi Chathurani, Ranjan Ramanayake, Jayalath Manoratne, Sampath Tennakoon, Wilson Karu, Asoka Peiris	Classic Drama	Released on 14 December.
Vana Bambara	Timothy Weerarathna	Shashi Wijendra, Menik Kurukulasooriya, Vasanthi Chathurani, Dilani Abeywardana, Berty Gunathilake, Sunil Hettiarachchi, Rex Kodippili	Drama	Released on 20 December.

== 1991 ==
Title	Director	Cast	Genre	Notes
Uthura Dakuna	Hemasiri Sellapperuma	Gamini Fonseka, Sanath Gunathilake, Sabeetha Perera, Vasanthi Chathurani, Herbert Amarawickrama, Piyadasa Wijekoon, Freddie Silva, Rex Kodippili, Shashi Wijendra	Action Drama	Released on 18 January.
Paraadeese	Dinesh Priyasad	Malini Fonseka, Lucky Dias, Kamal Addararachchi, Damayanthi Fonseka, Tennyson Cooray, Lilian Edirisinghe, Shanthi Lekha	Drama	Released on 28 January.
Weda Barinam Wedak Naha	Upali Priyarathna	Lal Weerasinghe, Dilhani Ekanayake, Priyankara Perera, Cletus Mendis, Wilson Karu, Nihal Silva, Teddy Vidyalankara, Wasantha Vittachchi	Action Drama	Released on 15 February.
Dolos Mahe Pahana	Nishantha De Alvis	Somy Rathnayake, Geetha Kumarasinghe, Damayanthi Fonseka, Amarasiri Kalansooriya, Indrajith Navinna, Denawaka Hamine, Wimal Halangoda	Drama	Released on 1 March.
Sihina Ahase Wasanthe	Yasapalitha Nanayakkara	Jeevan Kumaratunga, Shashi Wijendra, Anoja Weerasinghe, Veena Jayakody, Vincent Vaas, Wilson Karu, Freddie Silva, Aruna Shanthi	Drama	Released on 9 March. It is a remake of Kollywood film Kadhalikka Neramillai
Keli Madala	D. B. Nihalsinghe	H. A. Perera, Anoja Weerasinghe, Veena Jayakody, Jeevan Kumaratunga, Nilmini Tennakoon, Dilani Abeywardana, Ruby de Mel	Classic Drama	Released on 5 April.
Obata Pamanai Adare	S. V. Sarathchandra; Anton Kingsley	Shashi Wijendra, Sabeetha Perera, Roy de Silva, Freddie Silva, Samanthi Lanerolle, Mark Samson, Gothami Pathiraja	Action comedy	Released on 19 April.
Hithata Dukak Nathi Miniha	Dinesh Priyasad	Malini Fonseka, Somy Rathnayake, Anoja Weerasinghe, Shashi Wijendra, Wimal Kumara de Costa, Sandhya Kumari, Mervyn Jayathunga, Wilson Karu	Action Drama	Released on 3 May.
Asai Bayai	Hemasiri Sellapperuma	Shashi Wijendra, Lal Weerasinghe, Dilhani Ekanayake, Maureen Charuni, Berty Gunathilake, Wilson Karu, Lal Weerasinghe, Tennyson Cooray	Action comedy	Released on 24 May.
Raja Kello	Shirley P. Wijerathna	Baptist Fernando, Malini Fonseka, Lucky Dias, Shammi Fernando, Mervyn Jayathunga, Freddie Silva, Sonia Disa, Sarath Silva	Action Drama	Released on 24 May.
Raja Sellam	Sunil Soma Peiris	Jeevan Kumaratunga, Vasanthi Chathurani, Mervyn Jayathunga, Rex Kodippili, Sonia Dissanayake, Nihal Silva, Freddie Silva, Lilian Edirisinghe, Piyadasa Wijekoon	Action Drama	Released on 21 June.
Madu Samaya	K. A. Wijerathna	Vijaya Kumaratunga, Malini Fonseka, Lucky Dias, Neil Alles, Samanthi Lanerolle, Rathna Sumanapala	Drama	Released on 28 June.
Love In Bangkok	Hemasiri Sellapperuma	Sanath Gunathilake, Sabeetha Perera, Shashi Wijendra, Dilhani Ekanayake, Ranjan Ramanayake, Freddie Silva, Manel Chandralatha, Dilani Abeywardana	Action comedy	Released on 19 July.
Esala Sanda	Lional Panduwawela	Jeevan Kumaratunga, Anoja Weerasinghe, Sonia Dissanayake, Cletus Mendis, Nihal Silva, Tennyson Cooray, Mervyn Jayathunga	Action comedy	Released on 19 July.
Salambak Handai	Hemasiri Sellapperuma	Shashi Wijendra, Geetha Kumarasinghe, Thilak Kumara Rathnayake, Mark Samson, Rex Kodippili, Wilson Karu, Menik Kurukulasuriya	Action drama	Released on 2 August.
Ran Hadawatha	Sunil Soma Peiris	Jeevan Kumaratunga, Nadeeka Gunasekara, Anoja Weerasinghe, Ranjan Ramanayake, Nihal Silva, Aruna Shanthi, Cletus Mendis	Drama	Released on 19 July.
Golu Muhude Kunatuva	Shelton Payagala	Joe Abeywickrama, Sriyani Amarasena, Lakshman Arachchige, Ravindra Randeniya, Raja Sumanapala, Daya Alwis, Sirimathi Rasadari, Rathna Sumanapala, Denawaka Hamine	Drama	Released on 20 September.
Cheriyo Doctor	Roy de Silva	Joe Abeywickrama, Sanath Gunathilake, Sabeetha Perera, Freddie Silva, Nihal Silva, Shashi Wijendra, Nadeeka Gunasekara, Bandu Samarasinghe, Tennyson Cooray	Comedy Action	Released on October 10.
Alibaba Saha Horu 40	N. Wimalasena	Robin Fernando, Farina Lai, Sandhya Kumari, Asoka Peiris, Freddie Silva, Manel Chandralatha, Samanthi Lanerolle, Don Sirisena	Action drama	Released on 11 October.
Dhanaya	Ananda Wickramasinha	Sanath Gunathilake, Dilhani Ekanayake, Freddie Silva, Nihal Silva, Ananda Wickramage, Wilson Karunaratne, Cletus Mendis	Action drama	Released on 1 November.
Sthree	Malini Fonseka	Malini Fonseka, Chandani Seneviratne, Joe Abeywickrama, Hemasiri Liyanage, Jayalath Manoratne, Cyril Wickramage, Sunil Hettiarachchi	Drama	Released on 15 November.
Suwadena Suwandak	Milton Jayawardena	Lucky Dias, Malini Fonseka, Veena Jayakody, Ruby de Mel, Manel Chandralatha, Ruwan Srilal, Piyadasa Wijekoon, Elson Divithuragama, Wimal Kumara de Costa	Drama, Comedy	Released on 29 November.
Bambara Kalape	Sena Samarasinghe	Jeevan Kumaratunga, Sabeetha Perera, Cletus Mendis, Bandu Samarasinghe, Freddie Silva, Tennyson Cooray, Sriyani Amarasena, Lionel Deraniyagala, Herbie Seneviratne	Action drama	Released on 6 December.
Ma Obe Hithawatha	Lional Panduwawela	Jeevan Kumaratunga, Anoja Weerasinghe, Ranjan Ramanayake, Dilani Abeywardana	Drama	Released on 27 December.

== 1992 ==
Title	Director	Cast	Genre	Notes
Ranabime Weeraya	Ranjith Siriwardhana	Jeevan Kumaratunga, Anoja Weerasinghe, Dilani Abeywardana, Mark Samson, Freddie Silva, Tennyson Cooray, Sonia Disa	Action Drama	Released on 10 January.
Sisila Gini Gani	Prasanna Vithanage	Sanath Gunathilake, Sabeetha Perera, Tony Ranasinghe, Veena Jayakody, Chandani Seneviratne Dilani Abeywardana,	Drama	Released on 17 January.
Jaya Sri Wey Kumariya	Yasapalitha Nanayakkara	Ajith Jinadasa, Dilhani Ekanayake, Freddie Silva, Roy de Silva, Bandu Samarasinghe, Mervyn Jayathunga, Mabel Blythe, Roy de Silva	Drama	Released on 24 January.
Salli Thibunata Madi	W. Ranjith Perera	Ranjan Ramanayake, Maureen Charuni, Vincent Vaas, Miyuri Samarasinghe, Wimal Kumara de Costa, Lilian Edirisinghe, Susila Kuragama	Drama	Released on 21 February.
Raja Daruwo	Daya Wimalaweera	Anoja Weerasinghe, Sanath Gunathilake, Shashi Wijendra, Sabeetha Perera, Jeevan Kumaratunga, Bandu Samarasinghe, Cletus Mendis	Action Drama	Released on 6 March.
Bajar Eke Chandiya	Hemasiri Sellapperuma	Sabeetha Perera, Mervyn Jayathunga, Freddie Silva, Manel Chandralatha, Chandra Kaluarachchi, Bandula Disanayake, Sunil Hettiarachchi	Action Comedy	Released on 14 March.
Viaru Miniha	Sugath Samarakoon	Sugath Samarakoon, Gothami Pathiraja, Felix Premawardhana, Kamal Addararachchi, Dharma Sri Munasinghe, Mark Samson, Rathnawali Kekunawela, Denawaka Hamine	Drama	Released on 20 March.
Sakwithi Raja	Sunil Soma Peiris	Jeevan Kumaratunga, Sabeetha Perera, Ranjan Ramanayake, Sonia Disa, Cletus Mendis, Freddie Silva, Piyadasa Wijekoon, Rathna Sumanapala	Action Comedy	Released on 27 March.
Sakkara Suththara	Hemasiri Sellapperuma	Sanath Gunathilake, Sabeetha Perera, Maureen Charuni, Hugo Fernando, Anthony C. Perera, Lilian Edirisinghe, Sirimathi Rasadari	Drama Comedy	Released on April.
Ahimi Dadaman	Dany W. Pathirana	Robin Fernando, Malini Fonseka, Rex Kodippili, Nihal Silva, Dharma Sri Munasinghe, Richard Weerakkodi, Lorance Rodrigo, Anushka Madiwaka	Adult Drama	Released on 15 May.
Malsara Doni	Hemasiri Sellapperuma	Sanath Gunathilake, Geetha Kumarasinghe, Mervyn Jayathunga, Dilhani Ekanayake, Wilson Karu, Freddie Silva, Lionel Deraniyagala	Action Comedy	Released on 12 June.
Chandi Rajina	Sunil Soma Peiris	Sabeetha Perera, Ranjan Ramanayake, Damith Fonseka, Dilhani Ekanayake, Sonia Disa, Mervyn Jayathunga, Cletus Mendis, Thalatha Gunasekara	Action Drama	Released on 19 June.
Sinha Raja	Hemasiri Sellapperuma	Shashi Wijendra, Vasanthi Chathurani, Cletus Mendis, Freddie Silva, Tennyson Cooray, Mervyn Jayathunga, Lionel Deraniyagala, Piyadasa Wijekoon	Action Comedy	Released on 26 June.
Kiyala Wadak Naa	Hemasiri Sellapperuma	Sanath Gunathilake, Vasanthi Chathurani, Cletus Mendis, Wilson Karu, Freddie Silva	Comedy Drama	Released on 7 July.
Umayanganaa	Ananda Fonseka	Joe Abeywickrama, Malini Fonseka, Damayanthi Fonseka, Somy Rathnayake, Miyuri Samarasinghe, Sriyantha Mendis, Priyankara Perera, Jayalath Manoratne	Drama	Released on 17 July.
Me Ware Mage	Lional Panduwawala	Jeevan Kumaratunga, Anoja Weerasinghe, Cletus Mendis, Dilani Abeywardana, Somy Rathnayake	Drama	Released on 17 August.
Okkoma Kanapita	Roy de Silva	Freddie Silva, Sumana Amarasinghe, Sabeetha Perera, Shashi Wijendra, Mark Samson, Lilian Edirisinghe, Mervyn Jayathunga, Manel Wanaguru	Action Comedy	Released on 4 September.
Rumathiyai Neethiyai	M. Arukkgoda	Malini Fonseka, Sanath Gunathilake, Jeevan Kumaratunga, Maureen Charuni, Rex Kodippili, Somy Rathnayake, Bandu Samarasinghe	Drama	Released on 25 September.
Suranimala	Yasapalitha Nanayakkara	Jeevan Kumaratunga, Dilhani Ekanayake, Roy de Silva, Mervyn Jayathunga, Vincent Vaas, Samanthi Lanerolle, Nilmini Tennakoon, Mark Samson	Action	Released on 9 October.
Oba Mata Vishvasai	V. Sivadasan; Thilak Wehalla	Jeevan Kumaratunga, Nadeeka Gunasekara, Menik Kurukulasooriya, Shashi Wijendra, Tissa Wijesurendra, Nihal Silva, Sonia Disa	Action drama	Released on 10 October.
Kulageya	H. D. Premaratne	Sriyani Amarasena, Lucky Dias, H. A. Perera, Vasanthi Chathurani, Douglas Ranasinghe, Sunil Hettiarachchi, Cyril Wickramage	Drama	Released on 12 October.
Sathya	Ranjith Siriwardane	Malini Fonseka, Lucky Dias, Priyankara Perera, Samantha Epasinghe, Lionel Deraniyagala, Freddie Silva, H. A. Perera, Bandu Samarasinghe, Mervyn Jayathunga	Action drama	Released on 13 November.
Muwanpalessey Kadira	Yasapalitha Nanayakkara	Rex Kodippili, Geetha Kumarasinghe, Jeevan Kumaratunga, Freddie Silva, Roy de Silva, Chitra Wakishta, Wilson Karu, Wimal Kumara de Costa	Action comedy	Released on 20 November.
Singhayangeth Singhaya	Sunil Soma Peiris	Sanath Gunathilake, Sabeetha Perera, Ranjan Ramanayake, Dilani Abeywardana, Rex Kodippili, Mervyn Jayathunga, Wilson Karu, Mark Samson	Action comedy	Released on 4 December.
Rajek Wage Puthek	Upali Piyarathne	Jeevan Kumaratunga, Sabeetha Perera, Cletus Mendis, Samantha Epasinghe, Mervyn Jayathunga, Freddie Silva, Nihal Silva, Ranjan Ramanayake	Action Drama	Released on 24 December.
Sayanaye Sihinaya	Anura Chandrasiri	Jeevan Kumaratunga, Maureen Charuni, Dilani Abeywardana, Neil Alles, Samantha Epasinghe, Jayasekara Aponsu, Anoma Kumuduni, Lakshman Arachchige	Adult 18+	Released on 25 December.

== 1993 ==
Title	Director	Cast	Genre	Notes
Chayaa	Daya Wimalaweera	Sanath Gunathilake, Sabeetha Perera, Nadeeka Gunasekara, Cletus Mendis, Mervyn Jayathunga, Bandu Samarasinghe, Joe Dambulagala	Romantic	Released on 14 January.
Gurugedara	Vijaya Dharma Shri	Ravindra Randeniya, Anoja Weerasinghe, Asoka Peiris, Jackson Anthony, Jagath Chamila, Rathna Sumanapala, Yashoda Wimaladharma, Hemasiri Liyanage	Drama thriller	Released on 19 February.
Surabidena	Chandrarathne Mapitigama	Ravindra Randeniya, Anoja Weerasinghe, Somy Rathnayake, Veena Jayakody, Manike Attanayake, Asoka Peiris, Hyacinth Wijeratne, Premasiri Kalpage	Drama Romance	Released on 26 February.
Sargent Nallathambi	Ananda Wickramasinghe	Nihal Silva, Gamini Fonseka, Palitha Silva, Vasanthi Chathurani, Somy Rathnayake, Wilson Karu, Mervyn Jayathunga	Comedy	Released on 26 February.
Sagara Thilina	M. H. Gafoor	Shashi Wijendra, Maureen Charuni, Sriyani Amarasena, Roy de Silva, Freddie Silva, Thalatha Gunasekara, Mark Samson, Thilak Ranatunga	Drama Romance	Released on 5 March.
Prathignyaa	Yasapalitha Nanayakkara	Lucky Dias, Dilhani Ekanayake, Rajiv Nanayakkara, Freddie Silva, Rathna Sumanapala, Roy de Silva, Sunil Hettiarachchi, Samanalee Fonseka	Drama	Released on 2 April.
Wali Sulanga	Nishantha Pradeep	Jeevan Kumaratunga, Anoja Weerasinghe, Somy Rathnayake, Manel Wanaguru, Cletus Mendis, Nilmini Tennakoon, Rex Kodippili, Dilani Abeywardana	Drama Thriller	Released on 9 April.
Sasara Sarisarana Thek Oba Mage	Ananada Wickramasinghe	Sanath Gunathilake, Sabeetha Perera, Vasanthi Chathurani, Freddie Silva, Cletus Mendis, Wilson Karu, Mervyn Jayathunga	Drama Romance	Released on 16 April.
Mawila Penewi Rupe Hade	Alerik Lionel Fernando	Ranjan Ramanayake, Dilhani Ekanayake, Damayanthi Fonseka, Sanoja Bibile, Mervyn Jayathunga, Dayananda Jayawardena, Freddie Silva	Drama Romance	Released on 21 May.
Chaya Maya	Yasapalitha Nanayakkara	Ajith Jinadasa, Dilhani Ekanayake, Rajiv Nanayakkara, Roy de Silva, Freddie Silva, Samanthi Lanerolle, Wimal Kumara de Costa, Sanoja Bibile	Romantic comedy	Released on 21 May.
Surayan Athara Weerayaa	Roy de Silva	Vijaya Kumaratunga, Sabeetha Perera, Lionel Deraniyagala, Cletus Mendis, Freddie Silva, Bandu Samarasinghe, Sanoja Bibile	Action comedy	Released on 28 May.
Come Or Go Chicago	Dinesh Priyadas	Jeevan Kumaratunga, Ranjan Ramanayake, Freddie Silva, Tennison Cooray, Sabeetha Perera, Mervyn Jayathunga, Roy de Silva	Action comedy	Released on 5 June.
Yasasa	Ananada Wickramasinghe	Harshana Nanayakkara, Sangeetha Weeraratne, Freddie Silva, Roy de Silva, Cletus Mendis, Veena Jayakody, Nadeeka Gunasekara	Action comedy	Released on 18 June.
Saptha Kanya	H. D. Premaratne	Kamal Addaraarachchi, Sangeetha Weeraratne, Tony Ranasinghe, Hemasiri Liyanage, Jayalath Manoratne, Suminda Sirisena, Manike Attanayake, Robin Fernando	Romantic Drama	Released on 16 July.
Jevan Malli	Roy de Silva	Jeevan Kumaratunga, Dilhani Ekanayake, Dilani Abeywardana, Roy de Silva, Cletus Mendis, Freddie Silva, Rex Kodippili, Ruby de Mel	Action Drama	Released on 16 July.
Bambasara Bisawi	Daya Wimalaweera	Sanath Gunathilake, Sabeetha Perera, Shashi Wijendra, Ajith Jinadasa, Tissa Wijesurendra, Thalatha Gunasekara, Kanthi Lanka, Bandu Samarasinghe	Drama Romance	Released on 3 September.
Thrishulaya	Lalith Gunawardhana	Jeevan Kumaratunga, Ranjan Ramanayake, Somy Rathnayake, Maureen Charuni, Srinath Maldeniya, Sumith Mudannayake, Sujani Menaka	Drama Romance	Released on 10 September.
Sandarekha	Hemasiri Sellapperuma	Ranjan Ramanayake, Dilhani Ekanayake, Freddie Silva, Kamal Addaraarachchi, Manel Chandralatha, Mervyn Jayathunga, Wilson Karu, Geetha Kanthi Jayakody	Romantic Comedy	Released on 10 September.
Nelum Saha Samanmali	Chandrarathne Mapitigama	Ananda Jayaratne, Sanath Gunathilake, Geetha Kumarasinghe, Tissa Wijesurendra, Somy Rathnayake, Iranganie Serasinghe, Joe Dambulagala, Kanthi Lanka	Action Drama	Released on 8 October.
Lassanai Ballanna	Sunil Soma Peiris	Jeevan Kumaratunga, Sangeetha Weeraratne, Sriyani Amarasena, Sonia Disa, Cletus Mendis, Freddie Silva, Mervyn Jayathunga, Herbert Amarawickrama	Action Drama	Released on 15 October.
Langin Giyoth Ahak Naa	Hemasiri Sellapperuma	Ranjan Ramanayake, Geetha Kumarasinghe, Freddie Silva, Manel Chandralatha, Mervyn Jayathunga, Denawaka Hamine, Chitra Wakishta, Teddy Vidyalankara	Action Comedy	Released on 12 November.
Juriya Mamai	Louie Frandrastran	Ranjan Ramanayake, Dilani Abeywardana, Maureen Charuni, Sriyantha Mendis, J. H. Jayawardena, Mervyn Jayathunga, Tissa Wijesurendra, Dayananda Jayawardena	Adult Drama	Released on 9 December.
Madaraa Parasathu	Gladwin Fernando	Ravindra Randeniya, Swarna Mallawarachchi, Geetha Kumarasinghe, Sanath Gunathilake, Dayananda Jayawardena, Nawanandana Wijesinghe, Lucky Wickramanayake	Drama Thriller	Released on 10 December.
Suraweera Chandiyo	Hemasiri Sellapperuma	Jeevan Kumaratunga, Shashi Wijendra, Lal Weerasinghe, Ranjan Ramanayake, Dilhani Ekanayake, Dilani Abeywardana, Freddie Silva	Action	Released on 10 December.

== 1994 ==
Title	Director	Cast	Genre	Notes
Landuni Oba Devanganaki	Jayantha Das Perera	Sangeetha Weeraratne, Priyankara Perera, Lucky Dias, Menik Kurukulasooriya, Robin Fernando	Romance	Released on 28 January.
Nomiyena Minisun	Gamini Fonseka	Gamini Fonseka, Sangeetha Weeraratne, Damith Fonseka, Rex Kodippili, Trilicia Gunawardena, Thalatha Gunasekara, M. V. Balan	Action War-drama	Released on 4 February.
Rajawanshen Ekek	Hemasiri Sellapperuma	Sangeetha Weeraratne, Ranjan Ramanayake, Rex Kodippili, Freddie Silva, Bandu Samarasinghe, Manel Chandralatha, Thilak Ranatunga	Action comedy	Released on 18 February.
Ekadaa Wahi	Parakrama Jayasinghe	Kamal Addaraarachchi, Dilhani Ekanayake, Damith Fonseka, Cyril Wickramage, Nilmini Tennakoon, Kanthi Fonseka, Somapala Rathnayake	Drama	Released on 26 February.
Jayagrahanaya	Samson Kumarage	Devinda Marcus, Sanoja Bibile, Lucky Dias, Damayanthi Fonseka, Sathischandra Edirisinghe, Mervyn Jayathunga, Wilson Karu, Wimal Kumara de Costa	Action Drama	Released on 11 March.
Nohadan Kumariye	Ranga Wijendra	Shashi Wijendra, Sanjaya Leelaratne, Menik Kurukulasooriya, Roy de Silva, Dilani Abeywardana, Mervyn Jayathunga, Rex Kodippili, Mark Samson	Drama Romance	Released on 10 March.
Ambu Samiyo	Nishantha de Alwis	Joe Abeywickrama, Geetha Kumarasinghe, Vasanthi Chathurani, Amarasiri Kalansooriya, Cyril Wickramage, Ruby de Mel, Nawanandana Wijesinghe, Raja Sumanapala	Drama	Released on 1 April.
Abhiyogaya	Mario Jayathunga	Shashi Wijendra, Sanjaya Leelarathne, Geetha Kumarasinghe, Mervyn Jayathunga, Wimal Kumara de Costa, Denawaka Hamine, Samanthi Lanerolle, Herbert Amarawickrama	Action Drama	Released on 22 April.
Sujatha	Daya Wimalaweera	Sanath Gunathilake, Sabeetha Perera, Kamal Addaraarachchi, Dilani Abeywardana, Sathischandra Edirisinghe, Leena de Silva, Nawanandana Wijesinghe	Drama	Released on 6 May.
Nohadan Landune	Hemasiri Sellapperuma	Ranjan Ramanayake, Ravindra Randeniya, Dilhani Ekanayake, Palitha Silva, Veena Jayakody, Prasanna Fonseka, Freddie Silva	Drama Romance	Released on 13 May.
Dhawala Pushpaya	K.A.W. Perera	Ravindra Randeniya, Vasanthi Chathurani, Priyankara Perera, Anushi Hettiarachchi, Anjela Seneviratne, Vijaya Nandasiri, Mercy Edirisinghe, Manike Attanayake	Drama Romance	Released on 20 May.
Sandhamadala	Malini Fonseka	Malini Fonseka, Lucky Dias, Wimal Kumara de Costa, Dilani Abeywardana, Vishaka Siriwardena, Agnes Sirisena, Rathna Sumanapala, Srilal Abeykoon	Drama Comedy	Released on 15 June.
Ahas Maaliga	Sunil Ariyaratne	Shirani Nugera, Amarasiri Kalansooriya, D.R. Nanayakkara, Rex Kodippili, Ruby de Mel, Teddy Vidyalankara, Denawaka Hamine	Drama	Released on 16 June.
Pawana Ralu Wiya	Ranjith Kuruppu	Gamini Fonseka, Ravindra Randeniya, Veena Jayakody, Iranganie Serasinghe, Asoka Peiris, Joe Dambulagala, Dharmadasa Kuruppu, Miyuri Samarasinghe	Drama	Released on 17 June.
Yuwathipathi	Amaranath Jayathilake	Douglas Ranasinghe, Chandi Rasika, Wijeratne Warakagoda, Miyuri Samarasinghe, Elson Divithurugama, Chandra Kaluarachchi, Sujatha Paramanathan	Drama Romance	Released on 8 July.
Mavubime Weerayo	Ranjith Perera	Ranjan Ramanayake, Maureen Charuni, Thilak Jayaweera, Wimal Kumara de Costa, Hyacinth Wijeratne, Wilson Karu, Mercy Edirisinghe, Nihal Silva	Action Comedy	Released on 23 July.
Handana Kinkini	Mario Jayathunga	Lakshman Mendis, Anosha Sonali, W. Jayasiri, Miyuri Samarasinghe, Sureni Senarath, Rathna Lanka	Adult Drama	Released on 24 July.
Okkoma Hondatai	Hemasiri Sellapperuma	Freddie Silva, Ranjan Ramanayake, Dilhani Ekanayake, Manel Chandralatha, Teddy Vidyalankara, Herbert Amarawickrama, Ruby de Mel, Lilian Edirisinghe	Comedy	Released on 2 September.
150 Mulleriyawa	Somapala Leelananda	Malini Fonseka, Lucky Dias, Ranjith Perera, Lionel Deraniyagala, Bandu Samarasinghe, Richard Weerakody, Denawaka Hamine, Wimal Kumara de Costa	Drama	Released on 8 September.
Aragalaya	Christy Leonard Perera	Sangeetha Weeraratne, Ravindra Randeniya, Sriyantha Mendis, Sanjaya Leelaratne, Razi Anwar, Priya Ranasinghe, Veena Jayakody, Hemasiri Liyanage	Drama	Released on 9 September.
Athma	Somapala Leelananda	Ravindra Randeniya, Sanath Gunathilake, Sabeetha Perera, Mervyn Jayathunga, Wimal Kumara de Costa, Wilson Karu, Bandu Samarasinghe	Drama Thriller	Released on 16 September.
Sudu Piruwata	Roy de Silva	Ravindra Randeniya, Lucky Dias, Sriyani Amarasena, Dilhani Ekanayake, Sumana Amarasinghe, Ruwanthi Mangala, Roy de Silva	Drama	Released on 14 October.
Love 94	Roy de Silva	Lal Weerasinghe, Dilhani Ekanayake, Roy de Silva, Cletus Mendis, Bandu Samarasinghe, Sumana Amarasinghe, Tennyson Cooray, Ruwanthi Mangala	Comedy Drama	Released on 28 October.
Vijaya Geetha	Kandapola Kumarathunga	Priyankara Perera, Menik Kurukulasooriya, Vijaya Kumaranatunga, Vijaya Nandasiri, Freddie Silva, Mervyn Jayathunga, Sriyani Amarasena	Comedy Drama	Released on 11 November.
Shakthi	Shirley P. Wijeratne	Gamini Fonseka, Vijaya Kumaranatunga, Jeevan Kumaratunga, Anoja Weerasinghe, Cletus Mendis, Maureen Charuni, Mervyn Jayathunga	Action Drama	Released on 25 November.
Mee Haraka	I. N. Hewawasam	Sanath Gunathilake, Swarna Mallawarachchi, Linton Semage, Damitha Abeyratne, Denawaka Hamine, J. H. Jayawardena, Deepani Silva	Drama	Released on 9 December.
Hello My Darling	Hemasiri Sellapperuma	Sanath Gunathilake, Sabeetha Perera, Ranjan Ramanayake, Freddie Silva, Dilani Abeywardana, Bandu Samarasinghe, Mervyn Jayathunga	Comedy Romance	Released on 9 December.

== 1995 ==
Title	Director	Cast	Genre	Notes
Inspector Geetha	Dany W. Pathirana	Geetha Kumarasinghe, Sanath Gunathilake, Menik Kurukulasooriya, Bandu Samarasinghe, Freddie Silva, Wilson Karu, Mark Samson, Mervyn Jayathunga	Action Comedy	Released on 13 January.
Wasana Weva	Sunil Soma Peiris	Damith Fonseka, Sangeetha Weeraratne, Sonia Disa, Mervyn Jayathunga, Sunil Hettiarachchi, Chitra Wakishta, Piyadasa Wijekoon	Drama	Released on 27 January.
Vijay Saha Ajay	Roy de Silva	Lal Weerasinghe, Shashi Wijendra, Dilhani Ekanayake, Tennyson Cooray, Robin Fernando, Anoja Weerasinghe, Menik Kurukulasuriya	Action, Comedy	Released on 10 February.
Seilama	H. D. Premaratne	Anoja Weerasinghe, Ravindra Randeniya, Cyril Wickramage, Dilani Abeywardana, Daya Thennakoon, W. Jayasiri, Granville Rodrigo	Drama	Released on 10 March.
Rodaya	Bandu Samarasinghe	Bandu Samarasinghe, Nadeeka Gunasekara, Wilson Karu, Wimal Kumara de Costa, Tennyson Cooray, Mark Samson, Thalatha Gunasekara	Drama Comedy	Released on 31 March.
Ira Handa Illaa	Sunil Soma Peiris	Shashi Wijendra, Damith Fonseka, Dilani Abeywardana, Somy Rathnayake, Mervyn Jayathunga, Ananda Wickramage, Manel Wanaguru	Action Drama	Released on 28 April.
Pudumai Eth Aththai	Hemasiri Sellapperuma	Dilhani Ekanayake, Freddie Silva, Mervyn Jayathunga, Wilson Karunaratne, Lilian Edirisinghe, Manel Chandralatha, Tennyson Cooray, Berty Gunathilake	Comedy Action	Released on 5 May.
Deviyani Sathya Surakinna	M. V. Balan	Menik Kurukulasooriya, Cletus Mendis, Priyankara Perera, Somy Rathnayake, Sonia Disa, Lionel Deraniyagala, Mervyn Jayathunga	Action Drama	Released on 12 May.
Wairayen Wairaya	Hemasiri Sellapperuma	Sanath Gunathilake, Sabeetha Perera, Ranjan Ramanayake, Bandu Samarasinghe, Cletus Mendis, Wimal Kumara de Costa, Wilson Karunaratne, Freddie Silva	Action	Released on 26 May.
Demodara Palama	Dinesh Priyasad	Gamini Fonseka, Anula Karunathilaka, Shashi Wijendra, Sabeetha Perera, Tennyson Cooray, Sanoja Bibile. Lakshman Mendis	Drama Thriller	Released on 9 June.
Maruthaya	Wasantha Obesekara	Sanath Gunathilake, Sangeetha Weeraratne, Mahendra Perera, Yashoda Wimaladharma, Asoka Peiris, Lucky Dias, Kamal Addararachchi, Palitha Silva	Drama	Released on 9 June.
Chitti	Sarath Gunarathna	Sabeetha Perera, Jackson Anthony, Cletus Mendis, Somy Rathnayake, W. Jayasiri, Sureni Senarath, Hemasiri Liyanage, Daya Alwis	Drama Thriller	Released on 7 July.
Chandiyage Putha	Sunil Soma Peiris	Damith Fonseka, Sangeetha Weeraratne, Priyankara Perera, Harshani Dissanayake, Sonia Disa, Channa Perera, Sangeetha Weeraratne, Mervyn Jayathunga	Action	Released on 14 July.
Agey Wairaya	Louie Vanderstraeten	Chandi Rasika, Thilak Jayaweera, Mervyn Jayathunga, Wilson Karu, J. H. Jayawardena, Wimal Kumara de Costa, Damitha Saluwadana	Adult 18+	Released on 14 July.
Mama Baya Naa Shayma	M. S. Ananda	Gamini Fonseka, Bandu Samarasinghe, Somy Rathnayake, Bandu Munasinghe, Lakmal Fonseka, Eddie Amarasinghe, Lal Senadeera, Rodney Frazer	Comedy Action	Released on 25 August.
Awaragira	Lester James Peiris	Joe Abeywickrama, Kamal Addaraarachchi, Ranjan Ramanayake, Lucky Dias, Vasanthi Chathurani, Sanoja Bibile, Rathna Lalani Jayakody	Drama	Released on 1 September.
Edath Chandiya Adath Chandiya	V. Sivadasan	Jeevan Kumaratunga, Dilhani Ekanayake, Somy Rathnayake, Sriyani Amarasena, Kanthi Lanka, Mark Samson, Chandrasiri Kodithuwakku	Action	Released on 22 September.
Hitha Honda Surayo	Victor Maannage	Vijaya Kumaratunga, Shashi Wijendra, Cletus Mendis, Sanoja Bibile, Thilak Jayaweera, Tennyson Cooray, Sumana Gomes, Mervyn Jayathunga	Action	Released on 29 September.
Cheriyo Captain	Roy de Silva	Sanath Gunathilake, Sabeetha Perera, Shashi Wijendra, Freddie Silva, Tennyson Cooray, Bandu Samarasinghe, M. V. Balan, Cletus Mendis	Comedy Action	Released on 13 October.
Chandani	Sunil Soma Peiris	Jeevan Kumaratunga, Geetha Kumarasinghe, Priyankara Perera, Rex Kodippili, Tennyson Cooray, Sandun Wijesiri, Ananda Wickramage	Drama Romance	Released on 17 November.
Ayoma	Parakrama Niriella	Swarna Mallawarachchi, Jackson Anthony, Linton Semage, Somy Rathnayake, J. H. Jayawardena, Vincent Vaas, Roger Seneviratne	Drama Thriller	Released on 24 November.
Sudu Wallassu	Samson Kumarage	Ravindra Randeniya, Geetha Kumarasinghe, Cletus Mendis, Mervyn Jayathunga, Wimal Kumara de Costa, Sanoja Bibile, Hyacinth Wijeratne	Drama	Released on 24 November.
Dalulana Gini	Alerik Lionel Fernando	Dilhani Ekanayake, Damith Fonseka, Cletus Mendis, Ajith Jinadasa, Mervyn Jayathunga, Dayananda Jayawardena, Anjela Seneviratne, Teddy Vidyalankara	Drama	Released on 15 December.

== 1996 ==
Title	Director	Cast	Genre	Notes
Sathi	C. T. Perera	Ranjan Ramanayake, Gothami Pathiraja, Somy Rathnayake, Ruby de Mel, Hugo Fernando, Wimal Kumara de Costa, Sunil Hettiarachchi	Drama	Released on 19 January.
Api Baya Naa	Louie Vanderstraeten	Thilak Jayaweera, Chunky Ipalawatte, Chandi Rasika, Mervyn Jayathunga, Robin Fernando, Lal Kumara, Wilson Karu, Samadara Ariyawansa, Nilani Monarawila	Action	Released on 26 January.
Body Guard	Upali Piyarathna	Lal Weerasinghe, Sangeetha Weerarathne, Mervyn Jayathunga, Cletus Mendis, Sathischandra Edirisinghe, Herbert Amarawickrama, Teddy Vidyalankara	Action Romance	Released on 26 January.
Seeruwen Sitin	Winston Ajith Fernando	Rasika Silva, Gihan Fernando, Sangeetha Weerarathne	Action, Drama	Released on February.
Raththaran Malli	Sunil Soma Peiris	Damith Fonseka, Jeevan Kumaratunga, Sangeetha Weerarathne, Vasanthi Chathurani, Sonia Disa, Mervyn Jayathunga, Stanley Warnakula, Mercy Edirisinghe	Action, Drama	Released on 2 February.
Obatai Me Aradhana	Rohan Wanguru	Shashi Wijendra, Menik Kurukulasooriya, Gothami Pathiraja, Rex Kodippili, Mervyn Jayathunga, Alexander Fernando, Tennyson Cooray, Miyuri Samarasinghe	Action Comedy	Released on 23 February.
Sihina Deshayen	Boodee Keerthisena	Mahendra Perera, Palitha Silva, Janaka Kumbukage, Yashoda Wimaladharma, Roger Seneviratne, Buddhadasa Vithanarachchi, Janaka Kumbukage, Miyuri Samarasinghe	Drama	Released on 7 March.
Naralowa Holman	Dinesh Prasaad	Jeevan Kumaratunga, Sangeetha Weerarathne, Ranjan Ramanayake, Herbert Amarawickrama, Mervyn Jayathunga, Malkumari Geetharani, Sunil Hettiarachchi	Comedy Action	Released on 8 March.
Sura Daruwo	Cyril Weerasinghe	Ranjan Ramanayake, Judy de Silva, Cletus Mendis, Veena Jayakody, Manike Attanayake, Rex Kodippili, Freddie Silva, Mark Samson, Wilson Karu	Action Drama	Released on 5 April.
Mana Mohini	Hemasiri Sellapperuma,	Sabeetha Perera, Rajiv Nanayakkara, Ranjith Perera, Wilson Karu, Wimal Kumara de Costa, Freddie Silva, Srilal Abeykoon, Berty Gunathilake	Comedy Action	Released on 5 April.
Hitha Honda Nam Waradinne Naa	Ranjith Perera	Sangeetha Weerarathne, Damith Fonseka, Sanoja Bibile, Cletus Mendis, Kanthi Lanka, Mervyn Jayathunga, Hyacinth Wijeratne, Wimal Kumara de Costa, Devinda Marcus	Action Drama	Released on 5 April.
Veediye Weeraya	Siri Kularathne	Sanath Gunathilake, Sabeetha Perera, Bandu Samarasinghe, Tennyson Cooray, Sunil Hettiarachchi, Ajith Jinadasa, Wilson Karu, Chitra Wakishta	Action Comedy	Released on 27 May.
Sabe Mithura	Upali Piyarathna; Sherly P. Wijerathna	Sanath Gunathilake, Sabeetha Perera, Dilhani Ekanayake, Cletus Mendis, Rex Kodippili, Freddie Silva, Baptist Fernando, Sriyani Amarasena, Sunil Hettiarachchi	Action Drama	Released on 31 May.
Hitha Honda Gahaniyek	M. V. Balan	Geetha Kumarasinghe, Damith Fonseka, Joe Abeywickrama, Wimal Kumara de Costa, Thilak Jayaweera, Hyacinth Wijeratne, Sunil Hettiarachchi	Action Drama	Released on 28 June.
Seema Pawuru	Kumarasiri Abeykoon	Farina Lai, Cletus Mendis, Leena de Silva, Piyadasa Wijekoon, Samanthi Lanerolle, Tennyson Cooray, Dayananda Jayawardena, Sampath Tennakoon, Mike Fernando ,	Drama	Released on 5 July.
Thunweni Aha	Anura Chandrasiri	Jeevan Kumaratunga, Priyankara Rathnayake, Deepani Silva, Vasanthi Chathurani, Cyril Wickramage, Dilani Abeywardana, Jayalath Manoratne	Drama Thriller	Released on 24 July.
Hiru Sanduta Madi Ve	Hemasiri Sellapperuma	Douglas Ranasinghe, Palitha Silva, Anosha Sonali, Wilson Karu, Teddy Vidyalankara, Sarath Silva, Eddie Amarasinghe, Felix Anton	Drama	Released on 2 August.
Loku Duwa	Sumitra Peiris	Geetha Kumarasinghe, Jackson Anthony, Gamini Fonseka, Kamal Addaraarachchi, Joe Abeywickrama, Nadeeka Gunasekara, Veena Jayakody	Drama	Released on 16 August.
Sihina Vimane Raja Kumari	Upali Piyarathna	Jeevan Kumaratunga, Cletus Mendis, Nadeeka Gunasekara, Mervyn Jayathunga, Freddie Silva, Stanley Warnakula, Thalatha Gunasekara	Action Drama	Released on 30 August.
Mal Hathai	Hemasiri Sellapperuma	Ranjan Ramanayake, Dilani Abeywardana, Thilakarathna Liyanage, Wilson Karu, Teddy Vidyalankara, Berty Gunathilake, Srilal Abeykoon	Comedy Drama	Released on 20 September.
Cheriyo Darling	Roy de Silva	Joe Abeywickrama, Bandu Samarasinghe, Tennyson Cooray, Wimal Kumara de Costa, Dilhani Ekanayake, Ronnie Leitch, Damith Fonseka, Sanoja Bibile	Comedy	Released on 25 October.
Bithu Sithuwam	Milton Jayawardene	Joe Abeywickrama, Kamal Addaraarachchi, Dilani Abeywardana, Sathischandra Edirisinghe, Cyril Wickramage, Grace Ariyawimal, Hyacinth Wijeratne	Drama	Released on 1 November.
Amanthaya	Nihal Fernando	Douglas Ranasinghe, Sunethra Sarachchandra, Nihal Fernando, Henry Jayasena, Iranganie Serasinghe, Chandani Seneviratne, Pushpalatha Perera	Drama	Released on 23 November.
Bawa Sasara	Mario Jayathunga	Sanath Gunathilake, Sabeetha Perera, Sanoja Bibile, Rex Kodippili, Miyuri Samarasinghe, Linton Semage, Mervyn Jayathunga	Drama Thriller	Released on 29 November.
Maduri	K. A. W. Perera	Dilhani Ekanayake, Priyankara Perera, Sanoja Bibile, Ravindra Randeniya, Tennyson Cooray, Cletus Mendis, Anjela Seneviratne	Drama Comedy	Released on 6 December.

== 1997 ==
Title	Director	Cast	Genre	Notes
Yasoma	Mohan Niyaz	Nadeeka Gunasekara, Lucky Dias, Cletus Mendis, Ravindra Randeniya, Mervyn Jayathunga, Sanoja Bibile, Ignatius Gunaratne, Gothami Pathiraja	Adult Drama	Released on 3 January.
Ege Vairaya 2	Louie Vanderstraeten	Sumana Gomez, Chandi Rasika, Thilak Jayaweera, Chunky Ipalawatte, J. H. Jayawardena, Damitha Saluwadana, Somy Rathnayake, Tissa Wijesurendra	Adult 18+	Released on 17 January.
Duwata Mawaka Misa	Sumitra Peries	Sangeetha Weerarathne, Ranjan Ramanayake, Sanath Gunathilake, Vasanthi Chathurani, Tony Ranasinghe, Sriyani Amarasena, W. Jayasiri, Yashoda Wimaladharma	Drama	Released on 14 February.
Puthuni Mata Wasana	Sunil Soma Peiris	Jeevan Kumaratunga, Sangeetha Weerarathne, Sandun Wijesiri, Rex Kodippili, Cletus Mendis, Teddy Vidyalankara, Tyrone Michael, Thalatha Gunasekara	Drama	Released on 14 March.
Tharanaya	Sudath Devapriya	Jackson Anthony, Tony Ranasinghe, Sriyani Amarasena, Cletus Mendis, Inoka Amarasena, Sathischandra Edirisinghe, Trilicia Gunawardena	Drama	Released on 4 April.
Punaruppaththiya	Jayantha Ratnayake	Damith Fonseka, Jackson Anthony, Vasanthi Chathurani, Richard Weerakody, Leonie Kotalawela, Teddy Vidyalankara, Thilak Kumara Rathnayake, Wijeratne Warakagoda	Drama Thriller	Released on 18 April.
Surayo Wedakarayo	Hemasiri Sellapperuma	Ranjan Ramanayake, Robin Fernando, Sangeetha Weerarathne, Rex Kodippili, Freddie Silva, Tennyson Cooray, Wilson Karu, Manel Chandralatha	Action Comedy	Released on 18 April.
Ramba Saha Madhu	Roy de Silva	Ravindra Randeniya, Sumana Amarasinghe, Shashi Wijendra, Lal Weerasinghe, Dilhani Ekanayake, Tennyson Cooray, Mervyn Jayathunga, Stanley Warnakula	Drama Thriller	Released on 2 May.
Vijayagrahanaya	Kusumchandra Gamage	Veena Jayakody, Sahan Wijesinghe, Sriyani Amarasena, Mervyn Jayathunga, Lionel Deraniyagala, Tennyson Cooray, Sanoja Bibile, Gothami Pathiraja	Adult Drama	Released on 9 May.
Bawa Duka	Dharmasiri Bandaranayake	Jackson Anthony, W. Jayasiri, Swarna Mallawarachchi, Ravindra Randeniya, Hemasiri Liyanage, Somy Rathnayake, Rohana Baddage, Suvineetha Weerasinghe	Drama	Released on 30 May.
Ragaye Unusuma	Karu Disanayaka	Anusha Damayanthi, Sumana Gomes, Tissa Wijesurendra, Chunky Ipalawatte, Freddie Silva, Janesh Silva, Sandun Wijesiri, Damitha Saluwadana	Adult 18+	Released on 6 June.
Viyaru Geheniyak	Louie Vanderstraeten	Anusha Damayanthi, Chunky Ipalawatte, Wilson Karu, Tissa Wijesurendra, Lakshman Arachchige, Kapila Sigera	Adult 18+	Released on 13 June.
Mahameara Usata	Udayakantha Warnasuriya	Sangeetha Weerarathne, Kamal Addaraarachchi, Sriyantha Mendis, Wijeratne Warakagoda, Manel Jayasena, Srinath Maddumage, Sandun Wijesiri	Drama Thriller	Released on 21 June.
Apaye Thathpara Asu Haradahak	Dinesh Priyasad	Malini Fonseka, Gamini Fonseka, Ranjan Ramanayake, Tennyson Cooray, Sunil Hettiarachchi, Piyadasa Wijekoon, Mervyn Jayathunga, Rex Kodippili	Action Comedy	Released on 4 July.
Sudu Akka	Milton Jayawardena	Joe Abeywickrama, Sanoja Bibile, Mahendra Perera, Sanjaya Leelarathne, Veena Jayakody, Nawanandana Wijesinghe, Priya Ranasinghe, Chandra Kaluarachchi	Drama	Released on 8 August.
Pem Mal Mala	Bandu Samarasinghe	Bandu Samarasinghe, Dilhani Ekanayake, Berty Gunathilake, Wimal Kumara de Costa, Sunil Hettiarachchi, Sando Harris, Susila Kottage, Nawanandana Wijesinghe	Comedy	Released on 15 August.
Blendings	Mohan Niyaz	Sabeetha Perera, Roger Seneviratne, Cyril Wickramage, Ananda Wickramage, Manike Attanayake, Lal Weerasinghe, Mahesh Jayasinghe	Romantic Drama	Released on 21 August.
Savitrige Raththriya	Samantha Neelawathura	Veena Jayakody, Cletus Mendis, Tony Ranasinghe, Razi Anwar, Sanoja Bibile, Grace Ariyawimal, Ronnie Leitch, Sunil Soma Peiris	Adult 18+	Released on 29 August.
Raththaran Minihek	Sudesh Wasantha Peiris	Jeevan Kumaratunga, Geetha Kumarasinghe, Rex Kodippili, Samantha Epasinghe, Stanley Warnakula, Ranjith Perera, Eddie Amarasinghe, Sandun Wijesiri	Drama Action	Released on 29 August.
Bawa Karma	Dharmasiri Bandaranayake	Jackson Anthony, W. Jayasiri, Kamal Addaraarachchi, Swarna Mallawarachchi, Ravindra Randeniya, Hemasiri Liyanage, Suvineetha Weerasinghe	Drama	Released on 5 September.
Visidela	H. D. Premaratne	Jackson Anthony, W. Jayasiri, Mahendra Perera, Robin Fernando, Vasanthi Chathurani, Daya Thennakoon, Daya Alwis, Grace Ariyawimal	Adult Drama	Released on 7 November.
Ninja Sri Lanka	Robin Fernando	Damith Fonseka, Sangeetha Weerarathne, Ravindra Randeniya, Robin Fernando, Priyankara Perera, Cletus Mendis, Gnananga Gunawardena, Geetha Kanthi Jayakody	Action	Released on 21 November.
Good Bye Tokyo	Lionel Panduwawala	Jeevan Kumaratunga, Dilani Abeywardana, Cletus Mendis, Mervyn Jayathunga, Dayananda Jayawardane, Maureen Charuni, Thalatha Gunasekara	Drama Romance	Released on 5 December.

== 1998 ==
Title	Director	Cast	Genre	Notes
Gini Avi Saha Gini Keli	Udayakantha Warnasuriya	Jackson Anthony, Sriyantha Mendis, Palitha Silva, Mahendra Perera, Rangana Premaratne, Raja Sumanapala, Srinath Maddumage, Asoka Peiris	Crime	Released on 16 January. Represented Sri Lanka in the 1998 Singapore International Film Festival.
Yuda Gini Meda	Ranjith Siriwardena	Geetha Kumarasinghe, Alexander Fernando, Thilak Jayaweera, Sando Harris, Lal Senadeera, Wilson Karu, Sunil Hettiarachchi, Rathna Sumanapala	Action	Released on 20 February.
Aeya Obata Barai	Sunil Soma Peiris	Vijaya Kumaranatunga, Sanath Gunathilake, Nadeeka Gunasekara, Anoja Weerasinghe, Tony Ranasinghe, Thalatha Gunasekara, Tissa Wijesurendra	Romantic Drama	Released on 20 February.
Dehena	Priyantha Colombage	Sanath Gunathilake, Lucky Dias, Suvineetha Weerasinghe, H. A. Perera, Deepani Silva, Buddhi Wickrama, Gnananga Gunawardena, Chandi Rasika	Drama	Released on 27 February.
Re Daniel Dawal Migel	Roy de Silva	Bandu Samarasinghe, Tennyson Cooray, Ranjan Ramanayake, Sangeetha Weeraratne, Maduranga Chandimal, Roy de Silva, Sumana Amarasinghe, Ronnie Leitch	Comedy Action	Released on 23 March.
Sathutai Kirula Ape	Sunil Soma Peiris	Damith Fonseka, Sangeetha Weerarathne, Kamal Addaraarachchi, Robin Fernando, Kanthi Lanka, Eddie Amarasinghe, Sureni Senarath, Alexander Fernando	Drama	Released on 3 April.
Vimukthi	Priyantha Colombage	Sanath Gunathilake, Joe Abeywickrama, Sabeetha Perera, Veena Jayakody, H. A. Perera, Sriyantha Mendis, Granville Rodrigo	Drama	Released on 17 April.
Sagara Peraliya	Sena Samarasinghe	Gamini Fonseka, Rathnawali Kekunawela, Teddy Vidyalankara, Tyrone Michael, Mark Samson, Dilani Abeywardana	Drama Action	Released on 15 May.
Akkai Nagai	Sunil T. Fernando	Anusha Damayanthi, Sumana Gomes, Thilak Jayaweera, Neetha Kumari, Nihal Jayawardena, Samadara Ariyawansa, Eric Francis, Chathura Perera, Janesh Silva	Drama	Released on 22 May.
Chanda Kinnari	Asoka Handagama	Anoma Janadari, Hemasiri Liyanage, Swarna Mallawarachchi, Rukmal Nirosh, Buddhadasa Vithanarachchi, Roger Seneviratne, Denawaka Hamine	Drama	Released on 5 June.
Girl Friend	Louie Vanderstraeten	Anusha Damayanthi, Robin Fernando, Chunky Ipalawatte, Robin Fernando, Wilson Karu, Chandi Rasika, Mervyn Jayathunga, Srinath Maldeniya	Adult 18+	Released on 5 June.
Julietge Bhumikawa	Jackson Anthony	Anoja Weerasinghe, Kamal Addararachchi, Vasanthi Chathurani, Mahendra Perera, Daya Alwis, Chandani Seneviratne, Sriyantha Mendis	Musical Melodrama	Released on 31 July.
Anthima Reya	Gamini Fonseka	Gamini Fonseka, Malini Fonseka, Lucky Dias, Mahendra Perera, Daya Alwis, Cletus Mendis, Thalatha Gunasekara, Linton Semage, Miyuri Samarasinghe	Drama Thriller	Released on 31 July.
Ege Vairaya 3	Louie Vanderstraeten	Chunky Ipalawatte, Sumana Gomes, Thilak Jayaweera, Dayananda Jayawardena, Wilson Karu, Anusha Damayanthi, Janesh Silva, Raja Sumanapala, Teddy Vidyalankara	Adults 18+	Released on 7 September.
Ragini	D. L. Raja Nihal De Silva	Damith Fonseka, Sunethra Disanayaka, Alfred Perera, Mervyn Jayathunga, Shesha Palihakkara, Menik Kurukulasuriya, Veena Jayakody, Premila Kuruppu	Adults 18+	Released on 8 September.
Dorakada Marawa	Vasantha Obeysekera	Sanath Gunathilake, Sangeetha Weeraratne, Veena Jayakody, Sathischandra Edirisinghe, Rex Kodippili, Geetha Kanthi Jayakody, Roger Seneviratne	Drama	Released on 2 October.
Sexy Girl	Sunil Soma Peiris	Anusha Damayanthi, Roshan Pilapitiya, Sonia Disa, Cyril Wickramage, Dayananda Jayawardena, Janesh Silva, Chathura Perera, Teddy Vidyalankara	Adult 18+	Released on 6 November.
Mohothin Mohotha	Sunil Soma Peiris	Ranjan Ramanayake, Granville Rodrigo, Dayananda Jayawardena, Damitha Saluwadana, Chathura Perera, Janesh Silva, Arjuna Kamalanath	Drama Comedy	Released on 20 November.

== 1999 ==
Title	Director	Cast	Genre	Notes
Bahu Bharya	Udayakantha Warnasuriya	Sangeetha Weerarathne, Ranjan Ramanayake, Vasanthi Chathurani, Srinath Maddumage, Janak Premalal, Ranjith De Silva, Susan Fernando	Adult 18+	Released on 1 January.
Pawuru Walalu	Prasanna Vithanage	Mahendra Perera, Sangeetha Weerarathne, Nita Fernando, Tony Ranasinghe, Damayanthi Fonseka, Seetha Kumari, Roger Seneviratne	Drama	Released on 22 January.
Re Ru	Jayasekara Aponso	Dilhani Ekanayake, Jayasekara Aponso, Avanthi Aponso, Gamini Aponso, Dammika Aponso, Bandula Vithanage, Thilak Kumara Rathnayake,	Drama	Released on 19 February.
Ayadimi Sama	Hemasiri Sellapperuma	Sangeetha Weerarathne, Ranjan Ramanayake, Gothami Pathiraja, Leticia Peiris, Srilal Abeykoon, Wilson Karu, K. A. Piyakaru, Thalatha Gunasekara	Drama	Released on 2 March.
Salupata Ahasata	Mario Jayatunga	Veena Jayakody, Gayana Sudarshani, Lucky Dias, Miyuri Samarasinghe, Shalika Subasinghe, Wilson Karu, Samadara Ariyawansa	Adult 18+	Released on 5 March.
Paadadaya	Linton Semage	Linton Semage, Saumya Liyanage, G. R. Perera, Lal Kularatne, Trilicia Gunawardena, Sarath Kothalawala, Thilak Ranasinghe, Shyamalee Varusavithana	Drama	Released on 12 March.
Okkoma Kapatiyo	Sena Samarasinghe	Sabeetha Perera	Comedy	Released on 28 May.
Rathu Aluyama	Yasapalitha Nanayakkara	Ajith Jinadasa, Dilhani Ekanayake, Felix Premawardhana, Jayalath Manoratne, Nadeeka Gunasekara, Wimal Kumara de Costa, Daya Alwis, Ananda Wickramage	Drama	Released on 5 May.
Akunu Pahara	Samson Kumarage	Sanoja Bibile, Mervyn Jayathunga, Dilani Abeywardana, Alexander Fernando, Sureni Senarath, Shammi Fernando, Wimal Kumara de Costa, Lal Kumara	Drama Thriller	Released on 14 May.
Seetha Re	Dharma Sri Wickramasinghe	Kapila Sigera, Janesh Silva, Lakmal Fonseka, Arjuna Kamalanath, Susila Kottage, Damitha Saluwadana, Shehara Jayaweera, Sirimath Ediriweera	Drama	Released on 11 June.
Surayahana Gini Gani		Veena Jayakody, Sanoja Bibile, Sriyantha Mendis, Freddie Silva, Manel Chandralatha, Mahendra Perera, Rangana Premaratne, Nayana Kumari	Adult 18+	Released on 25 June.
Surangana Yahana	S. Kanapathipillai	Ramani Siriwardena, W. Jayasiri, Mahendra Perera, Shanthi Lekha, Sathischandra Edirisinghe, J. H. Jayawardena, Teddy Vidyalankara	Adult 18+	Released on 6 August.
Kolompoor	Dinesh Priyasad	Tennyson Cooray, Bandu Samarasinghe, Tony Ranasinghe, Dilhani Ekanayake, Freddy Silva, Wimal Kumara de Costa, Rex Kodippili, Sunil Hettiarachchi	Comedy	Released on 20 August.
Unusum Rathriya	Sunil T. Fernando	Sumana Gomes, Suresh Gamage, Sando Harris, Alexander Fernando, Janesh Silva, Chathura Perera, Samadara Ariyawansa, Sisira Kumaratunga, Eric Francis	Adult 18+	Released on 27 August.
Anduru Sewaneli	Ranga Wijendra	Anoja Weerasinghe, Ravindra Randeniya, Shashi Wijendra, Priyankara Perera, Dilani Abeywardana, Sureni Senarath, Hyacinth Wijeratne, Susila Kuragama	Drama Thriller	Released on 26 September.
Theertha Yathra	Vasantha Obeysekera	Ravindra Randeniya, Joe Abeywickrama, Yashoda Wimaladharma, Chandani Seneviratne, Veena Jayakody, Saumya Liyanage, Susila Kottage, Ravindra Yasas	Drama Thriller	Released on 1 October.
Koti Sana	Ranjith Siriwardena	Jeevan Kumaratunga, Dilhani Ekanayake, Anusha Damayanthi, Sonia Disa, Bandu Samarasinghe, Chunky Ipalawatte, Cletus Mendis	Action Thriller	Released on 21 October.
Seetha Sameere	Danny W. Pathirana	Palitha Silva, Dilhani Ekanayake, Sriyantha Mendis, Sunil Hettiarachchi, Granville Rodrigo, Sumana Gomes, Berty Gunathilake, Mahesh Jayasinghe	Romantic Thriller	Released on 19 November.
Mandakini	H.D. Premaratne	Sabeetha Perera, Ravindra Randeniya, Asoka Peiris, Pradeep Senanayake, Janaka Kumbukage, Shirani Kurukulasuriya, W. Jayasiri, Damitha Abeyratne	Drama	Released on 3 December.
Sathyadevi	Chandraratne Mapitigama	Jeevan Kumaratunga, Geetha Kumarasinghe, Ranjan Ramanayake, Miyuri Samarasinghe, W. Jayasiri, Susan Fernando, G. R. Perera, Rathnawali Kekunawela	Drama Action	Released on 10 December.
Nagaran	Nishantha de Alwis	Dilhani Ekanayake, Linton Semage, Susan Fernando, Nilmini Tennakoon, Cyril Wickramage, Geethal Perera, Hemasiri Liyanage, Tennyson Cooray	Crime Thriller	Released on 31 December.

== See also ==
- Cinema of Sri Lanka
- List of Sri Lankan films
