= 24th Sarasaviya Awards =

1996 awards festival for Sinhala cinema

- Date: September 1, 1996
- Site: Bandaranaike Memorial International Conference Hall, Colombo 07, Sri Lanka
- Directed by: Tilakaratne Kuruwita Bandara

Highlights
- Best Picture: Seilama
- Most awards: Seilama (10)
- Most nominations: Seilama

Television coverage
- Network: Associated Newspapers of Ceylon Limited

The 24th Sarasaviya Awards festival (Sinhala: 24වැනි සරසවිය සම්මාන උලෙළ), presented by the Associated Newspapers of Ceylon Limited, was held to honor the best films of 1995 Sinhala cinema on September 1, 1996, at the Bandaranaike Memorial International Conference Hall, Colombo 07, Sri Lanka. Minister Dharmasiri Senanayake was the chief guest at the awards night.

The film Seilama won the ten prestigious awards including Best Film.

== Awards ==
Category	Film	Recipient
Best Film	Seilama	Soma Edirisinghe
Best Director	Seilama	H. D. Premaratne
Best Script Writer	Seilama	Simon Navagattegama
Best Actor	Seilama	Ravindra Randeniya
Best Actress	Awaragira	Iranganie Serasinghe
Best Supporting Actor	Seilama	Cyril Wickramage
Best Supporting Actress	Awaragira	Vasanthi Chathurani
Best Cinematographer (color film)	Maruthaya	Suminda Weerasinghe
Best Editor	Seilama	Elmo Halliday
Best Music Direction	Seilama	Rohana Weerasinghe
Best Art Direction	Seilama	K. A. Milton Perera
Best Sound Effects	Awaragira	Lionel Gunaratne
Best Makeup	Seilama	Ranjith Manthagaweera
Best Lyricist	Seilama	Sunil Ariyaratne
Best Male Playback Singer	Chitti	Rookantha Gunathilake
Best Female Playback Singer	Chitti	Latha Walpola
Most Popular Film	Aege Vairaya	Karu Dissanayake
Best Upcoming Actor	Demodara Palama	Lakshman Mendis
Best Upcoming Actress	Chandiyage Putha	Ruwanthi Mangala
Rana Thisara Award	contribution to Sinhala cinema	Herby Seneviratne
Rana Thisara Award	contribution to Sinhala cinema	G. S. B. Rani
Merit Awards	Ayoma	Jackson Anthony
Merit Awards	Maruthaya	Sangeetha Weeraratne
Merit Awards	Chitti	Cletus Mendis
Merit Awards	Chitti	Carlo Wijesiri
Merit Awards	Demodara Palama	Dinesh Priyasad
Merit Awards	Demodara Palama	Nimalasiri Rosa

Category	Film
Popular films included in the festival	Aege Vairaya
Popular films included in the festival	Cheriyo Captain
Popular films included in the festival	Demodara Palama
Popular films included in the festival	Awaragira
Popular films included in the festival	Maruthaya
Popular films included in the festival	Ayoma
Popular films included in the festival	Seilama
