= Shashi Wijendra =

Sri Lankan actor

Shashi Wijendra ශෂී විජේන්ද්‍ර
- Born: Mohammed Auff Haneefa; 11 November 1959 (age 66); Kandy, Sri Lanka
- Other name: Shashi Quintus
- Education: Dharmadutha College, Badulla; Zahira College, Gampola
- Occupation: Film Actor
- Years active: 1985–1996
- Spouse: Shaheena (m. 1996)
- Children: 5
- Relatives: Ranga Wijendra (Brother)
- Awards: Sarasaviya Most Popular Actor Award (1992)

Mohammed Auff Haneefa (born 11 November 1959), popularly known as Shashi Wijendra, is a former actor in Sri Lankan cinema. He was one of the most popular actor in 1980s and 1990s. He quit from acting in 1996. Currently, he is a businessman and a politician.

== Early life and education ==
Shashi Wijendra was born on 11 November 1959 in Kandy and is a Muslim by birth. He completed primary education from Badulla Dharmadutha College and secondary education from Zahira College Gampola.

== Acting career ==
He first entered stage dramas under Tamil producer. His stage name was "Shashi Quintus". However, he was unable to read and write Tamil. Therefore, he used to translate the dialogues into Sinhala and started to act. After few months, he quit from acting and started to write stage plays. He produced the play Sahajatha and continued for more than 50 shows.

In 1983 he left the country and went to Dubai. After two years he returned to Sri Lanka. Haneefa joined the cinema in 1985 with the film Obata Diwura Kiyannam directed by Sunil Soma Peiris and produced the film along with Anoja Weerasinghe. It was a Super Hit and became the highest grossing Sri Lankan film in 1985. Then Shashi became a star in one night. He used the stage name "Shashi Wijendra" in cinema. Since then, he acted in many popular commercial films such as Amme Oba Nisa, Shakthiya Obai Amme, Uthura Dakuna, Cheriyo Captain, Obata Pamanai Adare, Wana Bambara, Okkoma Rajawaru, Raja Daruwo, Sinha Raja, Bambasara Bisaw, Soora Veera Chandiyo and Vijay saha Ajay. Most of his films are commercially successful and passed 100 days in theatres. In 1992, he won the award for the most popular actor at Sarasaviya Awards.

His brother Auff Munawer joined the cinema with Shashi and changed the name to Ranga Wijendra. He later became a film producer and director. The two had even announced their removal from the mosque because of their departure from the Muslim community. Later he converted to Muslim again with his brother after it was reported that due to pressure from the Muslim community. He and his brother quit from cinema at the peak of their career. His last film was Putha Mage Sooraya directed by Ranjith Jayasinghe screened in 2011.

== Personal life ==
Wijendra married a Sinhala woman in 1996 who later converted to Muslim with the name Shaheena. The couple have four sons and one daughter. In 1996, Haneefa left Sri Lanka and went to Malaysia. He returned to Sri Lanka in 2013 and Participated TV Programme on Sirasa TV. It was his first public appearance after 17 years. He is currently a successful businessman who runs a mahogany project on Dambulla Road, Matale.

== Filmography ==
Year	Film	Role	Ref.
1985	Obata Diwura Kiyannam	Shashi	
1987	Ahinsa	Himself	Special Appearance
1988	Amme Oba Nisa	Shashi	
1989	Okkoma Rajawaru		
1989	Shakthiya Obai Amme	Inspector S. D. 'Rannie' Randeniya / Asanka Randeniya	
1990	Jaya Shakthi		
1990	Wana Bambara	Dual Role	
1991	Uthura Dakuna		
1991	Sihina Ahase Wasanthaya	Amal	
1991	Obata Pamanai Adare	Saman	
1991	Hithata Dukak Nathi Miniha	Inspector	
1991	Asai Bayai	Gamini	
1991	Love In Bangkok	Sugath	
1991	Salambak Handai	Ravi Wijesuriya	
1991	Cheriyo Doctor	Nalin	
1992	Raja Daruwo	Thushan Kaluperuma CID 'Charith'	
1992	Sinha Raja	Samy	
1992	Okkoma Kanapita		
1992	Oba Mata Wishwasai	Saman	
1993	Sagara Thilina	Dasa	
1993	Bambasara Bisaw	Praba	
1993	Soora Veera Chandiyo	Inspector Ruwan Gajanayake	
1994	Nohadan Kumariyo		
1994	Abhiyogaya	Sanka	
1995	Vijay Saha Ajay	Vijay	
1995	Ira Handa Illa		
1995	Hitha Honda Surayo	Lawyer	
1995	Demodara Palama	Kamal	
1995	Cheriyo Captain	Ravi	
1996	Obatai Me Aradhana		
1997	Ramba Saha Madhu		
1998	Julietge Bhumikawa	Somasekera's friend	
1999	Anduru Sevaneli		
2000	Premila		
2001	Wasanthaye Kunatuwak		
2002	Seethala Gini Kandu	Rosy's husband	
2002	Thahanam Gaha	Wasantha	
2003	Sundarai Adare	Nuwan	
2006	Rana Hansi		
2008	Ai Oba Thaniwela		
2011	Putha Mage Suraya	Chamara / Priyantha	
