= Seethala Gini Kandu =

Seethala Gini Kandu සීතල ගිනි කඳු
- Directed by: Daya Wimalaweera
- Written by: Daya Wimalaweera
- Based on: Daya Wimalaweera; Bandu Samarasinghe
- Produced by: Daya Wimalaweera
- Starring: Jeevan Kumaratunga; Dilani Abeywardana; Kamal Addararachchi; Dilhani Ekanayake
- Cinematography: Daya Wimalaweera
- Edited by: Upasena Wimalaweera
- Music by: Sarath Dassanayake
- Production company: T.K Enterprises
- Release date: 22 March 2002
- Country: Sri Lanka
- Language: Sinhala

Seethala Gini Kandu (Sinhala: සීතල ගිනි කඳු Translation: Cold Volcanoes) is a 2002 Sri Lankan Sinhala thriller action film directed and produced by Daya Wimalaweera. It stars Jeevan Kumaratunga and Dilani Abeywardana in lead roles along with Kamal Addararachchi, and Dilhani Ekanayake. Music composed by Sarath Dassanayake. It is the 976th Sri Lankan film in the Sinhala cinema.

== Plot ==
Sunny aka 'Henahura' is a local crime lord who is producing and distributing illicit liquor. He lives with Rosy. Rosy was taken with him forcibly, as the settlement of debt her husband Buwa (Shashi) owed to Sunny. He has a biological daughter Nadee (Dilhani) from Sirimalee, a woman whom he raped (Menik Kurukulasooriya), and she lives with her mother. She is in love with her cousin Rohana, an ordinary youth who sells king coconut for living. Rohana’s sister Rashmi (Udaya Kumari Ranasinghe) is in love with an excise officer Sanka (Priyankara Perera).

When Dharme, one of Sunny’s thugs (Sando Harris) is imposing violence on an innocent person Addiya, Buwa intervenes and tells him to confront with someone who has gut. DHarme beats Buwa and challenges to anyone else. Rohana intervenes and beats him and his teeth are broken. Then the rift between Sunny and Rohana begins. While Rohana is coming to sign as witness for Dona Celesthina Josapeenu’s (Susila Kottage) marriage, he is attacked, and his belly is cut. Rosy’s husband Buwa, dressed in a bandage over his stomach, comes at night, attacks Sunny’s henchmen and sets fire on Sunny's Distillery. Sunny and his men think it was Rohana because of the bandage over the stomach. They attack Rohana’s house and Rohana’s mother (Deepani Silva) is killed. Rashmi, Nadee and her mother are taken to Sunny’s house. Sunny reveals who he is and then goes to bath. Rohana goes to avenge his mother’s murder. On the way he meets excise officer, and he also joins him. They manage to beat Sunny’s henchmen. Dharme who kills rohana's mother is killed in the fight. Rohana reaches the well where Sunny is being bathed by Rosy. As she sees Rohana coming closer, she rubs soap on Sunny’s face and eyes to avoid sunny seeing Rohana. Rohana drags by Rosy’s hair and throws her away. Rohana tries to stab Sunny, but Sunny manages to drop the knife. While Rohana and Sunny struggle to overpower the other, Nadee attacks sunny with an axe. Before dying, Sunny tells Nadee that he is her father.

== Cast ==
- Jeevan Kumaratunga as Sunny
- Dilani Abeywardana as Rosalyn aka Rosy
- Kamal Addararachchi as Rohana
- Dilhani Ekanayake as Nadee, Sunny's daughter
- Priyankara Perera as Sanka, excise officer
- Udaya Kumari as Rashmi, Rohana's sister
- Shashi Wijendra as Buwa, Rosy's husband
- Bandu Samarasinghe as Addiya
- Tennyson Cooray as Tamil policeman
- Wimal Wikramarachchi as excise chief
- Channa Perera as Doctor Niranjan Fonseka
- Denawaka Hamine
- Deepani Silva as Rohana's mother
- Susila Kottage as Dona Celesthina Josapeenu
- Mark Samson as Ranji
- Menik Kurukulasooriya as Sirimalee
- Sando Harris as Dharme
- Prasanna Fonseka as Sanka's father

== Soundtrack ==
No.	Title	Singer(s)	Length
1.	"Bhava Thrushna"	Nanda Malini
2.	"Getapichcha Suwandata"	Gratien Ananda, Chandrika Siriwardena
3.	"Heda Pennuwe Raja Wani"	Victor Vijayantha, Gratien Ananda, Walter Fernando, Maya Damayanthi, Susil Perera
