= Sathkampa =

Sathkampa සත්කම්පා
- Directed by: Chandraratne Mapitigama
- Written by: Chandraratne Mapitigama
- Produced by: Rohana Gunaratne
- Starring: Sabeetha Perera; Somy Rathnayake; W. Jayasiri
- Cinematography: Suminda Weerasinghe
- Edited by: Elmo Halliday
- Music by: Nawaratne Gamage
- Production companies: Prasad Color Labs, Madras
- Distributed by: Shan Films
- Release date: 28 October 2002
- Country: Sri Lanka
- Language: Sinhala

Sathkampa (Sinhala: සත්කම්පා) is a 2002 Sri Lankan Sinhala drama film directed by Chandraratne Mapitigama and produced by Rohana Gunaratne. It stars Sabeetha Perera and Somy Rathnayake in lead roles along with W. Jayasiri and Manike Attanayake. Music composed by Nawaratne Gamage. It is the 993th Sri Lankan film in the Sinhala cinema.

== Cast ==
- Sabeetha Perera as Kumari
- Somy Rathnayake as Dharmadasa
- Manike Attanayake as Yasawathi
- W. Jayasiri as Benjamin
- Wasantha Wittachchi as Mudalali
- Cletus Mendis as Saliya
- Sathischandra Edirisinghe as Kumari's father
- Grace Ariyawimal as Kumari's mother
- Damitha Saluwadana as Mudalali's wife
- Upasena Subasinghe
- Prasanna Fonseka
