= List of Sri Lankan films =

Films produced in Sri Lanka ordered by the date of release.

- List of Sri Lankan films of the 1940s
- List of Sri Lankan films of the 1950s
- List of Sri Lankan films of the 1960s
- List of Sri Lankan films of the 1970s
- List of Sri Lankan films of the 1980s
- List of Sri Lankan films of the 1990s
- List of Sri Lankan films of the 2000s
- List of Sri Lankan films of the 2010s
- List of Sri Lankan films of the 2020s

== See also ==
- Cinema of Sri Lanka
- Films based on Sri Lankan history
