= Nihal Silva =

Sri Lankan actor

Nihal Silva නිහාල් සිල්වා
- Born: Dahanayakage Nihal Ranjith Silva; 10 January 1954; Kirilapone, Sri Lanka
- Died: 3 December 1989 (aged 35); Dehiwala, Sri Lanka

Dahanayakage Nihal Ranjith Silva (Sinhala:නිහාල් සිල්වා) (10 January 1954 – 3 December 1989), popularly known as Nihal Silva, was a Sri Lankan comedian and actor. He rose to fame playing Sargeant Nallathambi in the play of the same name. The character was a stereotypical Tamil Hindu with a bald head, small moustache, police suit and Vibhuti, three lines of ash, on his forehead.

== Personal life ==
Silva was born on January 10, 1954, in Kirilapone and grew up in Nuwara Eliya, Sri Lanka as the youngest of the family. His father was Dahanayakage Andrew De Silva, who worked in Railway Department. His mother was Wataketiya Rajapaksage Lucyhami. She worked as a hospital attendant. Silva has three elder sisters, Malini, Shriyawathi and Padmini and three elder brothers, Nimal, Siripala. Silva educated at Sri Waishaka Vidyalaya, Wellawatte and Sri Watawala Maha Vidyalaya, Hatton.

== Death ==
Silva was shot to death by Sri Lanka Army soldiers as he ignored warnings and ran a checkpoint on December 3, 1989, in Dehiwela; he possibly did not understand the situation due to inebriation.

== Career ==
Nihal first acted in the 1975 Vesak drama, Desha Drohiya directed by Asoka Senarath Mudali for the Kirulapone Pradeshiya Sabha Youth Union. Asoka Senarath Mudalige was given the opportunity to perform for the first time on a public stage. He played the father of two other friends Raja and Jinadasa in the drama Mehve Rate. He was in the police station when Premadasa Hettigoda produced a play Bahukolam Sohon Bere. He subsequently had roles in stage plays like Amal Biso, Ambalamaka Nade and Le Kandulu.

His maiden cinema acting came through 1974 film Hadawath Naththo with an uncredited role in a dance troop. Nihal has been given the opportunity to act in a movie as a character in the 1980 film Jodu Walalu directed by S. Dayananda's with a role of Tamil garden watcher. Nihal played the role "Maddume" in the film Kadira, which has influenced to give the opportunity to play a character in the film Rosy by director Yasapalitha Nanayakkara. Then he acted in many commercially successful films such as Sathweni Dawasa, Ahimi Dadayama, Kawuluwa and Kiri Madu Wal.

Nihal first worked as a drama producer in the play Sathuro directed by Jayasekara Aponsu. Then he produced the play Sabhawaniya Kaakko where Australian actor John Musso is also acted in the play. Nihal subsequently produced Rudira Wanija drama and then worked in Kawuruth Enne Nehe and Ayith Ithin Heta produced by Pathiraja L. S. Dayananda. Some of his notable stage drama acting came through Punthila and Ran Salakuna. He first played Sajan Nallathambi in the play Neinage Suduwa by Daya Wayaman in 1985. The play Sajan Nallathambi was one of the first Sri Lankan plays to be a financial success. It was hugely popular, even playing in the Middle East to Sinhala audiences with successful 366 shows. After its run, a slew of similar comedies like Ralla, Commando Diyasena, and Vadamaarachi appeared in Sri Lankan theaters inspired by its success.

== Filmography ==
- No. denotes the Number of Sri Lankan film in the Sri Lankan cinema.

Year	No.	Film	Role
1974	288	Hadawath Naththo	
1978	395	Selinage Walawwa	Evicted resident
1978	404	Kumara Kumariyo	Drummer
1980	441	Jodu Walalu	
1980	465	Sinhabahu	
1981	475	Sathweni Dawasa	
1981	504	Saranga	
1982	512	Bicykale	Batta
1982	524	Pradeepa	
1982	529	Situ Diyaniya	
1983	557	Thuththiri Mal	
1983	568	Chandi Patau	Sargent
1984	607	Birinda	
1985	622	Doringe Sayanaya	
1985	626	Rosy	
1985	634	Kiri Maduwal	
1986	637	Prarthana	
1986	642	Gimhane Gee Nade	Malhami
1987	654	Hitha Honda Chandiya	Shop owner
1987	660	Kiwulegedara Mohottala	Kotebe rala
1987	663	Kawuluwa	
1988	680	Satana	
1988	682	Ko Hathuro	
1989	688	Okkoma Rajawaru	
1989	692	Sinasenna Raththaran	
1989	693	Waradata Daduwam	
1990	700	Yukthiyata Wada	Anton
1990	701	Dedunnen Samanaliyak	
1990	704	Hodin Nathnam Narakin	
1990	707	Pem Raja Dahana	
1990	711	Chandi Raja	
1990	713	Honda Honda Sellam	Nihal Silva aka Yakka
1990	714	Hitha Honda Puthek	
1991	719	Wada Barinam Wadak Na	
1991	727	Raja Sellan	
1991	729	Esala Sanda	
1991	732	Ran Hadawatha	
1991	734	Cheriyo Doctor	Doctor Moco
1991	736	Dhanaya	
1991	741	Ma Obe Hithwatha	
1992	742	Ranabime Weeraya	
1992	760	Oba Mata Wiswasai	Charlie
1992	764	Muwan Palasse Kadira	
1992	767	Rajek Wage Puthek	
1992	749	Sakwithi Raja	
1992	751	Ahimi Dadaman	Sinna
1993	771	Sargent Nallathambi	Sargent Nallathambi
1993	776	Sasara Sarisarana Thek Oba Mage	Malhami
1993	790	Juriya Mamai	
1994	808	Mawubime Weerayo	
1995	820	Inspector Geetha	Jonny
1998	891	Aya Obata Barai	Sargent Silva
2007	1091	Hai Master	
