= Granville Rodrigo =

Sri Lankan actor (1958–1999)

Granville Rodrigo ග්‍රැන්විල් රොද්‍රිගෝ
- Born: Senadhipathige Granville Rodrigo; 22 September 1958; Colombo, Sri Lanka
- Died: January 14, 1999 (aged 40); National Hospital, Colombo
- Education: St. Benedict's College, Colombo
- Occupations: Actor, Dramatist, Singer
- Years active: 1980–1999
- Spouse: Shamali Rodrigo
- Children: Chirath Rodrigo Thisal Rodrigo Madupa Rodrigo
- Awards: Best Art Direction

Senadhipathige Granville Rodrigo (22 September 1958 – 14 January 1999), popularly known as Granville Rodrigo, was an actor in Sri Lankan cinema, stage drama and television as well as a singer and art director. A highly versatile actor from drama to comedy, he is best known for his role in Manokaya and as Nihal Karapitiya in the teledrama Nonawaruni Mahathwaruni. He was also a former navy officer.

He died on 14 January 1999 at the age of 40, while receiving treatment after a road accident.

== Personal life ==
He was born on 22 September 1958 in Colombo, Sri Lanka. He completed education from De La Salle College, Modera and St. Benedict's College, Colombo.

He married Shamali Rodrigo on 17 January 1987. The couple had three sons - Chirath, Thisal and Madupa.

== Career ==
He started his acting career with the stage drama Mahasara directed by maestro Ediriweera Sarachchandra. He played varied roles in Maname, Sinhabahu, Simon Nawagattegama's Subha Saha Yasa. Dharmasiri Bandaranayake's Ekadipathi, Vijitha Gunaratna's Sakya. Rodrigo started his film career with a minor role in 1978 film Veera Puran Appu directed by renowned filmmaker Lester James Peries. Some of his popular cinema acting came through Seilama, Mohothin Mohotha and Thunweni Yamaya. He also acted in Hector Kumarasiri's teledramas such as Dikkasadaya and Nikma Yaama. He was the lead actor in Nikma Yaama teleplay.

Apart from acting, he was a renowned art director. In 1985, he won the award for Best Art Direction at Presidential Film Awards in Dharmasiri Wickremaratne's Himakatara and in 1986 Sarasaviya Award for the Dharmasiri Bandaranayake's Suddilage Kathawa.

He was a Radio Ceylon singer who sang a number of popular songs, such as Ota Damanya, Mayawo Akal Mako, Devale Natha Deviyo and Chandana Maldam. He released a song cassette Ota Damanya comprising 16 dance numbers in Veddha songs which get enormous popularity in outdoor musical shows. He acted and directed music for K.A.W. Perera's Paasal Guruwari as well.

=== Selected Stage Dramas ===
- Mahasara
- Maname
- Sinhabahu
- Malawunge Rathriya
- Meepura Wasiyo
- Suba Saha Yasa
- Ekadipathi
- Sakya
- Mawathe Api

=== Selected Tele Dramas ===
- Bim Kaluwara
- Dikkasadaya
- Kadaima
- Sandagalathenna
- Lokanthaya
- Pasal Guruwari
- Manookaya
- Nikma Yaama
- Nonawaruni Mahathwaruni
- Sinasenna Mata
- Suseema
- Tharu
- Maalathi Mal

== Death ==
On 10 January 1999, Rodrigo was involved in a head on collision at Maharagama junction while travelling in a van to participate in a Dhamma School prize giving with fellow actors. He was seated in the front of a van when the accident occurred and both his legs were broken below the knee on impact. He had several large burn injuries on his legs and right foot due to boiling radiator water splashing on him. He was quickly admitted to the accident service ward of the National Hospital, Colombo. His burns were treated with an ointment and he was given an antibiotic with the intravenous saline. After being admitted to Ward 74, it was noted that his condition was improving, where he smile and spoked with his wife. On 13th, he coughed up some blood and on 14th doctors ordered an ESR test. The test indicated a high level of white blood cells. However, he died on 14 January 1999 due to septicaemia caused by burn wounds on his legs. According to specialist doctors, a blood clot forms due to contusions and through feces it travels to the lungs and blocks its blood supply. His postmortem report revealed haemorrhaging in the lungs, kidneys and liver due to sepsis. Doctors said that he had not shown any external signs of sepsis.

His funeral took place at Madampitiya public cemetery.

== Legacy ==
On 4 May 2002, a rugby tournament named Granville Rodrigo Memorial Junior Novices Rugby Tournament 2002' was held at Vistwyke Playgrounds Mattakkuliya in memory of the actor. The chief organizer of the event was Basil Rodrigo.

== Filmography ==
- No. denotes the Number of Sri Lankan film in the Sri Lankan cinema.

Year	No.	Film	Role	Ref.
1978		Veera Puran Appu	Rebel	
1980		Hansa Vilak	Police officer	
1981		Sudda		
1983		Dadayama	Peter's companion	
1983		Thunwani Yaamaya	Bargoer	
1983		Menik Maliga		
1984		Hima Kathara		
1985		Suddilage Kathawa	Avusadaya's trial viewer	
1986		Dewduwa		
1989		Kedapathaka Chaya	Credit seeker's brother	
1989		Sri Medura		
1990		Saharawe Sihinaya		
1995		Seilama		
1997		Les mystères de Sadjurah	Home movie	
1998		Vimukthi		
1998		Mohothin Mohotha		
1999		Seetha Samire		
2001		Oba Magema Wewa	Posthumous release	
