= Anoja Weerasinghe =

Sri Lankan actress

Anoja Weerasinghe අනෝජා වීරසිංහ
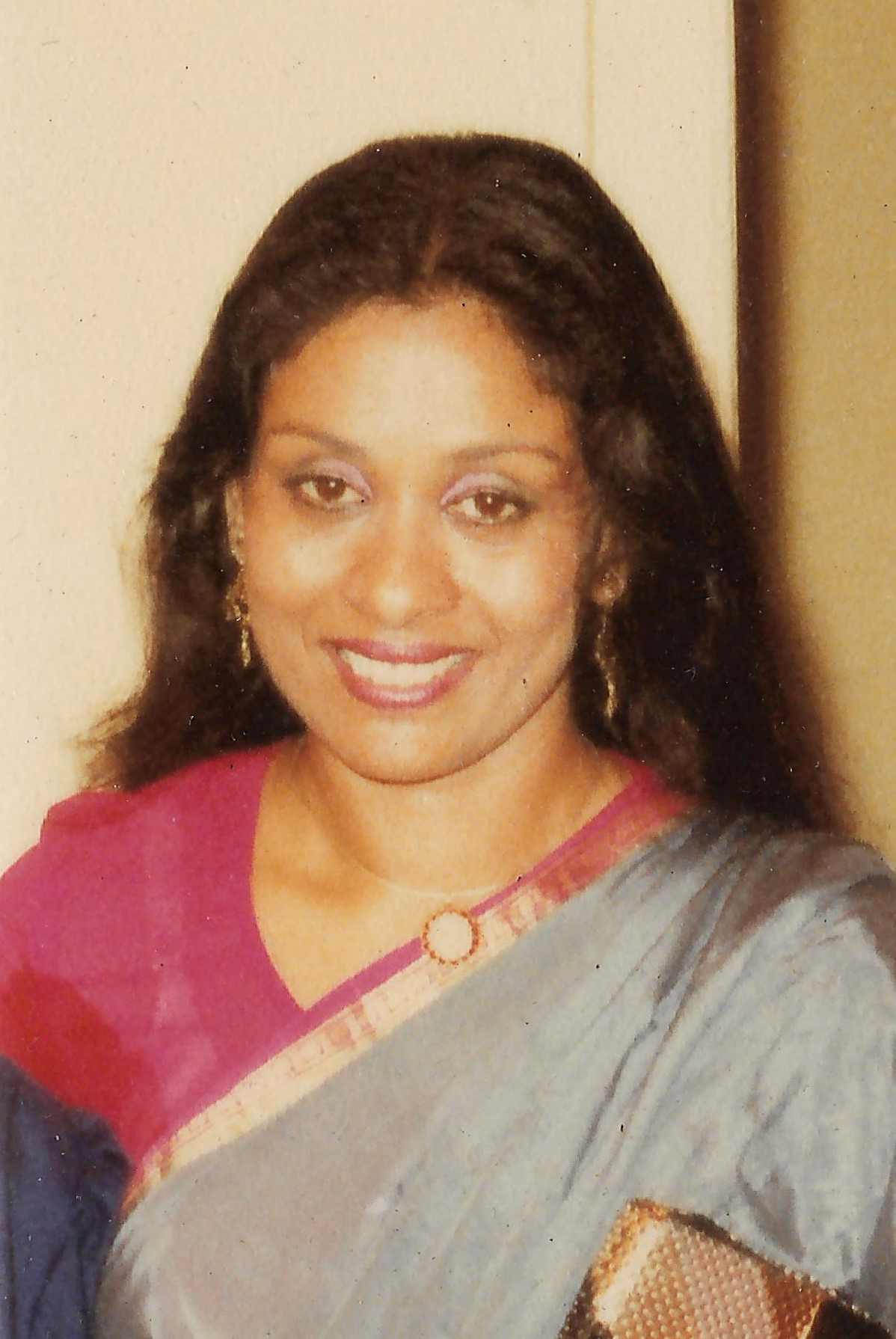
- Born: Paranapalliya Guruge Anoja Kanthi Siriwardena; January 21, 1955 (age 71); Badulla, Sri Lanka
- Education: Prince of Wales College, Moratuwa
- Occupations: Actress, writer
- Years active: 1987–present
- Children: 1

Paranapalliya Guruge Anoja Kanthi Siriwardena (Sinhala:අනොජා වීරසිංහ), popularly known as Anoja Weerasinghe (born January 21, 1955), is an actress in Sri Lankan cinema, stage drama and television. One of the most respected film actresses in Sinhala cinema, Weerasinghe won the Golden Award at New Delhi Film Festival for her critics acclaimed movie Maldeniye Simion.

== Personal life ==
Born on 21 January 1955 near Badulla, as the seventh of the 12 siblings in the family which includes seven daughters and five sons. Her father was Jeldeen Siriwardena and mother was Wijayasinghe Arachchige Seelavathi. Anoja had older siblings: Shanthi, Sunethra, Asoka, Sunil and Maya Damayanthi. Anura, Shiyan, Lekha, Sandhya, Sudath are younger brothers and sisters.

After few years, the family moved to Monaragala due to many political disputes. Her father was a theatre actor who performed in stage dramas such as Barrister Hamu and Hingana Kolla. Her first marriage was celebrated in 1979 and lasted only for twelve years, where she married again to a plantation owner in 1991.

With the failure of her second marriage, she faced a number of challenges where she went to commit suicide seven times. Once she swallowed a bunch of sleeping pills due to stress and depression.

== Career ==
Meanwhile, when Anoja was in grade 9, she acted in the play Anduren Eliyata produced by Newton Gunaratne and Yoga Balasuriya of Mahanama College, Moneragala. Weerasinghe first came to the screen with a minor role in Yasapalitha Nanayakkara's film Tak Tik Tuk. Her first main role came through role Surangi of Yasapalitha's film Monarathenna. She appeared in the Australian film Island in 1989.

In the film Maldeniye Simieon, she played dual roles, which became her turning point. For the roles, she won the Best Supporting Actress at the 11th New Delhi International Film Festival. Then she established herself in the 1980s in Sinhala cinema, made her mark in popular cinema with the film Obata Diwura Kiyannam. Her popular role in 1980s came through Araliya Mal, Channayi Kello Dennayi, Peraḷikārayō, Mamayi Rajā, Sināsenna Raththaran and Yukthiyaṭa Væḍa. She later won Best Actress award at Sarasaviya, Presidential, OCIC and Swarnasanka awards for her performances in artistic films such as Kelimadala, Gurugedara, Surabidena, Julietge Bhumikawa, Muhudu Lihini, Seilama, Siri Medura and Janelaya.

Weerasinghe rose to popularity in cinema and acclaim after winning the Silver Peacock Award for the Best Actress at the New Delhi International Film Festival in 1987 for the film Maldeniye Simion, directed by Dr. D. B. Nihalsinghe and produced by Vijaya Ramanayake for Tharanga Films. This was the first time a Sri Lankan actress won a best actress award at an international film festival. Thereafter she went on to LAMDA in London to further hone her skills and won further accolades, nationally and internationally. She has been honored with the Kohinoor Award by the Governor of Tamil Nadu, Government of Sri Lanka's Kala Suri national award, the Asian Film Center tribute to her in 1994, Munich International Film Festival retrospective of her films, and the state governments of Kerala and West Bengal retrospectives of her films are among the many accolades she has received.

Apart from Sinhala films, Anoja played a leading role in the Australian film Island directed by Paul Cox. She has also acted in Pakistani Urdu films like Raththathin Rath Thame, India-Sri Lanka co-production film Hum Se Na Takrana, Agar Tum Na Hote, Suraj Bhi Tamasha, Miss Lanka, Naadani, and Do Haath. After that, she studied music, acting and voice acting at the London Academy of Music and Dramatic Art (Lamda) in London. After return to Sri Lanka, she started the 'Advanced Performing Arts Institute' on the land belonging to the Bellanwila Rajamaha Vihara adjoining temple.

== Stage dramas ==
- Satana
- Prashnaya
- Age Nama Rathi
- Manaskola
- Trojan Kanthawo'
- Diriya Mawa Saha Age Daruwo
- Ran Salakuna
- Memories of Monkey boy

== Awards ==
She is a recipient of many local, regional and international awards.

- Presidential Special Award 1984 - Muhudu Lihini
- Sarasaviya Awards 1985 - Hithwathiya
- Presidential Award 1985 Merit Award - Hithawathiya
- Sarasawiya Award 1986 Merit Award - Mihidum Salu
- Best Actress in 1986 State Awards
- Best Costume Design in 1986 State Awards
- Sarasaviya Awards 1986 Best Film - Obata Diwura Kiyannam
- Best Actress in 1987 Sarasaviya Awards - Maldeniye Simion
- Best Actress in 1987 OCIC Awards - Maldeniye Simion
- Best Actress in 1987 Presidential Awards - Maldeniye Simion
- Rajatha Mayura Award for Best Actress in 1987
- Best Actress in 11th Indian International Film Festival - Maldeniye Simion
- Best Television Actress in 1987 - Thaara Devi
- Rana Thisara Award in 1987
- Kalsuri Award in 1987
- Honor Award in 1987
- Woman of the Year 1987 - Vanitha Award at Rotary International Club
- Best Actress in 1990 Sarasaviya Awards - Sirimedura
- Best Actress in 1987 OCIC Awards - Sirimedura
- Koinor Rathna Award 1990
- Most Popular Actress in 1991 Vanitha Award
- Best Actress in 1992 Sarasaviya Awards - Kelimadala
- Best Actress in 1992 OCIC Awards - Kelimadala
- Best Producer in 1992 Sarasaviya Awards - Kelimadala
- Best Actress in 1994 Sarasaviya Awards - Surabidena
- Best Actress in 1994 Presidential Awards - Gurugedara
- Best Actress in 1994 Swarna Sankha Award - Surabidena
- Fringee First Award at Edinburg Drama Festival 2005 - Children of the Sea producer
- Tap Water Award at Edinburg Drama Festival 2005 - Children of the Sea producer
- Best Actress in 2006 State Awards - Diriya Mawa Saha Age Daruwa

== Filmography ==
- No. denotes the Number of Sri Lankan film in the Sri Lankan cinema.

Year	No.	Film	Role	Ref.
1979	423	Monarathenna	Suranji	
1980	440	Tak Tik Tuk		
1980	465	Sinhabahu		
1981	487	Amme Mata Samawenna	Dulcy	
1981	492	Dayabara Nilu		
1981	493	Geethika	Naalika	
1981	499	Aradhana		
1981	504	Saaranga		
1982	534	Kale Mal	Pushpalatha	
1983	548	Kaliyugaya		
1983	560	Hasthi Viyaruwa		
1983	562	Pasa Mithuro		
1983	564	Menik Maliga		
1983	571	Monarathenna 2		
1984	574	Muhudu Lihini		
1984	583	Niwan Dakna Jathi Dakwa		
1984	584	Thaththai Puthai	Anoja	
1984	590	Hithawathiya		
1984	601	Batti	Kosala	
1985	612	Mihidum Salu		
1985	613	Mawubima Nathnam Maranaya		
1985	616	Araliya Mal		
1985	620	Channai Kello Dennai		
1985	621	Aeya Waradida Oba Kiyanna		
1985	624	Obata Diwura Kiyanna		
1985	629	Varsity Kella		
1985	608	Miss Lanka		
1986	636	Mal Warusa	Soma	
1986	640	Peralikarayo		
1986	643	Maldeniye Simion	Jane / Somawathi	
1987	644	Devuduwa		
1987	654	Hitha Honda Chandiya		
1987	655	Janelaya	Mrs. Weerasinghe	
1987	656	Sathyagrahanaya		
1987	662	Kale Kella		
1988	670	Ahinsa		
1988	673	Chandingeth Chandiya		
1988	682	Ko Hathuro		
1988	681	Nawatha Api Ekwemu		
1989	685	Mamai Raja	Nisha	
1989	689	Obata Rahasak Kiyannam		
1989	692	Sinasenna Raththaran		
1989	694	Randenigala Sinhaya		
1989	696	Sirimadura		
1990	700	Yukthiyata Wada		
1990	702	Weera Udara		
1990	707	Pem Raja Dahana	Rekha Gajasinghe	
1991	714	Hitha Honda Puthek		
1991	721	Sihina Ahase Wasanthaya		
1991	722	Kelimadala		
1991	724	Hithata Dukak Nathi Miniha	Yasawathi	
1991	729	Asala Sanda		
1991	732	Ran Hadawatha		
1991	741	Ma Obe Hithawatha		
1992	742	Ranabime Veeraya		
1992	746	Rajadaruwo		
1992	757	Me Ware Mage		
1993	770	Guru Gedara		
1993	772	Surabidena	Soma	
1993	775	Wali Sulanga		
1994	817	Shakthi		
1995	822	Vijay Saha Ajay		
1995	824	Seilama	Siriya	
1998	891	Aya Obata Barai		
1998	902	Julietge Bhumikawa	Anjali Senanayake	
1999	921	Aduru Sewanali		
2002	983	Thahanam Gaha	Seetha	
2003	1001	Pura Sakmana	Gunawathi	
2003	1016	Yakada Pihatu	Manuja	
2014	1213	Thanha Rathi Ranga	Wimal's Mother	
1989	-	The Island		
2014	-	Human Touch		
