= Berty Gunathilake =

Sri Lankan actor and comedian (1924–2022)

Berty Gunathilake බර්ටි ගුණතිලක
- Born: Besthiyage Don Bertie Sangathissa Gunathilake; 2 August 1924; Ampitiya, Kandy, British Ceylon
- Died: 6 March 2022 (aged 97); Kahawatta, Sri Lanka
- Education: Sangharaja Pirivena, Kandy
- Occupations: Actor, comedian
- Years active: 1947–2003
- Spouse: Soma Gunathilake
- Children: Four
- Awards: Desha Nethru

Mesthiyage Don Bertie Sangathissa Gunathilake (Sinhala: බර්ටි ගුණතිලක; 2 August 1924 – 6 March 2022), popularly known as Berty Gunathilake, was an actor and comedian in Sri Lankan cinema and television. He was most notable for the role "Baba" in television comedy sitcom Vinoda Samaya.

== Personal life ==
Gunathilake was born on 2 August 1924 in Ampitiya, Kandy. He received his primary education at Ampitiya Primary School and then secondary education at Sangharaja Pirivena in Kandy. After that he joined the Ayurvedic Medical College. After school times, he joined as an Assistant Teacher at Galpola College, Kuliyapitiya. Then he started a bookstore until he was bored by the job and then worked as a proofreader in the Sinhala Bauddaya newspaper. He was in the distribution department at the inception of the 1953 People's Newspaper. In 1953, he joined Lake House publishers with the help of Chandraratne Manawasinghe and Meemana Premathilake. He worked there as a junior pastor for twelve years. During that time, he joined the struggles conducted by the Lake House trade union. As a result, he lost his job.

He was married to Soma Gunathilake, a teacher. He met Soma during a school function when Gunathilake was invited as a guest at a function held at Amatiyagoda College, Godakawela. His wife died in 1993.

The couple had two sons – Bharatha and Harsha; and two daughters – Jeevani and Kumuduni. Bharatha is a television technician. Harsha is a businessman. Kumuduni works for the Rupavahini Corporation.

Gunathilake died at the Kahawatta Base Hospital in Kahawatta on 6 March 2022, at the age of 97.

== Career ==
Gunathilake joined the Radio Ceylon in 1947 from Lama Pitiya program. Then he joined the 1948 radio play Vinoda Samaya along with Joseph Seneviratne, Vincent Weerasekera, Harriet Suraweera, Pitipana Silva and Sisira Kumara Manickaarachchi. In 1952, Bertie was anointed as Sri Lanka's first amateur comedian in the Bushels Coffee program hosted by Thevis Guruge.

In 1954, Gunathilake along with his close friends Annesley Dias and Samuel Rodrigu presented the comic program Vihilu Thahalu for Radio Ceylon under the guidance of H.D. Wijedasa. It became extremely popular and they were colloquially known as Raja Thun Kattuwa. In later years, many more characters were included in the program such as Gemunu Wijesuriya, Joseph Seneviratne, Alfred Perera and Mercy Edirisinghe.

In 1983, television shows started in Sri Lanka. The trio - Berty, Annesley and Samuel included in television's founding program Nandana Vindana. From 1960 to 1990, they appeared in almost every comedy show in television and radio. Once, Gunathilake pretended a role "Two Tone" as a schoolboy, wearing a pair of shorts, a teat in his mouth, a bottle of water, a pencil and a book in the popular comedy sitcom Vinoda Samaya. The character was highly popularized. He has written most of the episodes of Vinoda Samaya, such as "Apuru Maluwa", "Santhoshaya", "Athe Amaruwa", "Apuru Adaraya", "Maduru Mediri Resweema", and Uu mata Gehuwa, Mata uu Gehuwa.

It was a story told by a man on the Kiribathgoda bus in Angulana who had been talking about a rivalry that had taken place in the early days. It is all about how he has been hit by others, and he cannot fight back. By using this incident, Gunathilake made the popular program with the title - Uu mata gehuwa, mata uu gehuwa (meaning he hit me, I was hit by him). This catchphrase was highly popularized in Sri Lanka.

His maiden cinema appearance came through 1951 film Banda Nagarayata Paminima directed by Raja Wahab Kashmeer. It was the first film made in a local studio. Then he acted in many supportive comedy roles in popular commercial films such as Pem Mal Mala, Palama Yata, Deviyani Sathya Surakinna, Mana Mohini and Somy Boys.

In 2013, his biography Sadadaraneeya Berty written by Kingsley Wijesundara was launched along with Gunathilake's 89th birthday party at his residence at Godakawela, Kosnathota.

On 13 November 2013, The Ministry of Cultural Affairs conferred the "Desha Nethru" Award at the National Literary Arts Festival. On 12 January 2014, he was honoured with the Lifetime Achievement Award for Service to the Television Industry in the Rupavahini State Awards. In 2021, he was honoured with the lifetime achievement award during the ceremony held for 21 artists who made an invaluable contribution to Sinhala cinema in the early decades of Sinhala Cinema.

== Filmography ==
Year	Film	Roles	Ref.
1952	Banda Nagarayata Paminima	Betel vendor	
1968	Abudassa Kale		
1969	Samaje Sathuro		
1969	Binaramalee		
1970	Lakseta Kodiya	Tamil film director	
1974	Jeewana Ganga		
1975	Sikuruliya	Haramani's friend	
1977	Maruwa Samaga Wase	Deke Kanuwa henchman	
1979	Chuda Manikya	Chuda Manikya carrier	
1980	Sasaraka Pethum		
1981	Kolamkarayo	Member Mahaththaya supporter	
1983	Chandi Siriya		
1983	Samanala Sihina		
1988	Newa Gilunath Ban Chun	Suresh's friend	
1990	Palama Yata	Nanna	
1990	Wana Bambara		
1991	Asai Bayai		
1992	Ranabime Veeraya		
1993	Sandarekha		
1995	Pudumai Eth Aththai		
1995	Deviyani Sathya Surakinna	Minister	
1995	Cheriyo Captain	Partygoer	
1996	Mana Mohini	Sukiri Patillo	
1996	Mal Hathai		
1997	Pem Mal Mala		
1999	Seetha Samire		
2002	Somy Boys	Punyadasa	
2003	Vala In London	Gajasinghe's home servant	
2003	Hitha Honda Pisso	Employer	
