= Vimukthi =

Vimukthi is a Sinhalese given name. Notable people with the name include:

- Nalin Vimukthi (born 1988), Sri Lankan cricketer
- Nimesh Vimukthi (born 1997), Sri Lankan cricketer
- Vimukthi Jayasundara, Sri Lankan film director
- Vimukthi Perera (born 1989), Sri Lankan cricketer

== Media ==
- Vimukthi (film), a 2008 Kannada film directed by P. Sheshadri

== Literature ==
- Vimukthi, Sanskrit term loosely meaning "liberation;" used in Buddhism, Hinduism, and Jainism

== See also ==
- Janatha Vimukthi Peramuna, Sri Lankan Communist political party
