= Daya Wimalaweera =

Sri Lankan director (1937–2019)

Daya Wimalaweera දයා විමලවීර
- Born: December 11, 1937; Grandpass, Sri Lanka
- Died: August 12, 2019 (aged 81); Colombo
- Education: St. Joseph's College, Colombo
- Occupations: Director, cinematographer, producer, screenwriter, editor
- Years active: 1958–2006
- Spouse: Hyacinth Malani Manapperuma
- Children: 3
- Father: Sirisena Wimalaweera
- Relatives: Upasena Wimalaweera (brother); Manel (sister-in-law)

Daya Wimalaweera (born 11 December 1937 – died 12 August 2019 as දයා විමලවීර) [Sinhala]), was a director in Sri Lankan cinema and stage drama. He was also a cinematographer, producer, screenwriter and editor.

== Personal life ==
Daya Wimalaweera was born on 11 December 1937 in Grandpass, Colombo as the third child of the family. His father Sirisena Wimalaweera was a renowned lyricist, screenwriter, producer and filmmaker in Sinhala cinema. His father made many critically acclaimed films in early cinema including Amma, Saradiel, Asoka, Sirakaruwa and Wana Mala. He died on August 24, 1963, at the age of 62.

Daya was educated at St. Joseph's College, Colombo followed by Terence Rajapakse College, Kolonnawa and later Alexandra College, Colombo. He was a bright student at the school, hence his father thought that he would be a doctor one day. However he refused to study medicine and followed in his father's footsteps. However, his father was upset about his work and Daya was joined to his newly established "Nawajeewana" film studio which was established on 13 September 1951. After the iron soldering work at studio, Daya had to work as an assistant laboratory technician and after that in the editing room.

He has two elder sisters - Somawathi and Premawathi; and two younger brothers - Upasena and Ranjith. After the sudden death of mother, the family was take care by stepmother. Upesena Wimalaweera is also a sound engineer and film editor. Upasena was the editor of all films directed by Daya.

Daya was married to Hyacinth Malani and the couple has three daughters. His brother Upasena was married to Kumari's sister Manel. Manel was the lead actress in the 1959 film Ma Ale Kala Tharuniya directed by their father Sirisena Wimalaweera.

Wimalaweera died on 12 August 2019 in a Private Hospital, Colombo at the age of 81. His body was kept at his residence at 154 A, Anderson Road, Dehiwala. Funeral took place on 14 August 2019 at Nedimala Public Cemetery.

== Career ==
During his work at father's new studio, he started to learn editing, lighting and cinematography. His first cinematography teacher was Paul Matthias, the first photographer of the "Nawajeewana" film studio. Prior to that, Matthias was the camera operator of the famous Indian filmmaker Mehboob. After few years, Daya started camera direction of W.A.B. de Silva, who was the first Sri Lankan cameraman in Sinhala cinema. He first handled camera in the film Rodi Kella, even though prior to completing the shooting, his father died. Shortly thereafter, he lost the ownership of "Nawajeewana" film studio.

Wimalaweera entered the cinema as an assistant camera director in the film Ekamath Eka Rataka in his father's film. His maiden camera direction was in 1965 film Adarayay Karunawai directed by Ananda Jayaratne, but first screened film was Patchara in 1964. He was also the cameraman in the original Tamil language film, Thottakkari. Then he was the chief cinematographer for many films such as Kalana Mithuro, Veeduru Gewal, Miringuwa and Sikuruliya.

In 1972, Wimalaweera made his directorial debut with the film Veeduru Gewal where the screenplay by Tissa Abeysekara and based on a detective story. His most popular films include Jeevana Kandulu (1979), Mihidum Sihina (1982), Major Sir (1982), Devduwa (1986), Madhu Sihina (1990), Raja Daruwo (1992), Chaya (1993) and Sujatha (1994). He was the cinematographer in every film he directed except Raja Daruwo. His film Pahai Hathalis Paha was never screened. He becomes one of the most popular filmmakers of the era when the film industry is in a downturn. The dialogue of original 1953 film Sujatha was written by his father. In the re-creation of the film by Daya in 1994, he re-filmed his father's song, Narilatha Pushpe. His 2002 film Seethala Gini Kandu also included a song composed by his father. His 1990 film Madhu Sihina was the last film acted by popular actor Vijaya Kumaratunga. Kumaratunga was assassinated on his way to Colombo after filming.

In 1979, Wimalaweera directed the film Jeewana Kandulu. The film was an adaptation of the novel by same name written by former president Ranasinghe Premadasa. In addition to his directing, he also provided cinematography and lighting for feature films such as Madhu Sihina and Mihidum Sihina.

== Filmography ==
Year	Film	Roles	Ref.
1958	Ekamath Eka Rataka	Assistant cinematographer	
1962	Rodi Kella	never screened	
1964	Patachara	Cinematographer	
1964	Thottakkari	Cinematographer	
1965	Adarayay Karunawai	Cinematographer	
1967	Iwasana Danaa	Cinematographer	
1967	Asikkarai Nambukkarai	Cinematographer	
1968	Mathru Bhoomi	Cinematographer	
1971	Kalana Mithuro	Cinematographer	
1972	Veeduru Gewal	Director, cinematographer, screenwriter	
1972	Miringuwa	Cinematographer	
1975	Sikuruliya	Cinematographer	
1976	Harima Badu Thunak	Cinematographer	
1977	Yali Ipade	Cinematographer	
1979	Hari Pudumai	Cinematographer	
1979	Jeewana Kandulu	Director, cinematographer	
1980	Anuhasa	Cinematographer	
1982	Mihidum Sihina	Director, cinematographer	
1982	Major Sir	Director, cinematographer	
1984	Parasathuro	Cinematographer	
1986	Devduwa	Director, cinematographer	
1990	Madhu Sihina	Director, cinematographer	
1992	Raja Daruwo	Director	
1993	Chaya	Director, cinematographer	
1993	Bambasara Bisaw	Director, cinematographer, screenwriter	
1994	Sujatha	Director, cinematographer, Film Editor	
2002	Seethala Gini Kandu	Director, producer, cinematographer, screenwriter	
2006	Rana Hansi	Director, cinematographer, screenwriter	
