= H. A. Perera =

Sri Lankan actor

H. A. Perera එච්. ඒ. පෙරේරා
- Born: Habarakadage Alosius Perera; 10 May 1950; Balangoda, Sri Lanka
- Died: 4 February 2010 (aged 59); Colombo, Sri Lanka
- Education: De La Salle College; Kotahena Central College
- Occupations: Actor, Director
- Years active: 1973–2007
- Awards: Best Actor

Habarakadage Alosius Perera (10 May 1950 – 4 February 2010 as එච්. ඒ. පෙරේරා), popularly known as H. A. Perera, was an actor in Sri Lankan cinema, theatre, and television.

== Early years ==
Perera was born on 10 May 1950 in Colombo, Sri Lanka as the second child in a family of five. His mother was Palagame Arachchige Mary Theresa and his father was Habarakadage Vincent Perera. He began primary education at Modera St. James's Primary School, where he studied until the second grade. In the third grade he entered De La Salle College, Modara, where he was educated to Ordinary Level. He then entered Kotahena Central College to study for Advanced Level.

Perera died on 4 February 2010, aged 59, in hospital after a brief illness. His remains were kept at the Jayaratna Funeral Parlour from 5 February 2010. The funeral was held at the Madampitiya cemetery in Modera at 5.00 pm on 7 February 2010.

== Career ==
Perera made his way through several higher education schools and completed his studies in London. He first joined the street drama troupe of Gamini Haththettuvagama and made his first stage play Wedikkarayo. In 1973 he joined his first theatrical group. Perera joined Ranga Shilpa Shalika conducted by Dhamma Jagoda at Lionel Wendt Art Centre, to study music but found his career changed to acting.

Rajjiruwo Udai Udai was his first short-stage play. He acted in stage plays such as Bosath Dekma, Raja Dekma, Spartacus, Wedikkarayo, and Julius Caesar. He portrayed Jesus in Niriella's first film, Palamuveniya saha Anthimaya. At the 1981 Youth Drama Awards, Perera won the Best Musical Direction Award for the play Numba Vitarak Thala Eḷaluyi. In 1982, Perera debuted on television with a role in Janelayan A Amutha, subsequently appearing on several other television serials such as Doo Daruwo, Ingammaruwa, Nedeyo, Yaśōrāvaya, Kaḍa Ima, Senehevanthayō, Sūriya Daruvō among others. In 1987, he appeared in Sumitra Peries' Sagara Jalaya Madi Haduwa Oba Hinda. He directed music in Niriella's stage plays and was the first instructor of Jana Karaliya. Perera won Sarasaviya Award for Best Actor for the 1990 film Sagara Jalaya Madi Haduwa. In 1996, he won the State Drama Award for Best Actor for the stage play "Warenthuwa".

== Filmography ==
| Year | Film | Role | Ref. |
|---|---|---|---|
| 1991 | Keli Madala | Poojitha Tennekoon | |
| 1991 | Kulageya | Surrie | |
| 1980 | Sasaraka Pathum | | |
| 1983 | Hasthi Viyaruwa | | |
| 1985 | Rajina | | |
| 1986 | Koti Waligaya | | |
| 1988 | Sagara Jalaya Madi Handuwa Oba Handa | Pina | |
| 1989 | Siri Medura | Gunapala | |
| 1990 | Palama Yata | Rex | |
| 1994 | Meeharaka | Andiris | |
| 1998 | Dehena | | |
| 1998 | Vimukthi | Underworld Thug | |
| 2000 | Indrakeelaya | | |
| 2008 | Siri Raja Siri | Himself | |

=== Selected Television series ===
- Ammai Thaththai
- Ape Aththo
- Doo Daruwo
- Ingammaruwa
- Kada Ima
- Muthu Kirilli
- Nedeyo
- Passe Gena Manamali
- Senehewanthayo
- Suriya Daruwo
- Thara Devi
- Yashorawaya
