= Dilani Abeywardana =

Sri Lankan actress

- ඩිලානි අබේවර්ධන
- Born: Dilani Perera Abeywardana; October 29, 1969 (age 56); Kalubowila, Colombo
- Occupation: Actress
- Years active: 1992–1999
- Spouse: Saman Pushpawarna
- Relatives: Shehan Jayasuriya (son-in-law)

Dilani Perera Abeywardana (born October 29, 1969, as ඩිලානි අබේවර්ධන) [Sinhala]), is a retired actress in Sri Lankan cinema, theater, and television. Starting her career in the 1990s, she is best known for her roles in the films Juriya Mamai, Sujatha, and Chandani.

== Personal life ==
Dilani Abeywardana was born on 29 October 1969 in Kalubowila, Colombo.

She is married to singer Saman Pushpawarna. They currently lives in United States and Dilani works as a beauty consultant in Staten Island.

The couple has one daughter, Kaveesha Kavindi and one son. Kavindi was born on September 12, 1996, in Colombo. Kaveesha made her film debut with 2015 film Singa Machan Charlie directed by Lal Weerasinghe. She has recorded her single in June, Samanalee written by Ananda Padmasiri and composed by Sanjula Himala. Her first song was Mandaram Adure with Kanishka Salinda. Kaveesha is married to Sri Lankan international cricketer Shehan Jayasuriya where the wedding was celebrated on 23 September 2020 in New York, US.

== Acting career ==
Her maiden cinematic experience came through a supportive role in 1988 film Satana, directed by Ananda Wickramasinghe. Since then, she acted many commercially successful films both in dramatic and comedy roles. Some of her popular films are Juriya Mamai, Sujatha, Chandani, Danduwama, Weli Sulanga, Boradiya Pokuna and Pissu Puso.

In 1989, she won the Sarasaviya award for the Best upcoming actress for the maiden role in Satana. Then she won Best actress award in Sarasaviya for Sayanage Sihinaya in 1993 and for Bithu Sithuwam in 1997. In 2003, she won a merit award for the dramatic role in the film Seethala Gini Kandu.

Apart from cinema, Abeywardana acted in few stage plays such as Bima Karanam and Ukussa. She also acted in popular television serials such as Charitha Thunak, Sakisanda Eliyas, and Sabanda Pabilis.

=== Selected television serials ===
- Charitha Thunak
- Indrakeelaya
- Issaraha Gedara
- Kahala Nadaya
- Magi
- Maruk Mal
- Monara Kirilli
- Sabanda Pabilis
- Sakisanda Eliyas
- Senuri
- Sivusiya Gawwa
- Sudu Mal Kanda
- Sujatha
- Thalaya Soyana Geethaya
- Uthurukuru Satana

== Filmography ==
Year	Film	Role	Ref.
1988	Satana		
1990	Hitha Honda Puthek		
1990	Wana Bambara		
1991	Keli Madala	Danushka	
1991	Raja Sellan		
1991	Sisila Giniganee	TV announcer	
1991	Love in Bangkok		
1991	Mama Obe Hithawatha		
1992	Ranabime Veeraya		
1992	Me Ware Mage		
1992	Sayanaye Sihinaya		
1993	Jeewan Malli		
1992	Sinhayangeth Sinhaya	Sandhya	
1992	Sisila Gini Gani	TV announcer	
1993	Weli Sulanga	Kusuma	
1993	Sooraya Veera Chandiyo	Kumari's friend	
1993	Juriya Mamai	Vinitha Ranaweera	
1994	Nohadan Kumariyo		
1994	Sujatha	Shashika Miripana	
1994	Sanda Madala	Achala	
1994	Hello My Darling		
1995	Seilama	Jumbo	
1995	Ira Handa Illa		
1995	Chandani	Shanthi Wickramasinghe	
1995	Deviyani Sathya Surakinna	Jeewani	
1996	Thunweni Aehe		
1996	Mal Hathai		
1996	Bithu Sithuwam		
1997	Goodbye Tokya		
1998	Sagara Peraliya		
1999	Anduru Sewaneli		
1999	Akunu Pahara		
2000	Premila		
2000	Danduwama	Chapa	
2000	Indrakeelaya		
2001	Hai Baby Hai		
2001	Pissu Puso	Sulochana	
2002	Sansara Prarthana		
2002	Pissu Double	Girl in Red Dress	
2002	Seethala Gini Kandu	Rosalyn / Rosy	
2002	Punchi Suranganavi	Nurse Shanika	
2006	Rana Hansi		
2015	Bora Diya Pokuna	Mangala	
