= Manike Attanayake =

Sri Lankan actress (born 1947)

- මැණිකේ අත්තනායක
- Born: Attanayake Mudiyanselage Podi Manike; August 23, 1947 (age 78); Kandy, Sri Lanka
- Education: D. S. Senanayaka College, Kandy; Mahamaya Girls' College, Kandy
- Occupation: Actress
- Years active: 1976–present
- Spouse: Raja Attanayake
- Children: 3

Kala Suri Attanayake Mudiyanselage Podi Manike (born August 23, 1947), popularly known as Manike Attanayake (Sinhala: මැණිකේ අත්තනායක), is an actress in Sri Lankan cinema, theater and television. She is best known for the role in television serial Palingu Manike. In 1987, she was honored with "Kalasuri", becoming the youngest Sri Lankan to win that award.

== Personal life ==
Manike Attanayake was born on 23 August 1947 in Thalwatte, Kandy as the youngest of the family with five siblings. Her father, Wilson Attanayake was a renowned Sokeri actor in Kandy who worked at Cargills Company. Her mother Ran Manike Attanayake was a housewife. Attanayake completed education from Senkadagala Maha Vidyalaya, currently known as D. S. Senanayaka College, Kandy and Mahamaya Girls' College, Kandy. One of her elder sisters, Kumari Manike also acted in many stage dramas.

She is married to retired police officer Raja Attanayake and the couple has two sons and one daughter.

== Acting career ==
Attanayake joined with "Ranga Shilpa Shalika" at Lionel Wendt Art Centre to start stage drama acting. She studied drama and theater under renowned dramatist Dhamma Jagoda, who converted her name into stage name "Manike Attanayake". Her maiden stage drama acting came through Ediriweera Sarachchandra's Maname in 1976. In 1979, Attanayake engaged as an A-grade singer in Sri Lanka Broadcasting Corporation with a versatile range of singing in Noorthi, Nadagam and Classical.

Meanwhile, she started to act in many popular stage plays such as Sarachchandra's Sinhabahu, Lomahansa, Mahasara, Wessanthara, R.R. Samarakoon's Kelani Palama, W.B. Makuloluwa's Depano, Dayananda Gunawardena's Nari Bena, Dikthala Kalagola and Modara Mola. In 1981, Attanayake won the award for Best Actor at State Drama Festival for the role "Paththini" in the play Mini Salamba. In 1987, she was awarded the Kala Suri Award and in 1991, and then the Special Jury Award at the State Theater Festival. She was honored with the title "Moratuputra Abhinandana" award at the "Sahithyangali" Literary Festival held by Moratuwa Municipal Council in 2017 in recognition of her outstanding contribution to the field of stage drama.

She is one of the earliest pillars in Sri Lankan television history. She acted in many popular serials including Palingu Manike, Ella Langa Walawwa, Yashorawaya, Parana Tawuma, Nelli Gedara, Anu Nawayen Nawaya, Mihikathagē Daruvō, Manōmandira, Sandagala Thænna, Nomærena Minissu, Niyaṁ Kurullō and Medi Sina.

Her maiden cinematic experience came through 1981 film Sudda directed by Rathnaweera De Silva. She generally acted in many supportive roles in cinema. Some of her popular films are Niliyakata Pem Kalemi, Seilama, Parliament Jokes, Ridee Nimnaya, Birinda, Mangala Thǣgga, Okkoma Rajavaru, Vana Bambarā, Esaḷa San̆da, Surabidena, Sujāthā, Dhavala Puṣhpaya, Sūra Daruvō, Sathkampā, Saptha Kanyā, Yakaḍa Pihāṭu and Gindarī.

=== Songs ===
- None Mage Sudu None with Sunil Perera
- Ethata Yami Piyabala
- Hunuwataye Kathaya
- Rathdare Siriya Paradana

=== Selected stage dramas ===
- Depano
- Deiyo Sakki
- Dikthala Kalagola
- Lomahansa
- Kelani Palama
- Mahasara
- Manamalaya
- Maname
- Mini Salamba
- Modara Mola
- Nari Bena
- Sinhabahu
- Wessanthara

=== Selected Television serial ===
- Alla Langa Walawwa
- Anu Nawayen Nawaya
- Denuwara Menike
- Deweni Gamana
- Induwari
- Ganga Saha Nissanka
- Kokila Ginna
- Mano Mandira
- Medi Sina
- Mihikathage Daruwo
- Nelli Gedara
- Niyan Kurullo
- Nomerena Minissu
- Palingu Menike
- Parana Tawuma
- Piththala Konderuma
- Ranthaliya Walawwa
- Sandagala Thenna
- Sath Sanda Kirana
- Sende Sakmana
- Sikuru Lanthe
- Sura Vimana
- Thattu Gewal
- Vasudha
- Yashorawaya

== Filmography ==
Year	Film	Role	Ref.
1981	Sudda		
1982	Ridee Nimnaya	Prabha	
1983	Niliyakata Pem Kalemi	Hamu's wife	
1984	Birinda		
1985	Rejina		
1985	Du Daruwo		
1987	Mangala Thegga	Mekhala	
1987	Viragaya	Officer Hamine	
1989	Okkoma Rajawaru		
1989	Waradata Danduwam		
1990	Pem Raja Dahana	Manike	
1990	Wana Bambara		
1991	Asai Bayai		
1991	Esala Sanda		
1993	Surabidena	Midwife	
1993	Saptha Kanya	Mrs. Silva	
1993	Nelum Saha Samanmalee		
1994	Sujatha	Singer	
1994	Dhawala Pushpaya	Matron	
1995	Seilama	Marcus' wife	
1995	Deviyani Sathya Surakinna		
1996	Soora Daruwo		
1997	Duwata Mawaka Misa	Manike Aththanayaka	
2002	Parliament Jokes	Manike	
2002	Sathkampa	Yasawathi	
2003	Yakada Pihatu	Loku Nena	
2005	One Shot	Rani	
2008	Nil Diya Yahana	Shanuka's mother	
2012	Super Six	Julo's mother	
2015	Lantin Singho		
2015	Gindari	Minister's wife	
