= Mervyn Jayathunga =

Sri Lankan actor (1940–1993)

- මර්වින් ජයතුංග
- Born: Pitiyage Mervyn Piyadasa Jayatunga; March 9, 1940; Moratuwa, Sri Lanka
- Died: November 1, 1993 (aged 53); Colombo
- Occupations: Actor, Dramatist
- Years active: 1961–1993
- Spouse: Nalini Hemalatha Weeramanthree
- Children: 2
- Relatives: Ryan Jayathunga (grandson)

Pitiyage Mervyn Piyadasa Jayatunga (Sinhala: මර්වින් ජයතුංග; 9 March 1940 – 1 November 1993), popularly known as Mervyn Jayathunga, was an actor in Sri Lankan cinema and stage drama. He was a highly versatile actor, who popularized villainous roles. Jayathunga acted in several critically acclaimed films, such as Raktha and Pasamithuro.

== Personal life ==
Jayathunga was born on 9 March 1940 in Moratuwa, Sri Lanka (near Colombo), as the eldest of nine siblings. His father, James Jayathunga, was a furniture maker. His mother was Merlin Florida Fernando. He had four brothers—Sumanadasa, Karunadasa, Jinadasa, Nimaladasa—and four sisters—Malani Chandrawathi, Padma Kusumawathi, Ashoka Induwathi, and Bhadra Kanthi.

He started his education at Sri Chandrasekara Maha Vidyalaya, Horethuduwa. At grade 4, he went to Moratu Maha Vidyalaya, where he started studying drama under the guidance of the school principal. He was also a good athlete and a good sitarist. After finishing school, he got a job at Kotuwa Cargo Corporation. Then he worked as a train driver at the Department of Railways. After some years, he started to work as a cartography designer in Department of Survey. He was trained in cartography in Hyderabad, India. He learned martial arts from karate master D.A. Welgama.

He was married to Nalini Hemalatha. She completed her education from Presbyterian Girls' School, Mount Lavinia. The couple had one daughter, Priyadashani Hemali, and one son, Shammie Prabath.

Jayathunga's grandson, Ryan Jayathunga, is also an actor.

== Acting career ==
Initially, Jayathunga was part of an art circle of government service officers. In 1961, he acted in a minor role for the drama Sumudu Bharya. He then joined with drama maestro Henry Jayasena and played in his stage dramas such as Hunuwataye Kathawa, Diriya Mawa, and Apata Puthe Magak Nathe. Under Jayasena's guidance, he acted as a hunter in the television film Elephant Boy.

Jayathunga, who was in charge of Jayasena's stage design, was allowed to go to East Germany to study stage drama. After returning to Sri Lanka, he acted in Gamanak Saha Minihek, Ekadipathi, Sthree, Ran Salakuna, and Kadadasikoti. He was the third Wedi King of the drama Maname by Ediriweera Sarachchandra.

== Filmography ==
Following his stage drama career, Jayathunga was introduced to the silver screen by Wehalle Piyathilaka. His first film acting role was as a music master in Vismaya by Charles Perera. A turning point in his career was the 1977 film Chandi Putha, which established him as a character artist. In 1992, he starred in 17 films, a record at the time in Sri Lankan cinema. On the day he died, he acted in the English television film Fellow Me.

In total, Jayathunga acted in more than 200 films across many genres.

- No. denotes the Number of Sri Lankan film in the Sri Lankan cinema.

| Year | No. | Film | Role | Ref. |
|---|---|---|---|---|
| 1978 | | Vismaya | Music master | |
| 1977 | | Chandi Putha | Mervyn | |
| 1977 | | Pembara Madhu | | |
| 1978 | | Seetha Devi | | |
| 1978 | | Selinahe Walawwa | Simon | |
| 1978 | | Kumara Kumariyo | Finale fighter | |
| 1978 | | Anupama | Bullet | |
| 1979 | | Akke Mata Awasara | Richard Delgoda | |
| 1979 | | Jeewana Kandulu | | |
| 1979 | | Amal Biso | | |
| 1979 | | Chuda Manikya | Seney | |
| 1980 | | Raktha | Gorasinghe | |
| 1980 | | Miyurige Kathawa | | |
| 1981 | | Mihidum Sihina | | |
| 1981 | | Thawalama | | |
| 1981 | | Sooriyakantha | | |
| 1981 | | Sagarayak Meda | Prison bully | |
| 1981 | | Ridee Thella | | |
| 1981 | | Sudda | | |
| 1981 | | Vajira | Shelton | |
| 1981 | | Amme Mata Samawenna | Lionel Jayasekar | |
| 1982 | | Thani Tharuwa | | |
| 1982 | | Pethi Gomara | Vannoka | |
| 1982 | | Sakwithi Suwaya | Pasquel | |
| 1982 | | Anuradha | | |
| 1983 | | Ran Mini Muthu | | |
| 1983 | | Sumithuro | Share demander | |
| 1983 | | Chutte | Kalu Mahththaya | |
| 1983 | | Hasthi Viyaruwa | | |
| 1983 | | Chandira | Gidiriyan | |
| 1983 | | Senehasaka Kandulu | | |
| 1983 | | Pasamithuro | Gemunu | |
| 1983 | | Menik Maliga | | |
| 1983 | | Rathu Makara | Kalu Albert | |
| 1983 | | Bonikka | Bandara Baladeva | |
| 1984 | | Maala Giravi | Wickie | |
| 1984 | | Parasathuro | Aruma | |
| 1984 | | Niwan Dakna Jaathi Dakwa | | |
| 1984 | | Hitha Honda Kollek | | |
| 1984 | | Bambara Patikki | | |
| 1984 | | Hithawathiya | Reggie | |
| 1984 | | Hadawathaka Wedana | | |
| 1984 | | Birinda | | |
| 1984 | | Jaya Sikurui | | |
| 1985 | | Eya Waradida Oba Kiyanna | | |
| 1985 | | Doo Daruwo | | |
| 1985 | | Kirimaduwal | | |
| 1985 | | Mawubima Naththam Maranaya | | |
| 1985 | | Rajina | | |
| 1985 | | Puthuni Mata Samawenna | | |
| 1986 | | Jaya Apatai | | |
| 1986 | | Soora Saradiyel | Saradiel's father | |
| 1986 | | Dinuma | Superintendent Senarath | |
| 1986 | | Prarthana | | |
| 1986 | | Athuru Mithuru | | |
| 1986 | | Dushyanthi | Vijay | |
| 1986 | | Koti Waligaya | | |
| 1987 | | Podi Vijay | | |
| 1987 | | Yukthiyada Shakthiyada | | |
| 1987 | | Kele Kella | Maha Aththo | |
| 1987 | | Der Stein des Todes | | |
| 1987 | | Nommara Ekai | Boss | |
| 1987 | | Randamwal | | |
| 1987 | | Ahinsa | Dulip | |
| 1987 | | Yugayen Yugayata | | |
| 1987 | | Hitha Honda Chandiya | Podi Mahathaya | |
| 1987 | | Obatai Priye Adare | Douglas | |
| 1988 | | Chandingeth Chandiya | | |
| 1988 | | Durga | | |
| 1988 | | Satana | | |
| 1988 | | Ko Hathuro | | |
| 1988 | | Newatha Api Ekwemu | Willie | |
| 1988 | | Amme Oba Nisa | | |
| 1988 | | Angulimala | | |
| 1989 | | Manika, une vie plus tard | Manika's father | |
| 1989 | | Obata Rahasak Kiyannam | | |
| 1989 | | Randenigala Sinhaya | Maha Eka | |
| 1989 | | Nommara 17 | Mervyn Jayasekera | |
| 1989 | | Shakthiya Obai Amme | Albert | |
| 1989 | | Sinasenna Raththaran | | |
| 1989 | | Waradata Danduwama | | |
| 1990 | | Yukthiyata Weda | SP Percy Jayasinghe | |
| 1990 | | Veera Udara | | |
| 1990 | | Hondin Naththam Narakin | | |
| 1990 | | Chandi Raja | | |
| 1990 | | Honda Honda Sellam | Mr. Ranabahu | |
| 1990 | | Dedunnen Samanaliyak | | |
| 1990 | | Pem Rajadahana | | |
| 1990 | | Palama Yata | Guard Mahathaya | |
| 1990 | | Christhu Charithaya | 2nd Herod | |
| 1991 | | Keli Madala | Dudley Tennekoon | |
| 1991 | | Hithata Dukak Nathi Miniha | | |
| 1991 | | Esala Sanda | | |
| 1991 | | Love In Bangkok | | |
| 1991 | | Ran Hadawatha | | |
| 1991 | | Alibaba Saha Hory Hathaliha | | |
| 1991 | | Mama Obe Hithawatha | | |
| 1991 | | Raja Kello | | |
| 1991 | | Raja Sellan | | |
| 1992 | | Jaya Sri We Kumariye | | |
| 1992 | | Bajar Eke Chandiya | | |
| 1992 | | Viyaru Minisa | | |
| 1992 | | Malsara Doni | | |
| 1992 | | Chandi Rejina | | |
| 1992 | | Suranimala | | |
| 1992 | | Sinhayangeth Sinhaya | Mr. Wijetunga | |
| 1992 | | Rajek Wage Puthek | | |
| 1992 | | Ranabime Veeraya | | |
| 1992 | | Sakwithi Raja | | |
| 1992 | | Sakkara Suththara | | |
| 1992 | | Sinha Raja | | |
| 1992 | | Kiyala Wadak Na | Sydney | |
| 1992 | | Okkoma Kanapita | | |
| 1992 | | Me Ware Mage | | |
| 1992 | | Rumathiyay Neethiyay | | |
| 1992 | | Sathya | | |
| 1992 | | Chaya | Maha Eka | |
| 1993 | | Till Death Do Us Part | | |
| 1993 | | Sargent Nallathambi | Balasundara | |
| 1993 | | Sasara Sarisarna Thek Oba Mage | | |
| 1993 | | Yasasa | | |
| 1993 | | Ordinary Magic | Slide Show Man | |
| 1993 | | Lassanai Balanna | | |
| 1993 | | Juriya Mamai | Police SP Sirinandana | |
| 1993 | | Mawila Penevi Roope Hade | | |
| 1993 | | Come O Go Chicago | Mervyn | |
| 1993 | | Sandarekha | | |
| 1993 | | Lagin Giyoth Ehek Na | | |
| 1993 | | Soora Veera Chandiyo | Mervyn | |
| 1994 | | Nohandan Kumariye | | |
| 1994 | | Jayagrahanaya | | |
| 1994 | | Abhiyogaya | | |
| 1994 | | Aathma | | |
| 1994 | | Vijaya Geetha | Sirimanne | |
| 1994 | | Shakthi | | |
| 1994 | | Halo My Darling | | |
| 1995 | | Inspector Geetha | David Ranatunga | |
| 1995 | | Maruthaya | Inspector Palitha | |
| 1995 | | Chandiyage Putha | Nicholas | |
| 1995 | | Hitha Honda Soorayo | | |
| 1995 | | Cheriyo Captain | General Tagore | |
| 1995 | | Wasana Wewa | | |
| 1995 | | Ira Handa Illa | | |
| 1995 | | Pudumai Eth Aththai | | |
| 1995 | | Deviyani Sathya Surakinna | Simon Gajasinghe 'Gini Simon' | |
| 1995 | | Demodara Palama | Patty mahathaya | |
| 1995 | | Ege Wairaya | Silvey | |
| 1995 | | Sudu Walassu | | |
| 1995 | | Dalulana Gini | | |
| 1996 | | Sihina Wimane Kumariya | Herman | |
| 1996 | | Api Baya Naha | Robert Dharmaraj | |
| 1996 | | Body Guard | | |
| 1996 | | Obatai Me Aradhana | | |
| 1996 | | Naralowa Holman | Chief | |
| 1996 | | Raththaran Malli | | |
| 1996 | | Hitha Hondanam Waradin Na | | |
| 1996 | | Bawa Sasara | | |
| 1997 | | Ramba Saha Madhu | | |
| 1997 | | Apaye Thappara 84000k | | |
| 1997 | | Goodbye Tokyo | | |
| 1997 | | Yasoma | | |
| 1997 | | Vijayagrahana | | |
| 1998 | | Girl Friend | | |
| 1999 | | Akunu Pahara | | |
| 2001 | | Dinuma | | |
| 2004 | | Premawanthayo | | |
| 2006 | | Rana Hansi | | |

== Awards ==
=== Presidential Awards ===
| Year | Nominee / work | Award | Result |
|---|---|---|---|
| 1983 | Pasamithuro | Merit award | Won |
