= H. D. Premaratne =

Sri Lankan filmmaker

- Born: Hapuarachchige Don Premaratne; 1944
- Died: 26 December 2005; Colombo, Sri Lanka
- Occupations: Director, Filmmaker, Script Writer, Producer
- Years active: 1967–1994
- Spouse: Chandra Padmini Premaratne
- Children: Rekha Dilani, Ranga Lakmal

H.D. Premaratne (born 1944) was educated at Gurukula Vidyalaya in Kelaniya. He started his film career as a clapper boy in Daru Duka in 1967. While working at the old Times of Ceylon group, he was an Assistant Director for Pujithayo before embarking on his maiden directorial venture Sikuruliya starring Vijaya Kumaranatunga and Swineetha Weerasinghe in 1975.

A majority of his work focused on women and women's issues. Along with cinema, Premaratne produced the teledramas Sandungira Ginigani (1993), Sihina Danauwa (1996), and Dulari (1997) and also the stage drama Yakage Kammala. He worked at Swarnavahini as a Consultant to the Board of Directors, and functioned as the president of the Sri Lanka Cinema Bala Mandalaya.

== Filmography ==
Year	Film	Ref.
1975	Sikuruliya	
1979	Apeksha	
1980	Parithyagaya	
1982	Deveni Gamana	
1986	Aadara Hasuna	
1988	Mangala Thegga	
1990	Saharawe Sihinaya	
1991	Palama Yata	
1992	Kulageya	
1993	Udu Sulanga	
1993	Saptha Kanya	
1993	Seilama	
1994	Visidela	
1999	Mandakini	
2001	Kinihiriya Mal	

== Awards ==
- 1993 Presidential Awards
  - Best Script Writer, Saptha Kanya
- 1985 Sarasaviya Awards
  - Best Script Writer, Dewani Gamana
- 1991 Sarasaviya Awards
  - Best Director, Palama Yata
  - Best Script Writer, Palama Yata – 1991
- 1993 Sarasaviya Awards
  - Best Director, Kula Geya
