= Seilama =

Seilama සෙයිලම
- Directed by: H. D. Premaratne
- Written by: Simon Navagattegama
- Produced by: Soma Edirisinghe
- Starring: Anoja Weerasinghe Ravindra Randeniya Cyril Wickramage
- Cinematography: Andrew Jayamanne
- Edited by: Elmo Halliday
- Music by: Sunil Ariyaratne
- Release date: 1993 (Hawaii International Film Festival)
- Running time: 105 minutes
- Country: Sri Lanka
- Language: Sinhala

Seilama (English: The City) is a Sri Lankan drama film directed by H. D. Premaratne and produced by Soma Edirisinghe for EAP Films. It was released on the international circuit in 1993 and later released in Sri Lanka in 1995.

== Plot ==
Bande (Cyril Wickramage) and wife Siriya (Anoja Weerasinghe) live in a village north of Colombo. They are tenant farmers, reliant on the stability of their landlord. Concurrent with the tenant farming and small businesses in the village, the hunter (Daya Tennekoon), Bande and Siriya's neighbor, grows cannabis in the nearby forest.

The landlord rejects a continuation of the lease, encouraging Bande to go to the city to talk to a government agency representative to understand the legality of this action. On his way back to the village, he gets a ride from Sira (Ravindra Randeniya), a lorry driver working for a timber merchant who comes to the village to transport timber from the forest.

Sira starts making regular visits to the village with other timber workers Simon, the second driver, Wilson, and Justin, the radio lover. Wilson and Justin meet the hunter, who is relaxing, smoking a joint. They realize the quality of the cannabis and Sira broaches a potential smuggling business relationship.

Sira suggests that Bande open a small convenience store, with all goods supplied by Sira, to the objection of the owner of the other store in the village. As Bande, Siriya, and the other villagers start building the store, Sira and his friends come to check on the progress. The friends start drinking and smoking and pass out by nightfall. Sira and Bande leave them as they check out the cannabis field.

Wilson, who had taken notice to Siriya before, wakes up and aggressively follows her around the compound. Siriya hides, but he finds her and rapes her. This sends Siriya into severe depression. Sira visits a couple more times, noticing the change in Siriya's demeanor, while Bande does not understand what has happened to her. Sira figures out what has happened and takes Wilson into the forest to dig a large hole, where Sira kills Wilson and buries his body.

The villagers want to buy everything on credit, but Sira makes it clear that they can't, running the business into the ground. The economic failure and his wife's depression drives Bande to start drinking. Eventually, Bande drunkenly burns down the store and kills himself using the hunter's gun.

Sira offers to take Siriya and her son to the city, and they agree. After meeting Sira's family, the three go to the timber yard, where Sira eventually resigns citing money and business practice differences. Soon thereafter, he rejoins his friend Marcus (W. Jayasiri) and a local prostitute named Jumbo (Dilani Abeywardena) in their old trade—blackmailing rich men.

Siriya is not pleased with this turn in Sira's vocation, but comes to accept it on the condition that he works with her and not Jumbo. Sira does not want Siriya to become a prostitute, but she ignores him and goes to the street to participate in their scheme. She is picked up without Sira's knowledge, and he tries to find her but with no success.

== Cast ==
- Anoja Weerasinghe as Siriya
- Ravindra Randeniya as Sira
- Cyril Wickramage as Bande
- Daya Thennakoon as Hunter
- Elson Divituragama as Timber Dealer
- W. Jayasiri as Marcus
- Dilani Abeywardana as Jumbo
- Granville Rodrigo
- Richard Weerakody
- Chandra Kaluarachchi
- Manike Attanayake
- Pradeep Senanayake
- Dharmadasa Kuruppu
- Gnananga Gunawardena
- Hilda Agnes
- Winnie Wettasinghe

== Soundtrack ==
The following are a list of songs in the order they appear in the film.

Song name	Artist	Language
Me Koi Yanne	Edward Jayakody	Sinhala
Gunguna Rahe Hain Bawre	Mohammed Rafi Asha Bhosle, (Aradhana)	Hindi
Chahe Koi Mujhe Junglee Kahe	Mohammed Rafi, (Junglee)	Hindi
Jaadhi Illai (Salaam Podu)	Malaysia Vasudevan (Kadhal Parisu)	Tamil
Kanne Kalaimane	K. J. Yesudas (Moondram Pirai)	Tamil

== Awards ==
- 1996 Sarasaviya Awards
  - Best Film
