= Yasapalitha Nanayakkara =

Sri Lankan director

Yasapalitha Nanayakkara යසපාලිත නානායක්කාර
- Born: Delgahawatte Yasapalitha Wickramathilaka Nanayakkara; June 19, 1940; Udalamatta, Galle, Sri Lanka
- Died: June 23, 1996 (aged 56)
- Education: Richmond College, Galle
- Occupations: Director, Producer, Screenplay writer, lyricist
- Years active: 1967–1996
- Spouse: Manoshi Perera
- Children: Rajeewa; Harshana
- Parents: Francis Nanayakkara (father); Irene Elizabeth Wijesekara Dissanayake (mother)

Delgahawatte Yasapalitha Wickramathilaka Nanayakkara (born 19 June 1940 – died 23 June 1996 as යසපාලිත නානායක්කාර) [Sinhala]), popularly known as Yasapalitha Nanayakkara, was a director in Sri Lankan cinema and stage drama. He was also a screenwriter, producer, lyricist and actor.

He died on 23 June 1996 at the age of 56.

== Personal life ==
Yasapalitha Nanayakkara was born on 19 June 1940 in Udalamatta village closer to Galle as the second of a family with nine siblings. His father was Francis Nanayakkara and mother was Irene Elizabeth Wijesekara Dissanayake. He started his education from Buddhist Mixed School, Mihiripanna and then from Richmond College, Galle. He has four brothers - Vasudeva, Padmakumara, Hemakumara, Asanga and four younger sisters - Swarna Sakunthala, Ranjani, Lanka and Nilmini. His eldest brother Vasudeva Nanayakkara is a former minister and a member of the parliament. His younger brother Hemakumara Nanayakkara is a former minister and governor of Western Province. Younger brother Padmakumara Nanayakkara is looking after father's business.

He was married to Manoshi Perera and couple has two sons. His brother-in-law Somasiri Alakolanga, who is married to Manoshi's younger sister is also an actor. His elder son, Rajeewa is an actor, screenplay writer, and assistant director. His younger son Harshana also acted in few films and a lawyer by profession and currently serving as the Minister of Justice and National Integration.

== Drama career ==
He had a keen interest on drama since grade 2, where he acted as a newspaper salesman. At Richmond College, he acted in the school drama Hima Kumari Saha Agurumittan Hathdena. Yasapalitha joined Wijaya Abhayadeva as a supporting producer in the film Tissahamila. He was the producer of the film Vasanthi directed by Ananda Wickramasinghe. In that film, he played the role of an arrogant young man.

In 1970, Yasapalitha joined the Chitrasena Kalayathanaya in Kollupitiya and learned the classical music from Titus Nonis, a music teacher. He also directed the popular television serial - Patalawilla.

Yasapalitha's first directorial venture, Thushara, was released in 1973, smashing income records. He also wrote the screenplay for the film. The film was shown in six cinemas for hundred consecutive days. By making fifty days in nineteen cinemas, it earned a large income. He has directed 26 films from 1973 to 1999.

== Legacy ==
On 19 July 2007, there was a mega event to pay homage to the late popular filmmaker Yasapalitha Nanayakkara. The event was titled Rasa Sagarayak was held at the BMICH at 7.00 pm with the participation of Prime Minister Ratnasiri Wickremanayake as Chief Guest jointly coordinated by the Kala Lanka Padanama. In the meantime, his popular films were telecasted on Sirasa TV at 10.30 pm.

== Filmography ==
Year	Film	Roles	Ref.
1967	Vasanthi	Producer, Actor	
1973	Thushara	Director, Screenwriter	
1974	Sahayata Danny	Director, Screenwriter	
1976	Pradeepe Maa Wewa	Director, Screenwriter	
1977	Age Adara Kathawa	Director, Screenwriter	
1979	Geheniyak	Director, Screenwriter	
1979	Monarathanna	Director	
1980	Tak Tik Tuk	Director	
1980	Muwan Pallessa 2	Director	
1981	Geethika	Director, Screenwriter, Producer	
1981	Anjaana	Director	
1982	Newatha Hamuwemu	Director	
1984	Jaya Sikurui	Director, Screenwriter, Producer	
1985	Rosy	Director	
1987	Yukthiyada Shakthiyada	Director, Screenwriter, Producer	
1988	Rasa Rahasak	Director, Screenwriter, Producer	
1990	Dedunnen Samanliyak	Director	
1991	Sihina Ahase Wasanthaya	Director	
1992	Jaya Sri We Kumariye	Director	
1992	Suranimala	Director	
1992	Muwan Palesse Kadira	Director	
1993	Prathigna	Director, Screenwriter, Producer	
1993	Chaya Maya	Director, Producer	
1999	Rathu Aluyama	Director	
