= List of Sri Lankan films of the 1980s =

Films produced in Sri Lanka in the 1980s.

== 1980 ==
Title	Director	Cast	Genre	Notes
1980
Mal Kekulu	Sena Samarasinghe	Gamini Fonseka, Farina Lai, Rex Kodippili, Sriyani Amarasena, Senaka Perera, Bandu Samarasinghe, Wimal Kumara de Costa, Richard Weerakody, Eddie Amarasinghe	Drama Comedy	Released on 4 January.
Uthumanani	Gamini Fonseka	Gamini Fonseka, Sonia Disa, Somy Rathnayake, Farina Lai, Shanthi Lekha, Karunaratne Hangawatte, Richard Weerakody, Tony Ranasinghe, Daya Alwis	Drama Action	Released on 25 January.
Tak Tik Tuk	Yasapalitha Nanayakkara	Vijaya Kumaratunga, Sonia Disa, Senadheera Rupasinghe, Dommie Jayawardena, Joe Abeywickrama, Eddie Junior, Rukmani Devi, Anoja Weerasinghe	Drama Romance	Released on 1 February.
Jodu Walalu	Pathiraja L.S. Dayananda	Joe Abeywickrama, Sumana Amarasinghe, Sriyani Fonseka, Lambert Moramudali, Wilson Karu, U. Ariyawimal, Daya Alwis, Raja Sumanapala	Drama Thriller	Released on 8 February.
Kanchana	T. M. Sangadasa	Wally Nanayakkara, Vijaya Kumaratunga, Sriyani Amarasena, Nadeeka Gunasekara, Amarasiri Kalansuriya, Daya Thennakoon, Wimal Kumara de Costa	Romance	Released on 22 February.
Silva	Herbert Ranjith Peiris	Wimal Kumara de Costa, Roy de Silva, Malini Fonseka, Samanthi Lanerolle, J. B. L. Gunasekera, Sumana Amarasinghe, Ranjith Suranga, Rukmani Devi	Comedy Drama	Released on 7 March.
Ek Tem Ge	Herbert Ranjith Peiris	Joe Abeywickrema, Ravindra Randeniya, Malini Fonseka, Wimal Kumara de Costa, Shanthi Lekha, Dharmadasa Kuruppu, Tony Ranasinghe	Drama Thriller	Released on 22 March.
Anuhasa	H. E. Jayasinghe	Sonia Disa, Pearl Cooray, Kusum Perera, Wimala Kumari, Denawaka Hamine, Anthony C. Perera, Piyadasa Wijekoon, B. S. Perera, Eddie Jayamanne	Drama	Released on 1 April.
Seetha	Shirley P. Wijerathne	Joe Abeywickrama, Stanley Perera, Rex Kodippili, B. S. Perera, Nawanandana Wijesinghe, Agra Sajivani, Manel Wanaguru, Hugo Fernando	Drama	Released on 4 April.
Aadara Rathne	K.A.W. Perera	Roy de Silva, Sonia Disa, Upali Attanayake, Joe Abeywickrama, B. S. Perera, Herbert Amarawickrama, Freddie Silva, Samanthi Lanerolle	Drama	Released on 11 April.
Doctor Susantha	Dayananda Gunawardena	Sonia Disa, Alexander Fernando, Piyaratne M. Senarath, Manel Wanaguru, Vincent Vaas, Shanthi Lekha, Don Sirisena, Pujitha Mendis	Drama	Released on 2 May.
Siribo Aiya	Sunil Ariyaratne	Joe Abeywickrema, Geetha Kumarasinghe, Vasanthi Chathurani, Somalatha Subasinghe, Somasiri Dehipitiya, D. R. Nanayakkara, Daya Alwis	Drama	Released on 16 May.
Raktha	Gamini Hewavitharana	Malini Fonseka, Robin Fernando, Rex Kodippili, Sonia Disa, Alexander Fernando, Wimal Kumara de Costa, Mervyn Jayathunga, Manel Wanaguru	Thriller	Released on 30 May.
Sasaraka Pethum	H. D. Premaratne	Tony Ranasinghe, Suvineetha Weerasinghe, Robin Fernando, Ranjan Mendis, Beula Dias, Ajith Jinadasa, Shanthi Lekha, Piyadasa Gunasekera	Drama	Released on 30 May.
Parithyagaya	H.D. Premaratne	Tony Ranasinghe, Sriyani Amarasena, Amarasiri Kalansooriya, Vasanthi Chathurani, Somasiri Dehipitiya, Vincent Vaas, Denawaka Hamine	Drama	Released on 17 June.
Bambara Pahasa	Siri Kularathne	Tony Ranasinghe, Sriyani Amarasena, Joe Abeywickrama, Mark Samaranayake, Sriyani Fonseka, Freddie Silva, Jayasekara Aponsu	Drama	Released on 28 June 1980
Dandu Monara	Vijaya Dharma Sri	Joe Abeywickrama, Malini Fonseka, Udaya Kumara Senarath Yapa, Chandra Kaluarachchi, Lucien Bulathsinhala, Somy Rathnayake, Samanthi Lanerolle	Drama	Released on 11 July.
Ganga Addara	Sumitra Peries	Vijaya Kumaratunga, Vasanthi Chathurani, Sanath Gunathilake, Tony Ranasinghe, Henry Jayasena, Leena de Silva, Shanthi Lekha	Romantic Drama	Released on 1 August.
Karumakkarayo	Tissa Abeysekara	Vijaya Kumaratunga, Geetha Kumarasinghe, Somasiri Dehipitiya, Upali Attanayake, G. R. Perera, U. Ariyawimal, Cyril Wickramage, Daya Alwis	Drama Thriller	Released on 8 August.
Sankapali	Sarath Rupasinghe; Anton Gregory	Gamini Fonseka, Robin Fernando, Swarna Mallawarachchi, Rex Kodippili, Shanthi Lekha, Eddie Jayamanne, Rinsley Weeraratne, Somy Rathnayake	Drama	Released on 22 August.
Muwan Pelessa 2	Yasapalitha Nanayakkara	Sriyani Amarasena, Rex Kodippili, Joe Abeywickrama, Robin Fernando, Hugo Fernando, Gemunu Wijesuriya, Freddie Silva, Rathnawali Kekunawela	Comedy Drama	Released on 22 August.
Raja Dawasak	Timothy Weerarathne	Vijaya Kumaratunga, Malini Fonseka, Piyadasa Gunasekera, Ravindra Randeniya, Tudor Karunathilake, Shanthi Lekha, Eddie Junior, Don Sirisena	Satire	Released on 22 August.
Hewaneli Eda Minissu	Parakrama de Silva	Dharmasiri Bandaranayake, Vasanthi Chathurani, Tony Ranasinghe, Swarna Mallawarachchi, Menik Kurukulasuriya, Gnananga Gunawardena, Simon Navagattegama	Drama	Released on 3 October.
Mage Amma	K. Venket	Vijaya Nandasiri, Sriyani Amarasena, Anushka Madiwaka, Rex Kodippili, Rohini Jayakody, Freddie Silva, Don Sirisena, B. S. Perera	Drama	Released on 10 October.
Hansa Vilak	Dharmasiri Bandaranayake	Dharmasiri Bandaranayake, Swarna Mallawarachchi, Henry Jayasena, Vasanthi Chathurani, G. W. Surendra, J. H. Jayawardena, Denawaka Hamine	Drama	Released on 24 October.
Paara Dige	Dharmasena Pathiraja	Vijaya Kumaratunga, Indira Abeysena, Vasanthi Chathurani, Joe Abeywickrama, Wimal Kumara de Costa, Daya Thennakoon, Denawaka Hamine	Drama	Released on 24 October.
Sabeetha	J. Selvarathnam	Sabeetha Perera, Jagath Rohan, Lionel Deraniyagala, Indrani Abeywardena, Vijaya Nandasiri, Manel Wanaguru, Agra Sajivani, Seetha Kumari	Action Drama	Released on 7 November.
Sinhabahu	Pathiraja L.S. Dayananda	Joe Abeywickrama, Swarna Mallawarachchi, Amarasiri Kalansooriya, Nadeeka Gunasekara, Piyasena Ahangama, Upali Attanayake, Nihal Silva, Rukmani Devi	Drama	Released on 22 November.
Hondin Inna	Bandhu Gunasekara	Senadheera Rupasinghe, Vijitha Mallika, Hugo Fernando, Anthony C. Perera, Pitipana Silva, Alexander Fernando, Eddie Junior, Bandu Munasinghe	Romance	Released on 5 December.
Api Dedena	Meril Albert	Tissa Wijesurendra, Geetha Kumarasinghe, Jenita Samaraweera, Wimal Kumara de Costa, Shanthi Lekha, B. S. Perera, Piyadasa Wijekoon	Romance	Released on 5 December.
Miyurige Kathawa	Gamini Fonseka	Gamini Fonseka, Veena Jayakody, Tony Ranasinghe, Shirani Nugera, Somy Rathnayake, Shanthi Lekha, Wimal Kumara de Costa, Dharma Sri Munasinghe	Drama	Released on 19 December.
Kinduru Kumari	Sunil Ariyaratne	Robin Fernando, Vijaya Kumaratunga, Jenita Samaraweera, Sisira Kumarasinghe, Denawaka Hamine, Wilson Karu, Vijaya Nandasiri, Nellie Fernando	Drama Action	Released on 26 December.

== 1981 ==
Title	Director	Cast	Genre	Notes
1981
Ran Ethana	Herbert M. Seneviratne	Tony Ranasinghe, Ruby de Mel, Dharma Sri Munasinghe, Wickrama Bogoda, Herbert M. Seneviratne, Ranjith Perera	Drama	Released on 9 January.
Kolamkarayo	Sunil Ariyaratne; Tissa Nagodavithana	Joe Abeywickrama, Geetha Kumarasinghe, Anthony C. Perera, Wimal Kumara de Costa, Freddie Silva, Don Sirisena, Pearl Vasudevi, Hugo Fernando	Comedy	Released on 9 January.
Thavalama	Lal Perera	Gamini Fonseka, Ravindra Randeniya, Veena Jayakody, Farina Lai, Shanthi Lekha, Dharma Sri Munasinghe, Somy Rathnayake, Eddie Jayamanne	Drama	Released on 23 January.
Ranga	D. Mariadasan	Ravindra Randeniya, Joe Abeywickrama, Jenita Samaraweera, Geetha Kumarasinghe, Rex Kodippili, Sriyani Amarasena, Shanthi Lekha, Wimal Kumara de Costa	Drama	Released on 30 January.
Beddegama	Lester James Peries	Joe Abeywickrama, Vijaya Kumaranatunga, Malini Fonseka, Henry Jayasena, Nadeeka Gunasekara, D. R. Nanayakkara, Tony Ranasinghe	Drama	Released on 20 February.
Sathweni Dawasa	Hemasiri Sellapperuma	Sanath Gunathilake, Malini Fonseka, Freddie Silva, Ravindra Randeniya, Sonia Disa, Piyasena Ahangama, Wimal Kumara de Costa, Wilson Karu	Romance	Released on 20 February.
Sayuru Thera	Nimal Silva	Joe Abeywickrama, Malini Fonseka, Tony Ranasinghe, Wimal Kumara de Costa, Shanthi Lekha, Pitipana Silva, Jayasekara Aponsu	Drama	Released on 6 March.
Valampuri	Bermin Laili Fernando	Vijaya Kumaranatunga, Geetha Kumarasinghe, Tony Ranasinghe, Somy Rathnayake, Leena de Silva, Somasiri Dehipitiya, Piyadasa Wijekoon	Drama Romance	Released on 14 March.
Bamba Ketu Hati	Sunil Ariyaratne	Ravindra Randeniya, Malini Fonseka, Dharmasiri Bandaranayake, Jenita Samaraweera, Robin Fernando, Rukmani Devi, Sumana Amarasinghe, Menik Kurukulasuriya	Drama	Released on 21 March.
Soldadu Unnahe	Dharmasena Pathiraja	Joe Abeywickrama, Malini Fonseka, Henry Jayasena, Neil Alles, Cyril Wickramage, Daya Thennakoon, Chris Greet, Rathmalie Gunasekera	Thriller	Released on 10 April.
Ajasaththa	Joe Michael	Oswald Jayasinghe, Sumana Amarasinghe, Agra Sajivani, Aruna Shanthi, Tissa Udangamuwa, Piyadasa Gunasekera, Mark Samaranayake, Susila Kuragama	Thriller	Released on 10 April.
Situ Kumariyo	Vijaya Dharma Sri	Sanath Gunathilake, Malini Fonseka, Upali Attanayake, Wimal Kumara de Costa, J. B. L. Gunasekera, Samanthi Lanerolle, Rathna Sumanapala	Drama	Released on 2 May.
Sathara Pera Nimithi	Sunil Ariyaratne	Neil Alles, Dharmasiri Bandaranayake, Jenita Samaraweera, Joe Abeywickrama, Sriyani Amarasena, Chandi Rasika, Gamini Samarakoon, Bandula Vithanage	Thriller	Released on 15 May.
Eka Dawasak Re	Amaranath Jayathilake	Ravindra Randeniya, Farina Lai, Kusum Renu, Robin Fernando, Chandralal Jayawardena, Vijaya Nandasiri, Freddie Silva, Piyadasa Wijekoon	Romance	Released on 29 May.
Vajira	Sunil Ariyaratne	Amarasiri Kalansuriya, Nadeeka Gunasekara, Mervyn Jayathunga, Menik Kurukulasuriya, Gothami Pathiraja, Sanath Gunathilake, Somasiri Dehipitiya	Drama	Released on 9 June.
Senasuma	W. Wilfred Silva	Sriyani Amarasena, Roy de Silva, Sumana Amarasinghe, Asoka Ponnamperuma, Rukmani Devi, Lilian Edirisinghe, Herbert Amarawickrama	Drama	Released on 12 June.
Suriyakantha	Vijaya Dharma Sri	Vijaya Kumaranatunga, Nita Fernando, Sriyani Amarasena, Henry Jayasena, Mervyn Jayathunga, Samanthi Lanerolle, Seetha Kumari	Drama	Released on 3 July.
Amme Mata Samawenna	W. Wilfred Silva	Anushka Madiwaka, Sanath Gunathilake, Sonia Disa, Mervyn Jayathunga, Vijaya Nandasiri, Samanthi Lanerolle, Freddie Silva, Piyadasa Wijekoon	Drama	Released on 10 July.
Sagarayak Meda	Gamini Fonseka	Gamini Fonseka, Kamal Addaraarachchi, Veena Jayakody, Ian Wickramanayake, Amarasiri Kalansuriya, Mervyn Jayathunga, Anushka Madiwaka, Karunaratne Hangawatte	Drama Action	Released on 17 July.
Sathkulu Pauwa	Kandapola Kumaratunga	Sanath Gunathilake, Anushka Madiwaka, Gothami Pathiraja, Lionel Deraniyagala, B. S. Perera, Chitra Wakishta, Chandrapala Wijesooriya	Drama Romance	Released on 24 July.
Ridee Thella	Siri Kularatne	Gamini Fonseka, Ravindra Randeniya, Sriyani Amarasena, Lionel Deraniyagala, Rathmalie Gunasekera, Mervyn Jayathunga, Somy Rathnayake, Jayasekara Aponsu	Drama Action	Released on 21 August.
Bandura Mal	Gamini Fonseka	Gamini Fonseka, Veena Jayakody, Tony Ranasinghe, Somy Rathnayake, Dharma Sri Munasinghe, Veena Jayakody, Shanthi Lekha, B. S. Perera	Drama	Released on 28 August.
Geethika	Yasapalitha Nanayakkara	Vijaya Kumaranatunga, Malini Fonseka, Anoja Weerasinghe, Wimal Kumara de Costa, Freddie Silva, Mark Samaranayake, Denawaka Hamine	Romance	Released on 4 September.
Dayabara Nilu	Kandapola Kumaratunga	Karunaratne Hangawatte, Kanthi Lanka, Swarna Kahawita, Jayasekara Aponsu, Lionel Deraniyagala, Chandrapala Wijesooriya, Rita Ratnayake, B. S. Perera	Romantic Drama	Released on 2 October.
Anjaana	Yasapalitha Nanayakkara	Vijaya Kumaranatunga, Geetha Kumarasinghe, Swarna Mallawarachchi, Robin Fernando, Freddie Silva, Mark Samaranayake, Wijeratne Warakagoda	Drama	Released on 4 October.
Induta Mal Mitak	Sugathapala Senarath Yapa	Malini Fonseka, Ravindra Randeniya, Dhammi Fonseka, Upali Attanayake, Edmond Jayasinghe, Agnes Sirisena, Rathna Sumanapala, Raja Sumanapala	Romance	Released on 16 October.
Sathara Diganthaya	Sathischandra Edirisinghe	Joe Abeywickrama, Ravindra Randeniya, Geetha Kumarasinghe, Rukmani Devi, Wimal Kumara de Costa, Somy Rathnayake, Somasiri Dehipitiya, Denawaka Hamine	Drama	Released on 16 October.
Hodama Naluwa	Sherly P. Wijerathna	Vijaya Kumaratunga, Sumana Amarasinghe, Geetha Kumarasinghe, Rukmani Devi, Dayananda Jayawardena, Jeevan Kumaratunga, B. S. Perera	Drama	Released on 30 October.
Jeewanthi	Hemasiri Sellapperuma	Sonia Disa, Tissa Wijesurendra, Sudesh Gunaratne, Jenita Samaraweera, Rex Kodippili, David Dharmakeerthi, Don Sirisena, B. S. Perera	Romance	Released on 7 November.
Aradhana	Vijaya Dharma Sri	Malini Fonseka, Ravindra Randeniya, Anoja Weerasinghe, Sanath Gunathilake, David Dharmakeerthi, Wijeratne Warakagoda, Lucien Bulathsinhala	Drama	Released on 13 November.
Bangali Walalu	K. A. W. Perera	Sabeetha Perera, Jayantha Das Perera, Vijaya Nandasiri, D. R. Nanayakkara, Sonia Disa, Herbert Amarawickrama, Leticia Peiris	Drama	Released on 27 November.
Sudda	Rathnaweera De Silva	Mervyn Jayathunga, B. S. Perera, Linton Semage, Granville Rodrigo, Manike Attanayake, Samanthi Lanerolle, Mahendra Peiris, Latha Abeywardana	Drama	Released on 11 December.
Samawenna	Milton Jayawardena	Vasanthi Chathurani, Tony Ranasinghe, Ananda Wickramage, Felix Premawardhana, Shirani Nugera, Rita Ratnayake, Ruby de Mel, Somasiri Dehipitiya	Drama	Released on 11 December.
Chanchala Rekha	Sena Samarasinghe	Gamini Fonseka, Nadeeka Gunasekara, Bandu Samarasinghe, Rex Kodippili, Wimal Kumara de Costa, Swarna Mallawarachchi, Thalatha Gunasekara	Drama	Released on 18 December.
Saranga	Gamini Hewawitharana	Sanath Gunathilake, Anoja Weerasinghe, Douglas Ranasinghe, Jeevan Kumaratunga, Shirani Nugera, Leena de Silva, Jayalath Manoratne, Nihal Silva	Drama Action	Released on 18 December.

== 1982 ==
Title	Director	Cast	Genre	Notes
1982
Mihidum Sihina	Daya Wimalaweera	Vijaya Kumaranatunga, Malini Fonseka, Sumana Amarasinghe, Roy de Silva, Denawaka Hamine, Mervyn Jayathunga, Don Sirisena, Bandu Samarasinghe	Thriller	Released on 6 January.
Sanda	Stanley Perera	Sabeetha Perera, Ravindra Randeniya, Robin Fernando, Wimal Kumara de Costa, Lilian Edirisinghe, Girley Gunawardana	Drama	Released on 22 January.
Maha Gedara	Tissa Abeysekara	Vijaya Kumaranatunga, Geetha Kumarasinghe, Sriyani Amarasena, Somalatha Subasinghe, Tissa Abeysekara, Dhamma Jagoda, Daya Alwis	Drama	Released on 29 January.
Thana Giravi	Roy de Silva	Sumana Amarasinghe, Joe Abeywickrama, Henry Jayasena, Upali Attanayake, Menik Kurukulasuriya, Iranganie Serasinghe, H. R. Jothipala	Drama	Released on 29 January.
Bambara Geethaya	Sunil Ariyaratne	Malini Fonseka, Ravindra Randeniya, Robin Fernando, Denawaka Hamine, Jenita Samaraweera, Wilson Karu	Thriller	Released on 5 February.
Re Manamali	Gamini Fonseka	Tony Ranasinghe, Ravindra Randeniya, Veena Jayakody, Anthony C. Perera, Dharma Sri Munasinghe, Shanthi Lekha, Wimal Kumara de Costa	Drama	Released on 19 February.
Yasa Isuru	Dharmasiri Gamage	Vijaya Kumaranatunga, Malini Fonseka, Amarasiri Kalansooriya, Gothami Pathiraja, Vijaya Nandasiri, Miyuri Samarasinghe, Don Sirisena	Drama	Released on 5 March.
Sakvithi Suvaya	Gamini Fonseka	Gamini Fonseka, Amarasiri Kalansooriya, Vijaya Kumaratunga, Sabeetha Perera, Somy Rathnayake, Senaka Perera, Shanthi Lekha	Thriller	Released on 5 March.
Bicycley	Danny W. Pathirana	Rex Kodippili, Vijaya Kumaratunga, Wimal Kumara de Costa, Jenita Samaraweera, Ajith Jinadasa, Nihal Silva, Wilson Karu	Action	Released on 19 March.
Adhishtanaya	Sathischandra Edirisinghe	Sugath Samarakoon, Nadeeka Gunasekara, Nawanandana Wijesinghe, J. H. Jayawardena, Lloyd Wakista, Raja Sumanapala, Rathna Sumanapala	Thriller	Released on 19 March.
Thani Tharuwa	Rathnaweera De Silva	Sanath Gunathilake, Gothami Pathiraja, Menik Kurukulasuriya, Jeevan Kumaratunga, Mervyn Jayathunga, Ranjith PeirisThalatha Gunasekara	Drama	Released on 26 March.
Sudu Ayya	S.V. Chandran	Jenita Samaraweera, Shanthi Lekha, Manel Wanaguru, Rukmani Devi, B. S. Perera, Rex Kodippili, Don Sirisena, Eddie Junior	Drama	Released on 10 April.
Ayachana	Milton Jayawardena	Vasanthi Chathurani, Ananda Wickramage, Upali Attanayake, Ruby de Mel, Kithsiri Perera, Milton Jayawardena, Sriya Kalubowila	Drama	Released on 10 April.
Pethi Gomara	Siri Kularatne	Tony Ranasinghe, Sriyani Amarasena, Mervyn Jayathunga, Sumana Amarasinghe, Jayasekara Aponsu, Denawaka Hamine, Seetha Kumari	Drama	Released on 30 April.
Eka Diga Kathawak	Sri Nihal Jayasinghe	Baptist Fernando, Jenita Samaraweera, Rex Kodippili, Freddie Silva, B. S. Perera, Don Sirisena, Piyadasa Wijekoon	Drama Comedy	Released on 8 May.
Sanasanna Maa	Vinsant Senavirathna	Sabeetha Perera, Seyin Zuher, Jagath Rohan, Teddy Vidyalankara, Dayananda Jayawardane, Seetha Kumari, Vishaka Siriwardana	Drama	Released on 21 May.
Anuradha	Siri Kularatne	Malini Fonseka, Edmund Jayasinghe, Jayasekara Aponsu, Lionel Deraniyagala, Mervyn Jayathunga, Dayananda Jayawardena, Wilson Karu	Drama	Released on 4 June.
Rahasak Nathi Rahasak	M. V. Balan	Vijaya Kumaranatunga, Sriyani Amarasena, Robin Fernando, Manel Wanaguru, Sonia Disa, Alexander Fernando, Sumana Amarasinghe	Drama Romance	Released on 18 June.
Jeevithayen Jeevithayak	Sunil Ariyaratne	Wimal Kumara de Costa, Sriyani Amarasena, Robin Fernando, Farina Lai, Manel Wanaguru, Pearl Vasudevi, Wilson Karu	Drama	Released on 18 June.
Ridee Nimnaya	D. B. Nihalsinghe	Sanath Gunathilake, Swarna Mallawarachchi, Nadeeka Gunasekara, Shanthi Lekha, Somasiri Dehipitiya, Neil Alles, Geetha Kanthi Jayakody	Drama	Released on 9 July.
Pradeepaa	Asoka Ponnamperuma	Amarasiri Kalansooriya, Asoka Ponnamperuma, Rathmalie Gunasekera, Nihal Silva, Agnes Sirisena, Alfred Edirimanne, Shanthi Lekha	Drama	Released on 23 July.
Wathura Karaththaya	K. A. W. Perera	Jayantha Das Perera, Joe Abeywickrama, Sonia Disa, Somy Rathnayake, Herbert Amarawickrama, Leticia Peiris, Freddie Silva	Thriller	Released on 24 July.
Kiri Suwanda	Anton Gregory	Vijaya Kumaranatunga, Geetha Kumarasinghe, Sanath Gunathilake, Tissa Wijesurendra, Sabeetha Perera, Leena de Silva, Sanath Gunathilake	Drama	Released on 30 July.
Sithara	S. V. Chandran	Tissa Wijesurendra, Geetha Kumarasinghe, Nadeeka Gunasekara, Rukmani Devi, B. S. Perera, Eddie Jayamanne, Wimal Kumara de Costa	Romance	Released on 30 July.
Hello Shyama	M. S. Ananda	Shyama Anandan, Gamini Fonseka, Bandu Samarasinghe, Senaka Perera, Kanthi Lanka, Dudley Wanaguru, Ruby de Mel, Sriyani Amarasena	Comedy Action	Released on 13 August.
Situ Diyaniya	Herbert M. Seneviratne	Lucien Bulathsinhala, Sriyani Amarasena, Palika Dilrukshi, Gothami Pathiraja, Herbert M. Seneviratne, Nihal Silva	Drama	Released on 14 August.
Thakkita Tharikita	Anthony C. Perera	Vijaya Kumaranatunga, Geetha Kumarasinghe, Anthony C, Perera, Sonia Disa, Hugo Fernando, Don Sirisena, B. S. Perera	Comedy	Released on 20 August.
Major Sir	Daya Wimalaweera	Joe Abeywickrama, Geetha Kumarasinghe, Tissa Wijesurendra, Denawaka Hamine, Wimal Kumara de Costa, Freddie Silva, Nawanandana Wijesinghe	Drama	Released on 10 September.
Chathu Madhura	Somapala Lanerolle	Anushka Madiwaka, Samanthi Lanerolle, Anura Medagoda, Sanath Gunathilake, Shanthi Lekha, Kumudumali de Silva, Lilian Edirisinghe	Drama	Released on 24 September.
Kele Mal	Sunil Ariyaratne	Sanath Gunathilake, Anoja Weerasinghe, Swarna Mallawarachchi, Douglas Ranasinghe, Sanath Gunathilake, Leena de Silva	Drama	Released on 24 September.
Malata Noena Bambaru	Shelton Payagala; Chandrarathna Mapitigama	Joe Abeywickrama, Ajith Jinadasa, Suvineetha Weerasinghe, Tony Ranasinghe, Wijeratne Warakagoda, Ranjith Dayananda, Gamini Samarakoon	Drama	Released on 29 October.
Paramitha	Anton Gregory	Vijaya Kumaratunga, Ravindra Randeniya, Sabeetha Perera, Sriyani Amarasena, Kamal Addararachchi, Menik Kurukulasuriya, D. R. Nanayakkara	Romance	Released on 5 November.
Biththi Hathara	Parakrama de Silva	Neil Alles, Vasanthi Chathurani, Swarna Mallawarachchi, Menik Kurukulasuriya, Piyasena Ahangama, Nadeeka Gunasekara, Rathnawali Kekunawela	Drama	Released on 5 November.
Miss Mallika	Anton Gregory	Gamini Fonseka, Veena Jayakody, Somy Rathnayake, Sonia Disa, Gothami Pathiraja, Freddie Silva, Piyadasa Gunasekera, Shirani Nugera	Drama	Released on 12 November.
Nawatha Hamu Wemu	Yasapalitha Nanayakkara	Vijaya Kumaranatunga, Malini Fonseka, Sabeetha Perera, Sanath Gunathilake, Jeevan Kumaratunga, Piyadasa Wijekoon, Edna Sugathapala	Romance	Released on 12 November.
Rail Para	K. A. W. Perera	Joe Abeywickrama, Sonia Disa, Jayantha Das Perera, Jenita Samaraweera, Vijaya Nandasiri, Leticia Peiris, Herbert Amarawickrama	Drama	Released on 10 December.
Piya Saha Daruwo	Sugathapala Senarath Yapa	Joe Abeywickrama, Malani Fonseka, Ranjith Suranga, Nissanka Diddeniya, Mervyn Jayathunga, Denawaka Hamine	Drama	Released on 15 December.
Yahalu Yeheli	Sumitra Peries	Swarna Mallawarachchi, Sanath Gunathilake, Sriyani Amarasena, Tony Ranasinghe. Nadeeka Gunasekara, Somasiri Dehipitiya, Leena de Silva	Drama	Released on 24 December.
Kadawunu Poronnduwa remake	Roy de Silva	Joe Abeywickrama, Vijaya Kumaratunga, Sumana Amarasinghe, Ruby de Mel, Eddie Jayamanne, Mabel Blythe, Sonia Disa	Drama	Released on 24 December.

== 1983 ==
Title	Director	Cast	Genre	Notes
1983
Sasara Wasana Thuru	Sena Rupasingha	Piyadasa Wijekoon, Eric Milton, Chandima Hewapthirana, Rathnapala Dharmasiri, M. M. H. Haq, Pujitha Mendis	Drama	Released on 14 January.
Ran Mini Muthu	Wilfred Silva	Joe Abeywickrama, Sriyani Amarasena, Ravindra Randeniya, Jenita Samaraweera, Vijaya Nandasiri, B. S. Perera, Sonia Disa, Vincent Vaas	Drama	Released on 19 January.
Chandira	Danny W. Pathirana	Sabeetha Perera, Rex Kodippili, Sriyani Amarasena, Mervyn Jayathunga, Wimal Kumara de Costa, Tyrone Michael, Richard Weerakody	Thriller	Released on 21 January.
Sandamali	Milton Jayawardena	Suvineetha Weerasinghe, Tony Ranasinghe, Joe Abeywickrama, Agra Sajivani, Hugo Fernando, Don Sirisena, Vijaya Kumaratunga, Eddie Jayamanne	Drama	Released on 29 January.
Sumithuro	Roy de Silva	H. R. Jothipala, Sumana Amarasinghe, Joe Abeywickrama, Freddie Silva, Lionel Deraniyagala, Somasiri Dehipitiya, Samanthi Lanerolle	Drama	Released on 12 February.
Kaliyugaya	Lester James Peiris	Punya Heendeniya, Henry Jayasena, Wickrama Bogoda, Trilicia Gunawardena, Sanath Gunathilake, Anoja Weerasinghe, Tony Ranasinghe	Drama	Released on 4 March.
Yali Pipunu Malak	Anton Gregory	Ravindra Randeniya, Geetha Kumarasinghe, Anthony C. Perera, Eddie Jayamanne, Shanthi Lekha, Cletus Mendis, Jenita Samaraweera	Romance	Released on 4 March.
Siv Ranga Sena	Bermin Lyle Fernando	Sanath Gunathilake, Geetha Kumarasinghe, Douglas Ranasinghe, Sanath Gunathilake, Sabeetha Perera, Nadeeka Gunasekara, Wimal Kumara de Costa, Ranjith Peiris	Drama	Released on 4 March.
Niliyakata Pem Kalemi	Siri Kularathne	Sriyani Amarasena, Joe Abeywickrama, Somy Rathnayake, Hemasiri Liyanage, Somasiri Dehipitiya, Farina Lai, Vincent Vaas	Drama	Released on 18 March.
Samuganimi Ma Samiyani	Premaweera Gunasekara; Hilary Rajapakse	Joe Abeywickrama, Tony Ranasinghe, Malini Fonseka, Somy Rathnayake, Ajith Jinadasa, Agnes Sirisena, Thalatha Gunasekara	Thriller	Released on 1 April.
Chandi Siriya	Rohini Jayakody	Rohini Jayakody, B. S. Perera, Freddie Silva, Lilian Edirisinghe, Samanthi Lanerolle, Rex Kodippili, Agra Sajivani, Udula Dabare	Comedy	Released on 8 April.
Chutte	Thilak Wehalla	Robin Fernando, Sonia Disa, Jenita Samaraweera, Upali Attanayake, B. S. Perera, Shanthi Lekha, Jagath Rohan, Somy Rathnayake	Action	Released on 29 April.
Karate Joe	Joe Michel	Robin Fernando, Chandi Rasika, Oswald Jayasinghe, Manel Wanaguru, Sathischandra Edirisinghe, Agnes Sirisena, Don Sirisena	Action	Released on 6 May.
Aethin Aethata	Sena Samarasinghe	Rasadari Fonseka, Wimal Kumara de Costa, Karunaratne Hangawatte, Anushka Madiwaka, Senaka Perera, Richard Weerakody, Chandi Rasika, Ronnie Leitch	Drama	Released on 6 May.
Thuththiri Mal	Pathiraja L. S. Dayananda	Oswald Jayasinghe, Malini Fonseka, Suvineetha Weerasinghe, Somy Rathnayake, Shanthi Lekha, Rathnawali Kekunawela, Asoka Hewawitharana	Drama	Released on 14 May.
Dadayama	Vasantha Obeysekera	Swarna Mallawarachchi, Ravindra Randeniya, Somy Rathnayake, Iranganie Serasinghe, Rathnawali Kekunawela, Shirani Kaushalya	Thriller	Released on 20 May.
Suboda	Siri Kularathne	Joe Abeywickrama, Sriyani Amarasena, Wimal Kumara de Costa, Ananda Wickramage, Seetha Kumari, Jayasekara Aponsu, Vincent Vaas	Drama	Released on 27 May.
Hasthi Viyaruwa	H. D. Premaratne	Robin Fernando, Sabeetha Perera, Wimal Kumara de Costa, Mervyn Jayathunga, Somy Rathnayake, Wilson Karu, Freddie Silva	Action	Released on 17 June.
Senehasaka Kandulu	Hemasiri Sellapperuma	Tissa Wijesurendra, Sonia Disa, Somy Rathnayake, Mervyn Jayathunga, Wijeratne Warakagoda, Mahesh Jayasinghe	Drama	Released on 17 June.
Pasa Mithuro	Ananda Hewage	Anoja Weerasinghe. Alexander Fernando, Mervyn Jayathunga, Vijaya Kumaratunga, Shanthi Lekha, Mahesh Jayasinghe	Thriller	Released on 22 June.
Loku Thaththa	K.D. Dayananda	Robin Fernando, Upali Attanayake, Malini Fonseka, Sonia Disa, Lionel Deraniyagala, Don Sirisena, B. S. Perera, Freddie Silva	Action	Released on 25 June.
Loku Thaththa	K. D. Dayananda	Upali Attanayake, Robin Fernando, Malini Fonseka, Sonia Disa, Lionel Deraniyagala, Don Sirisena, B. S. Perera	Drama	Released on 25 June.
Manik Maliga	Gamini Hewawitharana	Upali Attanayake, Sriyani Amarasena, Mervyn Jayathunga, Freddie Silva, Kanthi Lanka, Lilian Edirisinghe, Wilson Karu, Alexander Fernando	Drama	Released on 25 June.
Mal Madhu	Shirley P. Wijeratne	Ravindra Randeniya, Sonia Disa, B. S. Perera, Theresa Weerasinghe, Mahesha Jyamanna	Romance	Released on 15 July.
Sister Mary	M. Arukgoda	Sanath Gunathilake, Sonia Disa, Sriyani Amarasena, Rex Kodippili, Somy Rathnayake, Vijaya Nandasiri, Mark Samaranayake	Drama	Released on 22 July.
Samanala Sihina	Premaweera Gunasekara	Vijaya Kumaranatunga, Swarna Mallawarachchi, Malini Fonseka, Tony Ranasinghe, Amarasiri Kalansuriya, Nadeeka Gunasekara, Leena de Silva	Drama	Released on 16 September.
Chandi Patavu	Pathiraja L. S. Dayananda	Siraj Mahendra Wijeratne, Tharanga Sammani Costa, Champa Jagath Perera, Kalum Vishvajith, Quintus Weerakoon, Hyacinth Wijeratne, Ranjith Suranga	Action	Released on 30 September.
Muwan Palassa 3	M. Arukgoda	Ravindra Randeniya, Malini Fonseka, Joe Abeywickrama, Hugo Fernando, Freddie Silva, Rathnawali Kekunawela, Gemunu Wijesuriya	Drama Action	Released on 4 October.
Thunveni Yamaya	Dharmasiri Bandaranayake	Wasantha Kotuwella, Indira Abeysena, Winston Serasinghe, Iranganie Serasinghe, Ranga Bandaranayake, Shane Ebert, Granville Rodrigo	Drama	Released on 28 October.
Monara Thenna 2	M. Aruggoda	Joe Abeywickrama, Ravindra Randeniya, Sabeetha Perera, Anoja Weerasinghe, Somy Rathnayake, Sonia Disa, J. H. Jayawardena	Thriller	Released on 4 November.
Rathu Makara	Thilak Wehalla	Robin Fernando, Farina Lai, Jeevan Kumaratunga, Mervyn Jayathunga, Somy Rathnayake, Don Sirisena, B. S. Perera	Action	Released on 25 November.
Hithath Hodai Wedath Hodai	J. Rasaratnam	Ravindra Randeniya, Geetha Kumarasinghe, Rukmani Devi, Farina Lai, Freddie Silva, Rex Kodippili, B. S. Perera	Comedy Drama	Released on 2 December.
Muhudu Lihini	Sunil Ariyaratne	Joe Abeywickrama, Ravindra Randeniya, Swarna Mallawarachchi, Anoja Weerasinghe, Robin Fernando, Somalatha Subasinghe	Drama	Released on 19 December.
Bonikka	Louie Vanderstraeten	Tissa Wijesurendra, Mervyn Jayathunga, Geetha Kumarasinghe, Somasiri Dehipitiya, Robin Fernando, Rita Ratnayake, H. R. Jothipala	Adult Drama	Released on 23 December.

== 1984 ==
Title	Director	Cast	Genre	Notes
1984
Shirani	M. H. Gafoor	Joe Abeywickrama, Sanath Gunathilake, Veena Jayakody, Boniface Fernando, Wimal Kumara de Costa, Jenita Samaraweera	Drama	Released on 6 January.
Welle Thanu Maaliga	Shirely P. Wijerathne	Vijaya Kumaratunga, Malini Fonseka, Amarasiri Kalansuriya, Bandu Samarasinghe, Wimal Kumara de Costa, Vincent Vaas	Romance	Released on 27 January.
Maala Giravi	Thilak Wehalla	Jagath Rohan, Farina Lai, Mervyn Jayathunga, Sanath Gunathilake, Jenita Samaraweera, Cletus Mendis, Don Sirisena	Drama	Released on 3 February.
Kiri Kawadi	Somapala Lanerolle	Lucien Bulathsinhala, Samanthi Lanerolle, B. S. Perera, Wilson Karu, Seetha Kumari, Rinsley Weeraratne	Drama	Released on 10 February.
Aadara Geethaya	Amaranath Jayathilake	Douglas Ranasinghe, Sabeetha Perera, Joe Dambulagala, Girley Gunawardana, Seetha Kumari, Chandi Rasika	Romance	Released on 24 February.
Deveni Gamana	H. D. Premaratne	Sabeetha Perera, Sanath Gunathilake, Ravindra Randeniya, Nilanthi Wijesinghe, Iranganie Serasinghe, Denawaka Hamine	Drama	Released on 2 March.
Parasathuro	S.A. Premarathne	Upali Attanayake, Somalatha Subasinghe, Cyril Wickramage, Tissa Abeysekara, Mervyn Jayathunga, Lionel Fernando, David Dharmakeerthi	Historical	Released on 23 March.
Nivan Dakna Jathi Dakva	Somaweera Bopitiya	Douglas Ranasinghe, Shirani Nugera, Mervyn Jayathunga, Somasiri Dehipitiya, Rathnawali Kekunawela, Anoja Weerasinghe	Romance	Released on 6 April.
Thaththai Puthai	M. Arukgoda	Joe Abeywickrama, Sanath Gunathilake, Anoja Weerasinghe, Rex Kodippili, Sonia Disa, Freddie Silva	Comedy Drama	Released on 12 April.
Kekille Rajjuruwo	Tissa Nagodavithana	Anthony C. Perera, Freddie Silva, B. S. Perera, Don Sirisena, Piyadasa Wijekoon, Vasanthi Chathurani	Comedy	Released on 14 April.
Madduma Bandara	Joe Michael	Oswald Jayasinghe, Rathmalie Gunasekera, Don Sirisena, Shirani Nugera, Joe Michael, Robin Fernando, Sathischandra Edirisinghe	Historical	Released on 27 April.
Hitha Honda Kollek	Roy de Silva	Jeevan Kumaratunga, Menik Kurukulasuriya, Sumana Amarasinghe, Mervyn Jayathunga, Somy Rathnayake, Bandu Samarasinghe	Action Comedy	Released on 4 May.
Binari Saha Sudubanda	Kingsley Dissanayake	Vijaya Kumaratunga, Sriyani Amarasena, Somy Rathnayake, Dharshana Panangala, D. R. Nanayakkara, Thalatha Gunasekara	Thriller	Released on 4 May.
Bambara Petikki	Somapala Leelananda	Malini Fonseka, Ravindra Randeniya, Mervyn Jayathunga, Bandu Samarasinghe, B. S. Perera, Eddie Junior	Drama	Released on 1 June.
Kokilaa	William Ohlums	Malini Fonseka, Vijaya Kumaratunga, Eddie Junior, Tony Ranasinghe, Shanthi Lekha, Asoka Ponnamperuma	Romance	Released on 8 June.
Hithawathiya	Camillus Perera; Anton Gregory	Ravindra Randeniya, Malini Fonseka, Anoja Weerasinghe, Mervyn Jayathunga, Shanthi Lekha, Eddie Junior	Drama	Released on 8 June.
Podi Ralahami	Siri Kularatne	Joe Abeywickrama, Sabeetha Perera, Sanath Gunathilake, Ruby de Mel, Somy Rathnayake, Daya Wayaman, Vincent Vaas	Drama	Released on 22 June.
Sasara Chethana	Malini Fonseka	Malini Fonseka, Sanath Gunathilake, Joe Abeywickrama, Rex Kodippili, Shanthi Lekha, Vishaka Siriwardana, Cletus Mendis	Drama	Released on 30 June.
Wadula	Sathischandra Edirisinghe	Malini Fonseka, Joe Abeywickrama, Daya Thennakoon, Dharmadasa Kuruppu, Dharmaransi Amarasinghe, Francis Wanniarachchi	Thriller	Released on 20 July.
Rana Derana	Dilman Jayarathne; Lawrence Cooray	Vijaya Kumaratunga, Sriyani Amarasena, Robin Fernando, Shanthi Lekha, Somy Rathnayake, Sampath Sri Nandalochana, Rex Kodippili	Historical	Released on 21 July.
Namal Renu	E. Rathnam	Baptist Fernando, Jenita Samaraweera, Rita Ratnayake, Piyadasa Wijekoon, B. S. Perera, Vincent Vaas, Manel Wanaguru	Drama	Released on 227 July.
Hima Kathara	Dharmasiri Wickramarathne	Ravindra Randeniya, Geetha Kumarasinghe, Iranganie Serasinghe, Sathischandra Edirisinghe, Joe Abeywickrama, Vincent Vaas	Drama	Released on 3 August.
Hadawathaka Vedana	Joseph Francis Lane	Vijaya Nandasiri, Sumana Amarasinghe, Tissa Wijesurendra, Mervyn Jayathunga, Freddie Silva, Sonia Disa	Drama	Released on 24 August.
Ammai Duwai	M. Arukgoda	Henry Jayasena, Sonia Disa, Sabeetha Perera, Somy Rathnayake, Dharma Sri Munasinghe, Wijeratne Warakagoda	Drama	Released on 24 August.
Arunata Pera	Amaranath Jayathilake	Wijeratne Warakagoda, Chandi Rasika, Denawaka Hamine, S. A. Jamis, Somalatha Subasinghe, Joe Dambulagala	Drama	Released on 14 September.
Maya	Sumitra Peiris	Dimuthu Kuruppu, Ravindra Randeniya, Swarna Mallawarachchi, Tony Ranasinghe, Asoka Peiris, Geetha Kumarasinghe	Thriller	Released on 28 September.
Batti	Dayananda Jayawardane	Nadeeka Gunasekara, Sanath Gunathilake, Ananda Wickramage, Anoja Weerasinghe, Alexander Fernando, D. R. Nanayakkara	Romance	Released on 28 September.
Sahodariyakage Kathawa	Ashoka Dharmarathne	Joe Abeywickrama, Malini Fonseka, Robin Fernando, Wimal Kumara de Costa, Pearl Vasudevi, B. S. Perera	Drama	Released on 12 October.
Ranmalige Wasanawa	Joe Michael	Vijaya Nandasiri, Shirani Nugera, Chandi Rasika, Denawaka Hamine, B. S. Perera, Tudor Karunathilake, Manel Wanaguru	Thriller	Released on 19 October.
Ara Soyza	Herbert Ranjith Peiris	Freddie Silva, Raju Kumarasinghe, Don Sirisena, Sabeetha Perera, Wimal Kumara de Costa, Rukmani Devi, B. S. Perera	Comedy	Released on 26 October.
Muthu Menike	Dharmasiri Caldera	Neil Alles, Shirani Nugera, Somy Rathnayake, Miyuri Samarasinghe, Chandi Rasika, Roy Jayawardena, Don Sirisena	Drama	Released on 26 October.
Birindha	Dayananda Jayawardane	Vijaya Kumaratunga, Sumana Amarasinghe, Shirani Nugera, Mervyn Jayathunga, Manike Attanayake, B. S. Perera	Drama	Released on 9 November.
Sathi Puja	Wimal Ranjith Fernando	Sanath Gunathilake, Suvineetha Weerasinghe, Chandani Seneviratne, J. H. Jayawardena, Larin Fernando, Aloysias Fernando	Drama	Released on 16 November.
Jaya Sikurui	Yasapalitha Nanayakkara	Vijaya Kumaratunga, Geetha Kumarasinghe, Ajith Jinadasa, Shirani Nugera, Jeevan Kumaratunga, Freddie Silva	Action	Released on 30 November.

== 1985 ==
Title	Director	Cast	Genre	Notes
1985
Mihidum Salu	Sunil Ariyaratne	Sanath Gunathilake, Anoja Weerasinghe, Sabeetha Perera, Somy Rathnayake, Indrajith Navinna, S. A. Jamis, Daya Alwis	Romance	Released on 25 January.
Aadara Kathawa	Chandran Rutnam	Menik Kurukulasuriya, Tony Ranasinghe, Iranganie Serasinghe, Anura Medagoda, Farina Lai, Leena de Silva, Wilson Gunaratne	Romance	Released on 25 January.
Mawbima Nethnam Maranaya	Louie Vanderstraeten	Robin Fernando, Geetha Kumarasinghe, Mervyn Jayathunga, Anoja Weerasinghe, Piyadasa Gunasekera, Lionel Deraniyagala, Wijeratne Warakagoda	Action	Released on 8 February.
Rejina	Thilak Lakshman Senevirathne	Amarasiri Kalansuriya, Shirani Nugera, Linton Semage, Mervyn Jayathunga, Somy Rathnayake, Manike Attanayake, Rathmalie Gunasekera	Drama	Released on 15 February.
Chalitha Rangali	Merceline S. Perera	Sanath Gunathilake, Geetha Kumarasinghe, Freddie Silva, Ruby de Mel, B. S. Perera, Wijeratne Warakagoda, Rohini Jayakody	Drama	Released on 8 March.
Araliya Mal	M. Aruggoda	Sanath Gunathilake, Anoja Weerasinghe, Sabeetha Perera, Somy Rathnayake, Vincent Vaas, Freddie Silva, Alexander Fernando, Rex Kodippili	Romance	Released on 15 March.
Raththaran Kanda	Victor Senevirathna	Sabeetha Perera, Somy Rathnayake, Sonia Disa, Freddie Silva, Mabel Blythe, Jagath Rohan, Teddy Vidyalankara, Vincent Seneviratne	Drama	Released on 29 March.
Suddilage Kathawa	Dharmasiri Bandaranayake	Swarna Mallawarachchi, Joe Abeywickrama, Cyril Wickramage, Joe Abeywickrama, Salaman Fonseka, Nilanthi Wijesinghe, Ananda Wijesinghe	Thriller	Released on 29 March.
Puthuni Mata Samawanna	Thilak Wehella	Robin Fernando, Farina Lai, Mervyn Jayathunga, Jeevan Kumaratunga, Cletus Mendis, B. S. Perera, Shanthi Lekha, Vishaka Siriwardana	Action	Released on 5 April.
Channai Kello Dennai	M. Aruggoda	Anoja Weerasinghe, Ravindra Randeniya, Sabeetha Perera, Rex Kodippili, Alexander Fernando, Bandu Munasinghe, Freddie Silva	Drama	Released on 26 April.
Aeya Weradida Oba Kiyanna	Wilfred Silva	Sanath Gunathilake, Anoja Weerasinghe, Vijaya Nandasiri, Sonia Disa, Mervyn Jayathunga, Sumana Amarasinghe, Freddie Silva, Don Sirisena	Drama	Released on 17 May.
Wathsala Akka	Sarath Gunarathne	Nadeeka Gunasekara, Tissa Abeysekara, Sriyani Amarasena, Inoka Amarasena, Douglas Ranasinghe, Daya Alwis, Seetha Kumari	Drama	Released on 28 June.
Doringe Sayanaya	Nishantha De Alvis	Ravindra Randeniya, Swarna Mallawarachchi, Amarasiri Kalansuriya, Nadeeka Gunasekara, Jeevan Kumaratunga, Nihal Silva, Simon Navagattegama	Adult	Released on 28 June.
Obata Diura Kiyannam	Sunil Soma Peiris	Shashi Wijendra, Anoja Weerasinghe, Sriyani Amarasena, Roy de Silva, Sonia Disa, Jeevan Kumaratunga, Geraldine Bandaranayake, Freddie Silva	Romance	Released on 5 July.
Aadarayaka Mahima	Gunadasa Kumarasinghe	Wijendra Prasad, Awanthi Aponsu, Neil de Moraes, Anushi Wijegunawardana, Ananda Wickramage, Rathmalie Gunasekera, B. S. Perera	Drama	Released on 12 July.
Rosy	Yasapalitha Nanayakkara	Sabeetha Perera, Ajith Jinadasa, Mark Samaranayake, Clarice de Silva, Rex Kodippili, Freddie Silva, Nihal Silva, Wijeratne Warakagoda	Drama	Released on 26 July.
Sudu Maama	E.M.P. Bandara; M. Admani	Tony Ranasinghe, Sumana Amarasinghe, Wimal Kumara de Costa, Vijaya Nandasiri, Rohini Jayakody, Manel Wanaguru, Saranapala Suriarachchi	Drama	Released on 26 July.
Du Daruwo	Gamini Hewawitharana	Douglas Ranasinghe, Sriyani Amarasena, Vijaya Nandasiri, Jeevan Kumaratunga, Somy Rathnayake, Mervyn Jayathunga, Shirani Nugera	Family	Released on 10 August.
Varsity Kella	Kandapola Kumarathunga	Manohari Wimalatunga, Sanath Gunathilake, Anoja Weerasinghe, Jayasekara Aponsu, Wijeratne Warakagoda, Chandrapala Wijesooriya, Awanthi Aponsu	Drama	Released on 4 October.
Karadiya Walalla	Cyril Wickramage	Ravindra Randeniya, Swarna Mallawarachchi, Wimal Kumara de Costa, Somasiri Dehipitiya, D. R. Nanayakkara, Neil Alles, Maureen Charuni	Thriller	Released on 11 October.
Sura Duthiyo	Robin Fernando	Rosy Senanayake, Robin Fernando, Jeevan Kumaratunga, Cletus Mendis, Vishaka Siriwardana, Rex Kodippili, Cletus Mendis, Wilson Karu	Action	Released on 22 November.
Yuganthaya	Lester James Peiris	Gamini Fonseka, Richard de Zoysa, Suvineetha Weerasinghe, Ramani Bartholomeusz, Mahal Wijewardena, Punya Heendeniya, Douglas Ranasinghe	Drama	Released on 27 December. Entered into the 14th Moscow International Film Festival.
Kiri Madu Wel	Ariyadasa Withanage; Saman Weeraman	Sanath Gunathilake, Sabeetha Perera, Leena de Silva, Nadeeka Gunasekara, Thalatha Gunasekara, Wijeratne Warakagoda, Rex Kodippili	Drama	Released on 29 December.

== 1986 ==
Title	Director	Cast	Genre	Notes
1986
Yali Hamuwennai	Sena Samarasinghe	Gamini Fonseka, Sriyani Amarasena, Sabeetha Perera, Harish Jayaratne, Hugo Fernando, Richard Weerakody, Shirani Nugera	Romance	Released on 7 February.
Mal Warusa	K. D. Dayananda	Malini Fonseka, Sanath Gunathilake, Robin Fernando, Amarasiri Kalansuriya, Anoja Weerasinghe, Sureni Senarath	Drama	Released on 21 February.
Prarthana	Priyantha Rathnayake	Sanath Gunathilake, Menik Kurukulasuriya, Rosy Senanayake, Somy Rathnayake, Sriyani Amarasena, Freddie Silva	Drama	Released on 7 March.
Asipatha Mamai	Gerard Fernando	Jeevan Kumaratunga, Somy Rathnayake, Vishaka Siriwardana, Jayasekara Aponsu, Maureen Charuni, Menik Kurukulasuriya	Action	Released on 14 March.
Athuru Mithuru	Ariyarathne Withanage	Somy Rathnayake, Chandra Kaluarachchi, Amarasiri Kalansuriya, Wimal Halangoda, Jayalath Manoratne, Mervyn Jayathunga	Action	Released on 4 April.
Peralikarayo	Dinesh Priyasad	Vijaya Kumaranatunga, Tanuja, Anoja Weerasinghe, Jeevan Kumaratunga, Menik Kurukulasuriya, Sumana Gomez, Bandu Samarasinghe, Tennyson Cooray	Action comedy	Released on 25 April.
Dushyanthi	S. Thevendra	Nihal Gamage, Sabeetha Perera, Sonia Disa, Ajith Jinadasa, Ronnie Leitch, Leena de Silva, Wijeratne Warakagoda, Mervyn Jayathunga	Drama	Released on 16 May.
Gimhane Gee Naade	Dharmasiri Caldera	Vijaya Kumaratunga, Shirani Nugera, Somy Rathnayake, Nihal Silva, Nihal Jayawardena, Deshian Amarasinghe, Miyuri Samarasinghe	Drama	Released on 16 May.
Maldeniye Simiyon	D.B. Nihalsinghe	Ravindra Randeniya, Anoja Weerasinghe, Joe Abeywickrama, Ravindra Randeniya, Vincent Vaas, Daya Alwis	Drama	Released on 22 May.
Dev Duwa	Daya Wimalaweera	Vijaya Kumaratunga, Malini Fonseka, Joe Abeywickrama, Sonia Disa, Anoja Weerasinghe, Shirani Nugera	Romance	Released on 11 July.
Jaya Apatai	Sunil Soma Peiris	Vijaya Kumaratunga, Jeevan Kumaratunga, Ravindra Randeniya, Cletus Mendis, Sonia Disa, Mervyn Jayathunga	Action	Released on 25 July.
Koti Waligaya	Gamini Fonseka	Gamini Fonseka, Geetha Kumarasinghe, Tony Ranasinghe, Rex Kodippili, Ravindra Randeniya, Leena de Silva, Sanath Gunathilake	Action	Released on 1 August.
Pooja	Dharmasiri Gamage	Joe Abeywickrama, Amarasiri Kalansooriya, Geetha Kanthi Jayakody, Kamal Addaraarachchi, Ravindra Randeniya	Romance	Released on 6 September.
Soora Saradiyel	Anton Gregory	Ravindra Randeniya, Geetha Kumarasinghe, Mervyn Jayathunga, Cletus Mendis, Wijeratne Warakagoda, Denawaka Hamine	Epic Historical	Released on 24 October.
Dinuma	Ananda Wickramasinghe; Sunil Soma Peiris	Sanath Gunathilake, Vasanthi Chathurani, Freddie Silva, Tony Ranasinghe, Wilson Karu, Leena de Silva	Drama	Released on 7 November.
Avurududa	Nimal Thennakoon; Wimal Saman Jayaweera	Malani Fonseka, Henry Jayasena, Iranganie Serasinghe, Somy Rathnayake, Sanath Gunathilake, Miyuri Samarasinghe	Drama	Released on 5 December.
Aadara Hasuna	H. D. Premaratne	Ravindra Randeniya, Vasanthi Chathurani, Joe Abeywickrama, Nawanandana Wijesinghe, Ruby de Mel, Vincent Vaas	Romance	Released on 13 December.

== 1987 ==
Title	Director	Cast	Genre	Notes
1987
Yugayen Yugayata	Lenin Moraes	Vijaya Kumaratunga, Nadeeka Gunasekara, Freddie Silva, Mervyn Jayathunga, Shanthi Lekha, Somy Rathnayake	Drama	Released on 23 January.
Hitha Honda Chandiya	Ranjith Siriwardane	Jeevan Kumaratunga, Sabeetha Perera, Anoja Weerasinghe, Mervyn Jayathunga, Rex Kodippili, Neil Alles, Freddie Silva	Action	Released on 30 January.
Janelaya	Chandran Rutnam	Ravindra Randeniya, Razi Anwar, Anoja Weerasinghe, Suvineetha Weerasinghe, Tony Ranasinghe, Asoka Perera, Jayantha Jayatilaka	Mystery	Released on 27 February.
Sathya Grahanaya	D. B. Warnasiri	Gamini Fonseka, Richard de Zoysa, J. H. Jayawardena, Tony Ranasinghe, U. Ariyawimal, Veena Jayakody, Somy Rathnayake	Political	Released on 13 March.
Thaththi Mang Adarei	Roy de Silva	Ravindra Randeniya, Rosy Senanayake, Sanath Gunathilake, Roy de Silva, Sumana Amarasinghe, Freddie Silva, Ruby de Mel	Drama	Released on 27 March.
Podi Vijay	Nishantha De Alwis	Amarasiri Kalansuriya, Sabeetha Perera, Cyril Wickramage, Bandu Munasinghe, Vincent Vaas, Miyuri Samarasinghe	Action	Released on 18 April.
Mangala Thagga	H. D. Premaratne	Ravindra Randeniya, Sanath Gunathilake, Sriyantha Mendis, Vasanthi Chathurani, Jayalath Manoratne, Sanoja Bibile, Cyril Wickramage	Drama	Released on 5 May.
Kiulegedara Mohottala	Pathiraja L. S. Dayananda	Wilson Karu, Pathiraja L. S. Dayananda, Ranjith Suranga, Hyacinth Wijeratne, Somy Rathnayake, Arthur Gunawardena, Saman Bokalawala	Epic Historical	Released on 29 May.
Yukthiyada Shakthiyada	Yasapalitha Nanayakkara	Vijaya Kumaratunga, Ajith Jinadasa, Freddie Silva, Geetha Kumarasinghe, Damayanthi Fonseka, Mervyn Jayathunga, Bandu Samarasinghe	Action	Released on 12 June.
Kele Kella	Bernard Reginald	Malini Fonseka, Ravindra Randeniya, Anoja Weerasinghe, Hugo Fernando, Somy Rathnayake, Shanthi Lekha, Mervyn Jayathunga	Drama	Released on 26 June.
Nombara Ekai	Dinesh Priyasad	Bandu Samarasinghe, Tennyson Cooray, Jayalath Fernando, Pearl Vasudevi, Priyalal Mendis, Mervyn Jayathunga, Manel Wanaguru	Comedy	Released on 11 July.
Kawuluwa	Danny W. Pathirana	Vijaya Kumaratunga, Swarna Mallawarachchi, Sanath Gunathilake, Sabeetha Perera, Rex Kodippili, Ruby de Mel, Nihal Silva	Drama	Released on 24 July.
Raja Weda Karayo	Sunil Soma Peiris	Vijaya Kumaratunga, Ravindra Randeniya, Sanath Gunathilake, Geetha Kumarasinghe, Sriyani Amarasena, Sonia Disa	Action	Released on 11 September.
Ran Damvel	Elaric Lionel Fernando	Sanath Gunathilake, Menik Kurukulasooriya, Vijaya Kumaratunga, Rosy Senanayake, Wilson Karu, Freddie Silva	Drama	Released on 2 October.
Viragaya	Tissa Abeysekara	Sanath Gunathilake, Sabeetha Perera, Sriyani Amarasena, Sunethra Sarachchandra, Daya Alwis, Somalatha Subasinghe	Drama	Released on 2 October.
Obatai Priye Adare	Sunil Soma Peiris	Vijaya Kumaratunga, Sanath Gunathilake, Geetha Kumarasinghe, Mervyn Jayathunga, Ruby de Mel, Chitra Wakishta	Action	Released on 11 December.
Ahinsa	Malini Fonseka	Lucky Dias, Malini Fonseka, Nadeeka Gunasekara, Jeevan Kumaratunga, Wimal Kumara de Costa, Mervyn Jayathunga	Drama	Released on 20 December.

== 1988 ==
Title	Director	Cast	Genre	Notes
1988
Rasa Rahasak	Yasapalitha Nanayakkara	Sanath Gunathilake, Sabeetha Perera, Joe Abeywickrama, Freddie Silva, Sumana Gomes, Jeevan Kumaratunga, Girley Gunawardana, Roy de Silva	Comedy Romance	Released on 6 February.
Chandin Geth Chandiya	Hemasiri Sellapperuma	Sanath Gunathilake, Maureen Charuni, Mervyn Jayathunga, Hugo Fernando, Freddie Silva, Leena de Silva, Manel Chandralatha, Tennyson Cooray	Action	Released on 26 March.
Gedara Budhun Amma	Roy de Silva	Somy Rathnayake, Sumana Amarasinghe, Kamal Addararachchi, Jeevan Kumaratunga, Freddie Silva, Clarice de Silva, Kumudumali de Silva, Roy de Silva	Drama Romance	Released on 15 April.
Sandakada Pahana	Susila Rathna Kumara	Ravindra Randeniya, Malini Fonseka, Vijaya Nandasiri, Henry Jayasena, Mark Samaranayake, D. R. Nanayakkara, Denawaka Hamine	Drama	Released on 6 May.
Amme Oba Nisa	Anton Kingsley	Shashi Wijendra, Geetha Kumarasinghe, Sriyani Amarasena, Buddhi Wickrama, Freddie Silva, Mahesh Jayasinghe, Wilson Karu, Mervyn Jayathunga	Drama	Released on 21 June.
Angulimala	Baptist Fernando	Ravindra Randeniya, Sriyani Amarasena, Malini Fonseka, Joe Abeywickrama, Lucky Dias, Roy de Silva, Mark Samaranayake, Denawaka Hamine	Drama Religious	Released on 3 June.
Nawa Gilunath Ban Chun	Hemasiri Sellapperuma	Lucky Dias, Jeevan Kumaratunga, Malini Fonseka, Freddie Silva, Manel Chandralatha, Anthony C. Perera, Berty Gunathilake, Mahesh Jayasinghe	Drama Comedy	Released on 22 July.
Durga	K.A.W. Perera	Priyankara Perera, Geetha Kumarasinghe, Ranjan Ramanayake, Sunil Hettiarachchi, Mervyn Jayathunga, D.R. Nanayakkara, Freddie Silva	Drama Romance	Released on 19 August.
Satana	Ananda Wickramasinghe	Sanath Gunathilake, Vasanthi Chathurani, Freddie Silva, Tony Ranasinghe, Nihal Silva, Sriyani Amarasena, Dilani Abeywardana	Action	Released on 27 August.
Newatha Api Ekvemu	Milton Jayawardena	Jeevan Kumaratunga, Anoja Weerasinghe, Lal Weerasinghe, Mervyn Jayathunga, Menik Kurukulasuriya, Freddie Silva, Ajith Jinadasa, Wimal Kumara de Costa	Romantic Drama	Released on 23 November.
Ko Hathuro	Sunil T. Fernando	Wilson Karunaratne, Sonia Disa, Cletus Mendis, Shanthi Lekha, Mervyn Jayathunga, Teddy Vidyalankara, Nihal Silva, Samanthi Lanerolle	Action Drama	Released on 9 December.
Sagara Jalaya Madi Haduva Oba Handa	Sumitra Peiris	Swarna Mallawarachchi, Ravindra Randeniya, Susith Chaminda de Silva, Sunethra Sarachchandra, H. A. Perera, Rasika Kumari, Denawaka Hamine, Trilicia Gunawardena	Drama	Released on 30 December.

== 1989 ==
Title	Director	Cast	Genre	Notes
1989
Mamai Raja	Sunil Soma Peiris	Vijaya Kumaratunga, Jeevan Kumaratunga, Sabeetha Perera, Anoja Weerasinghe, Lionel Deraniyagala, Piyadasa Wijekoon, Freddie Silva	Action	Released on 6 January.
Badulu Kochchiya	Kandapola Kumaratunga	Vijaya Kumaratunga, Geetha Kumarasinghe, Robin Fernando, Leena de Silva, Freddie Silva, Vijaya Nandasiri, Lilian Edirisinghe	Drama	Released on 25 February.
Kedapathaka Chaya	Vasantha Obeysekera	Vijaya Kumaratunga, Sanath Gunathilake, Swarna Mallawarachchi, Sunethra Sarachchandra, J. H. Jayawardena, Granville Rodrigo, Srinath Maldeniya	Drama	Released on 24 March.
Okkoma Rajawaru	Thilak Wehalla; V. Siwadasan	Sanath Gunathilake, Jeevan Kumaratunga, Nadeeka Gunasekara, Shashi Wijendra, Wilson Karu, Mark Samson, Roy de Silva	Action	Released on 14 April.
Nommara 17	Hemasiri Sellapperuma	Vijaya Kumaranatunga, Sabeetha Perera, Sanath Gunathilake, Jeevan Kumaratunga, Freddie Silva, Menik Kurukulasooriya	Action comedy	Released on 21 July.
Obata Rahasak Kiyannam	Sunil Soma Peiris	Jeevan Kumaratunga, Anoja Weerasinghe, Menik Kurukulasuriya, Freddie Silva, Cletus Mendis, Mervyn Jayathunga, Somy Rathnayake	Romance	Released on 11 August.
Shakthiya Obai Amme	Ranga Wijendra; Anton Kingsley	Shashi Wijendra, Malini Fonseka, Mervyn Jayathunga, Wilson Karu, Gamini Fonseka, Mark Samson, Lucky Dias	Action	Released on 18 August.
Sinasenna Raththaran	Sunil Soma Peiris	Jeevan Kumaratunga, Ranjan Ramanayake, Anoja Weerasinghe, Cletus Mendis, Mervyn Jayathunga, Somy Rathnayake, Lionel Deraniyagala	Action Drama	Released on 15 September.
Waradata Danduwam	Dinesh Priyasad	Vijaya Kumaratunga, Jeevan Kumaratunga, Malini Fonseka, Somy Rathnayake, Nadeeka Gunasekara, Mervyn Jayathunga, Wilson Karu	Action	Released on 22 December.
Randenigala Sinhaya	Ranjith Siriwardane	Vijaya Kumaratunga, Jeevan Kumaratunga, Anoja Weerasinghe, Lionel Deraniyagala, Cletus Mendis, Maureen Charuni, Freddie Silva	Action	Released on 23 December.
Sirimadura	Parakrama Niriella	Malini Fonseka, Anoja Weerasinghe, Ravindra Randeniya, Lucky Dias, Cyril Wickramage, H. A. Perera, Salaman Fonseka	Thriller	Released on 29 December.

== See also ==
- Cinema of Sri Lanka
- List of Sri Lankan films
