= Somasiri Dehipitiya =

Sri Lankan actor

Somasiri Dehipitiya සෝමසිරි දෙහිපිටිය
- Born: Dehipitiyage Don Somasiri; January 29, 1933; Gampaha, Sri Lanka
- Died: April 27, 1982 (aged 49); Gampaha, Sri Lanka
- Education: Galahitiyawe Central College
- Occupation: Actor
- Years active: 1967–1982
- Spouse: Rupa Ranasinghe
- Children: 2

Dehipitiyage Don Somasiri (January 29, 1933 – April 27, 1982), popularly known as Somasiri Dehipitiya, was a popular Sri Lankan character actor. He is best known for performances in Dharmasena Pathiraja and Vasantha Obeysekera films.

== Personal life ==
Dehipitiya was born on January 29, 1933, in Gampaha, Sri Lanka. His father, Wilson Dehipitiya worked in the Railway Department. His mother Catherine Wingasinghe was a housewife. He completed education from Gampaha Primary School and later at Galahitiyawa Central College. After completing his primary education, he began work as a civil servant eventually reaching a position at the Vehicles Department - Colombo in the engineer division. While appearing in cinema and theatre, he professionally worked as a store keeper in the Irrigation Department.

His younger brother, Chandrasiri Dehipitiya was also a renowned actor, art director and sculptor. Chandrasiri was the artistic director of the film 'Ves Gatto'. He was also a member of the choir in the play 'Maname'. Chandrasiri died on 9 December 2020. Dehipitiya was married to his longtime partner Rupa Ranasinghe who worked as a dance teacher in government schools and also acted as a dancer in about four films including Laa Dalu and Akkara Paha. He was a father of one son: Damith Sirilal, and one daughter: Nayananjali, who specializes in advertising as well as film costume design. Damith is a Regional Manager at a private bank who is three years older than Nayananjali.

In 1981, he suffered from jaundice. He died of alcoholism in 1982.

== Career ==
He displayed his artistic talents since the age of ten, where in 1951 he greeted the then Prime Minister DS Senanayake with a warm welcome who came to his college. He later moved to drama and later won the Best Actor award for his role in Manamula at the 1954 School Drama Competition. Somasiri then entered radio at a young age with many talents. He once played the flute and at one time exhibited his talents as a radio dramatist. Meanwhile, veteran radio artist Gemunu Wijesuriya saw his talent and took steps to introduce Somasiri to the public stage.

He started to act in stage plays such as Mati Karaththaya, Rathnawali produced by P. Welikala as well as Mahagamasekera's Kundalakeshi, Swarnahansi. Then he joined Ediriweera Sarachchandra for his numerous stage plays such as Pabawathi, Raththaran, Elowa Gihin Melowa Awa and Kundala Keshi. Then he acted in Dayananda Gunawardena's Ibi Katta, Amathi Pattama, and Neil Wijesinghe's Ane Massine.

Dehipitiya made his acting debut in Siri Gunasinghe's landmark Sath Samudura in 1967. Throughout the 1970s and early-1980s, he was a mainstay in alternative cinema with roles in such critically acclaimed works as Thun Man Handiya (1970), Ves Gatho (1970), Hara Lakshaya (1971), Ahas Gauwa (1974), Sihasuna (1974), Walmath Wuvo (1977), Deviyani Oba Koheda (1977), Eya Dan Loku Lamayek (1977), Bambaru Awith (1978), Anupama (1978), Sarungale (1979), Podi Malli (1979), Siribo Aiyya (1980), Para Dige (1980), Karumakarayo (1980), Soldadu Unnahe (1981), Sagarayak Meda (1981) and Ridi Nimnaya (1982).

Dehipitiya also dabbled as an assistant director with Ves Gatho in 1970 and as a playback singer in Walmath Wuvo with Cyril Wickramage. In 1980, Dehipitiya won the award for the Best Supporting Actor for his role in Siribo Ayya in Presidential Award Ceremony.

== Legacy ==
The 40th Commemoration Ceremony was held on Saturday 23rd at 3.00 pm at the Tharangani Hall of the National Film Corporation. After that, the film Diyamanthi was screened.

== Filmography ==
Year	Film	Role	Ref.
1967	Sath Samudura	Peter	
1970	Thun Man Handiya	Jamis	
1970	Wes Gaththo	Somey	
1971	Haara Lakshaya	Seney's brother-in-law	
1973	Hathdinnath Tharu	Pearli's father	
1973	Dahakin Ekek	Consoling Villager	
1973	Sadahatama Oba Mage		
1974	Ahas Gauwa	Somey	
1974	Sihasuna	Kirigora	
1974	Kasthuri Suwanda	Danapala 'Dannaya'	
1974	Dinum Kanuwa		
1974	Kalyani Ganga	Fisherman	
1974	Sagarika		
1975	Aese Idiripita		
1975	Lassana Dawasak	Somey	
1976	Pradeepe Ma Wewa		
1976	Saradielge Putha	Mudalithuma 'Mudaliyar'	
1976	Mangala		
1976	Nilla Soya		
1976	Walmath Wuwo	Somadasa	
1976	Diyamanthi	Kushan Gunawardena 'Kojath Gune'	
1977	Deviyani Oba Kohida	Jamis	
1977	Pembara Madhu		
1977	Eya Dan Loku Lamayek	Bootlegger	
1977	Chandi Putha	Cyril	
1977	Maruwa Samaga Wase	Piyadasa 'Mudalali'	
1978	Asha Dasin		
1978	Selinage Walawwa	Simon 'Aiyya'	
1978	Veera Puran Appu	Puran Appu's brother	
1978	Bambaru Avith	Anton's friend	
1978	Kumara Kumariyo	William	
1978	Anupama	Mudalali	
1979	Sarungale	Mr. Jayasekara	
1979	Visihathara Peya	Jothindra	
1980	Jodu Walalu		
1980	Kanchana		
1980	Siribo Ayya	Bandulahamy	
1980	Parithyagaya	Jayathilaka's uncle	
1980	Para dige		
1980	Karumakkarayo	Weladum Mahathaya	
1981	Valampuri		
1981	Soldadu Unnehe		
1981	Vajira	Vajira's father	
1981	Sagarayak Meda	Jailed abortion doctor	
1981	Sathara Diganthaya		
1981	Samawenna	Peter	
1982	Re Manamali	Manori's father	
1982	Sakvithi Suwaya	Mr. Gunawardena 'Gune'	
1982	Ridee Nimnaya		
1982	Yahalu Yeheli	Kalu Diyonis	
1983	Sandamali	Appuhamy	
1983	Sumithuro	Suranga's father	
1983	Niliyakata Pem Kalemi	Brucle 'Mudalali'	
1983	Bonikka	Duncan Wickremasinghe	
1984	Niwan Dakna Jathi Dakwa		
1984	Batti		
1985	Karadiya Walalla		
