= Angulimala (disambiguation) =

Aṅgulimāla is an important early figure in Buddhism.

Angulimala or Angulimaal may also refer to:

- Angulimaal (film), a 1960 Indian drama film
- Angulimala (1988 film), a Sri Lankan film
- Angulimala (2003 film), a Thai drama film
- Angulimala (2013 film), an Indian Kannada drama film

== See also ==
- Aṅgulimālīya Sūtra, a part of the Mahāyāna Buddhist Tathāgatagarbha discourses
