= Diya Yata Gindara =

Diya Yata Gindara දිය යට ගින්දර
- Directed by: Udayakantha Warnasuriya
- Written by: Udayakantha Warnasuriya
- Produced by: Cinema Entertainment
- Starring: Tony Ranasinghe; Sanath Gunathilake; Amarasiri Kalansuriya
- Cinematography: K.D Dayananda
- Edited by: Stanley de Alwis
- Music by: Sangeeth Wickramasinghe
- Production company: Dil Process Lab
- Distributed by: CEL Theaters
- Release date: 4 March 2004
- Running time: 104 minutes
- Country: Sri Lanka
- Language: Sinhala

Diya Yata Gindara (Fire within Water) (Sinhala: දිය යට ගින්දර) is a 2004 Sri Lankan Sinhala drama film directed by Udayakantha Warnasuriya and produced by Cinema Entertainment private limited. It stars Achala Alles and Sanath Gunathilake in lead roles along with Amarasiri Kalansuriya and Tony Ranasinghe. Music composed by Sangeeth Wickramasinghe. It is the 1027th Sri Lankan film in the Sinhala cinema.

During the shooting of the film, a Skoda car in running condition valued over Rs. 100,000 was set aflame. Shooting was completed within two months in and around Colombo city, Piliyandala, Kirindiwela and Nuwara Eliya. The film marks the return of actor Amarasiri Kalansuriya to the silver screen after seventeen years.

== Cast ==
- Sanath Gunathilake as Sampath Harischandra
- Achala Alles as Madara Harischandra
- Amarasiri Kalansuriya as Jayakody
- Srimal Wedisinghe as Inspector Jayasumana Bandara
- Jeevan Handunnetti as Rohana
- Buddhika Rambukwella as Grecian
- Srinath Maddumage as Herath
- Janesh Silva as Nizam
- Tyrone Michael as Detective
- Tony Ranasinghe as Police Chief
- Nirosha Herath as Madara's sister
- Seetha Kumari as Sampath's mother
- Gunawardena Hettiarachchi as Burned Car Inspector
- Ariyasena Gamage as Burned car discoverer
- D.B. Gangodathenna as Communication store owner
