= Menik Kurukulasuriya =

Sri Lankan actress

Menik Kurukulasuriya මැණික් කුරුකුලසුරිය
- Born: Hyacinth Menik Kanthi Kurukulasuriya; 22 October 1957 (age 68); Colombo, Sri Lanka
- Education: Good Shepherd Convent, Panadura; All Saints Balika, Borella; St. Paul’s Girls School, Milagiriya
- Occupation: Film Actress.
- Years active: 1973-present
- Relatives: Jeevarani Kurukulasuriya (sister); Shirani Kurukulasuriya (sister); Janaki Kurukulasuriya (sister)

Hyacinth Menik Kanthi Kurukulasuriya (born 22 October 1957), popularly known as Menik Kurukulasuriya, is an actress in Sri Lankan cinema.

== Personal life ==
She was born as the youngest of the family. Her father was Kurukulasuriyage Venus Anthony Fernando. Kurukualsuriya studied at Good Shepherd Convent, Panadura, All Saints Balika Borella and St. Paul’s Girls School, Milagiriya.

She has three elder sisters - Jeevarani, Shirani and Janaki, all are actresses. She also has one brother, Vivek, who currently lives in Australia. Shirani got the opportunity to act with Jeevarani in the film Ranmuthu Duwa. Janaki got the opportunity to play with sister in the film Sasaraka Hati.

Jeevarani is married to Lanka Wijeratne, who is a doctor. They married in 1968. They moved to Australia after spending five years of marriage in Sri Lanka. The couple has three daughters - Sajeewani, Senani and Lankangani. Elder daughter, Sanjeewani is a nutritionist and a first-class singer. Younger daughters are doctors. Lankangani is married to entrepreneur Nalaka Edirisinghe. Nalaka is the son of media personality Soma Edirisinghe. Senani is also a singer and released her first solo track in 2016.

== Career ==
At first she never intended to become an actress like her elder sisters. Nonetheless Menik followed in their path after being elected Goya Beauty Queen in 1971.

Kurukuasuriya made her debut in Dharmasena Pathiraja's 1973 film Ahas Gauwa playing Amarasiri Kalansuriya's sister.

== Filmography ==
=== Film ===
Year	Film	Role	Ref.
1963	Deepashika	Child	
1974	Ahas Gauwa	Vijay's sister	
1974	Senakeliya		
1975	The God King	Somitra	
1980	Sevaneli Aeda Minissu		
1981	Bamba Ketu Hati	Menaka	
1981	Vajira	Kamani	
1982	Thani Tharuwa	Sumudu	
1982	Biththi Hathara	Chandani	
1982	Thana Giravi	Padme	
1982	Sakvithi Suwaya	Menik	
1982	Paramitha		
1984	Hitha Honda Kollek		
1985	Adara Kathawa	Kanthi	
1986	Prarthana		
1986	Asipatha Mamai	Nora	
1986	Peralikarayo	Menik	
1987	Raja Wadakarayo	Asha	
1987	Ahinsa	Party guest	
1987	Ran Dam Wal		
1988	Newatha Api Hamuwemu	Natalia	
1989	Obata Rahasak Kiyannam		
1989	Nommara 17	Devi	
1990	Pem Rajadahana		
1990	Christhu Charithaya	Mary Magdalene	
1990	Wana Bambara		
1992	Oba Mata Wishwasai	Yasodhara	
1993	Till Death Do Us Part		
1993	Sergeant Nallathambi	Dancer	
1994	Landuni Oba Devaganaki	Lucky's sister	
1994	Nohadan Kumariyo		
1995	Deviyani Sathya Surakinna	Suresh's crush	
1995	Vijaya Geetha	Geetha Jayawickrama 'Kusuma'	
1995	Inspector Geetha	Janu	
1995	Vijay Saha Ajay	Shiromi	
1996	Obatai Me Aradhana		
2002	Seethala Gini Kandu	Sirimalee	
2014	Samige Kathawa		
