= Hima Tharaka =

- Directed by: Rodney Vidanapathirana
- Written by: Marlon Widanapathirana
- Produced by: RW Productions
- Starring: Jagath Chamila; Nadee Chandrasekara; Amarasiri Kalansuriya
- Cinematography: Kithsiri Hewage; Ranga Kariyawasam
- Edited by: Gayan Sampath; Mahendra Senarathna
- Music by: Nimal Gunasekara; Manoj Pieris
- Distributed by: Chithra cinema
- Release date: 20 June 2017
- Country: Sri Lanka
- Language: Sinhala

Hima Tharaka (Sinhala: හිම තාරකා, lit. 'Snowy Stars') is a 2017 Sri Lankan Sinhala drama film directed by Rodney Vidanapathirana and produced by Kanthi Alahakone for RW Productions. It stars Jagath Chamila and Nadee Chandrasekara in lead roles along with Amarasiri Kalansuriya and Maureen Charuni. The film was shot around the city Moronthuduwa, Bandaragama. It is the 1280th Sri Lankan film in the Sinhala cinema.

In July 2020, the film was re-screened in Ananda film theater, Gampola.

== Cast ==
- Jagath Chamila
- Nadee Chandrasekara
- Amarasiri Kalansuriya
- Wimal Alahakoon
- Maureen Charuni
- Wasanthi Gunarathna
- Miyuri Samarasinghe
- Manel Wanaguru

== Song ==
No.	Title	Singer(s)	Length
1.	"Seethale Walakule"	Gihan Godakanda, Jayani Wellarachchi
