= Julietge Bhumikawa =

Julietge Bhumikawa ජුලියට්ගේ භූමිකාව
- Directed by: Jackson Anthony
- Written by: Jackson Anthony
- Produced by: Gamini Nanayakkara; Anoja Weerasinghe
- Starring: Anoja Weerasinghe; Kamal Addararachchi; Vasanthi Chathurani
- Cinematography: Andrew Jayamanne
- Edited by: Stanley de Alwis
- Music by: Premasiri Khemadasa
- Release date: 31 July 1998
- Country: Sri Lanka
- Language: Sinhala

Julietge Bhumikawa (Illusions of Juliet) (Sinhala: ජුලියට්ගේ භූමිකාව) is a 1998 Sri Lankan Sinhala drama thriller film directed by Jackson Anthony as his maiden directorial venture and co-produced by Gamini Nanayakkara and Anoja Weerasinghe. It stars Anoja Weerasinghe in lead role along with Kamal Addararachchi, Vasanthi Chathurani and Mahendra Perera. Music composed by Premasiri Khemadasa. It is the 902nd Sri Lankan film in the Sinhala cinema.

== Awards ==
- Sarasaviya Critic Awards 1996 - Most Promising Director (Jackson Anthony)

== Cast ==
- Anoja Weerasinghe as Anjali 'Anju' Senanayake
- Kamal Addararachchi as Devinda Dassanayake
- Vasanthi Chathurani as Saroja
- Mahendra Perera as Supun
- Daya Alwis as Lawrence
- Chandani Seneviratne as Psychologist
- Sriyantha Mendis as Theater director
- Kusum Renu as 'Putha' patient
- Chitra Wakishta as Gossiping dubber
- Sujani Menaka as Saroja's servant
- Kumara Thirimadura as Stage onlooker
- Sunil Soma Peiris as Somasekera
- Dilki Weerasinghe as Stage dancer
- Thamara Dilrukshi as Saroja's Nangi
- Shashi Wijendra as Somasekera's friend
- Rathnawali Kekunawela as Gossiping dubber
- Senaka Wijesinghe as Film assistant
- Sujatha Paramanathan as Mother
- Mali Jayaweerage as Head Nurse
- Sanet Dikkumbura as Asylum patient
- Jayalath Fernando as Asylum patient
- Winnie Wettasinghe as Asylum patient
- Upatissa Balasuriya as Assistant director
- Arun Dias Bandaranayake as Award presenter
- Premilla Kuruppu as Asylum patient
