= Christhu Charithaya =

Christhu Charithaya ක්‍රිස්තු චරිතය
- Directed by: Sunil Ariyaratne
- Written by: Sunil Ariyaratne
- Produced by: Alerik Lionel Fernando
- Starring: Vijaya Kumaratunga; Menik Kurukulasuriya; Neil Alles; Nathali Anne Greet
- Cinematography: Donald Karunarathna
- Edited by: Sextus Aponso
- Music by: Premasiri Khemadasa
- Release date: 9 October 1990
- Running time: 138 minutes
- Country: Sri Lanka
- Language: Sinhala

Christhu Charithaya (Sinhala: ක්‍රිස්තු චරිතය) is a 1990 Sri Lankan Sinhala biographical film directed by Sunil Ariyaratne and produced by Alerik Lionel Fernando. It stars Vijaya Kumaratunga as Jesus along with ensemble cast of popular film artists. Music composed by Premasiri Khemadasa. It is the 712th Sri Lankan film in the Sinhala cinema.

The film is based on the life of Jesus Christ until crucifixion. It was the first Sinhala film based on Christianity and directed by a Buddhist.

== Production ==
The script of the film was written by Sunil Ariyaratne in 1980 under the guidance of film producer Alerik Lionel Fernando. They both agreed to choose Vijaya Kumaratunga as the lead role. The film shooting was started in 1981 under several controversies. However, after in July 1982, the Sri Lanka Catholic Council appointed an Advisory Committee consisting of four priests. The Sinhalese section of the Catholic doctrine of the Chilaw Padaviya has sent a memorandum to the President and requested that the work of the Christian character be stopped immediately. Finally, on March 23, 1983, the cabinet bans the producing of the film. In the meantime, after the film began, threatening letters were ordered to stop the film. The principal character, Vijaya Kumaratunga, who was suspected of being a Naxalite, had been remanded by the then government, his image was shown on television and the publicity of his voice and name on the radio had been banned.

Post production of the film was started in mid-1982 at Hendala Vijaya Studios. The screenplay of the film was first released as a Sirisumana Godage publication. It was re-released with 22 color photographs.

== Cast ==
- Vijaya Kumaratunga as Jesus Christ
- Stefan Abeyesinhe as Baby Jesus
- Menik Kurukulasuriya as Mary Magdalene
- Rex Kodippili as Pontius Pilate
- Neil Alles as Judas
- Nathali Anne Greet as Mary, mother of Jesus
- Prasanna Wickramasinghe as Joseph
- Rosy Senanayake
- Roy de Silva as Caiaphas
- Sathischandra Edirisinghe as Peduru
- Inoka Amarasena as Veronica
- Vishaka Siriwardana as Martha
- Dayananda Jayawardena as 1st Herod
- Sumana Amarasinghe as Herodias
- Samanthi Lanerolle as Bethlehem girl
- Hyacinth Wijeratne as Anna
- Mervyn Jayathunga as 2nd Herod
- Lakshman Mallawarachchi as Thomas
- Baptist Fernando as Annas
- Alexander Fernando as Nikandevumas
- Ananda Wickramage as Joseph of Arimathea
- Tissa Wijesurendra as Simeon
- Vijaya Nandasiri as Shadipathiya
- Vincent Vaas as Vandana Nadaya leader
- Somy Rathnayake as Snawaka Juwam
- Sumana Gomes as Salomi
- Piyatillaka Atapattu
- Senaka Perera
- Arthur Gunawardena as Kireniye Simone
- Ranjan Ramanayake
- Nimal Pallewatte as Soldier
- Wilson Karunaratne as Left side thief
- Premasiri Kalpage
- Suneetha Wimalaweera
