= Vincent Vaas =

Sri Lankan actor (1922–2004)

Vincent Vaas වින්සන්ට් වාස්
- Born: Andara Vaas Patabedige Vincent; November 7, 1922; Kalutara, Sri Lanka
- Died: May 6, 2004 (aged 81); Colombo, Sri Lanka
- Education: Beruwala Roman Catholic College
- Occupation: Actor
- Years active: 1954–2004
- Awards: Rana Thisara Award

Andara Vaas Patabedige Vincent (7 November 1922 – 6 May 2004 වින්සන්ට් වාස්), popularly known as Vincent Vaas was an actor in Sri Lankan cinema. Often considered one of the best character actors in Sinhala cinema, he made several critically acclaimed roles in a career spanned for more than five decades. Apart from cinema, he was also a singer and musician.

== Personal life ==
Vaas was born on 7 November 1922 in Beruwala, Kalutara, Sri Lanka as the seventh child in a family of nine siblings. His father Leon Vaas was a talented violinist. His mother Monica Fernando was a housewife. He studied at the Roman Catholic College in Beruwela.

He was married to Agnes Cooray where the wedding was celebrated in 1959. He first met her at the Wadduwa church. Vincent and Agnes are about 18 years apart. The couple has one sons: Milal and Chinthaka, and three daughters: Virani, Janaki and Inoka.

Chinthaka Vaas studied at Saint Joseph's College, Colombo and is also an actor who acted in the films: Aba, Address Na, Usaviya Nihadai, Ginnen Upan Seethala and television serials: Modara Bambaru, Golu Thaththa and Deyyange Rate. Chinthaka works at Lake House. Chinthaka is married to Asha Madushani. He met her while Chinthaka was singing in church. They have three children: Ginod Joseph, Minod Rafail, and Vindali Marieta.

Towards the end of his life, Vass and his family lived in a small house in Mahabudgamuwa. He died on 6 May 2004 at the age of 81.

== Career ==
He loved drama from the time he was at the school. He took to the streets by singing Christmas carols and gradually became a prominent actor in plays staged in the village huts including; Maraka Dayadaya, Sinhala Kolla and Yuddha Bhoomiya and Veniciye Welenda. However his father thought of rescuing his son from drama mania and sent him to a grocery store in Balangoda to gain experience in retail. After 10 months of being frustrated with the boring life at the grocery store, Vaas came back to the village to achieve his success in drama.

After few years, Benedict Fernando directed him to the performance on the public stage. He had the opportunity to act in the play Bhayanaka Mankollaya co-produced by Benedict Master and Matthias Fernando. It was during this time that Vass emerged as a singer. He received the opportunity to sing the songs Naade Naade, Vida Satana Maala, Ae Mal Uyane, Nimala Sri Saara in Radio Ceylon under the guidance of H. W.W. Rupasinghe and Tabla Master J. A. Podi Appuhamy.

Meanwhile, he met the musician R. Muttusamy who introduced Vass to cinema. Vaas made his debut cinema appearance in the film Ahankara Sthree directed with A. B. Raj with the popular role 'Juwan'. Then his notable role came through the film Sandesaya directed by Lester James Peries. In the film, he played as the 'Sandeshaya Carrier' who later became the prisoner of the Portuguese. Later, he has played a variety of roles in a number of films. In Duppathage Duka, he acted as IGP, a father in Vanamohini and as Muthusami, the boat owner in Ranmuthu Duwa. Then he played as Bandusena in Gatavarayo, as Vijaya's brother in Eya Dan Loku Lamayek, as Nade Guru in Christhu Charithaya, as Nadeeka's father in Vajira and as Kalang's father in Podi Wije and played as Vijay's father in Waradata Danduwam. In the film Uthumaneni directed by Gamini Fonseka, Vass acted as a bedridden paraplegic. From 1954 to 2004, he contributed with more than 70 films across many genre.

In 2002, he was awarded with Rana Thisara Lifetime Award at the 27th Sarasaviya Awards.

== Filmography ==
Year	Film	Roles	Ref.
1954	Ahankara Sthree	Juwan Appu	
1956	Duppathage Duka		
1957	Suraya		
1958	Sepali		
1958	Vana Mohini		
1959	Sirimali	Sirimali's Father 'Maha Rala'	
1960	Sandesaya	Sandeshaya Carrier	
1960	Veera Vijaya		
1962	Ranmuthu Duwa	Muttusamy	
1964	Getawarayo	Bandusena	
1964	Sasaraka Hati	Siriwardena	
1966	Senasili Suwaya	Sumith's father 'Mudalithuma'	
1968	Punchi Baba		
1969	Surayangeth Suraya		
1971	Haara Lakshe	1st beating pariticipant	
1974	Duppathage Hithawatha	Vincent	
1975	Suraya Surayamai	David Appuhamy	
1977	Deviyani Oba Kohida	Elizabeth's father	
1977	Eya Dan Loku Lamayek	Vigilante leader	
1977	Sikuru Dasava		
1978	Veera Puran Appu	Cruel Master	
1978	Bambaru Avith	Anton's friend	
1979	Geheniyak	Charlie	
1979	Monarathenna		
1980	Doctor Susanthaa		
1980	Parithyagaya	Anula's uncle	
1980	Muwan Palessa 2	Mali's father 'Pincha Mama'	
1980	Sankhapali		
1980	Paara Dige		
1980	Sinhabahu		
1980	Uthumaneni		
1981	Beddegama		
1981	Valampuri	Diver	
1981	Vajira	Mudalali	
1981	Amme Mata Samawenna	Vasantha's father	
1981	Dayabara Nilu	Kankanama	
1982	Pethigomara	Sudhira's father	
1982	Ridee Nimnaya		
1982	Sithara		
1983	Ran Mini Muthu		
1983	Niliyakata Pem Kalemi	Music master	
1983	Subodha		
1983	Hasthi Viyaruwa	Korala	
1983	Sister Mary	Caretaker	
1983	Hithath Hondai Wedath Hondai		
1983	Muhudu Lihini		
1984	Walle Thanu Maliga	Peduru	
1984	Deveni Gamana		
1984	Podi Ralahamy	Siyadoris	
1984	Namal Renu		
1984	Hima Kathara		
1985	Araliya Mal	Veda Mahathaya	
1986	Maldeniye Simion	Gammuladani	
1986	Devuduwa		
1986	Aadara Hasuna	Andiris	
1987	Podi Vijay		
1987	Obatai Priye Adare	Mudalali	
1989	Waradata Danduwam		
1990	Pem Rajadahana		
1990	Christhu Charithaya	Vandana Nadaya leader	
1991	Dolosmahe Pahana		
1991	Sihina Ahase Wasanthaya		
1992	Salli Thibunata Madi		
1992	Suranimala		
1992	Sathya		
1992	Rajek Wage Puthek		
1994	Mawubime Veerayo		
1995	Demodara Palama	Simon	
1995	Chandani	Gunapala	
1995	Ayoma		
1996	Sathi		
1996	Amanthaya		
1997	Puthuni Mata Wasana		
1997	Raagaye Unusuma		
1997	Apaye Thappara 84000k		
