= Ahas Gauwa =

1974 film directed by Dharmasena Pathiraja

Ahas Gauwa අහස් ගව්ව
- Directed by: Dharmasena Pathiraja
- Written by: Dharmasena Pathiraja
- Produced by: Mithrarathne Herath
- Starring: Amarasiri Kalansuriya; Swarna Mallawarachchi; Vijaya Kumaratunga; Wimal Kumara de Costa; Cyril Wickramage
- Cinematography: Donald Karunaratna
- Edited by: Jayatissa Dillimuni
- Music by: Premasiri Khemadasa
- Release date: 24 January 1974
- Running time: 110 minutes
- Country: Sri Lanka
- Language: Sinhala

Ahas Gauwa (Sinhala: අහස් ගව්ව)(One League of Sky) is a 1974 Sri Lankan drama film directed by Dharmasena Pathiraja. It stars Amarasiri Kalansuriya and Swarna Mallawarachchi in lead roles along with Vijaya Kumaratunga, Wimal Kumara de Costa and Cyril Wickramage. Music composed by Premasiri Khemadasa.

== Cast ==
- Amarasiri Kalansuriya as Vijay
- Wimal Kumara de Costa as Gune
- Vijaya Kumaratunga as Mahathun
- Swarna Mallawarachchi as Vijitha
- Wickrama Bogoda as Bandu
- Cyril Wickramage as Cyril
- Somasiri Dehipitiya as Somey
- Pathiraja L. S. Dayananda as Daya
- Nilwathuru Wijewardena as Japana
- Shanthi Lekha as Vijay's Amma
- Gamini Ganegoda as Vijay's Thaththa
- Menik Kurukulasuriya as Vijay's sister
- Daya Thennakoon as Sirisena
- Piyasena Ahangama as Magician
- Alexander Fernando as Japana's leader
- H. S. Premendra as Musician
- Malini Fonseka as Post office co-worker
- Bandula Vithanage as Trip friend
- U. Ariyawimal as Police Inspector
- Chitra Wakishta as Silawathie 'Akka'
- Sanet Dikkumbura as Jeep washer
- Bandu Munasinghe
