= Wimal Kumara de Costa =

Sri Lankan actor (1948–2016)

Wimal Kumara de Costa විමල් කුමාර ද කොස්තා
- Born: Wimal Kumara de Costa; 4 July 1948; Kelaniya, Sri Lanka
- Died: 20 November 2016 (aged 68); Colombo, Sri Lanka
- Education: Kelaniya Gurukula Vidyalaya
- Occupation: Actor
- Years active: 1969-2015
- Awards: Best Actor of Theatre Drama Festival 1963

Wimal Kumara de Costa (4 July 1948 – 20 November 2016 as විමල් කුමාර ද කොස්තා [Sinhala]) was an actor in Sri Lankan cinema. He started his career in cinema with character acting in art films, later moving on to comedy roles. He is cited as the pioneer of the Sri Lankan mime industry.

== Personal life ==
Wimal Kumara De Costa was born on 4 July 1948 in Kelaniya, and he completed his education from Gurukula College, Kelaniya.

== Career ==
=== Early days ===
Before entering popular art, he acted in many regional stage shows like Andare, Yakage Kamhala, Sith Peraliya and Diyasena. Costa began his mainstream acting career while attending Gurukula College with a role in the play Godo Enakath directed by A.J. Selvaduray. Subsequently, he performed in plays such as Dunna Dunna Gamuwe, Hitha Hondha Ammandi, Puttu, Kavuruth Yan Ne, Kora Saha Andhaya and Nattukarayo by W. Jayasiri, Sugathapala de Silva and others.

His first experience with film came with a role in Dharmasena Pathiraja's short Sathuro (1969). His first feature was also a Pathiraja film, Ves Gaththo, released the next year. The Pathiraja collaboration would continue through the rest of the 1970s and early 1980s, yielding some of Wimal's most famous roles such as the socialist in Bambaru Awith (1978), the abusive youth in Eya Dan Loku Lamayek (1977) and the disaffected youth of Ahas Gauwa (1974).

Costa won the Award for the Best actor at the 1963 Theatre Drama Festival for the acting in Dunna Dunna Gamuwe.

=== Mime art ===
Costa is highlighted as the pioneer of Sri Lankan mime art. His most notable miming acts are Pemwathaa, Chaaya Roopa Shilpiya, Charlie Chaplin, Inimaga, Magiyek and Adare Wedana. These acts were made by dramatists like Gamini Haththotuwegama, Dharmasena Pathiraja, Sarath Kallepotha and Bandula Vithanage.

=== Gaining Popularity ===
His critically acclaimed performances in these films led to him becoming a much sought-after actor for character roles by other art directors. Sunil Ariyaratne also used him as a whiskey seller in Sarungale (1979), among other roles. Gamini Fonseka featured him in most of his directorial work, such as Sagarayek Meda (1981).

In the 1980s, de Costa began to take lighter roles, which he had occasionally done in the 1970s to a much smaller extent. This would be the period he began to get lead roles in such films as Silva and Jivithayen Jivithayak.

From the 1990s on, he had done mainly small comedic roles in B-movies.

== Death ==
De Costa attended Colombo South General (Teaching) Hospital on 19 November 2016, where he died the next day due to intense respiratory difficulties.

== Filmography ==
- No. denotes the Number of Sri Lankan films in the Sri Lankan cinema. De Costa has acted in more than 100 films, ranging from drama, action, and comedy roles.

| Year | No. | Film | Role |
|---|---|---|---|
| 1969 | 200 | Samaje Sathuro | uncredited role |
| 1970 | 234 | Wes Gaththo | |
| 1972 | 264 | Sihina Lowak | |
| 1973 | 275 | Hathdinnath Tharu | Mr. Perera 'Director' |
| 1973 | 280 | Dahakin Ekek | Chandre's friend |
| 1974 | 282 | Ahas Gauwa | Gune |
| 1974 | 295 | Sagarika | |
| 1974 | 299 | Sanakeliya | |
| 1975 | 316 | Mage Nangi Shyama | |
| 1975 | 325 | Sikuru Liya | Podi Hamu's friend |
| 1976 | 342 | Diyamanthi | Dharma |
| 1976 | 355 | Nilla Soya | |
| 1977 | 364 | Hariyanakota Ohoma Thamai | |
| 1977 | 369 | Eya Dan Loku Lamayek | Siripala |
| 1977 | 378 | Maruwa Samaga Wase | Justin |
| 1977 | 379 | Siripala saha Ranmenika | Justin |
| 1977 | 361 | Sudu Paraviyo | Bimiya |
| 1977 | 363 | Sri Madara | |
| 1977 | 373 | Saja | |
| 1978 | 393 | Asha Dasin | |
| 1978 | 396 | Saara | |
| 1978 | 400 | Bambaru Awith | Weerasena |
| 1978 | 401 | Salee | Justin |
| 1978 | 409 | Anupama | Sima |
| 1979 | 413 | Sarungale | Simon |
| 1979 | 415 | Amal Biso | |
| 1979 | 422 | Wasanthaye Dawasak | Sisira |
| 1979 | 426 | Chuda Manikkaya | Mr. Vicky |
| 1980 | 438 | Mal Kekulu | |
| 1980 | 442 | Kanchana | |
| 1980 | 443 | Silva | Silva |
| 1980 | 444 | Ektam Ge | Martin |
| 1980 | 450 | Raktha | Umari |
| 1980 | 459 | Sankapali | |
| 1980 | 463 | Para Dige | |
| 1980 | 466 | Api Dedena | |
| 1980 | 468 | Mayurige Kathawa | |
| 1981 | 470 | Kolam Karayo | Joseph Silva |
| 1981 | 473 | Ranga | Bonnie |
| 1981 | 475 | Sathweni Dawasa | Bandara |
| 1981 | 476 | Sayuru Thera | Michael |
| 1981 | 481 | Situ Kumariyo | |
| 1981 | 488 | Sagarayak Meda | Drug-using prisoner |
| 1981 | 491 | Badura Mal | |
| 1981 | 497 | Sathara Diganthiya | |
| 1981 | 493 | Geethika | Piyadasa |
| 1981 | 503 | Chanchala Rekha | Podi Mahaththaya |
| 1982 | 505 | Sanda | Nimal |
| 1982 | 509 | Ra Manamali | Podi Mahaththaya |
| 1982 | 510 | Sakwithi Suwaya | Kaputa |
| 1982 | 512 | Bicycle | Samson 'Sam' |
| 1982 | 513 | Adishtanaya | |
| 1982 | 514 | Jeewithayen Jeewithayak | |
| 1982 | 527 | Sithara | |
| 1982 | 532 | Major Sir | |
| 1983 | 545 | Chandira | Anduwa |
| 1983 | 549 | Sewranga Sena | |
| 1983 | 555 | Athin Athata | Wimaldasa 'Wimale' |
| 1983 | 559 | Subodha | |
| 1983 | 560 | Hasthi Wiyaruwa | |
| 1983 | 567 | Samanala Sihina | |
| 1984 | 577 | Walle Thanu Maliga | Albert Mahaththaya |
| 1984 | 576 | Shirani | |
| 1984 | 589 | Bambara Patikki | |
| 1984 | 593 | Sasara Chethana | |
| 1984 | 594 | Wadula | Peithappuwa |
| 1984 | 603 | Sahodariyakage Kathwa | |
| 1984 | 605 | Ara Soyza | Costa |
| 1985 | 621 | Aya Waradida Oba Kiyanna | |
| 1985 | 627 | Sudu Mama | |
| 1985 | 630 | Karadiya Walalla | |
| 1985 | 634 | Kiri Maduwal | |
| 1986 | 635 | Yali Hamuwennai | Prasanna's friend |
| 1986 | 640 | Peralikarayo | Jiney |
| 1986 | 647 | Puja | |
| 1987 | 670 | Ahinsa | Jackie |
| 1988 | 681 | Nawatha Api Ekwemu | Mama |
| 1989 | 694 | Randenigala Sinhaya | Ramo |
| 1991 | 718 | Paaradise | |
| 1991 | 724 | Hithata Dukak Nathi Minisa | |
| 1991 | 738 | Suwadena Suwadak | |
| 1992 | 745 | Salli Thibunata Madi | |
| 1992 | 756 | Umayangana | Jamis |
| 1992 | 764 | Muwan Palasse Kadira | |
| 1993 | 779 | Chaya Maya | |
| 1994 | 797 | Jayagrahanaya | |
| 1994 | 802 | Abiyogaya | |
| 1994 | 803 | Sanda Madala | Ranaa Ayya |
| 1994 | 808 | Mawubime Weerayo | |
| 1994 | 811 | 150 Mulleriyawa | Mantri patient |
| 1994 | 813 | Athma | |
| 1995 | 825 | Rodaya | |
| 1995 | 829 | Wairayen Wairaya | |
| 1995 | 830 | Demodara Palama | Harry |
| 1995 | 834 | Age Wairaya | |
| 1995 | 838 | Hitha Honda Surayo | |
| 1995 | 839 | Cheriyo Captain | Kang-Kung |
| 1995 | 843 | Sudu Walassu | |
| 1996 | 844 | Sathi | |
| 1996 | 848 | Obatai Me Aradhana | |
| 1996 | 853 | Hitha Hodanam Waradin Na | |
| 1996 | 854 | Mana Mohini | John Wayne |
| 1996 | 857 | Hitha Honda Gahaniyek | |
| 1996 | 863 | Cheriyo Darling | Vegemite |
| 1997 | 881 | Apaye Thappara 84000k | |
| 1997 | 883 | Pem Mal Mala | Security officer |
| 1997 | 913 | Rathu Aluyama | Minister Wansanatha |
| 1999 | 914 | Akunu Pahara | |
| 1999 | 919 | Kolompoor | Costapal |
| 2001 | 956 | Hai Hui Babi Achchi | Costa |
| 2001 | 958 | Balakamaya | |
| 2002 | 975 | Sansara Prarthana | |
| 2002 | 989 | Onna Babo | Lengwa alias Ritaa |
| 2004 | 1028 | Bambara Sanakeli | |
| 2005 | 1061 | Alu Yata Gini | |
| 2007 | 1115 | Ai Oba Thaniwela | |
| 2013 | 1193 | Kauda Machan Alice | |
| 2014 | 1205 | Supiri Andare | Ladaruwa |
| 2015 | 1236 | Lantin Singho | Sebastian |
| 2017 | 1285 | Swaroopa | Posthumous release |
| 2017 | 1286 | Sellam Nethnam Lellam | Posthumous release |
| 2017 | 1292 | Dr. Nawariyan | Sumanasiri. Posthumous release |
| 2019 | | Sangile | Posthumous release |
| 2022 | | Rashmi | Posthumous release |
| TBD | | Adda Lanuwa Damma Kodiya | Posthumous release |
