= Rathnawali Kekunawela =

Sri Lankan actress

Rathnawali Kekunawela රත්නාවලී කැකුණවෙල
- Born: George Rathnawali Kumarasiri Miguel; 20 January 1931; Deraniyagala, Sri Lanka
- Died: 7 April 2018 (aged 87); Kiribathgoda, Colombo
- Other name: Menike
- Education: Rathmalgoda Maha Vidyalaya, Polgahawela
- Occupations: Actress, radio artist
- Years active: 1951–2017
- Spouse: David Kekunawela (m. 1957)
- Children: 6
- Parents: Simon Miguel (father); Salina Fernando (mother)
- Relatives: Victor Miguel (brother)

George Rathnawali Kumarasiri Miguel (born 20 January 1931 – died 7 April 2018 as රත්නාවලී කැකුණවෙල) [Sinhala]), popularly known as Rathnawali Kekunawela, was an actress in Sri Lankan cinema, theater and television. One of the earliest pillars in Sri Lankan radio drama history, Kekunawela had a career spanned for more than six decades. She is better known as "Muwan Palesse Menike" due to popular radio play.

== Personal life ==
Kekunawela was born on 20 January 1931 in Deraniyagala as the fourth in the family. Her father was Simon Miguel. He worked as a tea maker in a Deraniyagala Nuri estate. Her mother was Salina Fernando. Her mother died when she was six year old and father died when she was 16 years old. Then she moved Colombo with grandparents.

She has one elder brother - Victor, two elder sisters - Dharmawathi and Prema, and one younger brother Molison. Rathna studied in four schools because of father's job. At first, she went to Beruwala Central College. After that she went to Kadugannawa Madya Maha Vidyalaya, Polgahawela Ratmalgoda Maha Vidyalaya and to a private school in Colombo respectively.

Her elder brother Victor Miguel was also a popular theater actor who acted in Muwan Palessa as "Kadira". Miguel worked as the playwright for second part of popular radio play Muwan Palessa after the original playwright Mudalinayaka Somaratne moved to US when the Janatha Vimukthi Peramuna (JVP) started its turmoil on April 5, 1971. Dharmawathi was married to T.G.W. de Silva who was a Sinhala satirist.

She was married to David Kekunawela, a police officer who worked as a radio operator. The couple first met in 1954 during a family visit in Galle. But David's parents were completely opposed to their relationship and they could not meet for another eight years until 1956. David was in the Royal Air Force at the time. They married on November 29, 1957. The couple has four sons - Nalaka, Thivanka, Ramalika, Indika - and two daughters - Surathi Dasara and Surakshana Oshadhi. Her husband died in 2013.

She died on 7 April 2018 at the age of 87. Her remains laid in her house at No. 25/1 C, Wedikanda Road, Ratmalana for final rites. Funeral took place on 9 April 2018 at Borella General Cemetery at 4 pm.

== Career ==
On April 23, 1951, he launched a radio program called "Yawwana Samajaya". He took Rathna to Radio Ceylon on November 29, 1951, when she was 20 years old. Her first radio play was aired on December 21, 1951, which was based on a short story by T.G. W. de Silva and produced by P. Welikala. In the radio play Maha Ra Hamuwu Sthriya in 1952 with the 63-year-old character "Manchi Kudamma". In the meantime, Ediriweera Sarachchandra and Welikala invited her to join the radio station. Later she became involved in the drama Kurulu Bedda in 1953 with the role "Bandara Menike", and Lama Pitiya and Kantha Sevaya.

On 9 November 1964, she joined Asia's longest-running radio show Muwan Palessa with the roles "Menike" and "Ethana Hami". It was first broadcast on March 12, 1964. The show was very popular and became a hallmark in Sinhala drama history where disciples imagined a village called "Muwan Palessa". Since Muwan Pelessa was only launched in late 1963, the SLBC has no record of it, and the only evidence to show that it was begun on March 12, 1964, was a photo of its founder Somaratne. By the late 1960s it had reached the peak of its popularity. She continuously worked in the play for 50 years along with Wijeratne Warakagoda until resigned due to prolonged illness. The play was adapted to three movies and she acted in all of them.

Her maiden cinema acting came through 1967 blockbuster movie Sath Samudura directed by Siri Gunasinghe. Since then she appeared in more than 30 films particularly in motherly roles. During the shooting of tele serial Sudu Piruwata, Kekunawela was badly injured due to wasp sting. Then the shooting was cancelled for few weeks.

Apart from radio, she also worked with many stage dramas such as Ane Massine, Uthure Rahula and Boralle Gedara. Entering the stage with the drama Uthure Rahula, she became a hotly debated role playing the role of Sirimavo Bandaranaike. While working in the teledrama Korale Mahaththaya in 2017 at Ranminitenna Cinema Village, Kekunawela fell over due to a pain in legs. It was later revealed that it was due to diabetes and induced coma. She has been unable to stop her bleeding after a heart surgery. Since then, she quit from acting.

=== Selected Television Serials ===
- Diya Suliya
- Gimhana Tharanaya
- Hada Pudasuna
- Korale Mahaththaya 2
- Sanda Gomman Re
- Sulanga

== Awards ==
- Presidential Film Awards 1984 - Merit Award (Dadayama)
- Sumathi Awards 2000 - Merit Award (Warna Kambili)

== Filmography ==
Year	Film	Role	Ref.
1967	Sath Samudura	Wimala's mother	
1969	Mee Masso		
1972	Ada Mehemai		
1976	Diyamanthi		
1976	Nilla Soya		
1977	Maruwa Samaga Wase		
1978	Asha Dasin		
1978	Kumara Kumariyo		
1979	Geheniyak		
1979	Wasanthaye Dawasak		
1979	Chuda Manikya		
1979	Muwan Palessa	Menike	
1979	Monarathenna		
1980	Dandumonara		
1980	Paara Dige		
1980	Uthumaneni		
1980	Muwan Palessa II	Menike	
1980	Karumakkarayo		
1980	Bambara Pahasa		
1980	Parithyagaya		
1981	Aradhana		
1981	Dayabara Nilu		
1981	Sathkulu Pawwa		
1982	Kele Mal		
1982	Biththi Hathara		
1983	Chutte		
1983	Dadayama	Rathmali's mother	
1983	Muwan Palessa III	Menike	
1983	Thuththiri Mal		
1984	Batti		
1984	Wadula		
1984	Niwan Dakna Jathi Dakwa		
1987	Kawuluwa		
1988	Angulimala		
1992	Viyaru Minisa		
1995	Ira Handa Illa		
1998	Julietge Bhumikawa	Gossiping dubber	
2006	Nilambare	mother of Nimal and Nirwan	
2009	Paya Enna Hiru Se	Suren's mother	
2015	Bora Diya Pokuna	Bording mistress	
