= Alexander Fernando =

Sri Lankan film actor (1940–2020)

- ඇලෙක්‌සැන්ඩර් ප්‍රනාන්දු
- Born: Joseph Manuel Alexander Fernando; 25 August 1940; Kotahena, Ceylon
- Died: 29 April 2020 (aged 79); Colombo, Sri Lanka
- Education: St. Benedict's College, Colombo; St. Anthony's Boys College Colombo 13
- Occupations: Actor, stunt director
- Years active: 1962–2011
- Spouse: Anoma Lumbini (m. 1978)
- Children: 3

Joseph Manuel Alexander Fernando (Sinhala: ඇලෙක්‌සැන්ඩර් ප්‍රනාන්දු, romanized: Æleksænḍar Pranāndu; 25 August 1940 – 29 April 2020) was a Sri Lankan actor and stunt director in Sinhala cinema. Considered one of the best villains in Sinhala cinema, Fernando acted in over 120 Sinhala films, six Tamil films, and one English film.

== Personal life ==
Fernando was born on 25 August 1940 in Kochchikade, Kotahena, Colombo. He was educated at St. Benedict's College, Colombo, and St. Anthony's Boys College Colombo 13. He was an excellent athlete in wrestling, boxing and swimming during his school years. At the age of 15, he became a member of the Armstrong Wrestling Club, Kotahena. He contested for the Western Province Schools wrestling championship and finished as the runner-up. In addition, he trained in karate, judo and physical fitness. In 1959, after his senior level examination, he joined the harbour authority as a tele-clerk. He gained fame as the undefeated national wrestling champion in 1961 and represented Sri Lanka at the 1962 Commonwealth Games. Fernando qualified for the 1964 Olympic Games in Tokyo and also participated in the 1966 Bangkok Nippon Asian Games. He later lost the opportunity to participate in several global sports tournaments due to a knee injury. He is the only actor in Sri Lanka to have represented his country in sports.

During his acting career, Fernando served as a sports adviser for the Colombo Municipal Council (CMC). He won an award from the Ministry of Sports in 2009 for his contribution to sport.

Fernando was married to Anoma Lumbini from 1978. The couple had two daughters – Anushka and Asha – and one son – Anojan Sudharshana. He resided with his wife at No. 103, Nathuduwa, Kelaniya.

Fernando died on 29 April 2020, aged 79.

== Cinema career ==
Fernando started in drama by acting in Tamil stage plays. He acted in the plays Shalomi and Julius Caesar.

Fernando's maiden cinema acting came through 1963 film Wena Swargayak Kumatada? directed by T. Somasekaran. He served in a stunt role for Henry Jayasena in that film, even though his fight scene was eventually removed from the film. Then he continued to act in several commercial films in lead roles, including Haara Lakshaya, Sri Madara, Rajagedara Paraviyo, Saradielge Putha and Pasa Mithuro. Fernando was a close friend of popular singer H. R. Jothipala, cinematographer Lenin Moraes and the dancer Ronald Fernando.

In 1963, fellow stuntman and actor Robin Fernando invited him to act in the film Ruhunu Kumari directed by W. M. S. Tampoe. In the meantime, he acted in films Ataweni Pudumaya (1968) and Kohomada Wade (1969). He was brought to Hendala Vijaya Studios by film actor Senadheera Rupasinghe to act in the film Ataweni Pudumaya. His film Ruhunu Kumari also came out at that time. After the film became very popular, actor Joe Abeywickrama introduced him to veteran filmmaker Titus Thotawatte to act in the film Haara Lakshaya. In addition to its fighting scenes, his character included many lines of dialogue, the first time that Fernando provided dialogue in a film.

In 1972, Fernando acted in seven Sinhala films. In 1973, Sathischandra Edirisinghe handed over the stunt direction to his film Matara Achchi. Fernando joined with Edirisinghe for the film Sri Madara in 1977, as the lead actor. He also had the opportunity to act in a major role in the 1974 film Sahayata Danny directed by Yasapalitha Nanayakkara. During many villainous roles in the films, he acted opposite Gamini Fonseka in fight scenes. In one instance, he was injured by Gamini and could not open his eyes for three days.

In 1976, Fernando acted as the titular character in the film Saradielge Putha directed by Neil Rupasinghe. During this time, he had the opportunity to play several stage plays under the guidance of Anthony C. Perera and Jayamuni Nimal Silva. In 1983, he acted in the film Pasa Mithuro alongside Mervyn Jayathunga directed by Ananda Hewage. This film was a turning point in his film career, where he performed a realistic role as a Tamil prisoner. In 1984, Fernando won the Presidential Award for this role.

In many films, Sonia Disa played the lover of Fernando's characters. They acted together in many films including Sahayata Danny, Sri Madara, Aege Adara Kathawa, Kawuda Raja and Harima Badu Thunak.

Fernando also acted in Tamil films Yar Aval, Engleil Oruvan, Nangu Lechchami, Rattathi Thirtemme, and the English film Reincarnation.

== Filmography and stunt coordination ==
Year	Film	Roles	Ref.
1963	Wena Swargayak Kumatada?		
1968	Ruhunu Kumari		
1968	Ataweni Pudumaya		
1969	Kohomada Wade		
1969	Surayangeth Suraya		
1969	Uthum Sthriya		
1969	Praweshamwanna	Kidnapping assailant	
1970	Dan Mathakada	Dommie's henchman	
1970	Athma Pooja		
1970	Ohoma Hondada		
1971	Haara Lakshaya	Weerey	
1971	Hathara Denama Surayo	Garage fighter	
1971	Samanala Kumariyo		
1972	Adare Hithenawa Dakkama	Predo	
1972	Edath Suraya Adath Suraya	Alex	
1972	Singapore Charlie		
1972	Ada Mehemai	Assaulted thief	
1972	Hithaka Pipunu Mal		
1972	Veeduru Gewal	Alex	
1972	Miringuwa		
1973	Matara Achchi	City bouncer	
1973	Suhada Pethuma		
1973	Aparadaha Saha Danduwama		
1973	Thushara	Alex	
1973	Gopalu Handa		
1973	Hondama Welawa		
1973	Dahakin Ekek	Dhamme	
1973	Hondata Hondai	Alex	
1974	Ahas Gauwa	Japana's leader	
1974	Sheela	Kidnapper	
1974	Senakeliya		
1974	Sahayata Danny	Samanthe	
1974	Mehema Harida		
1974	Rodi Gama	Game Dimitiya	
1975	Hitha Honda Minihek	Club molestor	
1975	Amaraneeya Adare		
1975	Lassana Kella	Vicky	
1975	Kokilayo		
1975	Suraya Surayamai	Money offerer	
1975	Ranwan Rekha		
1975	Rajagedara Paraviyo	Alex	
1975	Sikuruliya	Bertie's henchman	
1975	Sadhana		
1975	Hadawathaka Wasanthaya		
1976	Kawuda Raja	Sena	
1976	Harima Badu Thunak	Bennet Mahathaya	
1976	Loka Horu		
1976	Adarei Man Adarei		
1976	Saradielge Putha	Sira 'Siri' 'Saradiyelge Putha'	
1977	Sri Madara	Susil Weeratunga	
1977	Aege Adara Kathawa	Siripala	
1977	Maruwa Samaga Wase	Dekkey Kanuwa	
1977	Neela		
1977	Deviyani Oba Kohida?		
1977	Hariyanakota Ohoma Thamai		
1977	Hithuwoth Hithuwamai	Sunder	
1977	Sajaa		
1977	Yakadaya	Chaubey	
1978	Sithaka Suwanda	Thug	
1978	Seetha Devi		
1978	Celinage Walawwa		
1978	Sally		
1978	Apsara		
1978	Sandawata Rantharu		
1978	Hitha Mithura	Michael	
1979	Sawudan Jema	Uranius	
1979	Subhani		
1979	Hari Pudumai	Bandu	
1979	Samanmali	Village lover	
1979	Visihathara Peya	Thanthu	
1980	Anuhasa		
1980	Doctor Susantha		
1980	Raktha	Kopitha	
1980	Api Dedena		
1980	Hondin Inna		
1982	Rahasak Nathi Rahasak		
1982	Sithara		
1983	Thunhiri Mal		
1983	Menik Maliga		
1983	Samanala Sihina		
1983	Pasa Mithuro	Velu	
1984	Thaththai Puthai	Samson 'Paul'	
1984	Batti		
1984	Shirani		
1984	Niwan Dakna Jathi Dakwa		
1984	Birinda		
1985	Araliya Mal	Henchman	
1985	Channai Kello Dennai		
1985	Miss Lanka		
1986	Maldeniye Simion	Mahumahale Mudalali	
1986	Jaya Apatai		
1986	Sura Saradiel		
1987	Kele Kella		
1988	Wana Rejina		
1988	Ko Hathuro		
1989	Badulu Kochchiya		
1990	Christhu Charithaya	Nikandevumas	
1992	Rupathiyay Neethiyay		
1994	Jayagrahanaya		
1995	Hitha Honda Surayo		
1996	Obatai Me Aradhana		
1997	Aege Wairaya 2		
1997	Ninja Sri Lanka		
1998	Sathutai Kirula Ape		
1998	Yudha Gini Meda	Doctor Anand Rajaratnam	
1999	Unusum Rathriya	Inspector Wimal	
1999	Akunu Pahara		
1999	Koti Sana		
2000	Salupata Ahasata 2		
2000	Aege Wairaya 4	Mark	
2001	Kolomba Koloppan		
2002	Kama Suthra	John	
2003	Aege Daiwaya		
2003	Hitha Honda Pisso	Dayapala 'Daya'	
2005	Seethala Hadu		
2006	Supiri Balawatha		
2007	First Love Pooja		
2008	Ai Oba Thaniwela		
2011	Putha Mage Suraya		
