= Biththi Hathara =

Ethumai Methumai බිත්ති හතර
- Directed by: Parakrama de Silva
- Written by: Chandrasena Perera
- Based on: Sugathapala de Silva
- Produced by: Sarasavi Cineroo
- Starring: Neil Alles; Swarna Mallawarachchi; Vasanthi Chathurani
- Cinematography: Parakrama de Silva
- Edited by: Stanley de Alwis
- Music by: Justin Abeywardena
- Release date: 5 November 1982
- Country: Sri Lanka
- Language: Sinhala

Biththi Hathara (Sinhala: බිත්ති හතර) is a 1982 Sri Lankan drama film directed by Parakrama de Silva and produced by H.D. Premasiri for Sarasavi Cineroo. The film was based on the book of the same name written by Sugathapala de Silva. It stars Neil Alles, Swarna Mallawarachchi and Vasanthi Chathurani in lead roles along with Menik Kurukulasuriya and Nadeeka Gunasekara. Music composed by Justin Abeywardena. It is the 536th Sri Lankan film in the Sinhala cinema.

== Cast ==
- Neil Alles as Sepala
- Swarna Mallawarachchi as Samadara
- Vasanthi Chathurani as Mallika
- Menik Kurukulasuriya as Chandani
- Nadeeka Gunasekara as Nandani
- Piyasena Ahangama as Jayasena
- Swarnamali Danthure Bandara as Suneetha
- Devika Mihirani
- Ruby de Mel
- Rathnawali Kekunawela
- Nissanka Diddeniya
- Prasanna Fonseka
- Savithri Weerasiri
- Gamini Wijesuriya

== Songs ==
No.	Title	Singer(s)	Length
1.	"Nimak Nathi"	W. D. Amaradeva
2.	"Atheetha Sihinaya Miya Yanne"	Neela Wickramasinghe
3.	"Sithuwille Sira Madure"	Justin Abeywardena
4.	"Duwa Dimata Kaare Bada"	Nissanka Diddeniya (Noorthi)
