= Shelton Payagala =

Sri Lankan film director and writer

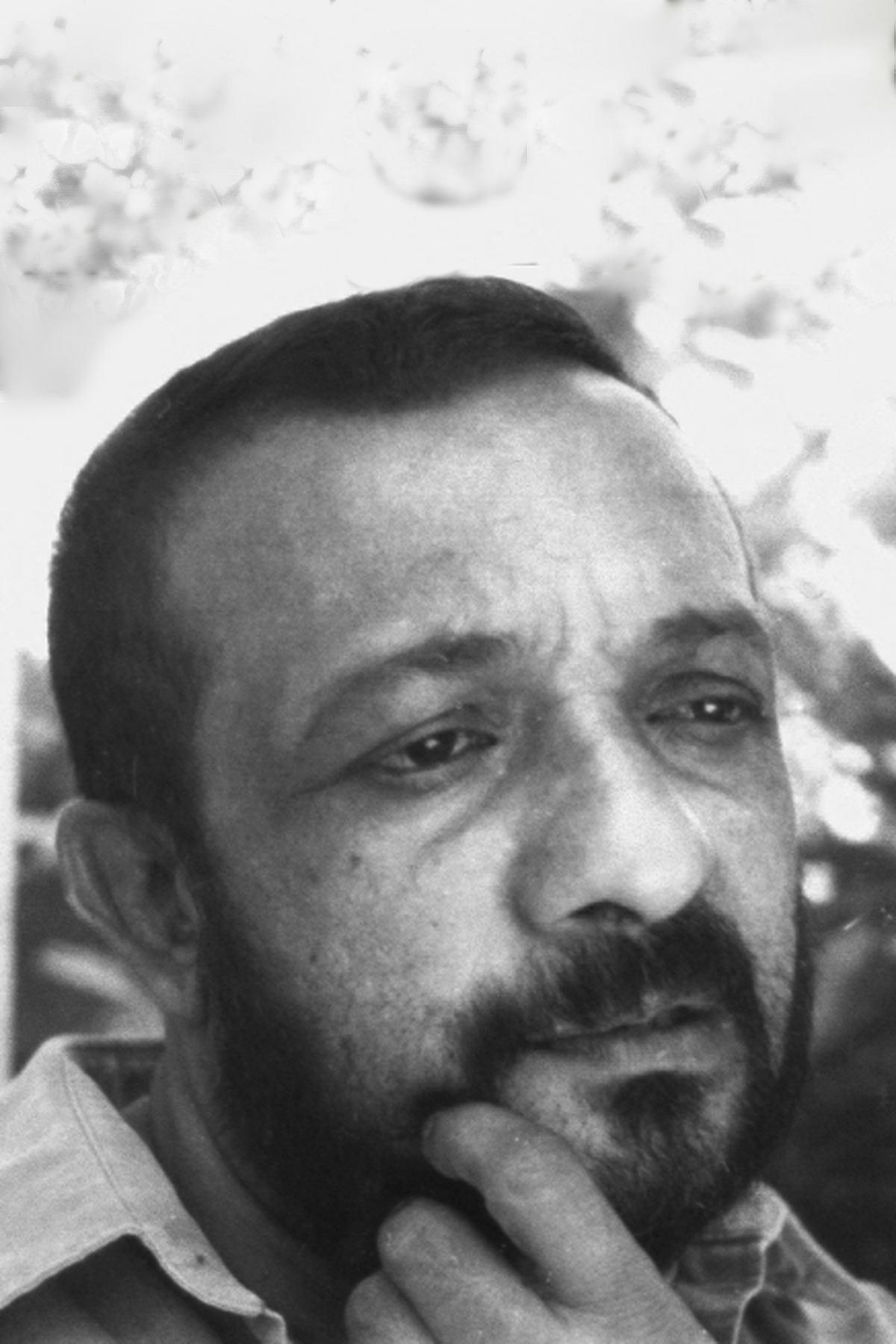
- Born: 1944; Hatton, Sri Lanka
- Died: 23 June 2009 (aged 64); Colombo, Sri Lanka
- Political party: Leftist

Payagalage Don Shirley Shelton (born in 1944 in Hatton, Sri Lanka - died 23 June 2009) was a film director and writer who began as an acting instructor in the mid-1970s.

== Biography ==
Shelton studied at Sri Pada Vidyalaya, Hatton, 1956 to 1960 and Prince of Wales, Moratuwa. He had been an active member in the literature, cinema and stage circles. Following the examples set by literary giants like Martin Wickramasinghe and G B Senanayake, Payagala had started his stint with the art scene by scripting several theater plays and poems. He has conducted several workshops in Film appreciation and Philosophy at the Subodhi Human Development Center in Piliyandala. His influence and teaching were the foundation for a young generation starting a career in art in Sri Lanka.

== Filmography ==
- Golu Muhude Kunatuwa (1991)
- Malata Noena Bambaru (1982)

== Publication ==
- Wisivana Siyavase Wishmaya Charli Chaplin 1st Edition
