= Chitra Wakishta =

Sri Lankan actress (1936–2019)

Chitra Wakishta චිත්‍රා වාකිෂ්ඨ
- Born: Chitra Dhanawalavithana; 23 December 1936; Borella, Sri Lanka
- Died: 31 May 2019 (aged 82); National Hospital of Sri Lanka, Colombo
- Education: Sri Sangamiththa Balika Vidyalaya, Colombo 10
- Occupations: Actress, Dramatist
- Years active: 1953–2015
- Spouse: Lloyd Wakishta
- Children: Ranjan, Shammi, Pran
- Awards: Best Supporting Actress

Chitra Dhanawalavithana (23 December 1936 – 31 May 2019 as චිත්‍රා වාකිෂ්ඨ) [Sinhala]), popularly known as Chitra Wakishta, was an actress in Sri Lankan cinema, stage drama and television. She is best known for her role as Somi Nona in the teledrama Kopi Kade.

== Personal life ==
She was born on 23 December 1936 in Punchi Borella. She completed her education from Buddhist Girls' School, Maradana, which is later known as Sri Sangamiththa Balika Vidyalaya, Colombo 10. She was married to Lloyd Wakisha. Lloyd was also a popular actor in his generation, who acted in stage drama Wes Muhunu and then in films such as Sihina Hathak, Kinkini Paada, Rena Giraw, Baduth Ekka Horu, Mee Masso, Gehenu Lamai, Adhishtana, Thani Tharuwa and Wadula. Lloyd was born in 1930 and died in 1981 at the age of 51. The couple has three sons - Ranjan, Shammi, Pran - and one daughter. Her granddaughter Senuri is also a child artist, who acted in the teledrama Appachchi. Senuri won many awards at local award festivals for her role in that drama.

She died on 31 May 2019 at the age of 82.

== Theatre career ==
Wakishta joined Radio Ceylon in 1945 for Lama Pitiya program. She was involved in singing poems and raban poem in Lama Pitiya at that time. While in Lama Pitiya, she started stage career with A. M. L. Zoysa's drama, Bahirawaya in 1953. Then she acted in many stage productions, such as Deepa, Piligath Warada, Pancha Kalyani and Sargent Weerasinha. In the stage drama Kalagola, she sang the song “Rasadara Siriya Paradana”, which is still a popular theatre song.

== Television career ==
Wakishta is one of the earliest pillars in Sri Lankan television drama history. Her television career started with Sri Lanka's first teledrama Dimuthumuthu. She was a prominent figure in the South Asia's longest running single-episode television serial, Kopi Kade. Her role Somi Nona gained popularity among the public. She continued to perform in Kopi Kade for 26 years, finally she retired due to illness. She also acted in television serials including Vajira, Mal Kekulak Iki Binda and Himagiri Arana.

=== Selected serials ===
- Dimuthumuthu
- Himagiri Arana
- Kawya
- Kopi Kade
- Kula Kumariya
- Mal Kekulak Iki Binda
- Me Suramya Paradisaya
- Mila
- Sihina Sithuvam
- Sisila Ima
- Sudu Hansayo
- Sulangata Medivee
- Suwanda Obai Amme
- Vajira

== Death ==
According to her son Pran, she suffered from cancer since October 2014. She continued to take medication from Cancer Hospital, Maharagama. On 31 May 2019, Wakishta died while receiving treatments at National Hospital, Colombo. Her remains were laid at a Borella private parlour on 1 June 2019 and final rites were carried out on 2 June at the Borella General Cemetery.

== Filmography ==
Wakishta started her film career with Sirisena Wimalaweera's 1955 film Podi Putha. Then she acted in more than 75 films. Some of her popular films include, Golu Hadawatha, Ahas Gawwa, Gehenu Lamai and Yuganthaya. In 1979, she won Best Supporting Actress award for the role in Gehenu Lamai at Presidential Film Festival and then in OCIC Signis Festival.

- No. denotes the Number of Sri Lankan film in the Sri Lankan cinema.

Year	No.	Film	Role	Ref.
1955	34	Podi Putha	Alice	
1957	42	Sirakaruwa		
1966	151	Parasathu Mal	Sirisena's mother	
1966	139	Seethala Wathura		
1967	175	Rena Giraw	Maggie	
1968	186	Golu Hadawatha		
1969	200	Samaje Sathuro		
1969	207	Baduth Ekka Horu	Asilin	
1969	209	Mee Masso		
1969	216	Pancha		
1973	271	Suhada Pathuma	Chamila's housemaid	
1973	277	Sinawai Inawai		
1974	282	Ahas Gauwa	Silawathie	
1975	327	Sadhana		
1975	328	Hadawathaka Wasanthaya	Sriyani's mother	
1978	390	Gehenu Lamai	Kamalawathie Satharasinghe	
1978	388	Vishmaya	Ralahamy's sister	
1980	446	Seetha		
1980	463	Para Dige		
1981	485	Vajira	Jane Nona	
1981	489	Sathukulu Pawwa	Nimali's mother	
1982	514	Thani Tharuwa		
1982	523	Ridee Nimnaya	Teacher	
1983	571	Monarathenna 2		
1985	632	Yuganthaya		
1986	645	Jaya Apatai		
1986	646	Koti Waligaya		
1987	654	Hitha Honda Chandiya	Kusala's Mother	
1987	661	Yukthiyada Shakthiyada		
1987	668	Obatai Priye Adare	Josephine	
1988	679	Durga		
1989	685	Mamai Raja	Ranjith's advisor's wife	
1990	701	Dedunnen Samanaliyak		
1990	705	Saharawe Sihinaya		
1990	709	Palama Yata	Uncle's Neighbour	
1992	742	Ranabime Veeraya		
1992	764	Muwan Palesse Kadira		
1993	774	Prithngyawa		
1993	779	Chaya Maya		
1993	786	Sandarekha		
1993	789	Lagin Giyoth Aehek Na		
1994	803	Sandamadala		
1994	804	Sujathaa	Suranjith's mother	
1995	821	Wasana Wewa		
1995	827	Pudumai Eth Aththai		
1995	839	Cheriyo Captain	Party goer	
1995	841	Chandani	Chandani's mother-in-law	
1995	842	Ayoma		
1996	849	Naralowa Holman	Kosala's mother	
1996	852	Veediye Veeraya		
1997	871	Puthuni Mata Wasana		
1998	890	Gini Avi Saha Gini Keli	Soysa's wife	
1998	902	Julietge Bhumikawa	Gossiping dubber	
2009	1130	Thushara	Wilson's fiancée's mother	

== Awards ==
=== Presidential Film Festival ===
Year	Nominee / work	Award	Result
1979	Gehenu Lamai	Best Supporting Actress	Won
