= Daya Thennakoon =

Sri Lankan actor (1941–2020)

- දයා තෙන්නකෝන්
- Born: Daya Bandara Tennakoon; 29 November 1941; Kandy, Sri Lanka
- Died: 17 April 2020 (aged 78); Maharagama
- Education: Dharmaraja College
- Alma mater: University of Ceylon
- Occupations: Actor, dramatist
- Years active: 1965–2020
- Spouse: Grace Ariyawimal

Daya Bandara Tennakoon (born 29 November 1941 – died 17 April 2020 as දයා තෙන්නකෝන්) [Sinhala]), was an actor in Sri Lankan cinema, stage drama and television.

== Personal life ==
He was born on 29 November 1941 in the small village of Galabadawatta, in Rangala, Kandy. He started primary education at Galabadawatta Primary School and then completed secondary education at Dharmaraja College, Kandy. His father was a tea estate keeper. After school times, he was selected to the University of Ceylon, Peradeniya and graduated with an arts degree.

He was married to fellow actress Grace Ariyavwimal. He met Grace during the 1965 stage play Manaranjana Wedawarjana produced by Henry Jayasena.

Thennakoon died on 17 April 2020 at the age of 78 while receiving treatments at Apeksha Cancer Hospital, Maharagama. The funeral took place on Sunday 19 April at 11:00 am at Thalahena Cemetery, Malabe.

== Career ==
While Thennakoon was studying at the University of Peradeniya, his school as well as university friend Dharmasena Pathiraja invited him to attend several discussions done with filmmaker Sugathapala Senarath Yapa, for his film script Hanthane Kathawa in 1969. Tennakoon was selected for the role "Naatha" in that film, which made his acting debut. He entered the stage through the drama Bosathaneni which was produced by Bandula Jayawardena.

He also worked as a journalist for the newspaper Lassana before entering the cinema.

There were vacancies in the Ceylon Broadcasting Corporation (CBC) when he left the university where he obtained a job there. In 1969, he worked as an Operations Assistant at CBC. During this time however, he was selected for many stage dramas directed by Sugathapala de Silva including Dunnu Dunugamuwe in 1972, Satha Satha, and Pathiraja's Kora Saha Andhaya in 1970. His performance with Malini Weeramuni in Dunnu Dunugamuwe was one of the most spectacular performances the audience has ever seen. He has been mostly involved in the work of university mate Dharmasena Pathiraja. Later he involved in the play Nettukkari by Namel Weeramuni and play Hitha Honda Ammandi by De Silva.

He was promoted to producer of the radio education service. The Japanese Award for Special Evaluation of the Year was awarded in 1979 to the program Muhude Yuddhe by Thennekoon. He acted in the television serial Thattu Gewal, which gained enormous popularity. He was awarded with a merit award for his performance in the film Sakman Maluwa in 2003. Shortly thereafter, he partnered with a television production company called "Cine Video". He was involved in the creation of a number of commercials such as the National Savings Bank and DSI, which were very popular at the time. He directed a number of documentaries and teledramas for Swarnavahini in early years.

It was for the first time in Sri Lanka television that he filmed a song as his concept. It was the first video song ever made for a television media in Sri Lanka. Tennakoon is the pioneer of Sri Lankan television music videos.

He has acted in several supporting roles in many popular films such as Ahas Gawwa, Eya Dan Loku Lamayek, Seilama, Bambaru Avith, Karumakkarayo, Kinihiriya Mal, Sakman Maluwa, Soldadu Unnehe, Swaroopa, Dedunu Akase and 28.

=== Selected stage plays ===
- Bosathaneni
- Deegeka Awith Kandoskiriyawa
- Dunnu Dunugamuwe
- Esala Sandaha Awanhala
- Hitha Honda Ammandi
- Kora Saha Andhaya
- Muthu Kumari
- Nettukkari
- Satha Satha
- The Dictator

== Awards ==
He has received several awards.

- 1st FIPRESCT Critics Award 1994 for the Best Performance – Tharanaya
- 7th Swarna Sanka Cinema Awards 1996 for the Best Supporting Actor – Seilama
- 26th Sarasaviya Award 1998 for the Best Performance – Tharanaya

== Filmography ==
Year	Film	Role	Ref.
1969	Hanthane Kathawa	Naatha	
1970	Wes Gaththo		
1972	Sihina Lowak		
1974	Ahas Gauwa	Sirisena	
1974	Sihasuna	Sirisena	
1976	Walmathwuwo	Gunapala	
1977	Eya Dan Loku Lamayek	Lustful temple worker	
1978	Bambaru Awith	Francis	
1978	Anupama	Hippi	
1980	Kanchana		
1980	Karumakkarayo	Kankanam Mahattaya	
1980	Paara Dige		
1981	Soldadu Unnehe	Soldier	
1984	Wadula	Dingirala	
1992	Sisila Giniganee	Watchman	
1995	Seilama	Hunter	
1995	Maruthaya	Nimal's father	
1997	Tharanaya		
1997	Visidela	Piyadasa	
1998	Anthima Reya		
2001	Kinihiriya Mal	Amadoris	
2003	Sakman Maluwa	Gardener	
2006	Ammawarune	Appuhamy	
2010	Viyapath Bambara		
2014	Swaroopa		
2023	Dada Ima	Ravinath's servant	
2025	Ice Cream		
2025	Walampuri	Chandare	
TBD	Girivassipura		

=== Selected Television Series ===
- Alu Baduna
- Andukola
- Sandagala Thenna
- Sanda Nodutu Sanda
- Thattu Gewal
- Veedi Pahan
- Wes
