= Amarasiri Kalansuriya =

Sri Lankan actor (1940–2023)

Amarasiri Kalansuriya අමරසිරි කලංසූරිය
- Born: 20 September 1940; Kandy, British Ceylon
- Died: 1 April 2023 (aged 82); Ja Ela, Sri Lanka
- Other name: Kalan
- Education: St. Christopher's College; Dharmaraja College
- Occupations: Actor, producer, businessman
- Years active: 1969–2023
- Spouse: Ajantha Thalatha Kumari Ekanayaka (m. 1972)
- Children: 3
- Awards: Best Supporting Actor in Presidential Award (1986); Best actor award (1974)

Amarasiri Kalansuriya (Sinhala: අමරසිරි කලංසූරිය; 20 September 1940 – 1 April 2023), popularly known as Kalan, was a Sri Lankan actor. Kalansuriya made his first film appearance alongside Vijaya Kumaratunga in Hanthana Kathawa. His next film Ahas Gauwa won him a best actor award in 1974.

== Early life ==
Kalansuriya was born on 20 September 1940 in Kandy, Sri Lanka as the second child of the family. His father Kalansuriya Francis Appuhami was a farmer. His mother Bengamuwa Arachchige Podi Hamine was a housewife. Kalansuriya started his school career with Kiribathkumbura Sri Swarnajothi School and then attended Dharmaraja College in Kandy. When studying at Dharmaraja, he was a talented athlete who set the school record for 800m in athletics. He finished second in intercollegiate sports as well as got school colors for boxing.

Kalansuriya worked in the Agricultural Department in Mahiyanganaya as a minor worker. At the age of 18, he served as a soldier in the Second Volunteer Lions Regiment for six years. In 1966 he worked at Mallika Studio in Kandy. He started a business in Kandy in 1970, a sale of old bells. Profiting from this, he started a small sewing company called 'My In' in Kandy. Successful he moved up into tailoring and owned two tailor shops. Here he got the chance to make clothes for the army and rub shoulders with rising political figures like Lalith Athulathmudali.

== Acting career ==
Kalansuriya was chosen as the lead actor for an 8mm film Reyath Dawalath directed by a young man who was a member of the Photographic Society, a student of Kingswood College. Anoma Wattaladeniya played the lead role in this film who later married director Ranjith Perera. She was also a TV presenter. Then on Dharmasena Pathiraja's recommendation, he got the opportunity to act as a university student in the romantic film Hanthane Kathawa directed by Sugathapala Senarath Yapa. He also acted in various roles in Pathiraja's' Ahas Gawwa, Lester James Peiris' Akkara Paha and Ranjith Lal's Nimwalalla as a talented actor.

Kalansuriya accepted an invitation from H. D. Premaratne to star in the film Apeksha in 1978. His second film after the hiatus, Parithyagaya, won him more awards from OCIC and Sarasaviya. He won Best Supporting Actor for Puja in Presidential Award in 1986. Some of the other notable films include: Tharangā, Bambaru Avith, Apēkṣhā, Anūpamā, Poḍi Mallī, Kānchanā, Parityāgaya, Sinhabāhu, Vajirā, Sakvithi Suvaya, Yasa Isuru, Doringē Sayanaya, Poojā, Poḍi Wijē, Ahas Māḷigā and Sāgarayak Mæda. He won the Critics' Award for his performance in Ahas Gawwa in 1974. He won the Sarasaviya Award for Best Supporting Actor in 1982 and Sarasaviya and Presidential Awards for Best Supporting Actor in 1986 for the film Pooja.

Kalanasuriya had a leading role in the first television serial made in Sri Lanka, Dimuthu Muthu directed by D. B. Nihalsinghe. As a theatre actor, he produced and acted in the play Podi Vijay. After another hiatus, Kalansuriya returned to film with Shilpa Denumena in 2001 directed by Rodney Widanapathirana.

Sujith Lakmal Weerasekera wrote an autobiography in 2015 titled Duka Dinū Diviyaka Amaraṇīya Sæmarum Kalan ('Immortal Celebrations of a Life of Sorrow').

== Personal life and death ==
Kalansuriya had one elder brother, Nissanka and two younger brothers, Padmasena and Ariyapala.

Kalansuriya was married to Ajantha Thalatha Kumari Ekanayake. They married on 18 December 1972, and the couple had a son and two daughters. Eldest son Duminda is a businessman and married to Janaki Wijesekara. Two daughters are Madhumathi Kumari who is married to Dr. Dhammika Sedara and the younger daughter, Vindhya, is employed by SriLankan Airlines.

Amarasiri Kalansuriya died at his residence in Ja Ela on 1 April 2023, at the age of 82.

== Filmography ==
Year	Film	Role
1969	Reyath Dawalath	
1969	Hanthane Kathawa	
1970	Akkara Paha	Gunapala
1970	Nim Walalla	
1974	Ahas Gauwa	
1975	Tharanga	
1978	Apeksha	Nimal
1978	Anupama	Ranji
1978	Bambaru Avith	Sanath
1979	Podi Malli	Berty
1980	Kanchana	Lal
1980	Parithyagaya	Dhanaprema
1980	Sinhabahu	Sinhabahu
1981	Vajira	Nimal
1981	Sagarayak Meda	
1982	Pradeepaa	
1982	Yasa Isuru	Suranga
1982	Sakvithi Suvaya	
1983	Samanala Sihina	
1984	Welle Thenu Maliga	
1985	Rajina	
1985	Doringe Sayanaya	
1986	Puja	
1986	Mal Varusa	Deesal
1987	Podi Vijey	
1990	Pem Raja Dahana	Sargent Jayathilaka
1991	Dolosmahe Pahana	
1994	150 Mulleriyawa	
1994	Ambu Samiyo	
1994	Ahas Maliga	
2004	Diya Yata Gindara	Jayakody
2009	Rosa Mal Sayanaya	
2014	Que Sera	
2017	Hima Tharaka	
TBD	Kumaru Chaththa Manawaka	
TBD	Megha	
