= Bambaru Avith =

1978 film

Bambaru Avith බඹරු ඇවිත්
- DVD cover
- Directed by: Dharmasena Pathiraja
- Written by: Dharmasena Pathiraja; Malini Pathiraja
- Produced by: Saranga Salaroo
- Starring: Malini Fonseka; Vijaya Kumaratunga; Joe Abeywickrema; Cyril Wickramage; Daya Thennakoon; Wimal Kumara de Costa; Amarasiri Kalansuriya
- Cinematography: Donald Karunaratne
- Edited by: Sextas Aponsu
- Music by: Premasiri Khemadasa
- Release date: 11 August 1978
- Running time: 160 minutes
- Country: Sri Lanka
- Language: Sinhala

Bambaru Avith (The Wasps are Here) (Sinhala: බඹරු ඇවිත්) is a 1978 Sri Lankan Sinhala drama film directed by Dharmasena Pathiraja and produced by director himself with Thilak Godamanne for Saranga Salaroo. It explores tradition and exploitation following the introduction of capitalism to a tiny fishing village and the subsequent clash between the local boss and the urban outsider.

== Plot ==
In a fishing village, Anton Aiya is an exploiter who outwardly resembles and acts like a regular fisherman, but he exploits and feeds off the other fishermen. In this setting, members of the urban entrepreneurial youth. They have adapted to Western culture, dressing like Westerners and preferring Western music.

Conflict arises between Anton Aiya and Baby Mahattaya (Victor), a representative of the urban youth. A middle-class leftist, Weerasena, is also part of this group. The arrival of these youths has clearly caused a social crisis requiring a solution, and all Weerasena can do is stand on a platform and deliver a speech that no one listens to. He finally leaves for the city.

== Cast ==
- Malini Fonseka as Helen
- Vijaya Kumaratunga as Victor, Baby Mahattaya
- Joe Abeywickrema as Anton Aiya
- Cyril Wickramage as Cyril
- Daya Thennakoon as Francis
- Wimal Kumara de Costa as Weerasena
- Amarasiri Kalansuriya as Sanath
- Somasiri Dehipitiya as Seba
- Ruby de Mel as Celestina, Helen's mother
- Vincent Vaas as Anton's friend
- Daya Alwis as Church father
- W. Jayasiri as Michael
- S. H. Somapala as Christopher
- Piyasena Ahangama as Navy officer

== Music ==
Premasiri Khemadasa composed the music for the film. The two main songs are "Udumbara" and "Handunagathoth Oba Ma."

== Reception ==
=== Critical response ===
Steve Rose of The Guardian, in a 2021 review of a restored version of the film, gave it a score of 4/5 stars. He wrote: "This realist drama from 1978 is well worth the effort, not only because it is a landmark of Sri Lankan cinema... but also because it addresses universal socio-political themes with elegant simplicity." He concluded: "Despite the realist authenticity and political intent, there’s also a gentle sensuality to the story, with soft folk music and moments of tender romance. The characters are believably complex and conflicted, and the sandy, sun-bleached landscape is evocatively portrayed. It feels like a precious snapshot of a place and time rarely glimpsed."

=== Awards and nominations ===
- Sri Lankan representative at 1978 Moscow International Film Festival
- Screened at Mostra and Los Angeles Film Festivals
- Presidential awards for the Best Film and Best Director, 1979
- OCIC awards for Best Film and Best Director, 1979
- Named the fourth Best Sri Lankan Film of the first 50 years by a Presidential council
- Featured in the Cannes Classics 2020, Asian Film Archive's 4K film and sound restoration were done by L’Immagine Ritrovata using the sole-surviving 35mm film positive.
