= List of Sri Lankan films of the 1960s =

Films produced in Sri Lanka in the 1960s.

== 1960 ==
Title	Director	Cast	Genre	Notes
1960
Subhadra	Cyril B. Abeyratne	Dommie Jayawardena, Disna Ranjani, Rohini Jayakody, Anthony C. Perera, Lilian Edirisinghe, Premila Kuruppu, Rosalind Fernando	Drama	Released on 4 February.
Sandesaya	Lester James Peiris	Ananda Jayaratne, Kanthi Gunatunga, Shane Gunaratne, Gamini Fonseka, Eddie Jayamanne, Iranganie Serasinghe, Arthur Vanlangenburg	Drama	Released on 30 March.
Sundara Birinda	T. Yoganandan	Ravindra Rupasena, Clarice de Silva, Leena de Silva, Ananda Jayaratne, Rita Ratnayake, Christy Leonard Perera	Romance	Released on 28 April.
Kavata Andare	B. A. W. Jayamanne	Rukmani Devi, Eddie Jayamanne, Dharmasri Ranatunga, Ruby de Mel, Rudrani Liyanage, Bandula Sri Gunawardena, M. V. Balan	Comedy	Released on 4 June.
Nalangana	L. S. Ramachandran	Rukmani Devi, Ravindra Rupasena, Leena de Silva, Alfred Edirimanne, Eddie Jayamanne, Joe Abeywickrema, Ruby de Mel	Drama	Released on 17 July.
Vanamala	Sirisena Wimalaweera	Aruna Shanthi, Ananda Weerakoon, Alfred Edirimanne, Rani Ranatunga, Kumari Manel	Drama	Released on 7 October.
Pirimiyek Nisa	T. Somasekaran; K. A. W. Perera	Gamini Fonseka, Sujatha Wijesekara, Kingsley Rajapakse, Florida Jayalath, David Dharmakeerthi, Joe Abeywickrema, Joseph Seneviratne	Thriller	Released on 18 November.
Veera Vijaya	K. Sethumadhavan	Jeevarani Kurukulasuriya, Clarice de Silva, Vijitha Mallika, Herbie Seneviratne, Nelson Karunagama, Alfred Edirimanne	Drama	Released on 9 December.

== 1961 ==
Title	Director	Cast	Genre	Notes
1961
Jeevitha Poojava	B. A. W. Jayamanne	B. A. W. Jayamanne, Dharmasri Ranatunga, Mabel Blythe, Shirley Blythe, Dudley Wanaguru, Austin Abeysekera	Drama	Released on 27 February.
Kurulu Bedda	L. S. Ramachandran	Punya Heendeniya, D. R. Nanayakkara, Lilian Edirisinghe, Dayananda Gunawardena, Millie Kahandawala, Nalani Abeypala	Drama	Released on 29 March.
Suvineetha Lalani	Robin Tampoe	Florida Jayalath, Asoka Ponnamperuma, Boniface Fernando, Vijitha Mallika, Darmasri Ranatunga, David Dharmakeerthi	Romance	Released on 12 April.
Ganthera	A. Bhaskar Raj	Stanley Perera, Girley Gunawardana, Eddie Jayamanne, Asoka Ponnamperuma, Lilian Edirisinghe, Jennie Winifrida, M. V. Balan	Drama	Released on 18 August.
Daruwa Kageda?	Herbie Seneviratne	Herbie Seneviratne, Florida Jayalath, Senadheera Kuruppu, Rita Ratnayake, Joe Abeywickrema, Udula Dabare, Premila Kuruppu	Drama	Released on 6 October.
Vedibima	M. P. Gilman	Dharmasri Rantunga, Rohini Jayakody, L. M. Perera, Ralph Wijesekera, Vimala Kumari, M. P. Gemunu, M. P. Gilman	Action	Released on 22 December.

== 1962 ==
Title	Director	Cast	Genre	Notes
1962
Daskon	Upali Wanasinghe	Rukmani Devi, Herbert M. Seneviratne, Gamini Fonseka, Kithsiri Perera, Shane Gunaratne, Nawanandana Wijesinghe	Historical	Released on 7 March.
Sansaare	Shanthi Kumar	Shanthi Kumar, Seetha Jayawardena, Herbie Seneviratne, Dharmasri Ranatunga, Sirimathi Rasadari, Premila Kuruppu	Drama	Released on 12 April.
Suhada Divipiduma	Robin Tampoe	Boniface Fernando, Clarice De Silva, David Dharmakeerthi, Dommie Jayawardena, L. M. Perera, Asoka Ponnamperuma	Drama	Released on 9 May.
Ranmuthu Duwa	Mike Wilson	Gamini Fonseka, Jeevarani Kurukulasuriya, Joe Abeywickrema, Shane Gunaratne, Anthony C. Perera, Vincent Vaas	Drama	Released on 8 August.
Deva Sundari	C. V. Raju	Joe Abeywickrema, Florida Jayalath, Eddie Junior, Lambert Moramudali, Ariyadasa Peiris, Millie Kahandawala	Drama	Released on 28 September.

== 1963 ==
Title	Director	Cast	Genre	Notes
1963
Adata Wediya Heta Hondai	M. Masthan	Gamini Fonseka, Sandhya Kumari, Jeevarani Kurukulasuriya, Ananda Jayaratne, Nelson Karunagama, Vijitha Mallika	Action	Released on 6 March.
Wena Swargayak Kumatada	T. Somosekaran; Kingsly Rajapaksha	Henry Jayasena, Florida Jayalath, Kingsley Rajapakse, L. M. Perera, Bandu Munasinghe, Austin Abeysekara, Dharma Sri Ranatunga	Drama	Released on 2 May.
Suhada Sohoyuro	L. S. Ramachandran; K. A. W. Perera	Stanley Perera, Clarice de Silva, Asoka Ponnamperuma, Rita Ratnayake, Vijitha Mallika, L. M. Perera, Freddie Silva	Action	Released on 14 June.
Mangalika	B. A. W. Jayamanne	Rukmani Devi, B. A. W. Jayamanne, Mark Samaranayake, Senadheera Kuruppu, Eddie Jayamanne, Ruby de Mel, Laddie Ranasinghe	Drama	Released on 26 July.
Udarata Manike	M. Masthan	Jeevarani Kurukulasuriya, Ananda Jayaratne, Alfred Edirimanne, Sandhya Kumari, H. D. Kulatunga, Christy Leonard Perera	Drama	Released on 27 July.
Sudu Sande Kalu Wala	Robin Tampoe	Suvineetha Weerasinghe, Boniface Fernando, Florida Jayalath, Dharma Sri Ranatunga, Dommie Jayawardena, D. R. Nanayakkara	Drama	Released on 4 September.
Sikuru Tharuwa	L. S. Ramachandran	Punya Heendeniya, D. R. Nanayakkara, Milton Nanayakkara, Shelton Gunaratne, H. D. Kulatunga, Millie Kahandawela, S. A. Jamis	Drama	Released on 27 September.
Deepashika	Kingsley Rajapakse	Jeevarani Kurukulasuriya, Sandhya Kumari, Kithsiri Perera, David Dharmakeerthi, Sandhya Kumari, Joe Abeywickrama, L. M. Perera	Drama	Released on 12 December.
Gamperaliya	Lester James Peiris	Punya Heendeniya, Henry Jayasena, Gamini Fonseka, Wickrama Bogoda, Trilicia Gunawardena, Shanthi Lekha, Tony Ranasinghe	Drama	Released on 20 December. Film debut for Tony Ranasinghe. Entered into the 3rd Moscow International Film Festival

== 1964 ==
Title	Director	Cast	Genre	Notes
1964
Heta Pramada Wedi	Shanthi Kumar	Prem Jayanth, Rukmani Devi, Florida Jayalath, Joe Abeywickrema, Sirimathi Rasadari, Henry Jayasena, Asoka Ponnamperuma	Thriller	Released on 31 January.
Getewarayo	Mike Wilson; Tissa Liyanasuriya	Gamini Fonseka, Joe Abeywickrama, Sobani Amarasinghe, Vincent Vaas, Carl Gunasena, Nilmini De Silva, Tony Ranasinghe	Drama	Released on 26 February.
Kala Kala De Pala Pala De	Shanthi Kumar	Ananda Jayaratne, Jeevarani Kurukulasuriya, Dommie Jayawardena, Clarice de Silva, Asoka Ponnamperuma, Shanti Kumar, L. M. Perera	Drama	Released on 3 April.
Dheewarayo	M. Masthan	Gamini Fonseka, Sandhya Kumari, Anthony C. Perera, Ignatius Gunaratne, Hugo Fernando, B. S. Perera, Ruby de Mel	Drama	Released on 10 April.
Sulalitha Sobhani	Robin Tampoe	Ravindra Rupasena, Leena de Silva, Clarice de Silva, Boniface Fernando, David Dharmakeerthi, Joseph Seneviratne	Drama	Released on 15 May.
Suba Sarana Sepa Sithe	T. Somasekaran	Prem Jayanth, Dommie Jayawardena, L. M. Perera, Stanley Perera, Asoka Ponnamperuma, Thalatha Gunasekara, David Dharmakeerthi	Drama	Released on 7 July.
Samiya Birindage Deviyaya	W. M. S. Tampoe	Rukmani Devi, Dommie Jayawardena, Asoka Ponnamperuma, Thalatha Gunasekara, Pearl Cooray, Mark Samaranayake, Dharma Sri Ranatunga	Thriller	Released on 14 August.
Chandali	L. S. Ramachandran	Stanley Perera, Jennie Winifreeda, H. D. Kulatunge, Ruby de Mel, Girley Gunawardana, Benedict Fernando	Thriller	Released on 14 August.
Patachara	Wimalanath Dissanayake	Sandhya Kumari, Ananda Jayaratne, Asoka Ponnamperuma, Aruna Shanthi, Thalatha Gunasekara	Biographical	Released on 10 September.
Samaje Api Okkoma Samanai	Herbie Seneviratne	Dharma Sri Ranatunga, Boniface Fernando, Suvineetha Weerasinghe, Piyadasa Wijekoon, Dommie Jayawardena, L. M. Perera, Nalani Abeypala	Action	Released on 14 October.
Sasaraka Heti	S. Ramanadan	Aruna Shanthi, Asoka Ponnamperuma, Stanley Perera, Jeevarani Kurukulasuriya, Sandhya Kumari, Girley Gunawardana, Vincent Vaas	Drama	Released on 22 October.
Sithaka Mahima	M. S. Ananda	Prem Jayanth, Sandhya Kumari, Asoka Ponnamperuma, David Dharmakeerthi, Christy Leonard Perera, Joseph Seneviratne	Drama	Released on 20 November.
Sobana Sitha	Ariyadasa Peiris	Lambert Moramudali, Pitipana Silva, Lilian Edirisinghe, Saranagupta Amarasinghe, Don Sirisena	Drama	Released on 11 December.
Sujage Rahasa	P. Neelakantan	Jeevarani Kurukulasuriya, Ravindra Rupasena, Leena de Silva, Ananda Jayaratne, Sandhya Kumari, Vijitha Mallika	Mystery	Released on 24 December.

== 1965 ==
Title	Director	Cast	Genre	Notes
1965
Sepatha Soya	B. Nandesena Cooray	Ananda Jayaratne, Sandhya Kumari, Stanley Perera, Thalatha Gunasekara, Dommie Jayawardena, L. M. Perera, Shanthi Lekha		Released on 15 January.
Handapana	Kingsley Rajapakse	Vijitha Mallika, Herbert M. Seneviratne, Piyadasa Gunasekera, Cyril Wickramage, Denawaka Hamine, Ruby de Mel, Cyril Wickramage		Released on 3 February.
Chandiya	Titus Thotawatte	Gamini Fonseka, Anula Karunathilaka, H. D. Kulatunga, Christy Leonard Perera, Karl Gunasena, D. R. Nanayakkara		Released on 18 March.
Sathutai Kandulai	W. M. S. Tampoe	Rukmani Devi, Senadheera Kuruppu, Dommie Jayawardena, Rohini Jayakody, Nita Fernando, Asoka Ponnamperuma, Joe Abeywickrama		Released on 26 March.
Sudo Sudu	Robin Tampoe	Gamini Fonseka, Boniface Fernando, Suvineetha Weerasinghe, Piyadasa Wijekoon, B. S. Perera, Martin Gunadasa		Released on 28 April.
Sama	G. D. L. Perera	Leonie Kotelawala, Denawaka Hamine, Shelton de Silva, Elson Divithurugama, Gamini Wickramasuriya, Vimal Waidyasekera	Drama	Released on 13 May.
La Dalu	S. Ramanathan	Rukmani Devi, Stanley Perera, Laddie Ranasinghe, Vijitha Mallika, Girley Gunawardana, L. M. Perera, Alfred Edirimanne	Drama	Released on 13 May.
Yatagiya Dawasa	W. M. S. Mahendran	Gamini Fonseka, Jeevarani Kurukulasuriya, Ananda Jayaratne, Sandhya Kumari, H. D. Kulatunga, M. V. Balan, Anthony C. Perera	Drama	Released on 18 June.
Saaravita	Tissa Liyanasooriya	Joe Abeywickrama, Sobani Amarasinghe, Jessica Wickramasinghe, Wally Nanayakkara, Thilakasiri Fernando, Piyadasa Gunasekera, Sunila Jayanthi	Drama	Released on 25 June.
Hathara Maha Nidanaya	L. M. Perera	Dommie Jayawardena, Stanley Perera, Dharma Sri Ranatunga, Vijitha Mallika, Girley Gunawardana, Lilian Edirisinghe, L. M. Perera	Mystery	Released on 30 July.
Aadarayai Karunawai	Ananda Jayaratne	Gamini Fonseka, Clarice de Silva, Wijeratne Warakagoda, Wickrama Bogoda, Ananda Jayaratne, Agnes Sirisena, M. V. Balan	Drama	Released on 6 August.
Hithata Hitha	Kingsly Rajapaksha	Herbert M. Seneviratne, Joe Abeywickrama, Vijitha Mallika, Dommie Jayawardena, Asoka Ponnamperuma, Ruby de Mel	Romance	Released on 10 September.
Allapu Gedara	M. Masthan	Joe Abeywickrama, Clarice de Silva, Anthony C. Perera, Sandhya Kumari, Hugo Fernando, Ruby de Mel, Richard Albert	Comedy	Released on 17 September.
Satha Panaha	M. S. Ananda	Gamini Fonseka, Sandhya Kumari, Srinath Basnayaka, Bernard Pathirana, Jayantha de Silva, Joe Abeywickrama, B. S. Perera	Drama	Released on 7 October.
Sweep Ticket	Florida Jayalath, Raja Joshua	Joe Abeywickrama, Florida Jayalath, Vijitha Mallika, Sudesh Gunaratne, Asoka Ponnamperuma, Bandu Munasinghe, Prem Jayanth	Drama	Released on 5 November.
Sonduru Yuwala	L. S. Ramachandran	Stanley Perera, Jennie Winifreeda, Anula Karunathilaka, Girley Gunawardana, Ruby de Mel, Herbert Amarawickrama	Romance	Released on 26 November.
Sekaya	E. Rathnam	Aruna Shanthi, Rita Ratnayake, Tony Ranasinghe, Lambert Moramudali, Manel Perera, Udula Dabare, Eddie Junior, Pitipana Silva	Mystery	Released on 4 December.
Landaka Mahima	W. M. S. Tampoe	Joe Abeywickrama, Nita Fernando, Vijitha Mallika, Ruby de Mel, Lilian Edirisinghe, Mark Samaranayake, David Dharmakeerthi	Drama	Released on 24 December.

== 1966 ==
Title	Director	Cast	Genre	Notes
1966
Seethala Wathura	Dharmasiri Caldera	Gamini Fonseka, Anula Karunathilaka, Shanthi Lekha, Ranjith Dayananda, Ralph Wijesekara, Chitra Wakishta, Wijeratne Warakagoda	Drama	Released on 11 March.
Maha Re Hamuwu Sthriya	K. Venkat	Sandhya Kumari, Alfred Edirimanne, Piyadasa Gunasekera, Christy Leonard Perera, Senadheera Rupasinghe, Pitipana Silva, B. S. Perera	Thriller	Released on 7 April.
Sengawena Sewanella	W. M. S. Tampoe	Vijitha Mallika, Joe Abeywickrama, Prema Ganegoda, Boniface Fernando, Piyadasa Gunasekera, Richard Albert, Piyadasa Wijekoon	Drama	Released on 9 February.
Mahadena Muththa	Robin Tampoe	David Dharmakeerthi, Joe Abeywickrama, B. S. Perera, Richard Albert, Padma Siriwardena, Pearl Vasudevi, Oliver Mayadunna	Comedy	Released on 11 April.
Senasuma Kothenada	K. A. W. Perera	Gamini Fonseka, Jeevarani Kurukulasuriya, Tony Ranasinghe, Sandhya Kumari, Piyadasa Gunasekera		Released on 18 April. Maestro Premasiri Khemadasa's Debut as a music director.
Kolamba Hadayo	Roland Amarasinghe	Lionel Deraniyagala, Piyadasa Wijekoon, Shirani Gunathilake, Dayananda Jayawardena, Senadheera Rupasinghe	Action	Released on 25 April.
Athulweema Thahanam	M. S. Ananda	H. R. Jothipala, Sandhya Kumari, Asoka Ponnamperuma, Piyadasa Gunasekera, Joe Abeywickrama, Rita Ratnayake	Thriller	Released on 1 May.
Sihina Hathak	Nihal A. Jayasinghe	Tony Ranasinghe, Prema Ganegoda, Ruby de Mel, Sandhya Kumari, Marcus Perera, Gamini Wijesuriya, Thalatha Gunasekara	Drama	Released on 2 May.
Delovak Athara	Lester James Peries	Tony Ranasinghe, Suvineetha Weerasinghe, Jeevarani Kurukulasuriya, Wickrama Bogoda, Iranganie Serasinghe, J. B. L. Gunasekera	Drama	Released on 24 May.
Kinkini Paada	Douglas Kothalawala	Prema Ganegoda, Tony Ranasinghe, Wickrama Bogoda, Kithsiri Perera, Nawanandana Wijesinghe, Senadheera Rupasinghe, Piyadasa Wijekoon		Released on 16 June.
Seegiri Kashyapa	Premnath Moraes; Bandu Gunasekara	Gamini Fonseka, Lambert Moramudali, Henry Jayasena, David Dharmakeerthi, Shane Gunaratne, Senadheera Rupasinghe, Don Premaratne	Historical	Released on 7 July.
Kapatikama	K. A. W. Perera	Jeevarani Kurukulasuriya, Oswald Jayasinghe, Joe Abeywickrema, Clarice De Silva, Vijitha Mallika, Lilian Edirisinghe	Thriller	Released on 22 July.
Wesathuru Siritha	Lionel Amarasinghe	Shane Gunaratne, Iranganie Serasinghe, D. R. Nanayakkara, Winston Serasinghe, Dayananda Gunawardena, Lakshmi Bai, Padma Siriwardena	Religious Drama	Released on 19 August.
Sampatha	S. Ramanathan	Rukmani Devi, Senadheera Kuruppu, Dharma Sri Ranatunga, Sandhya Kumari, Piyadasa Wijekoon, Eddie Jayamanne, Sathischandra Edirisinghe	Drama	Released on 11 September.
Parasathu Mal	Gamini Fonseka	Punya Heendeniya, Gamini Fonseka, Anula Karunathilaka, Tony Ranasinghe, D. R. Nanayakkara, Sirimathi Rasadari	Drama	Released on 26 September.
Sudu Duwa	Raja Joshua; Lenin Moraes	Stanley Perera, Florida Jayalath, Dommie Jayawardena, Sandhya Kumari, D. R. Nanayakkara, Asoka Ponnamperuma, Vijitha Mallika	Drama	Released on 18 October.
Sanda Nega Eddi	Hector Jayasinghe	Hector Jayasinghe, Vijitha Mallika, Asoka Ponnamperuma, Dayananda Gunawardena, B. S. Perera, Don Sirisena, Bandu Munasinghe	Drama	Released on 22 November.
Oba Dutu Da	S. Sivananda	Gamini Fonseka, Jeevarani Kurukulasuriya, Sandhya Kumari, Hugo Fernando, Iranganie Serasinghe, Anthony C. Perera, Shanthi Lekha	Romance	Released on 23 November.
Senasili Suwaya	Robin Tampoe	Gamini Fonseka, Jeevarani Kurukulasuriya, Roy de Silva, Sandhya Kumari, Asoka Ponnamperuma, Shanthi Lekha, Vijitha Mallika	Drama	Released on 14 December.
Layata Laya	W. M. S. Tampoe	Vijitha Mallika, Dommie Jayawardena, Asoka Ponnamperuma, Nita Fernando, Lilian Edirisinghe, Seetha Kumari	Drama	Released on 29 December.

== 1967 ==
Title	Director	Cast	Genre	Notes
1967
Hathara Kendare	L. M. Perera	Stanley Perera, Jeevarani Kurukulasuriya, Vijitha Mallika, Dommie Jayawardena, David Dharmakeerthi, Senadheera Kuruppu, Shirani Kurukulasuriya	Drama	Released on 23 January.
Sorungeth Soru	Mike Wilson	Gamini Fonseka, Jeevarani Kurukulasuriya, Joe Abeywickrama, Liz Wilson, Rodney Jonklaas, Paul Eichmann, Peter Donaldson, Chris Greet	Thriller	Released on 31 January.
Sath Samudura	Siri Gunasinghe	Swarna Mallawarachchi, Cyril Wickramage, Denawaka Hamine, Edmund Wijesinghe, Leena Fernando, Hemamali Gunasinghe, Rathnawali Kekunawela	Drama	Released on 22 February. Film debut for Swarna Mallawarachchi.
Manamalayo	T. Bhawanandan	Tony Ranasinghe, Joe Abeywickrama, Shirani Kurukulasuriya, Udula Dabare, Sunila Jayanthi, Hugh Perera, Vijaya Kumaratunga	Comedy	Released on 7 March.
Daru Duka	Dommie Jayawardena	Anula Karunathilaka, Dommie Jayawardena, Joe Abeywickrama, Lilian Edirisinghe, S. H. Jothipala, Piyadasa Gunasekera, M. A. Simeon	Drama	Released on 8 March.
Sengawunu Menika	Dudley Wanaguru	Vijitha Mallika, Roy de Silva, Dudley Wanaguru, Laddie Ranasinghe, Lilian Edirisinghe, Shirani Gunasekara, Hilda Agnes	Romance	Released on 7 April.
Pipena Kumudu	Ruby de Mel	Rukmani Devi, Alfred Edirimanne, Ruby De Mel, Sumana Amarasinghe, Mark Samaranayake, Anthony C. Perera, Nawanandana Wijesinghe	Drama	Released on 12 April.
Amathaka Unada	D. M. Dias	Stanley Perera, Dommie Jayawardena, Vijitha Mallika, Rita Ratnayake, Ravindra Rupasena, Pitipana Silva, H. D. Kulatunga	Drama	Released on 12 April.
Ran Salu	Lester James Peiris	Punya Heendeniya, Tony Ranasinghe, Anula Karunathilaka, Iranganie Serasinghe, Dayananda Gunawardena, J. B. L. Gunasekera, Sobashini Atukorale	Romance	Released on 30 April.
Magul Poruwa	B. A. W. Jayamanne	B. A. W. Jayamanne, Rukmani Devi, Mark Samaranayake, Ruby de Mel, Grace Jayamanne, Sandhya Kumari, H. D. Kulatunga, Oswald Jayasinghe	Romance	Released on 22 May.
Sarana	Ashoka David	Vijitha Mallika, Prem Jayanth, Eddie Jayamanne, H. D. Kulatunga, Mabel Blythe, Udula Dabare, Senadheera Rupasinghe, Lilian Edirisinghe	Drama	Released on 12 June.
Sarubima	L. S. Ramachandran	Jennie Winifreeda, D. R. Nanayakkara, Denawaka Hamine, Milton Jayawardena, Shanthi Lekha, Herbert Amarawickrama, H. D. Kulatunga	Drama	Released on 12 July.
Sadol Kandulu	Reggie Perera; G. D. L. Perera	Tony Ranasinghe, Anula Karunathilaka, Joe Abeywickrama, Manel Jayasena, Denawaka Hamine, Piyadasa Gunasekera, Sathischandra Edirisinghe	Drama	Released on 31 July.
Vasanthi	Ananda Wickckramasinghe; Yasapalitha Nanayakkara	Tony Ranasinghe, Anula Karunathilaka, Prema Ganegoda, B. S. Perera, Nawanandana Wijesinghe, Shanthi Lekha, Elson Divithurugama, Lionel Algama	Drama	Released on 10 August.
Ran Rasa	E. Rathnam	Asoka Ponnamperuma, Leena de Silva, Sandhya Kumari, Eddie Junior, Anthony C. Perera, Vijitha Mallika, Joseph Seneviratne	Drama	Released on 24 August.
Ipadune Eyi	S. Ramanathan	Gamini Fonseka, Jeevarani Kurukulasuriya, Sandhya Kumari, Asoka Ponnamperuma, Anthony C. Perera, Shanthi Lekha, Rohini Jayakody	Drama	Released on 31 August.
Iwasana Dana	W. A. Jayasinghe	Eddie Yapa, Stanly Perera, Clarice De Silva, Asoka Hewawitharana, Asoka Ponnamperuma, David Dharmakeerthi, Girley Gunawardana, Denawaka Hamine	Drama	Released on 22 September.
Rena Giraw	Dharmasiri Caldera	Gamini Fonseka, Vijitha Mallika, Piyadasa Gunasekera, Jessica Wickramasinghe, Ranjith Dayananda, H. D. Kulatunga, A. P. Gunaratne	Drama	Released on 14 October.
Okkoma Hari	Wijepala Hettiarachchi	Gamini Fonseka, Jeevarani Kurukulasuriya, Sandhya Kumari, Anthony C. Perera, Nelson Karunagama, Thalatha Gunasekara	Drama Comedy	Released on 23 October.
Hitha Giya Thena	Herbert Rupasinghe	Punya Heendeniya, Chandan Guneratne, Rohini Jayakody, Mala Ellawala, Neeta Atukorale, Piyadasa Gunasekera, L. M. Perera, Mark Samaranayake	Romance	Released on 1 December.
Soora Chauraya	M. Masthan	Gamini Fonseka, Sandhya Kumari, Hugo Fernando, Anthony C. Perera, Rohini Jayakody, H. D. Kulatunga, Shanthi Lekha	Action Thriller	Released on 21 December.

== 1968 ==
Title	Director	Cast	Genre	Notes
1968
Sudusu Da	Roland Amarasinghe	Robert McCloud, Padma Siriwardena, Kumar Amarasinghe, Dayananda Jayawardena	Drama	Released on 12 January.
Pinibindu	Chula Palagolla	Sandhya Kumari, Aruna Shanthi, Piyadasa Gunasekera, Shanthi Lekha, Robin Fernando, Theresa Weerasinghe, H. R. Jothipala	Drama	Released on 3 February.
Singithi Surathal	Kingsley Rajapakse	Tony Ranasinghe, Jeevarani Kurukulasuriya, Vijitha Mallika, Thalatha Gunasekara, David Dharmakeerthi, Agnes Sirisena	Drama	Released on 3 February.
Punchi Baba	Tissa Liyanasooriya	Joe Abeywickrama, Malini Fonseka, Anula Karunathilaka, David Dharmakeerthi, Anthony C. Perera, Vincent Vaas, Thilakasiri Fernando	Drama	Released on 26 February. Film debut for Malini Fonseka.
London Hamu	Chundukili Somasekaran	Asoka Ponnamperuma, Vijitha Mallika, Stanley Perera, Clarice de Silva, Denawaka Hamine, Lilian Edirisinghe, M. V. Balan	Drama	Released on 4 March.
Abuddassa Kale	Kumar Wickramasooriya	Rukmani Devi, Malini Fonseka, D. R. Nanayakkara, Eddie Jayamanne, Vijitha Mallika, D. M. Colombage, Lilian Edirisinghe	Drama	Released on 25 March.
Mathru Bhumi	Wimalanath Dissanayaka	Asoka Hewawitharana, Ralph Wijesekara, Chandra Kala, Bertram Fernando, M. P. Gemunu, M. A. Simeon, S. Ahangama, Ranjith Bogoda	Action	Released on 11 April.
Golu Hadawatha	Lester James Peiris	Anula Karunathilaka, Wickrama Bogoda, Sriyani Amarasena, Wijeratne Warakagoda, Sudesh Gunaratne, Grace Jayamanne, Mapa Gunaratne	Romance	Released on 24 April. Film debut for Sriyani Amarasena.
Akka Nago	Vincent David	Stanley Perera, Sandhya Kumari, Joe Abeywickrama, Dommie Jayawardena, D. R. Nanayakkara, David Dharmakeerthi, Piyadasa Wijekoon	Drama	Released on 2 May.
Bicycle Hora	K. A. W. Perera	Sandhya Kumari, Oswald Jayasinghe, D. R. Nanayakkara, Jeevarani Kurukulasuriya, Wally Nanayakkara, Gemunu Wijesuriya	Thriller	Released on 26 May.
Vanasara	L. S. Ramachandran, S.A. Somarathne	Roy Handapangoda, D. R. Nanayakkara, Shirani Gunathilake, Denawaka Hamine, Vincent Vaas, Pitipana Silva, Stanley Perera	Action	Released on 27 June.
Amathikama	Nihal Jayasinghe	Joe Abeywickrama, Hugo Fernando, Sandhya Kumari, D.R. Nanayakkara, Pearl Vasudevi, Jessica Wickramasinghe	Drama	Released on 22 July.
Hangi Hora	Rohini Jayakodi	Tony Ranasinghe, Sandhya Kumari, D. R. Nanayakkara, Dommie Jayawardena, Rohini Jayakody, Asoka Ponnamperuma, Don Sirisena	Comedy	Released on 30 July.
Indunila	Kingsley Rajapakse	Tony Ranasinghe, Jeevarani Kurukulasuriya, Asoka Ponnamperuma, D. R. Nanayakkara, David Dharmakeerthi, Robin Fernando	Drama	Released on 26 August.
Ruhunu Kumari	W. M. S. Tampoe	Nita Fernando, Hugo Fernando, Roy de Silva, Anthony C. Perera, Dommie Jayawardena, B. S. Perera, Stanley Perera	Comedy	Released on 14 September.
Dahasak Sithuvili	G. D. L. Perera	Henry Jayasena, Nilanthi Wijesinghe, Joe Abeywickrama, Malini Fonseka, Denawaka Hamine, Dhamma Wanniwarachchi	Romance	Released on 20 September.
Dehadaka Duka	Robin Tampoe	Gamini Fonseka, Vijitha Mallika, Ananda Jayaratne, Asoka Ponnamperuma, Leena Fernando, Shanthi Lekha, David Dharmakeerthi	Drama	Released on 23 October.
Aadarawanthayo	Amaranath Jayathilake	Tony Ranasinghe, Malini Fonseka, D. R. Nanayakkara, Joe Abeywickrama, Wally Nanayakkara, Michael Subasinghe	Romance	Released on 24 November.
Wahal Doopatha	Shanthi Abesekara	Shanthi Abeysekara, Chandra Kala, Ralph Wijesekara, Piyadasa Wijekoon, M. S. Beliatta, Austin Abeysekara, Sunil Soma Peiris	Thriller	Released on 1 December.
Ataweni Pudumaya	M. Masthan	Joe Abeywickrama, Sandhya Kumari, Clarice de Silva, Senadheera Rupasinghe, Thalatha Gunasekara, D. R. Nanayakkara, Shanthi Lekha	Drama	Released on 21 December.

== 1969 ==
Title	Director	Cast	Genre	Notes
1969
Senehasa	Herbert M. Seneviratne	Herbert M. Seneviratne, Jeevarani Kurukulasuriya, Wally Nanayakkara, Janaki Kurukulasuriya, Joe Abeywickrama, Sumith Bibile, Edna Sugathapala	Drama	Released on 19 January.
Samaja Sathuro	T. Somasekaran	Wally Nanayakkara, Sunila Jayanthi, Wijeratne Warakagoda, Samuel Rodrigo, Sirimathi Rasadari, D. M. Colombage, Chitra Wakishta	Action	Released on 14 February 1969
Oba Nethinam	M. V. Balan	Gamini Fonseka, Anula Karunathilaka, Baptist Fernando, Vijitha Mallika, B. S. Perera, Christy Leonard Perera, Nelson Karunagama	Drama	Released on 27 February.
Kohomada Wede	S. Ramanathan	Clarice de Silva, Asoka Ponnamperuma, Oswald Jayasinghe, Anthony C. Perera, Thalatha Gunasekara, B. S. Perera, Christy Leonard Perera	Drama	Released on 5 March.
Narilatha	Tissa Liyanasuriya	Tony Ranasinghe, Anula Karunathilaka, Sandhya Kumari, Joe Abeywickrama, H. D. Kulatunga, Shanthi Lekha, Kithsiri Perera	Drama	Released on 22 March.
Kauda Hari	Titus Thotawatte	Malini Fonseka, D. R. Nanayakkara, Dommie Jayawardena, Sandhya Kumari, Karu Nanayakkara, David Dharmakeerthi, Benjamin Fernando	Drama	Released on 11 April.
Hari Maga	D. M. Dias	Tony Ranasinghe, Sonia Disa, Lionel Deraniyagala, Marcus Perera, H. D. Kulatunga, Ruby de Mel, Senadheera Rupasinghe	Drama	Released on 22 April.
Hathara Peraliya	L. M. Perera	Stanley Perera, Roy de Silva, Sumana Amarasinghe, Girley Gunawardana, Robin Fernando, L. M. Perera, Jessica Wickramasinghe	Comedy	Released on 22 May.
Baduth Ekka Horu	Ranjith Senaweera	Joe Abeywickrama, Janaki Kurukulasuriya, Piyadasa Gunasekera, Gamini Fonseka, Wally Nanayakkara, Piyadasa Wijekoon, Chitra Wakishta	Thriller	Released on 17 June.
Mee Masso	Dharmasiri Caldera	Gamini Fonseka, Ananda Jayaratne, Anula Karunathilaka, Janaki Kurukulasuriya, Lionel Deraniyagala, Sonia Disa, Nita Fernando	Drama	Released on 10 July.
Surayangeth Suraya	Lenin Moraes	Gamini Fonseka, Sandhya Kumari, Senadheera Rupasinghe, Edna Sugathapala, Sonia Disa, Anthony C. Perera, H. D. Kulatunga	Action	Released on 4 August.
Binaramalee	Mudalinayaka Somarathne	Swarna Kahawita, Wickrama Bogoda, Piyadasa Gunasekera, D. R. Nanayakkara, Mudalinayaka Somaratne, Shanthi Lekha, Gemunu Wijesuriya	Thriller	Released on 19 August. First Sri Lankan movie based on a radio drama. Adapted from Muwan Palessa broadcast by the Sri Lanka Broadcasting Corporation (SLBC).
Pick Pocket	Robin Tampoe	Wally Nanayakkara, Nita Fernando, Leena Fernando, Asoka Ponnamperuma, Pearl Vasudevi, B. S. Perera, Richard Albert	Thriller	Released on 22 September.
Uthum Sthriya	K. Venkat	Joe Abeywickrama, Clarice de Silva, Roy de Silva, H. D. Kulatunga, Shanthi Lekha, Pearl Vasudevi, Pitipana Silva	Drama	Released on 15 October.
Prawesam Wanna	M. S. Ananda	Tony Ranasinghe, Malini Fonseka, Shyama Ananda, Joe Abeywickrama, Lilian Edirisinghe, David Dharmakeerthi	Drama	Released on 6 November.
Para Walalu	Sudas Maskorala	Gamini Fonseka, Anula Karunathilaka, Joe Abeywickrama, Malini Fonseka, Eddie Jayamanne, Rukmani Devi, Kithsiri Perera	Thriller	Released on 29 November.
Pancha	Vincent David	Joe Abeywickrama, Clarice de Silva, Anthony C. Perera, D. R. Nanayakkara, Vijitha Mallika, Asoka Ponnamperuma, B. S. Perera	Comedy	Released on 15 December.
Mokada Une?	Piyasiri Gunarathne	Anula Karunathilaka, Cyril Wickramage, Horana Hamine, Pujitha Mendis, Elson Divithurugama, Chandra Kaluarachchi, Nawanandana Wijesinghe	Drama	Released on 18 December.
Romeo Juliet Kathawak	G. D. L. Perera	Douglas Ranasinghe, Rukmani Devi, Piyadasa Gunasekera, Joe Abeywickrama, Iranganie Serasinghe, D. R. Nanayakkara, Vijaya Kumaratunga	Romance	Released on 21 December.
Hanthane Kathawa	Sugathapala Senarath Yapa	Vijaya Kumaratunga, Swarna Mallawarachchi, Tony Ranasinghe, Amarasiri Kalansuriya, J. B. L. Gunasekera, Sobani Amarasinghe, Sunila Jayanthi	Romance	Released on 30 December. Film debut for Vijaya Kumaratunga.
Bakmaha Deege	Dayananda Gunawardena	Iranganie Serasinghe, Anula Karunathilaka, Daniel Muthumala, Elson Divithurugama, Dharmasiri Bandaranayake, Chandra Kaluarachchi, D. R. Nanayakkara	Drama	Released on 31 December.

== See also ==
- Cinema of Sri Lanka
- List of Sri Lankan films
