= Anthony C. Perera =

Sri Lankan actor, screenplay writer and comedian

- ඇන්තනී සී. පෙරේරා
- Born: Mahapatabadige Anthony Crisman Kivlojiyas Perera; 13 September 1921; Chilaw, British Ceylon
- Died: 20 May 1988 (aged 66); Ja-Ela, Sri Lanka
- Resting place: Tudella Cemetery, Ja-Ela
- Education: Roman Catholic College, Tudella; Roman Catholic College, Bulupitiya
- Occupations: Actor, screenplay writer, director, assistant director
- Years active: 1941–1988

Mahapatabadige Anthony Crisman Kivlojiyas Perera (13 September 1921 – 20 May 1988 as ඇන්තනී සී. පෙරේරා) [Sinhala]), popularly known as Anthony C. Perera, was an actor in Sri Lankan cinema and theater. One of the earliest pillars in Sri Lankan film history, Perera also worked as a singer, screenplay writer and director in a career spanning more than four decades.

== Personal life ==
Perera was born on 13 September 1921 in a small village of Mahawewa Vee Hena, Chilaw, in Puttalam as the eldest child of the family. His father Mahapatabedige Logus Perera was born in Tudella, Ja-Ela, who worked as a plantation administrator. His mother was Warnasuriyage Theodora Tissera. He entered Mahawewa Junior School for primary education and then moved to Tudella Roman Catholic College (currently known as Christ King College, Tudella) for further education. With his father's transfer to a new plantation in Kurunegala, Perera shifted to Budupitiya Roman Catholic School which was about 7 miles from Kurunegala.

Perera has one younger brother, Wilfred and one younger sister, Beatrice. Wilfred later became a distinguished teacher at St. Benedict's College, Kotahena and produced several popular figures, including; Vijaya Kumaratunga, Ravindra Randeniya and Robin Fernando.

He married Modarage Mary Vaas in 1953. The couple has five daughters – Menaka, Deepthika, Gaurika, Chaudry, Sherine – and two sons – Rohana and Emil. His elder son Rohana died at a young age in an accident.

Perera died on 20 May 1988 at the age of 66 and was buried in Thudella Cemetery, Ja-Ela.

== Career ==
After finishing school career in brief years, he moved to his ambition to be an actor. Anthony went to find Laddie Ranasinghe to be a stage actor and joined with Ranasinghe's Arcadians Drama Troupe. Meantime, Laddie introduced Perera to one of his colleagues, P.D.S. Kularatne, who worked as the principal of Ananda College, Colombo. Kularatne has set up a theater club called "National" in Maradana and he joined Perera for his newest drama Aewessa Bena.

However after that play, he refused to act in further and applied to the Ceylon Army and Race Horse. He received calls to come to both on the same day. In 1942, Perera got the opportunity to join the British Army. For five and a half years, Perera fought with the forces of the Allies against the enemy in the jungles of the desert. After returning to Sri Lanka, he joined the public service. He worked in Kurunegala Kachcheri for a brief period and then joined as an agent for Brookbond Company, Colombo. There he joined the 1953 Hartal to seek professional rights. He was a hard leftist at the time. Due to the continuous Hartal, Brookbond manager transferred Anthony to Negombo branch of the company. He also worked as the production manager of Vijaya Studios in Hendala.

After many years in civil service, Perera met one of his friends, H. M. L. Tissera, who owns Ratnavali Cinema, Ja-Ela. Tissera introduced Perera to K. Gunaratnam, who owns Cinemas Film Corporation. During that time, Perera met Hugo Fernando and got the opportunity to act in the film Suraya co-directed by Indian filmmakers S. V. Krishna Reddy and T. R. Sundaram. Then he acted in many popular films such as Wana Mohini, Sandesaya, Weera Vijaya and Ranmuthu Duwa. He has acted more than 70 films across many genres from character roles to comedy roles. In 1965, Perera introduced Sonia Disa into Sinhala Cinema.

He acted many comedy roles in films Hathara Denama Surayo, Edath Suraya Adath Suraya, Allapu Gedara, Chandiya and Singapore Charlie. He acted in five different roles in the film Hondama Welawa. He starred in the film Singapore Charlie wearing a wig and also worked as the dialogue writer. In 1980, he made screenplay, story and dialogue and directed the film Hondin Inna. After 1977, he did not receive many films. During this free period, he enjoyed reading Paddle Chase novels. In 1986, he produced the stage play Yama Lowa Peraliya.

== Filmography ==
Year	Film	Role	Ref.
1956	Duppathage Duka		
1957	Suraya		
1957	Surasena	Elderly Surasena	
1958	Sepali		
1958	Wana Mohini		
1960	Subhadra		
1960	Sandesaya	Town crier	
1960	Veera Vijaya		
1962	Ranmuthu Duwa	Bandu's uncle	
1963	Adata Vediya Heta Hondai		
1964	Sasaraka Hati	Match maker	
1964	Dheewarayo		
1965	Allapu Gedara	Yattalagoddage Chandra Udadeniya	
1965	Chandiya	Andaya	
1965	Yata Giya Dawasa		
1966	Oba Dutu Da		
1967	Pipena Kumudu		
1967	Okkoma Hari		
1967	Sura Chauraya		
1967	Saru Bima		
1967	Ran Rasa	Perera	
1967	Ipadune Ai?		
1968	Ataweni Pudumaya		
1968	Punchi Baba	Sena's friend	
1968	Ruhunu Kumari		
1969	Kohomada Wade		
1969	Pancha		
1969	Surayangeth Suraya		
1970	Dan Mathakada?	Michael	
1970	Athma Pooja		
1970	Thevatha		
1970	Seda Sulang		
1971	Hathara Denama Surayo	Jaggi	
1972	Adare Hithenawa Dakkama	Valentino	
1971	Seeye Nottuwa		
1972	Edath Suraya Adath Suraya	Johnny	
1972	Singapore Charlie	Singapuru Charlie	
1972	Ada Mehemai	Sira	
1973	Hondama Welawa		
1973	Hondata Hondai	Chandana's friend	
1973	Aparadhaya Ha Danduwama		
1973	Gopalu Handa		
1974	Sihasuna		
1974	Jeewana Ganga		
1974	Mehema Harida		
1975	Awa Soya Adare		
1975	Suraya Surayamai	Batta 'Batson'	
1975	Jeewana Geethaya		
1975	Lassana Dawasak	Anthony 'Anto'	
1975	Lassana Kella	Caldera	
1975	Gijulihiniyo		
1976	Saradielge Putha	Sooting 'Chutti'	
1976	Deviyange Theenduwa	Sunny	
1976	Kawuda Raja	Punchi Hamu	
1976	Harima Badu Thunak		
1977	Hariyanakota Ohoma Thamai		
1977	Deviyani Oba Koheda?	Anthony	
1977	Yakadaya	Bandara	
1977	Chandi Putha		
1977	Aege Adara Kathawa		
1978	Hitha Mithura		
1979	Visihathara Peya	Sira	
1980	Anuhasa		
1980	Hondin Inna		
1981	Kolamkarayo	Member Mahaththaya	
1982	Re Manamali	Sergeant Rubaru	
1982	Thakkita Tharikita		
1983	Yali Pipunu Malak		
1984	Bambara Patikki		
1984	Kekille Rajjuruwo	Kakkiley Rajjuruwo	
1987	Hitha Honda Chandiya	Muslim shopowner	
1988	Newa Gilunath Ban Chun	Mohandiram Wansanayake	
1989	Waradata Danduwam		
1991	Sihina Ahase Wasanthaya		
1992	Sakkara Suththara		
