= Kingsley Rajapakse =

Sri Lankan filmmaker and actor (1934–1983)

Kingsley Rajapakse කිංස්ලි රාජපක්ෂ
- Born: Kumarasinghe Rajapakse; April 9, 1934; Nuwara Eliya, Sri Lanka
- Died: June 13, 1983 (aged 49); Colombo, Sri Lanka
- Education: St. Sylvester's College
- Occupations: Actor, filmmaker
- Years active: 1955–1983

Kumarasinghe Rajapakse (9 April 1934 – 13 June 1983 කිංස්ලි රාජපක්ෂ), popularly known as Kingsley Rajapakse was a film director and actor in Sri Lankan cinema.

== Personal life ==
Kumarasinghe was born on 9 April 1934 in Udamadura village, Rikillagaskada, Walapane, Sri Lanka. His father, K. S. D. Rajapaksa was a teacher. His mother Weerasinghe Menike was a housewife. He was educated at St. Sylvester College, Kandy.

He had seven brothers including: Wijewardena, Wickramaratne, Premachandra and a sister named Indrani. Among these, Wijewardene Rajapaksa, was involved in cinema, produced the films Ran Kurullo and Rathu Makara directed by Kingsley. His brother Premachandra Rajapaksa, was a retired teacher. His son Dhammika Rajapaksa works as a lighting and assistant costume designer for films and teledramas at a Nugegoda Production Company.

He was married to his longtime partner, Iranganie Bulathsinhala. He had five children: eldest daughter Saman Rajapaksa who was married to Shantha Karunaratne, son of Prof. W. S. Karunaratne, former Ambassador of Sri Lanka to the United States of America and Indumathi Karunaratne. Other sons are Chandana and Mangala. Mangala died in 2018. Youngest daughter is Chandrika.

Kingsley was ill for several years and left the film industry. He died of a heart attack on 13 June 1983, at the age of 49.

== Career ==
He loved cinema from the time he was in school and was known as a student who was punished for sneaking out of the College dormitory and watching Hindi and English movies. In 1955, Kumarasinghe submitted an application for the film advertisement Perakadoru Bana published by Willy Jayamanne. Out of hundreds of applications, Kumarasinghe was able to play a minor role in the film.

However, he had a tough time with economy during this period. Then he produced a stage play named Daivaya along with one of his friends. Later in 1956, he was introduced to film director T.K. Somasekaran by his friend. At that time, Somasekaran was preparing to direct the film Saradam. In the film, Kumarasinghe was selected to write the dialogue and co-direct it as well as played a minor role. Meanwhile, Somasekaran insisted Kumarasinghe to change his name. Then he gave the name 'Kingsley' which is appropriate for the screen.

In 1958, he played an antagonist character in the film Suneetha directed by P. Neelakantan. During the set, he met Asoka Ponnamperuma who became a close friend. After the film Saradam, Kingsley co-directed the film Aviswasaya with Somasekaran which was released in 1958. At the same time, he played a supporting role in the film Sri 296 directed by Premanath Moraes. He then starred in Somasekaran's Pirimiyek Nisa in 1960. In 1963, he worked as an assistant director and played a supportive role in the film Wena Swargayak Kumatada?.

In the meantime, he worked in an advertising campaign in the commercial sector of Sri Lanka Broadcasting Corporation. In 1963, he made his directorial debut Deepashika with the guidance of Douglas Kothalawala. In the film, Kingsley also played a sub-lead role whereas Jeevarani Kurukulasuriya, Sandhya Kumari and Kithsiri Perera played lead roles. Although the film was extremely popular, it was an excerpt from the story of the Tamil film Anbu Engai. In 1965, he made the commercially successful film Handapana where the film received critical acclaim for its background music. For the music in the film, Sisira Senaratne won the award for the Best Music Direction at 1966 Sarasaviya Awards.

Kingsley later directed the films Hitata Hitha (1965), Singithi Surathal, Indunila (1968), Kalana Mithuro (1971), Suhada Pathuma, Sinavai Inavai, Sadhana (1973) and Sudu Pareviyo (1977). In 1979, he wrote the screenplay and directed his last film Raan Kurallo. With his 1971 film Kalana Mithuro, he introduced Tissa Wijesurendra into Sinhala cinema.

== Filmography ==
Year	Film	Roles	Ref.
1954	Saradam	Co–director	
1955	Perakadoru Bena		
1958	Deyyange Rate		
1958	Suneetha		
1958	Sepali		
1959	Avishwasaya	Dialogue Writer, Raja	
1959	Sri 296	Assistant Director, Norton	
1960	Pirimiyek Nisa	Assistant director, Dialogue Writer	
1963	Wena Swargayak Kumatada?	Co–director	
1963	Deepashika	Director, Actor: Lucky	
1965	Handapana	Director	
1965	Hithata Hitha	Director, screenwriter	
1968	Singithi Surathal	Director	
1968	Indunila	Director, screenwriter	
1971	Kalana Mithuro	Director, Art Director	
1973	Suhada Pethuma	Director	
1973	Sinawai Inawai	Director	
1976	Ganga	Composer	
1977	Sudu Paraviyo	Director, screenwriter, Film Editor	
1979	Raan Kurullo	Director, screenwriter, Film Editor	
