= Adata Vediya Heta Hondai =

1963 Sri Lankan film

Adata Wadiya Heta Hondai
- Directed by: M. Masthan
- Screenplay by: Hugo Fernando
- Produced by: K. Gunaratnam
- Starring: Gamini Fonseka; Jeevarani Kurukulasuriya; Ananda Jayaratne; Sandhya Kumari; Vijitha Mallika
- Music by: Karunaratne Abeysekera (lyrics); M. K. Rocksamy (direction); W. D. Amaradeva (composition)
- Release date: 26 March 1963 (Sri Lanka)
- Country: Sri Lanka
- Language: Sinhala

Adata Vediya Heta Hondai (Sinhala, Tomorrow Is Better Than Today) is a 1963 Sri Lankan film directed by Indian filmmaker M. Masthan and produced by producer K. Gunaratnam. The film starring Gamini Fonseka and Jeevarani Kurukulasuriya. It was a box office success in the country.

== Plot ==
- Gamini Fonseka as Gamini
- Jeevarani Kurukulasuriya as Sriyani
- Ananda Jayaratne as Ananda
- Sandhya Kumari as Sandhya
- Vijitha Mallika as Vijitha
- Nelson Karunagama as Doctor
- Ignatius Gunaratne
- Alfred Edirimanne as Alfred 'Thaththa'
- Thalatha Gunasekara
- Hugo Fernando as Gabriel 'Mudalali'
- Anthony C. Perera
- Christy Leonard Perera
- H. D. Kulatunga as Sandhya's Thaththa
- Herbert Amarawickrama
- Kalyani Perera

== Songs ==
- "Sandun Gase" – J. A. Milton Perera and Mallika Kahawita
- Sethsiri Sethsiri" – Latha and chorus
- "Soka Susum Marathe" – Latha Walpola
- "Baloli Loli" – Indrani Wijebandara
- "Baloli Loli" – Latha Walpola
- "Rasadun Netha Di" – Latha Walpola
- "Amma" – Latha Walpola and chorus
