= Christy Leonard Perera =

Sri Lankan actor and singer

Christy Leonard Perera ක්‍රිස්ටි ලෙනාඩ් පෙරේරා
- Born: Madurawela Arachchilage Christy Leonard Perera; 27 July 1932; Colombo, Sri Lanka
- Died: 23 December 2015 (aged 83); Maligawatte, Colombo
- Occupations: Actor, singer
- Years active: 1949–1982
- Spouse: Mary Loretta Rachal Perera (m. 1982)
- Awards: Kalabushana

Kala Keerthi Madurawela Arachchilage Christy Leonard Perera (born 27 July 1932 – died 23 December 2015 as ක්‍රිස්ටි ලෙනාඩ් පෙරේරා) [Sinhala]), popularly known as Christy Leonard Perera, was an actor in Sri Lankan cinema as well as a musician and comedian.

== Personal life ==
Perera was born on 27 July 1932 in Colombo. He completed education from St. Lucia's College Colombo 13 . His father worked as a port checker. He has two sisters. After the sudden death of his father, his mother worked as a midwife at Suleiman Hospital. In the meantime, his older sister died suddenly. The other sister also died with that sadness.

He was married to Mary Loretta Rachal Perera, a trained teacher. Perera married Rachel at St. Lucia Cathedral in Kotahena on 7 August 1982 at the age of 43. At that time, Perera was working at the Polythene Factory in Kotahena.

He was a devoted Roman Catholic and regularly attached with St. Lucias Catherdral, Kotahena. He died on 23 December 2015 at the age of 83. His remains were brought to his residence at Maligawatte housing scheme. His final rites were held on 26 December 2015 at Borella Cemetery.

== Cinema career ==
In 1946 he participated in an amateur program at Radio Ceylon coordinated by Thevis Guruge. He imitated comedian Eddie Jayamanne and won the contest. In 1948, Perera joined as a comedian in Radio Ceylon. He learned music under renowned composer B. S. Perera. Then he worked as a musician and playback singer. His first song was Kullen Pola Pola. Some of his popular songs are Mama Badapissa, Amma Kiyana Kiyatha Haki andAduru Walawe Punsada, recorded for His Master's Voice. He sang the duet Hitha Yana Atha Yannata Heka with Gamini Fonseka and then sang the song Tikiri Lande Ali Nawathina Colomba Nagare with H. R. Jothipala. His song Sakala Sirin Piri Siri Lankawe was an integral part of music shows back then.

His classmate Prem Jayanth was the main actor in the film Sujatha. With the guidance from Jayanth and fellow actor Dommie Jayawardena, Perera entered cinema. He started cinema career in 1954 with the film Warada Kageda directed by T.R. Sundaram. The film was released at Gamini theatre, Colombo and became highly popular. Then he acted in the film Adata Vediya Heta Hondai produced at Hendala Wijeya studio, Sri Lanka's first production house. He continuously established as a prominent comedian of early 1960s and played popular roles in the films Chandiya, Sukumali, Suneetha, Sundara Birinda, Allapu Gedara and Hondama Welawa. His only television acting came through Athma Pooja directed by Ajith Perera. But the teledrama was not aired.

His last film was Onna Mame Kella Panapi, which premiered on September 3, 1976. He quit from acting after the death of his mother in 1979. The song Amma Kiya Kiyatha Haki Ekama Landakatai was written by Karunaratne Abeysekera for Perera's mother. In 1994, he directed the film Aragalaya.

On 17 August 2002 Perera was honored with a festive ceremony.

== Filmography ==
Year	Film	Role	Ref.
1954	Warada Kageda	Gobo	
1954	Radala Piliruwa	Thomas	
1954	Duppathage Duka		
1956	Suraya		
1957	Sukumali	Nikama	
1957	Salli Malli Salli		
1958	Suneetha		
1958	Sepali		
1958	Sirimali	Penda	
1960	Sundara Birinda		
1960	Veera Vijaya		
1963	Adata Vediya Heta Hondai		
1963	Udarata Manike		
1964	Dheewarayo		
1964	Sithaka Mahima		
1965	Chandiya	Kavi Kola Karaya	
1965	Yata Giya Dawasa		
1965	Allapu Gedara	Musician	
1966	Maha Ra Hamuwu Sthriya		
1967	Okkoma Hari		
1967	Sura Chauraya		
1968	Wanasara		
1968	Ataweni Pudumaya		
1969	Oba Nathinam		
1969	Kohomada Wade		
1970	Athma Puja		
1970	Penawa Neda		
1971	Kalana Mithuro		
1973	Hondama Welawa		
1974	Duppathage Hithawatha	Ananda's friend	
1976	Onna Mame Kella Panapi		
