= Edirimanne =

Edirimanne is a surname. Notable people with the surname include:

- Alfred Edirimanne (1929–2000), Sri Lankan actor
- Chinthaka Edirimanne (born 1968), Sri Lankan cricketer
