= M. V. Balan =

Sri Lankan actor and comedian

M. V. Balan එම්. වී. බාලන්
- Born: Mahadevan Vellupillai Balakrishnan; 3 March 1941; Yatiyanthota, Sri Lanka
- Died: 14 January 2017 (aged 75); Ratmalana, Colombo
- Occupations: Actor, filmmaker, producer
- Years active: 1958–2005

Mahadevan Vellupillai Balakrishnan (born 3 March 1941 – died 14 January 2017 as එම්. වී. බාලන්) [Sinhala]), popularly known as M. V. Balan, was an actor in Sri Lankan cinema. Career spanned for more than four decades, Balan has worked as a film production manager, assistant director, choreographer and a filmmaker.

== Personal life ==
Balan was born on 3 March 1941 (Sarasaviya recorded the birth date as 15 March 1940) in Ganepalla village, Yatiyanthota. Balan was married to a Sinhala woman Chandrawathi Hesarasinghe and the couple has two children.

He died on 14 January 2017 at the age of 75. His remains are kept at the 8th floor of the Mount Lavinia housing scheme, Kalmdemulla Road, Golumudama Junction, Ratmalana until 3.00 pm. The funeral took place on 16 January 2017 at 4.00 pm at the Mount Lavinia General Cemetery.

== Career ==
He joined Ceylon Studios as a technician in 1958 and was first involved as a lighting artist in the film Sihanaya.

He made his acting debut in 1958 film Wanaliya with a minor role. Then he appeared in many dramatic and comedy roles including Wanaliya, Pirimiyek Nisa, Suvineetha Lalani, Ganthera, Sasaraka Hati and Cheriyo Captain. Balan worked as the choreographer in many popular films such as Sithaka Mahima, Ipadune Ai, London Hamu and Okkoma Hari. His acting in the film Nomiyena Minisun with Gamini Fonseka was a memorable feat in his career. His role as a servant was highly appreciated by critics.

He has directed 11 films in Sinhala cinema started with Oba Nathinam in 1969. In 1975, Balan directed the film Hitha Honda Minihek starred by Gamini Fonseka. In 1978, he was the producer of film Mage Ran Putha. He also directed popular films Rahasak Nathi Rahasak and Deviyani Sathya Surakinna. Apart from Sinhala films, Balan also directed several Sri Lankan Tamil films such as Manjal Kunkumam and Nirmala.

== Filmography ==
=== As actor ===
Year	Film	Role	Ref.
1958	Wanaliya		
1959	Avishwasaya		
1959	Sri 296		
1959	Sihinaya	Alokarana	
1960	Kawata Andare		
1960	Pirimiyek Nisa		
1961	Suvineetha Lalani		
1961	Gan Thera		
1962	Sansare		
1962	Suhada Divi Piduma		
1963	Wena Swargayak Kumatada?		
1963	Suhada Sohoyuro		
1963	Deepashika	Peter	
1964	Kala Kala De Pala Pala De		
1964	Dheewarayo		
1964	Suba Sarana Sepa Sithe		
1964	Samiya Birindage Deviyaya		
1964	Sasaraka Hati		
1965	Handapaana		
1965	Yata Giya Dawasa		
1965	Hathara Maha Nidhanaya	Broken window homeowner	
1965	Adarayay Karunawai		
1965	Hithata Hitha		
1965	Allapu Gedara	Tabla player	
1965	Satha Panaha		
1965	Sweep Ticket		
1966	Athulweema Thahanam		
1966	Kinkini Paada		
1966	Sampatha		
1966	Sudu Duwa		
1966	Oba Dutu Da		
1967	Ipadune Ai?		
1967	Okkoma Hari		
1967	Sura Chauraya		
1968	London Hamu		
1968	Mathru Bhoomi		
1968	Amathikama		
1968	Ataweni Pudumaya		
1969	Oba Nathinam		
1970	Penawa Neda		
1971	Kalana Mithuro		
1973	Suhada Pathuma		
1973	Sinawai Inawai		
1974	Hadawath Naththo		
1978	Deepanjali		
1988	Gedara Budun Amma	Minister Lingam	
1988	Angulimala		
1989	Mamai Raja	River jump stopper	
1989	Obata Rahasak Kiyannam		
1989	Shakthiya Obai Amme	Sergeant Sinnathambi	
1990	Jaya Shakthi		
1990	Yukthiyata Wada	Guarding henchman	
1990	Hondin Nathinam Narakin		
1991	Raja Kello		
1991	Cheriyo Doctor	Security guard	
1993	Surayan Athara Veeraya	Hubcap robbery victim	
1993	Come O'Go Chicago	Near hit street walker	
1994	Nomiyena Minisun		
1994	Nohadan Kumariyo		
1995	Cheriyo Captain	Pabul	
1998	Aeya Obata Barai	Sergeant Balan	
2002	Somy Boys	Factory manager	
2005	Sanduni		

=== As director ===
Year	Film	Ref.
1969	Oba Nathinam	
1969	Manjal Kunkumam	
1975	Hitha Honda Minihek	
1978	Mage Ran Putha	
1982	Rahasak Nathi Rahasak	
1995	Deviyani Sathya Suriyakinna	
1996	Hitha Honda Gahaniyak	
