= K. Gunaratnam =

Indian–Sri Lankan film producer (1917–1989)

- கே. குணரத்தினம் කනකසබේ ගුණරත්නම්
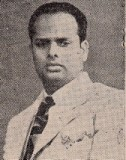
- K. Gunaratnam in 1950s
- Born: Kanagasabai Gunaratnam; July 30, 1917; Jaffna, British Ceylon
- Died: August 9, 1989 (aged 72); Colombo, Sri Lanka
- Other names: KG
- Education: Jaffna Central College
- Occupations: Film producer, businessman, industrialist
- Years active: 1934–1989
- Spouses: Padma Selvadurai; Kamala Selvadurai
- Children: 6
- Awards: Inaugural Yugha Abhimani, 2023

Kanagasabai Gunaratnam (20 July 1917 – 9 August 1989; Tamil: கனகசபை குணரத்தினம்; Sinhala: කනකසබේ ගුණරත්නම්), popularly known as K. Gunaratnam was a prolific film producer in Sri Lankan cinema. Started his film producing career during post-independent Ceylon, Gunaratnam is the pioneer to establish two Sinhala film studios: 'Cinemas Limited' and 'Vijaya Studios', where he produced more than 20 blockbuster and commercial movies.

== Personal life ==
He was born on 20 July 1917 in Athiyadi, Jaffna as the youngest son of the family. His father Manikkam Kanakasabey was a merchant in Jaffna. His mother Manikkam Murugesu was a housewife. He studied at Jaffna Central College up to junior class.

In 1941 he married Padma Selvadurai, however her untimely death led to him marrying her sister, Kamala Selvadurai. Apart from cinema, he was also a planter. Horseback riding and tennis were his main hobbies and he was an active member of the Tamil Union Sports Club and the Orient Club. The couple had two sons and four daughters.

== Career ==
Gunaratnam came to Colombo hoping to get a job as a representative of a film distribution company in Sri Lanka. In 1934, he worked for two years as an agent for a film distribution company called Windsor Talkies. When the company was bought by Chittampalam Abraham Gardiner and ruled under a new administration called Ceylon Theatres, he worked for about three months before retiring in 1941 and buying the soft drink business at No. 117, New Chetty Street, Colombo where his ice cream business was known as Nelwani & Co. Then he joined the film industry as a partner in a film distribution company called Wallington Talkies. In 1948, he became its chairman and built the Wellington Cinema in Jaffna. Then in 1950, he established the cinema company called Cinemas Limited and started building cinemas and producing films.

The first production of Cinemas Limited was 1953 film Sujatha directed by T. Somasekeran, which made a new era in Sinhala cinema industry. Even though the story of the film was chosen by imitating the then popular Hindi film Bari Behen, several new faces were introduced into Sinhala Cinema, who later became pillars in Sinhala cinema, including: Prem Jayanth, Florida Jayalath, Dommie Jayawardena, Shanthi Lekha and David Dharmakeerthi. The film also made the first trailer and a full-fledged promotional plan of a Sinhala film. Gunaratnam introduced the first patriotic song Manaranjana Darshaniya Lanka to the film and included several Sri Lankan scenes such as Anuradhapura, Polonnaruwa, Sigiriya and Katharagama in the film which was produced entirely at the Modern Studio in India.

In 1965, Gunaratnam was instrumental in inviting famous Indian actor M G Ramachandran (MGR) to visit Sri Lanka.

After the box office records in his first film, Gunaratnam produced his second film Warada Kageda in 1954. The film introduced Karunaratne Abeysekera as a lyricist, T. B. Ilangaratne as a dialogue writer and Christy Leonard Perera as an actor. Meanwhile, Gunaratnam sponsored the publication of Ilangaratne's first novel, "Vilambitha", at the request of his friend Nadesan. After that in the same year, he agreed to produce the novel "Radala Piliruwa" by W. A. Silva into a film after Ilangaratne's proposal. Eventually, he was associated with the companies as Chairman of K.G. Group of Companies, Fuji Graphics Ceylon Ltd. And Photo Kina Ltd. Apart from that, he was the Managing Director of Cine Sounds Sales and Services Ltd., Union Carbide Ceylon Ltd., Asbestos Cement Industries Ltd., Alhambra Hotels Ltd. And United Spinning and Weaving Mills.

As an industrialist, he manufactured ballpoint pens, corrugated cartons and plastic containers. He also developed state-of-the-art yarn spinning and weaving mills at Ja-Ela with 24,000 Swiss Reiter spindles which was being expanded into weaving with 200 Picanol water jet looms with 100 looms having been imported in June 1983. They were temporarily stored at the Hendala industrial complex until the foreign engineers were to install them at the weaving mills in Ja-Ela in August 1983.

Determined to promote his films as well as other Sinhala films, Gunaratnam released the magazine 'Kala' on 20 August 1955. In 1956, he produced the film Dosthara. Before screening the film, Cinemas Limited released the book 'Mage Jeevitha Viththi' written by Rukmani Devi who acted in the film. This is the first book written by a Sinhala actress. In 1956, Gunaratnam won the award for the second most popular film in the 1956 'Dinamina' newspaper 'Rangamadala' film competition with 11,243 votes. In the following years, he produced many commercially successful films such as Duppathage Duka (1956), Suraya (1857), Vana Mohini (1958).

In 1960 he joined with Lester James Peries and produced his film Sandesaya. He made the Portuguese fort, which was 20 feet in circumference and 80 feet in circumference in Belihul Oya with a cost about LKR 38,000 in 1959 out of black stone. It is said that Cinemas has spent around Rs. 500,000 for this film. The film became a hallmark in the film industry, where 132 copies have been printed from one negative film. All the songs became popular and the song 'Pruthugeesi Karaya' became popular and thousands of CDs containing the songs were sold. Meanwhile, it has been screened in 136 cinemas island-wide and it is reported that the dialogues were screened in Czech in Czechoslovakia. Gunaratnam also took steps to credit the proceeds of the premiere to the Deaf and Dumb Fund in Ratmalana.

In 196, he established Vijaya Studio, Hendala. The original name of this studio was 'Seeni Studio' which was started by purchasing an 8-acre land in Hendala at a cost of LKR 800,000. Gunaratnam's full-fledged printing press on Armor Street, Colombo was the 'Seeni Press' where he printed color film posters and 'Kala' magazine. The first film to be shot at the Vijaya studio, was Adata Vediya Heta Hondai directed by M. Masthan. The first song recorded in its studio was 'Oya Belma Oya Kelma' sung by Dharmadasa Walpola and Latha Walpola for the film Kurulu Bedda. In 1963, he produced the film Chandiya where all the street scenes and clubs built at the Vijaya studio.

Gunaratnam was responsible for half of its production of the first color full-length Sinhalese language film Ranmuthu Duwa directed by Mike Wilson. Then he involved with many blockbuster films such as Dheewarayo (1964), Sura Chowraya (1967), Ataveni Pudumaya (1968), Lakseta Kodiya (1970), Athma Puja (1970) and Hodai Narakai (1973). In 1965, he won the award for the Best Producer at 2nd United Lanka Fans Society Award Ceremony.

During the Black July ethnic riots of 1983 in Colombo, Gunaratnam suffered with many problems. He traumatically fled from his residence in the middle of the night on 22 July 1983, to escape from marauding mobs. He later sought refuge at the then Holiday Inn Hotel in the city of Colombo. Meanwhile, some of his film studios together with the collection of Sinhala films were totally destroyed during the riots.

== Death ==
He was assassinated on 9 August 1989 at the age of 72 during the 1987–1989 JVP insurrection by a gunshot. At the time of death, he was going from his office to his residence for lunch. Whilst coming out of his office, in the front seat of his car, at a point of turning, two gunmen on a motorcycle had shot him at very close range.

=== Aftermath ===
In 2019, his son G. R. Pathmaraj filed a lawsuit due to plaintiff claims that the late Gunaratnam's exclusive economic and moral rights were protected during his lifetime and are also protected for 70 years from his death. The Commercial High Court later extended its Enjoining Order restraining telecasting, exhibiting, displaying or showing the Sinhala film Sujatha.

== Filmography ==
Year	Film	Roles	Ref.
1953	Sujatha	Producer	
1954	Warada Kageda	Producer	
1954	Radala Piliruwa	Producer	
1956	Dosthara	Producer	
1956	Duppathage Duka	Producer	
1957	Suraya	Producer	
1958	Vana Mohini	Producer	
1960	Sandesaya	Producer	
1960	Veera Vijaya	Producer	
1963	Adata Vediya Heta Hondai	Producer	
1964	Udarata Menike	Producer	
1965	Allapu Gedara	Producer	
1965	Dheewarayo	Producer	
1965	Chandiya	Producer	
1966	Oba Dutu Da	Producer	
1967	Sura Chowraya	Producer	
1968	Ataweni Pudumaya	Producer	
1970	Lakseta Kodiya	Producer	
1970	Aathma Pooja	Producer	
1973	Hondai Narakai	Producer	
1978	Apsara	Producer	

== Dubbed films ==
- Pathiwatha 1957
- Vira Putha 1959
- Zimbo 1961
- Angulimala 1963
