= Jeevarani Kurukulasuriya =

Sri Lankan actress

Jeevarani Kurukulasuriya ජීවරාණි කුරුකුලසූරිය
- Born: 2 December 1941 (age 84); Aluthgama, Sri Lanka
- Education: Good Shepherd Convent, Colombo; Good Shepherd Convent, Kotahena
- Occupation: Actress
- Years active: 1959–1968
- Spouse: Lanka Wijeratne (m. 1968)
- Children: 3
- Father: Kurukulasuriyage Venus Anthony Fernando
- Relatives: Shirani Kurukulasuriya; Janaki Kurukulasuriya; Menik Kurukulasuriya

Jeevarani Kurukulasuriya (born 2 December 1941 as ජීවරාණි කුරුකුලසූරිය) [Sinhala]), is an actress in Sri Lankan cinema, theater and television. One of the most popular actresses in early Sinhala cinema, she played the main role in Sri Lanka's first Sinhala color film Ranmuthu Duwa.

== Personal life ==
Jeevarani was born on 2 December 1941 in Aluthgama, Kalutara as the eldest of the family. Her father was Kurukulasuriyage Venus Anthony Fernando. When three years old, Jeevarani used to dance, sing lullabies, poems and do various mimics in front of parents and relatives. She completed education from Good Shepherd Convent, Colombo and Good Shepherd Convent, Kotahena.

She has three younger sisters - Shirani, Janaki and Menik, all are actresses. She also has one brother, Vivek, who currently lives in Australia. Shirani got the opportunity to act with Jeevarani in the film Ranmuthu Duwa. Janaki got the opportunity to play with sister in the film Sasaraka Hati. Youngest sister, Menik is a popular actress who acted in many commercial films including, Ahas Gawwa, Biththi Hathara and Nommara 17.

Jeevarani is married to Lanka Wijeratne, who is a doctor. They married in 1968. They moved to Australia after spending five years of marriage in Sri Lanka. The couple has three daughters - Sajeewani, Senani and Lankangani. Elder daughter, Sanjeewani is a nutritionist and a first-class singer. Younger daughters are doctors. Lankangani is married to entrepreneur Nalaka Edirisinghe. Nalaka is the son of media personality Soma Edirisinghe. Senani is also a singer and released her first solo track in 2016.

== Career ==
At very small stage, her father took her to Radio Ceylon. Then she became a "Lama Mandapaya" singer. Under the guidance of Thilakasiri Fernando, Jeevarani became an “A” grade artist. Along with Fernando, she sang the popular songs Maala Manamaaliya Wu Daa and Naaga Lowin Gena A Bulath. During this period, she met Vajira Chitrasena and started to learn Kandyan dancing. She also learned dance from R.W. Sirineris Gurunnanse and Nalini Samarasinghe. In the meantime, she also joined the Panadura Arts Association.

With the intentions to be an actress as her idol Rukmani Devi, Jeevarani started drama career in 1959 with the stage play Maha Hene Riri Yaka, a story written by prime minister S. W. R. D. Bandaranaike and produced by Dick Dias. The play became very popular and staged 40 times. Then, her father took Jeevarani to Dr. Lester James Peries. Peries offered a role in his blockbuster movie Sandesaya, which marked her maiden appearance in Sinhala cinema. Then she acted in the film Veera Vijaya and went to India with her grandmother for the shooting. Her major breakthrough in film came with Sri Lanka's first color film Ran Muthu Doowa directed by Mike Wilson with the role "Kumari". In the film, she acted opposite to Gamini Fonseka and quickly made a unique cinema couple.

Jeevarani along with Sandhya Kumari and Vijitha Mallika were the most popular actresses in 1960s. Some of her popular films include Bicycle Hora, Adata Wediya Heta Hondai, Okkoma Hari, Horungeth Horu. In the film Senasuma Kothanda, she played as a nurse, whereas in the film Senehasa, she played a role of poor mother. Although a singer, Jeevarani got her only playback singing in the movie Hatha Kendare. Another memorable moment in her film career came through Senasili Suwaya directed by Robin Tampoe. In the film, she had a difficult time trying to escape the train and commit suicide, which she acted excellently.

After the marriage, she quit acting and moved to Australia. After 28 years, she appeared in the 2006 film Hiripoda Wassa.

== Filmography ==
Year	Film	Role	Ref.
1960	Sandesaya	Executed man's daughter	
1960	Veera Vijaya		
1962	Ranmuthu Duwa	Kumari	
1963	Adata Vediya Heta Hondai	Sriyani	
1963	Udarata Manike		
1963	Deepashika	Deepa	
1964	Kala Kala De Pala Pala De		
1964	Sasaraka Hati	Shanthi	
1964	Sujage Rahasa		
1965	Yata Giya Dawasa		
1965	Saaravita	Imara Ganegoda	
1966	Senasuma Kothanada	Nurse	
1966	Delovak Athara	Shiranee Gunasekara	
1966	Kapatikama	Manel Fernando	
1966	Oba Dutu Da		
1966	Senasili Suwaya	Nayana 'Kumari'	
1967	Hathara Kendare		
1967	Sorungeth Soru		
1967	Ipadune Ai		
1967	Okkoma Hari	Susila	
1968	Singithi Surathal		
1968	Bicycle Hora		
1968	Indunila		
1969	Senehasa	Mother	
1969	Baduth Ekka Horu	Dancer	
1970	Sumudu Bharya		
1973	Gopalu Handa		
1974	Sheela	Sheela Samaratunga 'Mala'	
1978	Seetha Devi		
2006	Hiripoda Wassa	Pooja's mother	
