= Robin Tampoe =

Sri Lankan film director (1930-2000)

Robin Tampoe රොබින් තම්පෝ
- Born: Rabindra Coomaraswamy; 29 December 1930; Jaffna, Sri Lanka
- Died: 22 March 2000 (aged 69)
- Education: Jaffna Central College
- Alma mater: Madras Christian College; Sri Lanka Law College
- Occupations: Actor; composer
- Spouse: Rita Carmelyn Fernando (m. 1960)
- Children: 6
- Father: William McGowan Sellasamy

Rabindra Coomaraswamy (29 December 1930 – 22 March 2000), popularly known by his stage name Robin Tampoe, was a film maker of Sri Lankan cinema. One of the earliest pillars in Sinhala cinema, Tampoe hailed from the Sri Lankan Tamil community but most of his movies were made in the Sinhala language. He was the son of another pioneering filmmaker, W.M.S Tampoe.

== Personal life ==
Tampoe was born on 29 December 1930 in Jaffna to a family of lawyers. The baby was named Rabindra in memory of renowned Indian dramatist Rabindranath Tagore's visit to Ceylon. His great-grandfather Tamodan Pillai McQueen Tampoe was a retired magistrate and judge. Robin's grandfather Gurusami Thananiel Hunt Tampoe was a lawyer in the District Court. Robin's father William McGowan Sellasamy was a lawyer, film producer and a director. William was known in Sinhala cinema as the W.M.S Tampoe or 'Pappa Tampoe'.

Robin was first educated at Jaffna Central College, Jaffna. Then he went to India and studied at the Madras Christian College. Upon his return, he attended the Sri Lanka Law College.

In 1960 he married an ethnic Sinhalese, Rita Carmelyn Fernando, from Ja-Ela whom he had met during his law college days. They had six children, born between 1961 and 1969: four daughters, Vilasnee, Thiranee, Dulanee, and Yuanee and two sons Sanjeeva and Robin. Their eldest daughter Vilasnee Tampoe-Hautin is Full Professor at the University of La Réunion. Vilasnee Tampoe authored the biography of Robin Tampoe in 2008: Sanjeeva manages his father's business in the name of R.T film studios in Colombo Sri Lanka having its offices in Chennai India and Kuala Lumpur Malaysia. He is also involved in importing foreign language films for television, dubbing television programs and children's movies for Sri Lankan television stations, with his own recording and dubbing studios. He is also a registered sound engineer under the National Film Corporation of Sri Lanka. Rita died on 16 July 2018, whereas Robin Tampoe died on 22 March 2000, at the age of 69.

== Cinema career ==
Robin started his film career at the age of 25 years under the guidance of his father W.M.S Tampoe. He generated his own interest in cinema after observing his father who directed the early Sinhala films including Sepali, Samiya Birindage Deviyaya, Landaka Mahima, and Waradata Danduwam. In India, his father was known as 'Ceylon Thambi' where he produced six Tamil films in India in 1942. He also engaged in an import-export film trade with South Indian film distributors, notably the renowned director and studio owner T. R. Sundaram of Modern Studios, Salem (near Madras). In 1958, he joined his father in Madras and co- directed and produced Sepali which was shot entirely in India.

Meanwhile, William and Robin laid the foundation in regional film cooperation between Ceylon and India. Under the supervision of Tampoe, Sinhala films were shot and produced in Gemini and Golden Studios, Madras. The 1960s, he visited a number of North Indian studios, including the Bombay Talkies to produce Sinhala films. Before becoming a producer, Robin used the existing companies in Ceylon to distribute his films beginning with K. Gunaratnam, who had entered the film industry as W. M. S. Tampoe's assistant. His early films were also produced by C .A. Gardiner's Ceylon Theatres with the Indian technical crew. In 1961, he directed the film Suvineetha Lalani which, recorded 14 songs. At the first Sarasaviya Film Festival held in 1964, the film came in fifth with 24,712 votes. In the film, he introduced the actress Shyama Anandan to cinema with the film Suvineetha Lalani who acted as a three-month-old baby as well as Wijeratne Warakagoda was introduced as a lawyer. Piyadasa Wijekoon, who had played minor roles in two previous films, became a stuntman through the film.

Between 1956 and 1974, his films were shot exclusively in the Sinhala language. When the 1961 ban was imposed on Ceylonese directors, prohibiting the shooting of Sinhala films in South India, he began making films in Sri Lankan soil. During this period, he used only ethnic Sinhala crew and refrain from dubbing and sub-titling Sinhala films into foreign languages. Then, he travelled to Japan NHK through Hong Kong and Singapore in 1963, to purchase cameras, projectors and other equipment. After return to Sri Lanka, he constructed R. T. Studios, at Wellampitiya which was completed in 1964 becoming fourth shooting site in Sri Lanka (the other were: Ceylon Studios, Vijaya Studios and Navajeevana). In the adjacent area, he built a cinema which he named after his daughter, Vilasnee.

His studio became a training ground for several local actors, actresses, music directors, cameramen and technical assistants. In 1963, he directed the film Sudu Sande Kalu Vala where it became the first film to feature five musicians: Premasiri Khemadasa, M. K. Rocksamy, Alfred Perera, Latif, Mohamed Sally and Stanley de Alwis. In 1964, he released the blockbuster film Sudo Sudu which made the entry of renowned music director, Somadasa Elvitigala. Robin also introduced the cameraman Timothy Weeraratne and renowned actresses Suvineetha Weerasinghe and Nita Fernando to Sinhala cinema. Popular singer H. R. Jothipala acted as a charismatic actor in the film for the first time. He later contributed to the organization of the first festival of Sinhala films at the Shanthi cinema in Jaffna.

== Directed filmography ==
Year	Film	Ref.
1958	Sepali	Sitarist
1959	Sirimalee	Sitarist
1961	Suvineetha Lalani	Sitarist
1962	Suhada Divi Piduma	Sitarist
1963	Sudu Sande Kalu Wala	Sitarist
1964	Sulalitha Sobani	Sitarist
1964	Samaje Api Okkoma Samanai	Sitarist
1965	Sudo Sudu	Sitarist
1966	Sangevena Sevanelle	Sitarist
1966	Mahadena Muththa	Sitarist
1966	Sanasili Suvaya	Sitarist
1968	Dehakaha Dukha	Sitarist
1969	Pick Pocket	Sitarist
1972	Ada Mehemai	Sitarist
1974	Surekha	Sitarist
