= Shanthi Lekha =

Sri Lankan actress

- Born: Rita Irene Koys; July 1, 1929; Kalutara Sri Lanka
- Died: May 11, 2009 (aged 79); Monte Carlo Monaco
- Known for: Film Actress
- Spouse: Shanthi Viraj

Rita Irene Koys (July 1, 1929 – May 11, 2009), better known as Shanthi Lekha, was a Sri Lankan Film actress. She played the role of mother in more films than any other actress in Sinhala cinema.

== Personal life ==
Lekha was born in Kalutara on July 1, 1929. She received her stage name from her first husband Shanthi Viraj. They had first met while she was attending Holy Family Convent in Kalutara.

She died in France May 11, 2009.

== Career ==
She starred in composer D. T. Fernando's play Shantha Prabha (1942). She subsequently made a mark as a dancer in plays starring Dommie Jayawardena and Nona Subeda.

With Jayawardena, Lekha had her first film role in Sujatha (1953). Wearing a bathing suit, she danced along with Jayawardena to the song "Pem Rella Nagi." The role came with a payment of Rs. 500 and a contract prohibiting her from doing films for other production companies. The producer K. Gunaratnam would subsequently offer her roles in Warada Kageda, Radala Piliruwa and Dosthara.

Lekha first played a mother in Sandesaya (1960). She would play this role in over 350 films.

Lekha won Best Supporting Actress Awards at the Sarasaviya Film Festival for Gamini Fonseka's Parasathu Mal (1968) and Mudalinayaka Somaratne's Binaramali (1969). She also won Presidential Awards for Mayurige Kathawa and Ridi Nimnaya.

== Filmography ==
Year	Film	Role	Ref.
1953	Sujatha	Prema	
1954	Warada Kageda	Rupa	
1954	Radala Piliruwa	Laviniya	
1956	Dosthara	Rita	
1957	Jeewitha Satana		
1958	Salli Malli Salli		
1960	Sandesaya	Executed man's wife	
1963	Gamperaliya	Hamine	
1964	Suba Sarana Sepa Sithe		
1965	Sepatha Soya	Accomplice Rathna	
1965	Allapu Gedara	Sepalika's mother	
1966	Seethala Wathura		
1966	Delovak Athara	Accident victim's mother	
1966	Parasathu Mal	Kamala's mother	
1966	Oba Dutu Da		
1966	Senasili Suwaya	Wimal's mother	
1967	Ran Salu	Sarojini's mother	
1967	Saru Bima		
1967	Vasanthi		
1967	Ipadune Ai		
1967	Rena Giraw	Dissa's mother	
1967	Sura Chauraya		
1968	Pini Bindu		
1968	Dehadaka Duka	Gamini's mother	
1968	Ataweni Pudumaya		
1969	Narilatha	Jean	
1969	Kawuda Hari	Rita's mother	
1969	Binaramalee	Kiri Amma	
1969	Uthum Sthriya		
1970	Athma Pooja		
1970	Thevetha		
1970	Penawa Neda		
1970	Akkara Paha	Sena's mother	
1970	Tun Man Handiya	Sirisena's mother	
1971	Poojithayo	Mrs. Batuwantalawa	
1971	Devena Pipasa		
1971	Seeye Nottuwa		
1971	Samanala Kumariyo		
1971	Sahanaya		
1972	Nidhanaya	Irene's mother	
1972	Edath Suraya Adath Suraya	Alice	
1972	Hithaka Pipunu Mal		
1973	Aparadaya Saha Danduwama		
1973	Thushara	Sampath's mother	
1973	Hondama Welawa		
1973	Hondata Hondai	Violet	
1974	Ahas Gauwa	Vijay's mother	
1974	Hadawath Naththo		
1974	Onna Babo Billo Enawa		
1974	Senakeliya		
1974	Duppathage Hithawatha	Kanthi	
1974	Lasanda	Samadara	
1975	Hitha Honda Minihek	Jothi's mother	
1975	Obai Mamai	Suminda's mother	
1975	Kohoma Kiyannada	Sheela's mother	
1975	Amaraneeya Adare		
1975	Lassana Kella		
1975	Kokilayo		
1975	Sikuruliya	Namali's mother	
1975	Lassana Dawasak	Priyanthi's mother	
1975	Sangeetha	Sangeetha's mother	
1976	Nayana		
1976	Kawuda Raja	Manu's mother	
1976	Ganga		
1976	Madol Duwa	Annie Perera	
1976	Walmathwuwo	Cyril's mother	
1976	Kolamba Sanniya	Andare's sister	
1976	Asha		
1976	Hariyata Hari	Agnes	
1976	Onna Mame Kella Penapi		
1976	Saradielge Putha	Upasaka Amma	
1976	Adarei Man Adarei		
1976	Ran Thilaka		
1977	Neela		
1977	Sakunthala		
1977	Sudu Paraviyo	Kumari's mother	
1977	Hithuwoth Hithuwamai	Sumali's mother	
1977	Pembara Madhu		
1977	Deviyani Oba Kohida	Aginda	
1977	Chin Chin Nona		
1977	Siripala Saha Ranmenika		
1977	Rahas Kumanthranaya		
1977	Chandi Putha	Shanthi	
1977	Yakdaya	Somey's mother	
1977	Eya Dan Loku Minihek	Susila's mother	
1977	Aege Adara Kathawa	Ruvini's mother	
1978	Vishmaya	Janaka's mother	
1978	Hitha Mithura	Celestina	
1978	Sithaka Suwanda	Rita Samson	
1978	Mage Ran Putha		
1978	Tikira	Daisy Samarasekara	
1978	Sally		
1978	Sasara		
1978	Ahasin Polawata		
1979	Sarungale	Susheela's mother	
1979	Amal Biso		
1979	Ran Kurullo	Rajesh's mother	
1979	Sawudan Jema		
1979	Visihathara Peya	Sumana's mother	
1980	Uthumaneni	Mother	
1980	Ektam Ge	Rosalin	
1980	Doctor Susantha		
1980	Parithyagaya	Seelawathie	
1980	Sasaraka Pethum	Jagath's mother	
1980	Ganga Addara	Mrs. Bunna	
1980	Raja Dawasak		
1980	Sankhapali	Sanka's mother	
1980	Api Dedena		
1980	Miyurige Kathawa		
1981	Thavalama	Angatakka	
1981	Ranga	Vajira's mother	
1981	Sayuru Thera	Kathrina	
1981	Vajira	Nima's mother	
1981	Sagarayak Meda	Nurse Seneviratne	
1981	Bandura Mal		
1982	Re Manamali	Landlord	
1982	Sakvithi Suwaya	Ado 'Akka'	
1982	Sudu Ayya	Ananda's aunt	
1982	Ridee Nimnaya	Millie 'Nona'	
1982	Pradeepa		
1982	Sithara		
1982	Thakkita Tharikita		
1982	Chathu Madhura	Somawathie	
1983	Yali Pipunu Malak		
1983	Siwu Ranga Sena		
1983	Chutte	Kadajumma	
1983	Athin Athata	Nelum's mother	
1983	Thunhiri Mal		
1983	Pasamithuro	Gemunu's mother	
1984	Mala Giravi	Party well-wisher	
1984	Kokila	W. J. Nona	
1984	Sasara Chethana		
1984	Rana Derana		
1984	Hithawathiya	Mrs. Weerasinghe	
1985	Puthuni Mata Samawenna		
1985	Du Daruwo		
1986	Yali Hamuwennai	Prasanna's mother	
1986	Devduwa		
1986	Pooja		
1987	Yugayen Yugayata		
1987	Kele Kella	Roshini's mother	
1988	Ko Hathuro		
1990	Jaya Kothanda		
1991	Paaradisaya		
1991	Salambak Handai		
1998	Aeya Obata Barai	Kumari's mother	
1999	Surangana Yahana		
