= Seda Sulang =

1955 Sri Lankan film

Seda Sulang සැඩසුළං
- Directed by: T. Somesekeran
- Screenplay by: T. Somesekeran
- Produced by: T. Somesekeran
- Starring: Florida Jayalath; Prem Jayanth; Dommie Jayawardena; David Dharmakeerthi
- Cinematography: Raj Gopal
- Edited by: T. N. Ram
- Music by: Susarla Dakshinamurthi
- Distributed by: Ceylon Films Ltd.
- Release date: 24 June 1955
- Country: Sri Lanka
- Language: Sinhala

Seda Sulang (Sinhala: සැඩසුළං), is a 1955 Sri Lankan romantic musical film directed and produced by Thambiraja Somasekaran for Ceylon Films Limited. The film starred Florida Jayalath and Prem Jayanth in lead roles and Dommie Jayawardena and David Dharmakeerthi in supportive roles.

== Cast ==
- Florida Jayalath as Seetha
- Prem Jayanth as Sunil
- Dommie Jayawardena as Eddie
- David Dharmakeerthi as Sir Edward Palipana
- Rosalyn Fernando as Mrs. Palipana
- Sujatha Paramanathan as Eddie's wife
- Lilian Edirisinghe
- (Alfred Gilbert De Mel)
- Piyadasa Gunasekera as Anton
- Richard Albert as Rodaya
- Sunil Premadasa as Rasthiyadu
- Mohideen Baig as Beggar
- Dharma Sri Ranatunga as Edward
- Shanti Abeysekara as Dancing teacher
- Daya Abeysekara as Young Sunil
- Padmini Dahanayake as Young Seetha
- Bimba Kumari as Leela
- T. Somasekaran
- M. P. Gilman

== Production ==
The film was filmed at the Vahini Studio in Madras, where Somasekaran included several scenes from Sri Lanka such as the Temple of the Tooth in Kandy, the Parliament in Colombo, Independence Memorial Hall and the Kadugannawa Bridge. They were captured on camera by Indian cameraman Raj Gopal. It is also the first and only Sinhala film where a song was sung by Indian singer Lata Mangeshkar.

The film premiered in Ceylon Theaters on June 24, 1955. It has been screened for 23 months and 2 months at the Elphinston Cinema Hall in Maradana alone. Until then, advertisements were most widely used in Sinhala cinema in this film. In addition, a calendar with a color photo of Florida sells for 50 cents and a postcard-size photo for 25 cents. On May 5, 1955, the Mayor of Colombo, Dr. N. M. Perera, distributed prizes at Galle Face Green at 9 am at the 'Sada Sulang' Bicycle Competition. The film was screened again on 17 December 1977 with 7 copies.

In violation of the agreement and played its aristocratic statue in the film by Dommie Jayawardena, Somasekaran took action against him to lodge a complaint in the Madras court. It was alleging that Dommie acted in the film Radala Piliruwa by breaking the agreement with Film Ceylon and had not come to work on the film without any notice since September 10, 1954, and that he had contracted with Cinemas Ltd. However, Somasekaran's complaint was dismissed subject to legal fees.

== Soundtrack ==
The film recorded 17 songs, which is by far the highest number of songs consisted in a Sinhala film.

No.	Title	Lyrics	Singer(s)	Length
1.	"Pem Kekulu Pipee"	D. T. Fernando	K. Jamuna Rani, A. M. Rajah
2.	"Sadawath Uthum"	Ananda Samarakoon	K. Jamuna Rani, Mohideen Baig
3.	"Jeevana Mea Gamana"	D. T. Fernando	K. Jamuna Rani, A. M. Rajah
4.	"Kawudu Maa Mawu"		K. Jamuna Rani
5.	"Prem Prem"		Dharmadasa Walpola, K. Rani
6.	"Koy Da Ma Jivithe"		Dharmadasa Walpola
7.	"Hari Saarai Mea"	D. T. Fernando	K. Jamuna Rani and chorus
8.	"Mohen Mula Welade"		Mohideen Baig, K. Jamuna Rani
9.	"Sri Lanka Matha Ma"	Ananda Samarakoon	Lata Mangeshkar and chorus
10.	"Idiriyata Yamu"	Ananda Samarakoon	Lata Mangeshkar, Mohideen Baig
11.	"Padmata Pol Thal Gahapala"	Ananda Samarakoon	Piyadasa Gunasekera and chorus
12.	"Kellani Numbala"	Ananda Samarakoon	Ananda Samarakoon, K. Rani
13.	"Oo Enna"	D. T. Fernando	K. Rani
14.	"Amu Pitisarayeki Me"	Ananda Samarakoon	K. Rani, Dharmadasa Walpola, Sunil Premadasa
15.	"Kavi Kada Kasi Soyala"		K. Rani, Dharmadasa Walpola
16.	"Oya Thamayi"		K. Rani, Sunil Premadasa
17.	"Aanay Yaanay"		Choir
18.	"Jeevana Mea Gamana (reprise)"	D. T. Fernando	K. Jamuna Rani, K. Rani
