= Dayananda Gunawardena =

- Born: Hettipathirannehelage Dayananda Gunawardena; 15 October 1934; Sri Lanka
- Died: 24 June 1993 (aged 58); General Hospital, Colombo
- Resting place: Udugampola, Ehelagahahena
- Other names: 'Jubal'
- Education: Ananda College
- Occupations: playwright actor, lyricist, Sri Lankan dramatist, radio play producer, and writer
- Years active: 1961-1993
- Spouse: Irangani Ranatunga
- Children: 3
- Website: dayanandagunawardena.org

Hettipathirannehelage Dayananda Gunawardena (Sinhala: දයානන්ද ගුනවර්ධන) (15 October 1934 – 24 June 1993), better known as Dayananda Gunawardena, was a Sri Lankan playwright, actor, lyricist, dramatist, radio play producer, and Sinhala Radio Play writer.

== Early life ==
Dayananda Gunawardena was born on 15 October 1934 in Halgampitiya, Udugampola Sri Lanka. His father, Don Simon, was an English teacher. Gunawardena completed his schooling at the Ugampola Government School (1943–46) and continued his education at the Veyngoda Government Secondary School (1946–51). Beginning in 1951, he attended Ananda College in Colombo.

While at school, he was active in many societies such as the drama society, in which he acted as the Junior Cadet Captain, and won the trophy of "best cadet".

Gunawardena also served as the vice-president of the college geographic society. At Ananda College he was awarded the D.B. Jayatilleke Literary Award and the Amarasena Art Award. In 1957 he joined the University of Peradeniya and completed his General Arts Qualifying Examination. He married Irangani Ranatunga of Gampaha on 28 September 1967 and they had three children.

== Career ==
=== Theater ===
Gundwardena's first notable play was Nari Bena (1961), based on a Sinhala folk story. During his time at Thurstan College as a Teacher Popular musician Lionel Algama helped write some of its memorable songs, such as "Ahala malin gas pirila balanna hari lassanai" and "Kumatada sobaniye kandulu salanne". It became popular and continued to be performed for forty years. His next play, Bakmaha Akunu (1962), based on the French drama The Marriage of Figaro, was made into a film. Kaamare Pore (1962), produced as a single stage drama in Sinhala, is an adaptation of the play Box and Cox by English playwright John Maddison Morton. It was first staged without songs. Gunawardena produced sixteen plays. Particularly notable are Gajaman Puwatha (1975) and Madhura Javanika (1983). He directed NariBena under the Cultural Exchange Programme (1978).

He formed the Nalu Kirthi Sabha Theatre Group in the 1970s. Gunawardena is credited with introducing docudramas to the Sinhala theatre and with showcasing the talent of Sinhala poet Gajaman Nona. His Gajaman Puwatha (1976) was the first Sinhala play to adopt the docudrama style. Another notable play of Gunawardana is Madhura Javanika (Joyous Scenes). This drama picks up the period of war between kings Rama and Ravana, noteworthy events in the country's history and the influence of the western invaders on Sri Lankan culture with the dramatized chronicle of the Hingala (Sinhala) people. It continues into modern times where women seek employment in Dubai as housemaids. In 2007 some of his plays were restaged in an attempt to raise funds for reviving public interest about his works.

=== Television ===
He produced programs for Sri Lanka Broadcasting Corporation (1961–1989). He directed programs there for Audio Research (1989–1990) and English Service (1990–1992).

== Education ==
He attended the International Student and Youth Festival (Moscow, 1957). He was the Sri Lankan Representative at the International Drama Federation and Study of Drama in Romania, Bulgaria, Czechoslovakia and Russia (1962). He was awarded the Commonwealth Scholarship for Study of Radio and Television at BBC by Sri Lanka Broadcasting Corporation (1966). He served as the Sri Lankan Representative at the First Television Festival of the Non-Aligned (1979). He conducted research on Buddhism and Korean Theatre following a scholarship awarded by the South Korean International Cultural Foundation (1991).

== Works ==
Gunawardena produced works for theatre, television and cinema:

=== Theatre ===
- Swarnathilaka– 1958 – Produced by Kegalu Vidyalaya Drama Society
- Paraassa – 1959 – Staged by National Drama Circle
- NariBena -1960 – First Production for Thurstan College Drama Society, 1961 – Second Production for Amateur Drama Society
- Kamare Pore – 1960 – Adaptation from English Drama "Box and Cox"
- Emathi Pattama– 1960 – Adaptation from the Bulgarian Drama "Golemanov"
- Pinguththara– 1961 – Produced by the Sinhala Society of the University of Colombo
- Bakmaha Akunu– 1963 – Adaptation of the French Drama "Marriage of Figaro" (Introduced the Revolving Stage to Sri Lanka for the first time)
- Denna Depole– 1964 – Produced from Hemasiri Prewardhana's script
- Jasaya Saha Lenchina– 1965
- Jeevana Vanchawa hewath Ibikatta– 1965
- Vikaraye Akaraya– 1967 – Produced for the Drama Festival of 'Lassana' Newspapers
- Kabaye Habe– 1971
- Padmawathi– 1974 – Produced along with Lakshman Jayakody after editing the original publication of Charles Dias
- Gajaman Puwatha – 1975
- Banku Natakaya – 1977 – Produced for the 10th Anniversary of the People's Bank
- Madhura Javanika– 1983 – Produced in association with Jones Overseas 1984 – Winner of Peace Award (Drama)
- Ananda Jawanika– 1986 – Awarded Best Direction and Special Award for Script at the 1987 State Drama Festival. In addition, certificates awarded for Best Music, Stage Management and Acting.
- Mathaka Bhaktha– 1990 – Produced on the invitation of the Police Sub Services Headquarters

=== Film ===
Bak maha Deege– 1969 (Following the Bakmaha Akunu Drama)

=== Performed films ===
- Kurulu Bedda
- Ran Salu
- Wesathuru Siritha
