= Sandhya Kumari =

Sri Lankan actress

Sandhya Kumari සන්ධ්‍යා කුමාරි
- Born: Jayasuriya Arachchige Dona Mary Yvonne Perera; January 6, 1945; Colombo, Sri Lanka
- Died: June 2, 1994 (aged 49); Colombo, Sri Lanka
- Occupation: Actress
- Years active: 1963-1991
- Spouse(s): Upali Perera (1968-1986); Shamal Atapattu (1992-1994)
- Children: 2

Jayasuriya Arachchige Dona Mary Yvonne Perera, better known as Sandhya Kumari (born 6 January 1945 – died 2 June 1994) was a popular Sri Lankan actress who frequently played femme fatale roles in early Sinhala cinema.

== Personal life ==
She was born on 6 January 1945 in Colombo. Kumari was married to Upali Perera.

== Career ==
Kumari's first film role was in the 1963 film Adata Wadiya Heta Hondai. Starring alongside Gamini Fonseka, Jeevarani Kurukulasooriya, Ananda Jayaratne, Nelson Karunagama and Vijitha Mallika, Kumari gained fame with the performance. She then appeared as the heroine in the tale of fisher folk, Dheewarayo, released in 1964. In 1965, she acted in Allapu Gedera.

Her other films include Patachara,Ipadunay Aiye?, Ran Rasa, Sura Chowraya (1967), Akka Nago, Amathikama, Ataweni Pudumaya, Bicycle Hora, Hangi Hora, Pini Bindu (1968), Kawda Hari, Sooraygeth Sooraya (1969; which featured a fight sequence between her and Sonia Dissanayake) and Sakuntala (1977).

Sandhya Kumari was an actress active during the 1960s, a period often referred to as the golden age of Sri Lankan cinema. She appeared in numerous films and worked alongside actors Gamini Fonseka as well as with directors Titus Thotawatte. Over the course of her career, she performed in more than 50 leading roles, including films such as Adata Wadiya Heta Hondai, Sapatha Soya, and Deewarayo.

Kumari died in 1994 at the age of 49. Twenty-five years later, her legacy in Sri Lankan cinema is still well known as seen by film journalist Sunil Leenus’s new publication “Cinamawe Nomiyana Daasa” – a look at Kumari’s contribution to the industry and a testament to her persona. Sandhya Kumari, an event hosted by Ceylon Cinema, was full of tributes and memories including a recollection of her life away from the camera made by Kumari’s second husband, Shamal Atapattu. Born in Kotahena on 6 January 1945, Dona Mary Yvonne Perera was later christened Sandhya Kumari following her first starring role.

Her ability to captivate audiences with her versatile acting and onscreen persona was admirable, as were her striking features that made her one of the initial sex symbols of local cinema culture. As Leenus’s book draws to attention, Kumari’s gaze was a part of her legacy as a servant of the silver screen, expressing nuanced and at times even subtle expressions through her eyes alone. Film critic Ajith Galappaththi, delivering the main speech for the evening, alluded as to why Kumari’s roles were mainly contained to commercial films when her range allowed her to tackle more mature and dramatic roles. He revealed that she was even preferred by Lester James Peries to play the role of Sarojini in his 1967 film “Ran Salu”. Galappaththi noted that Kumari ended up turning down many of those roles due to her familial commitments and at times due to the disapproval of her then husband, Upali Perera (although she was well known for her femme fatale roles).

Even as a sex symbol of the era, Sandhya maintained a self-conscious and neutral public image and thus forewent a foray into more serious work, even missing out on the possibility of subsequent international recognition. Many of the roles Kumari would have been considered for eventually went to Malini Fonseka, Galappaththi stated.

== Filmography ==
Year	Film	Role	Ref.
1963	Adata Vediya Heta Hondai	Sandhya	
1963	Udarata Menike		
1963	Deepashika	Mala	
1964	Dheewarayo	Rosalin	
1964	Patachara		
1964	Sasaraka Hati	Ranmali	
1964	Sithaka Mahima		
1964	Sujage Rahasa		
1965	Sepatha Soya	Anusha	
1965	Yata Giya Dawasa		
1965	Allapu Gedara	Nirmala	
1965	Satha Panaha	Sheela	
1966	Senasuma Kothanda	Maduri	
1966	Maha Ra Hamu Wu Sthriya	Lilian	
1966	Athulweema Thahanam		
1966	Sihina Hathak	Silvia Dunuthanna	
1966	Sampatha		
1966	Sudu Duwa		
1966	Oba Dutu Da		
1966	Senasili Suwaya	Amila Weerasinghe	
1967	Magul Poruwa		
1967	Ran Rasa	Nalini	
1967	Ipadune Ai?		
1967	Okkoma Hari	Manika	
1967	Sura Chaurya		
1968	Pini Bindu		
1968	Akka Nago		
1968	Bicycle Hora		
1968	Amathikama		
1968	Hangi Hora		
1968	Ataweni Pudumaya		
1969	Narilatha	Devika	
1969	Kawuda Hari?	Subashini Weerasinghe	
1969	Surayangeth Suraya		
1972	Singapore Charlie		
1977	Neela		
1977	Sakunthala		
1978	Sithaka Suwanda	Vijay's female friend	
1978	Anupama	Mrs. Silva	
1991	Alibaba Saha Horu Hathaliha		
1991	Hithata Dukak Nethi Miniha		
