= Ruby de Mel =

Sri Lankan actress (1917–2004)

Ruby Jasmine de Mel රූබි ද මැල්
- Born: Ruby Jasmine de Mel; 4 December 1917; Moratuwa, Sri Lanka
- Died: 8 November 2004 (aged 86); Rajagiriya
- Other names: Vinodha Rasanjali
- Education: Princess of Wales' College; Newstead Girls College
- Occupations: Actress, Dramatist, Director
- Years active: 1955–2003

Ruby Jasmine de Mel (born as රූබි ද මැල්) [Sinhala]; 4 December 1917 – 8 November 2004) was an actress in Sri Lankan cinema, stage drama, and television. She is best known for her acting in the films Siriyalatha, Kawata Andare, and Nalangana as well her role as Granny in the television serial Amba Yahaluwo. She died on 8 November 2004.

== Personal life ==
De Mel was born in Moratuwa Kaldemulla area to an Anglicized Sinhala family as the youngest of a family with 12 siblings. Her father was James Perera and mother was Mary Liyanora. She attended to Princess of Wales' College, Moratuwa and Newstead Girls College, Negombo. She was an announcer for Radio Ceylon at its inception. She married at the age of 17 and then divorced when she was 27 years old.

== Acting career ==
de Mel broke into acting with a role in the theatrical play Handahana directed by T. B. Ilangaratne. This performance drew the attention of leading playwright and filmmaker B. A. W. Jayamanne who asked her to play a part in his film Mathabedaya (1955) to be shot in India. Under the pretense of a vacation with friends (due to disapproval by her family), de Mel travelled to India and made her film debut in the film under the alias Vinodha Rasanjali. She reverted to her real name after her first few films.

de Mel would go on to appear in such films as Perakadoru Baana (1955), Daiva Vipakaya (1956), Suraya, Siriyalatha, Surasena (1957), Kawata Andare, Nalangana (1960), Kala Kala De Pala Pala De, Chandali (1964), Handapana (1965), Magul Poruwa (1967), Bicycle Hora (1968), Hari Maga (1969), Penawa Neda (1970), Ihatha Athmaya (1972), Aparadaya Saha Danduwama, Sinawai Inawai (1973), Bambaru Awith (1978), Thana Giravi (1983), Mangala Thagga, Kawuluwa and Obatai Priye Adare (1987). She was also one of the Sri Lankan actors picked to appear in the villager scene in Indiana Jones and the Temple of Doom (1984) alongside D. R. Nanayakkara, Denawaka Hamine, Iranganie Serasinghe, Jessica Wickremasinghe, Oswald Jayasinghe and Dharmadasa Kuruppu.

de Mel branched out as a director in 1967 with Pipene Kumudu which featured the maiden role of actress Sumana Amarasinghe. de Mel made her way into television in the 1980s with roles in the television serials Pinmada Puthun, Rankahawunu and Amba Yahaluwo.

Later on in her life, de Mel donated her house in Moratuwa to function as a center for handicapped children and moved to the St. Andrew’s Home for Elders at Rajagiriya. She died on 8 November 2004.

== Filmography ==
Wakishta started her film career with B.A.W. Jayamanne's 1955 film Mathabhedaya. Then she acted more than 75 films. Some of his popular acting came through films such as Bambaru Awith, Akkara Paha, Sikuruliya and Ahas Maliga.

Year	Film	Role	Ref.
1955	Mathabhedaya		
1955	Perakadoru Bena		
1956	Dosthara	Chandra's mother	
1957	Siriyalatha	Sirimanne's mother	
1957	Soorasena	Shanthi	
1959	Sihinaya		
1959	Hadisi Vivahaya		
1960	Kawata Andare	Queen consort	
1960	Nalangana	Sunil's mother	
1963	Mangalika		
1964	Kala Kala De Pala Pala De		
1964	Dheewarayo		
1964	Sithaka Mahima		
1964	Chandali	Saliya's mother	
1965	Landaka Mahima	Mother	
1965	Handapaana		
1965	Hithata Hitha		
1965	Allapu Gedara	Kapila's mother	
1965	Sonduru Yuwala		
1966	Kapatikama	Sisira's mother	
1966	Sihina Hathak	Mabel	
1967	Pipena Kumudu		
1967	Magul Poruwa		
1968	Abuddassa Kale		
1968	Bicycle Hora		
1969	Hari Maga	Kusuma	
1969	Pancha		
1970	Akkara Paha	Mrs. Perera	
1970	Thewatha		
1970	Penawa Neda		
1971	Kathuru Muwath	Susil's mother	
1972	Ihatha Athmaya	Priyani's mother	
1973	Mathara Achchi	Cyril's mother	
1973	Aparadaya Saha Daduwama		
1973	Sinawai Inawai		
1974	Hadawath Naththo		
1974	Sagarika		
1975	Mage Nangi Shyama		
1975	Sikuruliya	Balasooriya Hamu	
1976	Mangalaa		
1977	Hithuwoth Hithuwamai	Mrs. Ranaweera	
1978	Chandi Shyama		
1978	Bambaru Avith	Selestina, Helen's mother	
1978	Deepanjali		
1979	Savudan Jema		
1980	Para Dige		
1981	Samawenna	Mrs. Samaranayake	
1981	Ran Ethana		
1982	Kadawunu Poronduwa remake	Jayasena Hamine	
1982	Thana Giraw	Doctor	
1982	Ayachana	Sarojini's mother	
1982	Anuradha		
1982	Halo Shyama		
1982	Biththi Hathara	Samara's mother	
1983	Sister Mary	Mother Superior	
1983	Monarathenna 2		
1984	Valle Thanu Maliga	Katherine	
1984	Hitha Honda Kollek		
1984	Indiana Jones and the Temple of Doom	Villager	
1984	Podi Ralahamy	Ralahamy's elder sister	
1985	Chalitha Rangali		
1986	Mal Warusa	Kumarihamy	
1986	Pooja		
1986	Aadara Hasuna		
1987	Obatai Priye Adare	Rita Madam	
1987	Thaththi Man Adarei		
1987	Mangala Thagga	Mrs. Sivalingam	
1987	Kawuluwa		
1987	Ahinsa	Party guest	
1990	Hima Gira		
1991	Keli Madala	Samara's aunt	
1991	Suwandena Suwandak		
1992	Okkoma Kanapita		
1993	Jeevan Malli		
1994	Ahas Maliga		
1994	Ambu Samiyo	Mother	
1994	Okkoma Hondatai	Freddi's mother	
1996	Sathi		

== Awards and Accolades ==
- Honorary Degree - Given by International Open University

=== United Lanka Fan Society Film Festival ===
Year	Nominee / work	Award	Result
1965	Dheewarayo	Best Supporting Actress	Won

=== Sarasaviya Film Festival ===
Year	Nominee / work	Award	Result
1965	Dheewarayo	Jury Award	Won
1995	Contribution to cinema	Rana Thisara Award	Won
