= Vijitha Mallika =

Sri Lankan actress and film producer

Vijitha Mallika විජිත මල්ලිකා
- Born: Gamamathige Vijitha de Silva; 5 July 1943; Negombo, Sri Lanka
- Died: 16 October 1992 (aged 49); Anugurukaara Mulla, Negombo
- Education: Newstead Girls College
- Occupations: Actress, film producer
- Years active: 1957–1980
- Spouses: Anton Fernando; Gamini Munasinghe
- Children: 4
- Parents: Gamamathige Silva (father); Mary Wickramasinghe (mother)

Gamamathige Vijitha de Silva (born 5 July 1943 – died 16 October 1992 as විජිත මල්ලිකා) [Sinhala]), popularly known as Vijitha Mallika, was an actress in Sri Lankan cinema. One of the most popular film actresses in early Sinhala cinema, Mallika appeared in more than 40 films including popular films, Suvineetha Lalani, Sengawunu Menika, Dheewarayo, London Hamu and Sweep Ticket.

== Personal life ==
Mallika was born on 5 July 1943 in Negombo as the eldest of the family. Her father Gamamathige Silva was a businessman came to Negambo from Induruwa and started a business. Her mother was Mary Wickramasinghe. Mallika has three younger brothers and two younger sisters.

Mallika studied at Sinhala New School, Wella Street, Negombo and then from Newstead Girls College, Negambo. Mallika was married to fellow actor Anton Fernando. She met Fernando during the casting of Veera Vijaya. At that time, Anton was the harmonium player of a band in Negombo. Anton and Vijitha's love affair had obstacles from both sides, due to religious conflicts. Mallika was Buddhist and Anton was Catholic. Later, Mallika converted to Catholicism and married Anton. For this, a religious father by the name of Pagna and a religious mother by the name of Mannah had to be named. However, after many conflicts, they divorced in 1970.

A few years later, she married Gamini Munasinghe, a businessman in Negombo. After marrying Munasinghe, Vijitha returned to Buddhism. Gamini's brother, Ananda Munasinghe was married to the eldest daughter of actor and director B. A. W. Jayamanne.

Mallika has two daughters from her first marriage with Anton. Mallika has one son and one daughter from her second marriage with Gamini.

Mallika died from cancer on 16 October 1992 at the age of 49.

== Career ==
At very young age, Mallika showcased the signs to be a future actress. Mallika's uncle, Benjamin Fernando often known as Benjamin Master was a friend of playwright and dialogue writer Hugo Fernando. When Hugo saw her at the house, she expressed her intentions to be an actress. With that guidance from Hugo Master, Mallika made her cinema debut as a minor role in 1957 film Suraya directed by T.R. Sundaram. She was then offered many comic roles in popular films, Sohoyuro (1958), Purusha Rathnaya (1959). Then, in 1960, she acted as the girl friend opposite to Cristy Leonard in the film Veera Vijaya.

Hugo Master, who wrote the dialogue for the film Adata Wada Heta Hondai which was started in 1962 by newly established Hendala Wijaya studio gave a major role to Mallika along with two popular actresses of her generation, Jeevarani Kurukulasuriya and Sandhya Kumari. Mallika was Ananda Jayaratne's girlfriend in the film. Then he acted in the film Samanalayo starring with Tony Ranasinghe. Although the footage was filmed, it was stuck in production stage. In 1963, Mallika appeared in the blockbuster film Dheewarayo along with Sandhya Kumari and Gamini Fonseka. According to critics, Mallika lost the main role after losing the toss to decide the role with Sandhya. Sandhya made a major role and Mallika made a supportive role. However, her destiny was changed after the film, where Mallika was fortunate enough to get major roles in films in following years.

Mallika acted major roles in films Hithata Hitha, Sweep Ticket and Handa Paana. Mallika's lover in the movie Sweep Ticket was Sudesh Gunaratne. In the film Handa Paana, she acted as a village girl Kusuma opposite to Herbert M. Seneviratne. Among the films Mallika acted in, 1963 film Suhada Sohoyuro gained more attraction. In 1966, Mallika won the Sarasaviya Award for Most Popular Actress for the film Handa Paana. In 1970, Mallika produced the film Suli Sulang which was directed by her husband Anton Fernando before the divorce. Her last appearance in cinema came through 1980 film Hondin Inna directed by Bandu Gunasekara.

A felicitation ceremony titled Dawasak Evi for Vijitha Mallika was held on 18 March 2017 at Maradana Tower Hall.

== Filmography ==
Year	Film	Role	Ref.
1957	Suraya		
1958	Sohoyuro		
1959	Purusha Rathnaya	Mallika	
1960	Nalangana		
1960	Veera Vijaya		
1961	Suvineetha Lalani		
1963	Adata Vediya Heta Hondai	Vijitha	
1963	Suhada Sohoyuro		
1963	Mangalika		
1964	Kala Kala De Pala Pala De		
1964	Semiya Birindage Deviyaya		
1964	Sujage Rahasa		
1964	Dheewarayo		
1965	Handa Paana		
1965	Laa Dalu		
1965	Hathara Maha Nidhanaya	Seetha Dharmawardena	
1965	Hithata Hitha		
1965	Sweep Ticket		
1965	Landaka Mahima		
1966	Segawena Sewanella		
1966	Sanda Naga Eddi		
1966	Layata Laya		
1966	Kapatikama	Veeta	
1966	Sudu Duwa		
1966	Senasili Suwaya	Mali	
1967	Ran Rasa	Mallika 'Missy'	
1967	Okkoma Hari		
1967	Hathara Kendare		
1967	Segawunu Menika		
1967	Amathaka Wunada		
1967	Sarana		
1967	Rena Giraw	Sumana	
1968	London Hamu		
1968	Dehadaka Duka	Kamala	
1968	Singithi Surathal		
1968	Abuddassa Kale		
1969	Oba Nathinam		
1969	Hari Maga	Cilla	
1969	Pancha		
1970	Seda Sulang		
1976	Haratha Hathara		
1976	Asha		
1980	Hondin Inna		
