= Suvineetha Weerasinghe =

Sri Lankan actress

Suvineetha Weerasinghe සුවිනීතා වීරසිංහ
- Born: Suvineetha Weerasinghe; May 19, 1947 (age 79); Dehiwala
- Other names: Suvineetha Abeysekera; Suvineetha Kongahage
- Occupation: Actress
- Years active: 1962–present
- Spouse(s): Tissa Abeysekara; Sarath Kongahage
- Children: Devinda Kongahage
- Awards: Merit Award

Suvineetha Weerasinghe (born May 19, 1947 as සුවිනීතා වීරසිංහ) [Sinhala]), is an actress in Sri Lankan cinema theater and television. Highly versatile actress with a career spanning more than five decades, Weerasinghe has portrayed many critically acclaimed films such as Sikuruliya, Welikathara, Yuganthaya and Sudo Sudu.

== Personal life ==
Her father was an ex-gunman in the Army and her mother was a housewife. She started junior school at Buddhist Girls College in Mount Lavinia until grade 5 and then attended to Dehiwela Madya Maha Vidyalaya. At the school, she was an athlete and a strong netball shooter. She also completed all three stages of Kandyan dancing at school times. After finishing school, she enrolled at Indigenous Medical College for a four-year course. However, while studying in the third year, Weerasinghe quit medical college and entered the cinema industry.

She was first married to the late Tissa Abeysekara, who was a renowned director in Sinhala cinema. She has one son from her second marriage with Sarath Kongahage. Her son Devinda Kongahage is also a director in Sinhala cinema.

== Acting career ==
In television, she acted in some critically acclaimed serials such as H. D. Premaratne's Sandun Gira Gini Ganee and Dharmasena Pathiraja's adaptation of Anton Chekhov's Lady with the Little Dog.

=== Selected television serials ===
- Bim Kaluwara
- Kaluwara Anduna
- Nonimi Yathra
- Piniwassa
- Ran Dalambuwo
- Sandun Giri Gini Ganee
- Wansakkarayo

== Beyond acting ==
She was one of the judges reality show Guwan Prathibha Prabha in the drama category.

She contested from National List of Democratic National Alliance in 2010 General Election.

== Filmography ==
Her maiden cinematic experience came through 1962 film Suhada Divi Piduma, directed by Robin Tampoe. Some of her popular films are Sudo Sudu, Sikuruliya Anupama and Welikathara.

Key
| † | Denotes films that have not yet been released |

| Year | Film | Role | Ref. |
|---|---|---|---|
| 1962 | Suhada Divi Piduma | | |
| 1963 | Sudu Sande Kalu Wala | Wasanthi | |
| 1964 | Samajaye Api Okkoma Samanai | Ranjani | |
| 1965 | Sudo Sudu | Heen Menika | |
| 1966 | Delovak Athara | Chitra Karunaratne | |
| 1971 | Welikathara | Geetha Randeniya, ASP's wife | |
| 1975 | Sikuruliya | Vandigeera Arachchilage Namali Kanthilatha | |
| 1976 | Loka Horu | | |
| 1976 | Hulavali | Subha | |
| 1977 | Sakunthala | | |
| 1978 | Siri Pathula | Menaka | |
| 1978 | Anupama | Anupama | |
| 1978 | Saara | | |
| 1980 | Sasaraka Pathum | Doctor Shanthi | |
| 1980 | Ektam Ge | Devika | |
| 1982 | Malata Noena Bambaru | | |
| 1983 | Sandamali | Sandamali | |
| 1983 | Thuththiri Mal | | |
| 1984 | Jaya Sikurui | | |
| 1984 | Sathi Pooja | Mrs. Wijesekara | |
| 1985 | Yuganthaya | Nalika, Kabilana's wife | |
| 1985 | Channai Kello Dennai | | |
| 1987 | Janelaya | Mrs. Fernando | |
| 1997 | Bawa Duka | Arachchi hamine | |
| 1997 | Bawa Karma | Arachchi hamine | |
| 1998 | Dehena | | |
| 2000 | Hansa Vilapaya | | |
| 2000 | Pem Kekula | | |
| 2001 | Daru Upatha | | |
| 2004 | Mille Soya | Maxi's Mother | |
| 2004 | Rajjumala | | |
| 2010 | Ira Handa Yata | Herath Manike | |
| 2017 | Bandhanaya | Selestina | |
| 2018 | Wassanaye Sanda | Sandesh's mother | |
| TBA | Sihina Lowak Soya † | | |
| TBA | Saadhi † | | |

== Awards ==
=== Presidential Film Awards ===
| Year | Nominee / work | Award | Result |
|---|---|---|---|
| 1985 | Sathi Pooja | Merit Award | Won |
