= Titus Thotawatte =

Sri Lankan director

- Born: Thotawattege Don Manuel Titus de Silva; 17 April 1927; Colombo, Sri Lanka
- Died: 15 October 2011 (aged 84)
- Education: Ananda College, Colombo, Heywood Institute of Art
- Occupations: film director, screenwriter, editor

Thotawattege Don Manuel Titus de Silva (Sinhala:ටයිටස් තොටවත්ත), popularly known as Titus Thotawatte, was a Sri Lankan director and editor who made several popular Sri Lankan action movies in the 1960s and 1970s and later developed Sinhala children's programmes. Thotawatte died on 15 October 2011 in Colombo.

== Early life ==
He was born on 17 April 1927 in Colombo. He was the second child in a family of three, with an elder brother and a younger sister. He attended Ananda College in Colombo and studied art under J.D.A. Perera and Stanley Abeysinghe and Matara Technical College.

== Career ==
Thottawatte joined Lester James Peries and Willie Blake as editor to make Rekava in 1956. It was an attempt to make a truly Sinhalese movie in contrast with the Southern Indian copies then in vogue.

Thottawatte debuted as a director with Chandiya in 1965. The film starred Gamini Fonseka in the first villains role of Sinhala Cinema. Other early films include Kauda Hari (1969), Thewatha (1970) and Haralaksaya (1971).

In 1980, Thotawatte wrote and directed the children's movie Handaya, which was awarded Best Picture at the Sarasaviya Film Festival.

In the 1980s and 1990s, he dubbed English cartoons such as Bugs Bunny, Doctor Dolittle and Top Cat into Sinhala for Sinhalese audiences with the popular titles Ha Ha Hari Hawa, Dosthara Honda Hitha and Pissu Pusa respectively. He is considered to be the pioneer of dubbing programmes in Sri Lanka. These continue to air on Sinhala Television channels. Thotawatte created puppet characters like Eluson.

When the first National Media Awards took place in Sri Lanka, Thotawatte, was awarded a gold medal for his contribution to television and media in Sri Lanka.

== Filmography ==
Year	Film	Roles	Ref.
1956	Rekava	Film Editor	
1960	Sandesaya	Film Editor	
1962	Daskon	Film Editor, Technical Advisor	
1962	Ranmuthu Duwa	Film Editor	
1964	Getawarayo	Film Editor	
1964	Dheewarayo	Film Editor	
1965	Saaravita	Film Editor	
1965	Chandiya	Director, Screenwriter, Film Editor	
1966	Parasathu Mal	Film Editor	
1967	Sorungeth Soru	Film Editor	
1967	Vasanthi	Film Editor	
1968	Punchi Baba	Film Editor	
1969	Baduth Ekka Horu	Film Editor	
1969	Hanthane Kathawa	Film Editor	
1969	Kawuda Hari	Director, Film Editor	
1970	Thevetha	Director, Screenwriter, Film Editor	
1971	Haaralakshe	Director, Screenwriter, Film Editor	
1972	Atheethayen Kathawak	Assistant Director, Film Editor	
1974	Sihasuna	Director, Film Editor, Producer	
1974	Sagarika	Director, Film Editor	
1975	Sikuruliya	Film Editor	
1976	Mangala	Director, Screenwriter, Film Editor	
1977	Maruwa Samaga Wase	Eddie. Director, Film Editor	
1979	Handaya	Director, Screenwriter, Film Editor	
