= Asoka Ponnamperuma =

Sri Lankan actor, singer and filmmaker

Asoka Ponnamperuma අශෝක පොන්නම්පෙරුම
- Born: Samaraweera Asoka Ponnamperuma; May 3, 1936; Colombo, Sri Lanka
- Died: April 2, 1993 (aged 56); Colombo
- Education: Ananda College
- Occupations: Actor, Dramatist, Singer, Director
- Years active: 1948–1984
- Spouse: Manel Lona Elizabeth Perera (m. 1965)
- Children: 4
- Awards: Best Supporting Actor

Samaraweera Asoka Ponnamperuma (born 3 May 1936 – died 2 April 1993 as අශෝක පොන්නම්පෙරුම) [Sinhala]) was an actor in Sri Lankan cinema as well as a singer, scriptwriter and filmmaker. Considered as "Sri Lanka's Sivaji Ganeshan", Ponnamperuma has acted more than 40 films in a career spanned for more than three decades.

== Personal life ==
He was born on 3 May 1936 in Colombo. His father Don Charles Ponnamperuma was a journalist, who worked as editor-in-chief of the Buddhist paper Sinhala Bauddhaya in 1950. His mother was Premawansha Mithrawaththa. Ashoka completed his education from Ananda College.

He was married to a fellow film actress, Manel Lona Elizabeth Perera. The wedding was celebrated on 4 December 1965. Manel first acted in the film Deepashika and then appeared in few films such as Sihina Hathak, Sekaya, Layata Laya, Ruhunu Kumari and Sanda Nega Eddi. The couple has three sons - Anuradha, Sumedha, Chaminda and one daughter, Manjula. Asoka and Manel co-acted in few films such as Layata Laya, Dehadaka Duka, Ruhunu Kumari and London Hamu.

He died on 2 April 1993 at the age of 56 from heart attack. Although all funeral work is to be completed within 24 hours after his death, his request was unable to comply due to curfew in the country and the delay in the post mortem.

== Career ==
At the age of 14, he started to act in school stage dramas. Then he mastered music under R. A. Chandrasena. He won the first place in all island music competition in that year, which got the attention from musician Lionel Edirisinghe. Asoka met his acting hero L. M. Perera in a tea shop and asked about acting in a film. After few days, he received a message about a role and moved to Colombo. In 1958, his maiden cinema acting came through the film Suneetha directed by P. Neelakantan with a dual role. Then he acted in many popular films such as Sihinaya, Sundara Birinda, Suwineetha Lalani, Ganthera and Samiya Birindage Deviyaya. In 1969, he won the award for the Best Supporting actor for the film Indunila at Sarasaviya Film Festival.

Asoka wrote the book Mal Manda Bisaw which is based on a true story about a prostitute that he met at Maradana Police Station. Then he wrote the book Ai Mata Mehema Une. By using the book, he script his first film direction Pradeepa which was screened on 2 July 1982.

== Filmography ==
Year	Film	Role	Ref.
1958	Suneetha		
1958	Sihinaya		
1959	Sirimali		
1960	Sundara Birinda		
1961	Ganthera		
1961	Suvineetha Lalani		
1962	Suhada Divi Piduma		
1963	Suhada Sohoyuro		
1964	Heta Pramada Wadi		
1964	Kala Kala De Pala Pala De		
1964	Subasarana Sapa Sithe		
1964	Samiya Birindage Deviyaya	Doctor Nihal	
1964	Patachara		
1964	Sasaraka Hati		
1964	Sithaka Mahima		
1965	Sathutu Kandulu		
1965	Hithata Hitha		
1965	Sweep Ticket		
1966	Athulweema Thahanam		
1966	Layata laya		
1966	Sudu Duwa		
1966	Sanda Naga Eddi		
1966	Sanasili Suwaya		
1966	Maha Re Hamuwu Sthriya		
1967	Ranrasa		
1967	Ipadune Ai		
1967	Iwasana Dana		
1968	London Hamu		
1968	Hangi Hora		
1968	Indunila		
1968	Dehadaka Duka		
1969	Kohomada Wade		
1969	Pick Poket		
1969	Pancha		
1973	Suhada Pathuma	Lalitha's husband	
1973	Sinavai Inavai		
1974	Shanthi		
1975	Hadawathaka Wasanthaya	Sriyani's father	
1975	Damayanthi		
1975	Sadhana		
1976	Ran Thilaka		
1977	Sudu Paraviyo	Vasala Nilame	
1979	Jeevana Kandulu		
1979	Ran Kurullo	Soysa	
1984	Kokila		
