= Alfred Edirimanne =

Sri Lankan film actor (1929–2000)

Alfred Edirimanne ඇල්ෆ්‍රඩ් එදිරිමාන්න
- Born: Alfred Edirimanne; 25 March 1929; Nugegoda, Sri Lanka
- Died: 27 November 2000 (aged 71); Colombo
- Other names: Lawrence College, Maradana; Sri Lanka College, Maradana
- Occupations: Actor, film enthusiast, social activist, politician
- Years active: 1952–1990
- Political party: Sri Lanka Freedom Party

Alfred Edirimanne (born 25 March 1929 – died 27 November 2000 as ඇල්ෆ්‍රඩ් එදිරිමාන්න) [Sinhala]), was an actor in Sri Lankan cinema as well as a film enthusiast, social activist and politician. He was one of the main pioneers for the establishment of the State Film Corporation and also a member of the Indian Film Protest Movement.

== Personal life ==
Edirimanne was born on 25 March 1929 in Koswatte, Nugegoda as the fifth of the family with 8 siblings. His father was Jokin Edirimanne, was a well known businessman in Gampaha. His mother was Caroline Edirimanne, a native of Galle. He was educated at Lawrence College, Maradana and Sri Lanka College, Maradana.

After the school times, he joined the government clerkship. He also worked at public service of the Ports Commission.

Edirimanne was married to Sumana Liyanage Wehihena, a nurse. He met her at Colombo Eye Hospital when Edirimanne had a bad sickness and Sumana came to eye hospital to take a nurse exam as a student nurse. He had to wait 21 days in the hospital until healed where he started a close relationship with the nurse. When Edirimanne recovered, he went to the hospital and met Sumana and told her that he wanted to get married. However, the nursing law states that any nurse who goes to nursing is not allowed to marry for six years. After 7 years and Sumana became the head staff nurse at the Colombo Eye Hospital, they got married on March 31, 1966. Sumana was a past pupil of Navathagala Central College, Elpitiya. The couple have two daughters and two sons. Eldest daughter is Bimba Yashodhari Rajika and second son is Chintaka Devinda Chandima. The next daughter is Gayathri Prajapati Purna and the youngest son is Lakwijaya Harindra Wansanatha.

After a brief illness, he walked with the help of clutches for a while. Edirimanne died on 27 November 2000 at the age of 71.

== Career ==
He first acted in radio dramas written by Sirisena Wimalaweera titled Guwan Viduli Rangamadala. He voiced in radio plays, Kurulu Bedda, Landesi Doopatha, Vajira, Monarathenna, Yakage Wanguwa, Aes Deka, Sugandhika, Gajamuthu and Sandagalathenna. Then he was selected for the stage drama Handahana produced by T.B. Ilangaratne. Then he had the opportunity to act as an "elderly Mudliyar" in the 1953 Manthri Hamuduruwo wrote by Ilangaratne.

Edirimanne missed the opportunity to act in the film Radala Piliruwa due to inability to take leave from the public service of the Ports Commission. Then he was selected to play as a "Catholic father" in the film Duppathage Duka. During this time, he acted in the short film Wessanthara. In 1954, he acted in the stage drama Kulu Harak produced by P. Welikala as well as some other plays such as Kalagola and Sivamma Dhanapala. In the meantime he emerges as a drama producer with the stage drama Handapana. He started cinema career with the main role as "Sarath" in the 1957 film Suraya. The fans fell in love with the character of this movie until he acted in a vicious behavior as the owner of the club, "Vicky" in the film Nalangana which made the audience disgusted.

It is noteworthy that at a very young age, he got the role of an old man or an elderly father because he played old roles in radio dramas. All these old roles came after Edirimanne played the role of "Dingiri Appu" in the 1963 movie Udarata Menike. He acted in several commercially successful films including Adata Vediya Heta Hondai, Laa Dalu, Maha Ra Hamuwu Sthriya, Seegiri kashyapa, Athma Pooja, Pipena Kumudu, Singapore Charlie and Lokuma Hinawa. Edirimanne also contributed to few early television serials such as Ranmasu Uyana, Kabalen Lipata and Navodaye Arunalu.

== Beyond acting ==
Edirimanne was a beloved member of Sri Lanka Freedom Party. In 1989, he contested in Kotte Municipal Council from Sri Lanka Freedom Party but defeated despite contesting from the party. He was the deputy secretary when Gamini Fonseka headed the Local Film Actors' Union, which was formed in early 1966. In 1970s he spoke at hundreds of election meetings of Sirimavo Bandaranaike to liberate Sinhala cinema from the film monopoly. In 1972, under his efforts, State Film Corporation was founded.

== Filmography ==
=== As actor ===
Year	Film	Role	Ref.
1957	Suraya	Sarath	
1958	Deyyange Rate		
1960	Nalangana	Vicky	
1960	Wana Mala		
1960	Veera Vijaya		
1963	Adata Vediya Heta Hondai	Alfred	
1963	Udarata Menike	Dingiri Appu	
1965	Laa Dalu		
1966	Maha Ra Hamuwu Sthriya	Wilbert	
1967	Pipena Kumudu		
1970	Athma Pooja		
1972	Singapore Charlie		
1972	Hathara Wate		
1972	Lokuma Hinawa	Sari Mudalali	
1978	Vishmaya	Diyonis 'Rala'	
1979	Eka Hitha		
1982	Pradeepa		
1988	Durga		
1990	Jaya Shakthi		
