= Prem Jayanth =

Sri Lankan actor (1933–1997)

Prem Jayanth ප්‍රේම් ජයන්ත්
- Born: Hettiarachchige Emmanuel Aloysius Rodrigo; 1933; Grandpass, Sri Lanka
- Died: 17 March 1997 (aged 64); Colombo
- Occupation: Actor
- Years active: 1942-1984
- Spouse: Nanda Leelanayake
- Children: 7
- Relatives: Umaria Sinhawansa

Hettiarachchige Emanuel Aloysius Rodrigo (1933–17 March 1997), better known as Prem Jayanth, was an actor in Sri Lankan cinema as well as a producer and art director. Considered as the first male superstar in Sinhala cinema, Jayanth rose to prominence with starring roles in the popular films Sujatha (1953) and Seda Sulang (1955).

== Personal life ==
Jayanth was born in Layards Broadway, Grandpass and attended Joseph’s College, Grandpass and St. Lucia's College Colombo 13.

Jayanth married actress Nanda Leelanayake sometime in the 1960s and had seven children, two boys - Jagath and Janith - and five girls - Sunila, Sandhya, Anusha, Nirma and Shiroma. His son, Jagath Rohan appeared in few film including the 1980 film Sabeetha.

Jayanth died on 17 March 1997 at the age of 64. Nanda died on 26 September 2014 at the age of 84.

== Cinema career ==
He entered the school stage. In 1932, he first joined the public stage through the stage drama Carnival produced by A. D. J. Mathupala.

Jayanth began his film career with a small role in the 1952 film Unmathu Wishwasaya directed by B. A. W. Jayamanne. His breakthrough came when he was cast in the lead male role in the 1953 film Sujatha opposite Florida Jayalath. The film became a big hit and established Jayanth and Jayalath as major stars. They reappeared together in the 1955 film Seda Sulang which was also popular featuring the only songs sung by Lata Mangeshkar for a Sri Lankan film. Jayanth had a major role in Warada Kageda in 1953.

Jayanth subsequently acted in Awishwasaya, Purusha Rathnaya (1959) and Sithaka Mahima (1964) before reuniting with Jaylath in her directorial effort Sweep Ticket (1965). In 1967 he portrayed a role in Sarana directed by Ashoka David. He quit from acting after the film Sarana.

Jayanth started his company Seven Arts around 1972 and produced such films as Sahanaya (1972), Hondata Hondai (1973), Kawda Raja (1976), Sabeetha (1980), Senasuma (1981) and Mala Giravi (1984). He was also active as a designer of film cutouts and was the art director of Wahal Doopatha (1968) and Deviyani Oba Kohida (1977).

== Filmography ==
Year	Film	Role	Other roles
1952	Umathu Vishwasaya		
1953	Sujatha	Nihal	
1953	Puduma Leli	Raja	
1954	Warada Kageda	Rohith	
1955	Seda Sulang	Sunil	
1958	Salli Malli Salli		
1959	Aviswasaya	Vijay	
1959	Purusha Rathnaya	Vijithapala	
1964	Heta Pramada Wedi	Saman	
1964	Suba Sarana Sepa Sithe		
1964	Sithaka Mahima		
1965	Sweep Ticket		
1967	Sarana		Producer
1968	Wahal Doopatha		Art director
1971	Sahanaya		Producer
1971	Samanala Kumariyo		Art Director
1973	Hondata Hondai		Producer, Assistant Director
1976	Kawuda Raja		Producer
1980	Sabeetha		Producer
1981	Senasuma		Producer, Dialogue Writer
1983	Sandamali		Title Writer
1984	Mala Giravi		Producer
