= Sandesaya =

- Directed by: Lester James Peries
- Written by: Lester James Peries; K. A. W. Perera; Benedict Dodampegama
- Produced by: K. Gunaratnam
- Starring: Ananda Jayaratne; Kanthi Gunatunga; Gamini Fonseka
- Cinematography: William Blake
- Edited by: Titus De Silva
- Music by: Sunil Santha
- Release date: 1960
- Running time: 120 minutes
- Country: Sri Lanka
- Language: Sinhala

Sandesaya (Sinhalese language word meaning The Message) is a 1960 Sri Lankan film directed by Lester James Peries. The film is based on the war between the Sinhalese people and the Portuguese invaders in Sri Lanka. It was produced by K. Gunaratnam on behalf of the Cinemas Company on the request of Raj Kapoor.

== Plot ==
A band of guerrillas led by Bandara (Ananda Jayaratne) lead a resistance against Portuguese invaders. Bandara is in love with Sumana (Kanthi Gunatunga).

=== Cast ===
- Ananda Jayaratne as Bandara
- Kanthi Gunatunga as Sumana
- Gamini Fonseka as Dhamitha
- David Dharmakeerthi as Disapathi Ekanayake 'Disawa'
- Arthur Van Langenberg as Captain Antony Rodrigo
- Vincent Vaas as Sandeshaya Carrier
- Hugo Fernando as Vithana Rala
- Eddie Jayamanne as Mamma
- Shane Gunaratne as Sira
- Iranganie Serasinghe as Yaso Hami
- Bandu Gunasekara as Punchappu
- Douglas Wickremasinghe as Mudaliwuna Malwana
- Thilakasiri Fernando as Cart driver
- Shanthi Lekha as Executed man's wife
- N. R. Dias as Torturer
- Chris Greet as Portuguese soldier
- Jeevarani Kurukulasuriya as Executed man's daughter
- Reg Van Culenberg as Portuguese soldier
- Tissa Udangamuwa as Portuguese soldier
- Anthony C. Perera as Town crier
- Risien Bartholomeusz as Portuguese Catholic priest

== Music ==
The music in the film was composed by Sunil Santha, a pioneer in Sinhala music. Jothipala's Puruthugeesikaraya was a hit.also, Ko Hathuro musical track was also a hit. The lyrics were composed by Arisen Ahubudu.
