= Dheewarayo =

1964 Sri Lankan film

- Directed by: M. Masthan
- Screenplay by: Hugo Fernando
- Produced by: K. Gunaratnam
- Starring: Gamini Fonseka; Sandhya Kumari; Vijitha Mallika; Hugo Fernando
- Cinematography: Willie Blake
- Edited by: Titus Thotawatte
- Music by: M. K. Rocksamy
- Release date: April 10, 1964 (Sri Lanka)
- Country: Sri Lanka
- Language: Sinhala

Dheewarayo (Sinhala : ධීවරයෝ) is a 1964 Sri Lankan Sinhala drama film directed by M. Masthan and produced by K. Gunaratnam. It stars Gamini Fonseka and Sandhya Kumari in lead roles with Vijitha Mallika and Hugo Fernando in supportive roles. Music for the film is done by M. K. Rocksamy.

The film became a huge blockbuster in that year and received critical acclaim at film festivals. The film was nominated for five Best Films at the 1965 Sarasaviya Awards and Gamini Fonseka, who played the lead role of Francis in the film won the award for the Best Actor.

== Cast ==
- Gamini Fonseka as Francis
- Sandhya Kumari as Rosalin
- Anthony C. Perera
- Ignatius Gunaratne as Rosalin's Thaththa
- Hugo Fernando
- B. S. Perera
- Ruby de Mel
- Christy Leonard Perera
- Vijitha Mallika
- Herbert Amarawickrama
- M. V. Balan
- Kumari Perera

== Songs ==
- "Sathuta Soke" – Latha Walpola
- "Samaye Samagiye Pathurala" – Mohideen Baig, Mallika Kahawita, Christy Leonard Perera and chorus
- "Nilata Nile Wihide Yayi" – Latha and Dharmadasa Walpola
- "Awilla Awilla" – Latha Walpola, Mohideen Baig, Christy Leonard Perera and chorus
- "Walle Sibina Ralle" – Mohideen Baig, Mallika Kahawita, Christy Leonard Perera and chorus
- "Agada Sagaraye" –J. A. Milton Perera
- "Ra Bowi Bowi Yayi" – J. A. Milton Perera, Haroon Lanthra and Noel Guneratne
- "Maligawe Ma Rajina" – Sujatha Perera
