= Florida Jayalath =

Sri Lankan actress, filmmaker and choreographer

Florida Jayalath ෆ්ලොරිඩා ජයලත්
- Born: Jayathilake Arachchige Florida Cooray; 1936; Marawila, Sri Lanka
- Died: April 2007 (aged 71); Melbourne, Australia
- Education: Holy Family Convent, Marawila
- Occupations: Actress, Director, Choreographer, Producer
- Years active: 1951–1966
- Parents: D. K. Jayalath (father); Merry Gald Jayalath (mother)

Jayathilake Arachchige Florida Cooray (1936–2007 as ෆ්ලොරිඩා ජයලත්) [Sinhala]), popularly known as Florida Jayalath, was an actress in Sri Lankan cinema. Apart from acting, Florida also worked as a filmmaker, choreographer and a film producer. She is the first female filmmaker in Sinhala film industry.

== Personal life ==
Florida was born in 1936 in Marawila as the fourth child of the family. Her father was D. K. Jayalath and mother was Merry Gald Jayalath. She completed education from Holy Family Convent, Marawila. She has two elder sisters, Josapin Jayalath and Srima Murial Jayalath. Josapin was a dramatist at the Minerva Drama Team.

Florida died in April 2007 at the age of 71. At the time of demise, she was in Melbourne, Australia with her daughter.

== Career ==
Florida made her film debut with a minor role in the 1951 film Segawunu Pilithura. Then in 1953, she made a major role in the film Sujatha with the titular character. The film was a blockbuster of that year and Florida became a sensation among the people. She appeared in many popular movies in the coming years such as Sada Sulang, Daruwa Kageda and Heta Pramada Wadi. In the film Seda Sulang, Indian playback singer Lata Mangeshkar played the background song Sri Lanka Ma Priyadara for Florida. Her last film appearance came through 1966 film Sudu Duwa.

In 1965, she directed and produced the film Sweep Ticket along with Raja Joshua. This is the first time a woman in Sinhala cinema has directed a feature film.

== Filmography ==
Year	Film	Role	Ref.
1951	Segawunu Pilithura	Stage dancer	
1952	Umathu Wishwasaya	Dancer	
1953	Sujatha	Sujatha	
1955	Seda Sulang	Seetha	
1957	Saradama	Sandhya / Kama	
1958	Sepali	Sepali	
1959	Awishwasaya	Latha	
1959	Gehenu Geta	Dancer	
1960	Pirimiyek Nisa		
1961	Suwineetha Lalani		
1961	Daruwa Kageda..?	Geetha	
1962	Deva Sundari		
1963	Wena Swargayak Kumatada..?		
1963	Sudu Sande Kalu Wala	Manike	
1963	Mangalika		
1964	Heta Pramada Wadi	Laxmi	
1965	Sweep Ticket		
1966	Sudu Duwa		
