= M. K. Rocksamy =

Sri Lankan music director

M. K. Rocksamy එම්. කේ. රොක්සාමි
- Born: Maria Kolande Rock Christysamy; 13 September 1932; Elpitiya, Sri Lanka
- Died: 30 November 1988 (aged 56); Colombo, Sri Lanka
- Other name: Rock
- Education: Anderson College, Slave Island
- Occupations: Actor; composer
- Spouse: Indrani Rocksamy
- Children: 3
- Musical career
- Genres: Pop; soul; rhythm and blues; Indian classical music
- Instruments: tabla, saxophone, Violin, Piano
- Years active: 1949–1988

Maria Kolande Rock Christysamy (13 September 1932 – 30 November 1988), popularly known as M. K. Rocksamy, was a Sri Lankan musician and music director.

== Personal life ==
Rocksamy was born on 13 September 1932 in Elpitiya to a musical family that came from Goa, India. His father was Maria Kolande Samy and mother was Anna Mary Moses. Both father and mother were born in Pondicherry Colony, South India. Rocksamy was the second child of the second marriage of Anna Mary. Anna Mary was previously married to a person called Lazarus. Anna had three children from this first marriage – Nazareth, Rose Lazarus and Joe Lazarus. After the marriage with Kolandesamy, she gave birth to three more children – Anthony Sami, Christysamy and Bastian Sami. Therefore, Rocksamy's race was Tamil, his mother tongue was Tamil, and his religion was Roman Catholic.

He initially learned to play the tabla and the saxophone. His mother was a harmonium player. He completed his education from Anderson College, Slave Island. He was also a soccer player for the college football team and a colour holder of the school.

His brother Anthonysamy is also a musician.

He was married to Indrani Rocksamy. He met Indrani during the song production of film Sekaya, where she was one of the chorus singers. The couple has three children – Jeevan Augustin, Anna Radika and Anjala Devika. His son Jeevan used to play keyboards, guitar and drums. Rocksamy was a devoted Catholic and often visited St. Anthony's church, Wahakotte. He died on 30 November 1988 at the age of 56.

== Music career ==
Rocksamy joined the Radio Ceylon orchestra at the age of 17. He continued to play the violin for eight hours per day. Therefore he became the most sought after violinist during that time.

Rocksamy is credited with introducing the saxophone to the Sinhala Oriental Music Orchestra of Radio Ceylon. He turned his attention to the violin after taking lessons on Carnatic music under teacher Sangaralingam at Colpetty. He joined Radio Ceylon as a violinist in 1953 and participated in several of R. A. Chandrasena's programs. His first recording with the organization is said to be a guitar part on a Susil Premaratne song. He played music for many live musical programs on ITN and also on Rupavahini.

Then under the guidance of Chandrasena, Rocksamy moved to Ramayya Muttusamy to learn the music further. He joined with Muttusamy’s film orchestra at the Sundera Murugan Nayagam Studio at Kandana in the late 1950s. He continued to work in Sinhala cinema from the 1960s to the mid 1980s. Rocksamy was asked to contribute to the soundtrack of several films made at the studio beginning with Bandara Nagarayata Pemineema (1952). In 1962, he got the opportunity to play a bigger role directing three songs for Shanthi Kumar's Sansare after its original music director B. S. Perera died. His song Sinhala Avurudda Ewilla became highly popularized and still a sensation during Avurudu festival. Some of his most popular song composing include Jeewana Vila Meda, Piyaapath Sala, Madu Mala Lesa, Agaada Saagaraye, Menikak Rakina, Budu Saamine and Sithin Ma Noseli Sitiddi. He worked continuously in large number of music studios such as The Vijaya Studio Wattala, the Government Film Unit, Narahenpita, Ceylon Studios, Thimbirigasyaya, SPM Studios Kandana and Sarasavi Studios Kelaniya.

He has directed music for more than 60 Sinhala films such as Sansaare, Dheewarayo, Chandali, Maha Re Hamuwu Striya, Hara Lakshaya, Deviyani Oba Kohida and Re Manamali. He also composed music for three Tamil films including Ponmani. He is the composer of the first independent Hindi song included in a Sinhalese Film. The song Ek Kali Thi was written by Ravilal Wimaladharma for the film Cyril Malli and sung by Milton Mallawarachchi. The Sinhala translation of the song Mal Kekuli Komali Manali was sung by H.R. Jothipala and composer was Rocksamy.
