= Ataweni Pudumaya =

Ataweni Pudumaya අටවෙනි පුදුමය
- Directed by: M. Masthan
- Written by: M. Masthan
- Produced by: K. Gunaratnam
- Starring: Joe Abeywickrama; Sandhya Kumari; Clarice de Silva; Senadheera Rupasinghe
- Cinematography: V. Vamadevan
- Edited by: W. D. K. Reuban
- Music by: R. Muttusamy
- Release date: 21 December 1968
- Country: Sri Lanka
- Language: Sinhala

Ataweni Pudumaya is a 1968 Sri Lankan film directed by S. Mastan and produced by K. Gunaratnam. The film stars Joe Abeywickrama and Sandhya Kumari in lead roles whereas Clarice de Silva, Senadheera Rupasinghe and Thalatha Gunasekara made supportive roles. Music was directed by R. Muttusamy.

== Cast ==
- Joe Abeywickrama
- Sandhya Kumari
- Clarice de Silva
- Senadheera Rupasinghe
- Thalatha Gunasekara
- D. R. Nanayakkara
- Shanthi Lekha
- Hugo Fernando
- Anthony C. Perera
- Christy Leonard Perera
- Don Sirisena
- M. V. Balan
- B. S. Perera
- Alexander Fernando
- Lilian Edirisinghe
- Richard Albert
- Roy Handapangoda
- Sunil Premadasa
