= 1st Sarasaviya Awards =

1964 awards festival for Sinhala cinema

- Date: May 9, 1964
- Site: Asoka Cinema, Colombo, Sri Lanka
- Directed by: Granville Silva

Highlights
- Best Picture: Gamperaliya
- Most awards: Gamperaliya (9)
- Most nominations: Gamperaliya

Television coverage
- Network: Associated Newspapers of Ceylon Limited

The 1st Sarasaviya Awards festival (Sinhala: 1වැනි සරසවිය සම්මාන උලෙළ), presented by the Associated Newspapers of Ceylon Limited, was held to honor the best films of 1961, 1962 and 1963 in Sinhala cinema on May 9, 1964, at the Asoka Cinema, Colombo, Sri Lanka. Senate President Thomas Amarasuriya was the chief guest at the awards night.

The film Gamperaliya won the most awards with nine including Best Film.

== Awards ==
Category	Film	Recipient
Best Film	Gamperaliya	Anton Wickremasinghe
Best Director	Gamperaliya	Lester James Peries
Best Actor	Sikuru Tharuwa	D. R. Nanayakkara
Best Actress	Gamperaliya	Punya Heendeniya
Best Script Writer	Gamperaliya	Regi Siriwardena
Best Cinematographer	Gamperaliya	William Blake
Best Editor	Gamperaliya	Sumitra Peries
Best Music Direction	Gamperaliya	W. D. Amaradeva
Best Lyricist	Ranmuthu Duwa	Chandraratne Manawasinghe
Best Male Playback Singer	Ranmuthu Duwa	Narada Disasekara
Best Female Playback Singer	Ranmuthu Duwa	Nanda Malini
Honorary Awards	Gamperaliya	Gamini Fonseka
Honorary Awards	Gamperaliya	Punya Heendeniya
Honorary Awards	Sikuru Tharuwa	John Amaratunga

Category	Film	No. of votes
Popular Awards from Reader Vote	Gamperaliya	35,374 votes
Popular Awards from Reader Vote	Sikuru Tharuwa	34,921 votes
Popular Awards from Reader Vote	Ranmuthu Duwa	32,843 votes
Popular Awards from Reader Vote	Suhada Sohoyuro	27,014 votes
Popular Awards from Reader Vote	Suvineetha Lalani	24,712 votes
Popular Awards from Reader Vote	Sandesaya	24,689 votes
Popular Awards from Reader Vote	Kurulu Bedda	24,576 votes
