= P. K. D. Seneviratne =

Sri Lankan scriptwriter and poet (1917–1970)

- පී. කේ. ඩී. සෙනෙවිරත්න
- Born: Pathirajawasam Kudahitige Don Seneviratne; 17 May 1917; Gampaha, British Ceylon
- Died: 19 June 1970 (aged 53); Gampaha, Sri Lanka
- Other name: PKD
- Education: Ellakkala Boys School; Kumbaloluwa Boys School
- Occupations: Poet, writer, scriptwriter, playwright, journalist
- Years active: 1937–1970
- Awards: Best Screenplay

Pathirajawasam Kudahitige Don Seneviratne (17 May 1917 – 19 July 1970 Sinhala: පී. කේ. ඩී. සෙනෙවිරත්න) was a prominent Sri Lankan poet, journalist and scriptwriter for Sinhala cinema. Seneviratne wrote several popular films, such as Kurulu Bedda, Sikuru Tharuwa, Parasathu Mal and Ran Salu. He was a popular poet of the Colombo period.

== Personal life ==
Seneviratne was born on 17 May 1917 in Hakgalla Ellakkala village in Attanagalla, Gampaha, Sri Lanka, to parents P.K.D Mohotti Appuhamy and Sedanona Athurugiri Hamine. He was educated at Ellakkala Boys School and Kumbaloluwa Boys School. He had one younger brother, Dr. P. K. Gunathilake. His son was Lieutenant Commander Dr. Ishantha Gunathilaka, both are doctors by profession.

He died on 19 July 1970 at the age of 53.

== Career ==
In 1937, at the age of 18, Seneviratne began writing poetry for Silumina newspaper's poetry page. In 1939 and 1956, he wrote poems on North-Eastern Sinhala Buddhist heritage. He later published poetry collections such as Attanagallu Nadi Kavyaya, Ditta Mangalika, Gambada Sundari, Unmada Chithra and Ganga Kumariya. Then he translated the popular novel 'Withering Heights' into Sinhala under the title 'Urumakkarayo' with Ranjani Abeywardena. He had a close relationship with other poets of his era, including Sri Chandraratne Manawasinghe, S. A. James, Dharmadasa Kuruppu, Chithra Balasuriya, Mahagama Sekera, Meemana Premathilake and Wimalasiri Perera. From 1953 to 1957 he wrote the popular radio drama Kurulu Bedda which was aired on the Sinhala section of Radio Ceylon. The drama later in 1961 became a blockbuster film directed by L. S. Ramachandran. The film was presented with Russian and English subtitles at the 1961 Soviet Film Festival in Moscow.

The film Sikuru Tharuwa was his second film screenplay which he wrote in 1963. In the film, he made characters based on real incidents and persons he met. The film later won second place at the first Sinhala Film Festival in 1964. It also received two Sarasaviya awards and two Sarasaviya merit awards at the event. The Sarasaviya newspaper was named after by Seneviratne. The first Sarasaviya newspaper was published on April 10, 1963. The chief editor of the paper was his friend Meemana Premathilaka. Then he also wrote articles about his poems as well as his love of literature to 'Sarasaviya'. He wrote the story of the film Parasatu Mal in weekly serial for the 'Sarasaviya' newspaper for several weeks. In the article Pabandu Kariya written for the 1964 'Sarasaviya' annual, he described his radio dramas.

He started his teaching career as a senior assistant teacher at the Morawaka Buddhist Mixed School and Gaspe College in Nelumdeniya. Later he wrote the script of the popular film Ranwan Karal directed by Prof. Siri Gunasinghe with a narrative style screenplay. Along with Meemana Premathilaka, he wrote the Kumudumathi Poetry Conversation. Based on the information provided during the period when problems arose in translating the Sinhala language into the English language since the independence of Sri Lanka. PKKD wrote the poem "Ditta Mangalika" which consisting of 298 poems. On 26 November 1966, his emotional poetry titled Mage Kshema Bhoomiya was published in the Silumina newspaper. Based on a true story he had to experience, he wrote the poetry, Ae Kohida?. Along with H. M. Kudaligama he made conversational poems of Daskon Vaadaya.

In 1966, he wrote the script for the film Parasathu Mal directed by Gamini Fonseka. The film received critics acclaim and PKD later won the Award for Best Screenwriter at the 1967 Sarasaviya Awards. The film was earlier titled as 'Pemwathunge Lokaya', but he did not like the name. In 1967, he wrote the screenplay for the film Ran Salu directed by Lester James Peries. The film won many awards and accolades at both local and international film festivals. On 18 October 1967, Varayet Magazine in the United States of America highlighted that the dialogue and direction of the Ran Salu film was of a very high standard. At the Fifth Film Festival organized by the Sarasaviya and Janatha Newspapers in 1968, 'Ran Salu' won three Sarasaviya Awards and two Sarasaviya Special Awards. At the 1968 Critics' Awards, Ran Salu also won three Critics' Awards. The film has also been highly praised and honored by Dr. Roger Manwell, a well-known international film critic. According to Noel Cruz, an international film critic for Weekly End Sun, Ran Salu was the first real-life Buddhist film to be made into an international cinema.

His screenplay was published in the Sarasaviya newspaper under the title Unmada Chithra from May 19, 1968 to July 28, 1968. Meanwhile, from 1968 to 1970, Seneviratne was the Information Secretary of Dudley Senanayake, who was the Prime Minister of Sri Lanka at the time. He later wrote radio dramas such as Henyaya and Nildiyalanda. His last poem wrote and published in 'Sarasaviya' was Muhudata Muhunala. However, he has died before publishing the poem. The last film in which he wrote the screenplay, Priyanga directed by Amaranath Jayathilake, was released in September 1970 after his death. His poems were also published in the magazines such as Navayugaya, Meevadaya, Suwanda and Dedunna. The two screenplays written by PKD Hith Nathi Mal and Kshema Bhoomiya have not been released yet.

== Filmography ==
Year	Film	Roles	Ref.
1961	Kurulu Bedda	Source Author, Screenwriter, Lyricist	
1963	Sikuru Tharuwa	Screenwriter	
1966	Parasathu Mal	Screenwriter	
1967	Ran Salu	Screenwriter	
1968	Adarawanthayo	Lyricist	
1970	Priyanga	Screenwriter	
