= Sujatha Paramanathan =

Sri Lankan actress, beauty queen and former politician

Sujatha Paramanathan සුජාතා පරමනාදන්
- Born: Sujatha Chandradasa; 13 November 1937 (age 88); Matale, Sri Lanka
- Resting place: \
- Education: St. Agnes Convent, Matale
- Occupations: Actress, model, beauty queen, politician
- Years active: 1975–present
- Spouse: Bernard Paramanathan (m. 1954)
- Children: 9

Sujatha Chandradasa Paramanathan (born 13 November 1937 as Sinhala: සුජාතා පරමනාදන්), is a former beauty queen and actress in Sri Lankan cinema, theater and television. She is the first Sri Lankan actress turned politician, where she won the Yatawatta Gam Sabha council from Matale district in 1960.

== Personal life ==
She was born on 13 November 1937 in Hulangamuwa Walawwa, Matale, Sri Lanka. Her father worked in the Department of Education. She completed education from St. Agnes Convent, Matale (currently known as St. Thomas' Girls College).

At the age of 16, Sujatha married Bernard Paramanathan. The couple has six sons and three daughters. In 1980, her husband Bernard died of a heart attack.

== Career ==
After the marriage, she contested for many beauty pageants. In 1955, Sujatha reached the finals of the Times beauty pageant. Then in 1956, she won the third place in Lankadeep Pancha Kalyani competition. In 1957, she competed in the finals of the Observer Miss Lanka pageant. In 1961, she finished third in the Bell of the Year competition. Later she won first place in the 1985 Charming Grandmother competition.

When she was a schoolgirl, she got the opportunity to meet the actress Rukmani Devi and director B. A. W. Jayamanne. Rukmani joined Sujatha to the movie Daivayogaya to play the role as Rukmani's younger sister. However, the film was delayed and she missed the opportunity. Meanwhile, she met two singers Mohideen Baig and P. L. A. Somapala and invited to play the main character of the film Asoka. But before that, another relative of Sujatha introduced her to K. Gunaratnam, owner of Cinemas film production company. Through Gunaratnam, she got the opportunity to act as Rita Ratnayake's friend in the film Warada Kageda directed by T. R. Sundaram and A. R. Rao.

Then she played the role of 'Kundalakeshi' in Karunadevi Siriwardena's stage play Kundalakeshi. After that, she was invited to act in 1966 film Delovak Athara and then in 1967 film Ran Salu, both directed by Lester James Peries. Her first teledrama was Sandungira Giniganiyi directed by H. D. Premaratne. She then starred in 24 more teledramas. After the death of Rukmani, Sujatha was chosen to play the role of 'Sivamma' in the stage play Sivamma Dhanapala.However, after few appearances, she refused to take the role. In 1968, she was selected for the lead role in the film Punchi Baba directed by Tissa Liyanasuriya. However she lost the role, as producer Sugathadasa Marasinghe wanted to cast Malini Fonseka in the lead role. Finally she decided to join for a minor role in the film.

In 1960 at the age of 22, Sujatha contested the village council election from the Sri Lanka Freedom Party for the Muruthawatta division of the Yatawatta village council in the Matale district. She won the election becoming the youngest Gam Sabha member in Sri Lanka as well as the first actress to win a popular vote in an election in Sri Lanka. Then she served for three years as a member of the Yatawatta Village Council. In 1997, she re-entered active politics by unsuccessfully contesting the Matale Municipal Council election from the Mahajana Eksath Peramuna.

In 2014, she acted in the teledrama Thung Man Thenna directed by Shirley P. Delankawala and then in the serial Dura Gamanak directed by Sanjaya Vithanage. Since 2000, she has appeared in several commercial advertisements. His last teledrama appearance came through Siriyalatha. In 2021, she was honored with lifetime achievement award during the ceremony held for 21 artists who made an invaluable contribution to Sinhala cinema in the early decades of Sinhala Cinema.

== Filmography ==
Year	Film	Role	Ref.
1954	Warada Kageda		
1955	Seda Sulang	Eddie's wife	
1966	Delovak Athara	Drama performer	
1967	Ran Salu	Cyril's lover	
1968	Punchi Baba		
1982	Chathu Madura	Pre-test pep talk giver	
1982	Pradeepa		
1994	Yuwathipathi	Sheela's mother	
1996	Loku Duwa		
1998	Anthima Reya		
1998	Julietge Bhumikawa	Amma	
