= Aseka Wijewardena =

Sri Lankan dancer

- අසේකා විජේවර්ධන
- Born: November 21, 1992 (age 33); Colombo, Western Province, Sri Lanka
- Education: Ladies' College, Colombo
- Occupations: Dancer; model
- Years active: 2005 – present
- Parents: Channa Udayaprem Wijewardena (father); Upuli née Algama (mother)
- Family: Sithratchcharige Panis Algama (S. Panibharatha) (maternal grandfather)

Aseka Wijewardena (Sinhala: අසේකා විජේවර්ධන) (Pronunciation: asēkā vijēvardhana) (born 21 November 1992) is a Sinhala classical dancer. Wijewardena is the granddaughter of dancer S. Panibharatha. (Note: "Aseka Wijewardena biography, Which posted on Sunday observer")

== Personal life ==
Aseka Wijewardena was born on 21 November 1992 into a family of traditional Sinhalese dancers. Her parents are Channa Udayaprem Wijewardena and Upuli née Algama, and her maternal grandfather was S. Panibharatha, a pioneer of Sinhala classical dance. She studied at Ladies' College, Colombo and completed her advanced level examination in dance.

== Career ==
Wijewardena started learning traditional Sri Lankan dancing at eight years of age, and also acting on stage. She studied Western classical ballet under Deanna Jayasuriya – a Grande dame of ballet in Sri Lanka. Wijewardena is also a choreographer and has choreographed numerous dance routines. She focuses on beauty and femininity in her postures, expressions and movements. She loves the Indian dances, especially the Odyssey as they are feminine and fluid. She also likes the Thai dances and admires their costumes.

Aseka has performed at venues including the Sydney Opera House, Kennedy Center in Washington and the Miller Theatre in Houston. Wijewardena stated that she believes that people should move with the times. She encourages Fusion Dance in a blend of the Orient and the Occident, and of the old and the new.

Wijewardena is currently working as a dancer in her parents' dancing school, Channa Upuli Dance Academy, which commenced in the 1980s. (Note: "Aseka Wijewardena dance for Umariya Sinhawansa song, The article was published on Hiru TV website")
