= Ran Salu =

- Punya Heendeniya in a sequence from the film
- Directed by: Lester James Peries
- Written by: P. K. D. Seneviratne
- Produced by: Upasena Marasinghe; L. M. Simon
- Starring: Tony Ranasinghe; Punya Heendeniya; Anula Karunathilaka
- Cinematography: Sumitta Amerasinghe
- Edited by: Sumitra Gunawardana
- Music by: W.D. Amaradeva
- Distributed by: Chameekara Films
- Release date: 30 April 1967
- Running time: 106 minutes
- Country: Sri Lanka
- Language: Sinhala
- Budget: Approx. 200,000 rupees

Ran Salu (In Sinhala: The Yellow Robe) is a 1967 Sri Lankan drama film directed by Lester James Peries. The film follows the parallel paths of Sujatha (Punya Heendeniya) and Sarojini Perera (Anula Karunathilaka).

P. K. D. Seneviratne wrote the screenplay dealing with Buddhism. It was the second most successful of Peries' first seven films behind Sandesaya. Despite the popularity, Philip Cooray found the film overly emotional and too plotted. It however won a Gandhi Award at Delhi in 1969 and was bought for Irish TV.

== Plot ==
Cyril (Tony Ranasinghe) is dissatisfied with his introverted fiancée Sujatha (Punya Heendeniya). He starts a relationship with the outgoing Sarojini (Anula Karunatilleke) and gets her pregnant. Sujatha meanwhile is fascinated by a wandering Buddhist nun.

Due to the pregnancy, Cyril breaks off the engagement having no intention to marry Sarojini. Till the birth of the child he supports her and then leaves her for an older rich woman. Sarojini is distraught and contemplates suicide. Sujatha by this time is planning to become a nun.

Sujatha takes in Sarojini. By the conclusion, they have switched roles with Sarojini becoming a nun and Sujatha becoming infatuated with a young man.

== Cast ==
- Punya Heendeniya as Sujatha 'Suji' Ratnasooriya
- Tony Ranasinghe as Cyril Elkaduwawa
- Anula Karunathilaka as Sarojini 'Sara'
- Iranganie Serasinghe as Rohini Ratnasooriya 'Amma'
- Dayananda Gunawardena as Senaka Ranatunga
- J. B. L. Gunasekera as Mr. Ratnasooriya 'Thaththa'
- Sobashini Atukorale as Dasasil Mata
- S. A. Jamis as Nonis
- Shanthi Lekha as Sarojini's Amma
- Kithsiri Perera as Sarojini's brother
- D. R. Nanayakkara as Eliyas
- Sujatha Paramanathan as Cyril's lover
- A. P. Gunaratne as Senaka's Thaththa 'Mr. Jayatunga'
- Somi Meegama as Senaka's Amma 'Mrs. Jayatunga'
