= Delovak Athara =

දෙලොවක් අතර (Delovak Athara)
- Tony Ranasinghe and Suwineetha Weeeasinghe in a sequence from the film
- Directed by: Lester James Peries
- Written by: Lester James Peries; Reggie Siriwardene; Gamini Gunawardena; Tissa Abeysekera
- Produced by: Anton Wickremasinghe
- Starring: Tony Ranasinghe; Suvineetha Weerasinghe; Jeevarani Kurukulasuriya; Iranganie Serasinghe
- Cinematography: William Blake
- Edited by: Sumitra Gunawardana
- Music by: W.D. Amaradeva
- Distributed by: Cinelanka Ltd.
- Release date: 1966
- Running time: 103 minutes
- Country: Sri Lanka
- Language: Sinhala
- Budget: 200,000 rupees

Delovak Athara (English: Between Two Worlds) is a 1966 Sri Lankan drama film directed by Dr. Lester James Peries, with screenplay, dialogue, and script by Dr. Tissa Abeysekara. The film stars Tony Ranasinghe and Suvineetha Weerasinghe in lead roles, along with Jeevarani Kurukulasuriya and Wijeratne Warakagoda.

Peries developed the movie as a character study, utilizing a single incident to provide insight into the newly rich society of Sri Lanka in the time period. It proved to be his most successful film up to that time, surpassing Gamperaliya in box office earnings. It was also a critical success, winning praise from Sinhala critics like Philip Cooray and making the rounds at European film festivals, including the Valladolid Film Festival in Spain.

The film was re-screened on 21 July 2018 at the Regal Cinema in Kandy for the Sarasaviya Film Festival.

== Plot ==
Nissanka is engaged to Shiranee, a woman of his own social class. Nissanka decides to go to a club and asks Shiranee, who politely declines. He goes alone and meets an old friend, Chitra. They rekindle their friendship, and Nissanka offers her a ride home. Chitra agrees and they set off, only to accidentally hit and kill a pedestrian.

The two flee the scene. Nissanka's family subsequently attempts to cover up the death. Chitra is faced with a moral dilemma, but does not give Nissanka up to the police. She urges him to turn himself in. One man who had seen the accident, tells the police the numbers on the car's license plate. The police inquire into this and question Nissanka. Nissanka's father tells the police that his servant drove the car, and the servant is also questioned by the police. One day the servant learns that the pedestrian has died, so he runs away to his village. The policemen go to his village and arrest him. Meanwhile, mounting tensions and conflicts exacerbate the already tense situation, making Nissanka's life unbearable. He finally decides to go to the police with Chitra and confess.

== Cast ==
- Tony Ranasinghe as Nissanka Wijesinghe
- Suvineetha Weerasinghe as Chitra Karunaratne
- Jeevarani Kurukulasuriya as Shiranee Gunasekara
- Iranganie Serasinghe as Clara Wijesinghe, Nissanka's mother
- J. B. L. Gunasekera as Herbert Wijesinghe, Nissanka's father
- Winston Serasinghe as Francis Gunasekara, Shiranee's father
- Somapala Dharmapriya as Martin
- Sujatha Jayawardena as Mrs. Gunasekara, Shiranee's mother
- Wijeratne Warakagoda as Police Inspector
- Kithsiri Perera as Asoka
- Nawanandana Wijesinghe as Drunk witness
- Thilakasiri Fernando as Andiris 'Appu'
- Sunila Abeysekera as Chitra's niece
- Premini Gunaratne as Chitra's sister
- G. W. Surendra as Office newspaper reader
- Shirani Gunathilaka as Drama performer
- Sujatha Paramanathan as Drama performer
- Shirani Kurukulasuriya as Drama performer
- Lillian de Abrew as Drama performer
- Shanthi Lekha as Accident victim's Amma
- Asoka Peiris as Factory walker
- Wickrama Bogoda
- Tissa Abeysekara
- Bernard Ranasinghe
- Elson Divithuragama
