= J. A. Milton Perera =

Sri Lankan musician (1938–1991)

J. A. Milton Perera ජේ. ඒ. මිල්ටන් පෙරේරා
- Born: Jayasinghe Arachchige Milton Perera; 5 May 1938; Colombo, Sri Lanka
- Died: 24 October 1991 (aged 53); Colombo, Sri Lanka
- Occupations: Singer, composer
- Spouses: Mala Hemalatha, Kalyani Perera (m. 1969)
- Relatives: Dilhani Ekanayake (daughter-in-law)
- Musical career
- Genres: Pop; soul; Classical music; Hindustani music
- Instruments: Vocals, harmonium, tabla
- Years active: 1961–1990
- Labels: HMV; Columbia; Vijitha

Jayasinghe Arachchige Milton Perera (Sinhala: මිල්ටන් පෙරේරා; 5 May 1938 – 24 October 1991), popularly known as Milton Perera, was a singer, composer and playback singer of Sri Lankan cinema. One of the most respected artists in Sri Lanka, Milton Perera rendered his voice to diverse array of artists as a playback singer for many films in a career spanned for more than three decades. He was the leading playback singer of Sri Lankan cinema during the 1960s and 1970s.

== Personal life ==
Milton was born on May 5, 1938, the son of J. A. Edwin Perera, also known as Tabla Podi Appuhamy, an accomplished tabla player. His mother was Prema Wickramarachchi. Inspired by his father, Milton became proficient on the Tabla at a young age. Perera was a skinny, innocent young man of Podi Appuhamy. They lived in Sangamitta Mawata, Kotahena, known as Green Street. His father was a proud owner of series of small houses in a land along the street. Father and Milton lived in one of those houses. All other houses were rented. The first house of Podi Appuhamay was rented and that man had a beautiful daughter, named Hemalatha. She was so beautiful, sexy looking, and studied at the nearby school at the Green Street, known as Kotahena Madhya Maha Vidyalaya.

Milton has been trying to express his love to Mala Hemalatha. She was popularly known as Mala. He sent love letters to Mala through other students at the Schools and they were in love in no time. So Milton sang, 'Aranna Adare Mala', dedicated to his girl friend. They married and had Priyankara as only child. Later, Milton left Mala for Kalyani.

Milton was later married to Kalyani Perera, who had been an actress. Their wedding was celebrated on 26 September 1969. They had three sons: Chalaka Chamupathi, Arosha Asanga and Pamoda Piyushan. Milton died on October 24, 1991. In memory of Milton, Priyankara Perera and Chalaka Chamupathi Perera continue to perform J.A Milton Perera's songs.

Eldest son Priyankara Perera is married to renowned actress Dilhani Ekanayake and they have one son Dilmin Perera. His second son Chalaka Chamupathi Perera is married to Padmi Ranasinghe, and they have one daughter Anjana Dasuni Perera and one son Chamath Chamupathi Perera.

== Musical career ==
Popular singer H. R. Jothipala introduced Milton to Sripali Wayman to the Velenda Sewaya of Radio Ceylon. In 1940, Milton sang his first song for Radio Ceylon, "Alehi Bendi Jeewitha". It was written by Aloy Gunawardena around a Mohamed Sally melody. However, his father died five days before the song was aired. He subsequently had several popular songs on the radio, "Podi Kale Api Denna," "Oba Wewa Wewa Pahana Mage", "Sikuru liya Komala liya" and "Kalyaniye." Milton was very close with Alloy Gunawardene, Jothipala and Karunaratne Abeysekera. Milton along with Jothipala sang 'Song Debate' which became known as 'Ananga Wadaya' in the music world with the help of Karunaratne Abeysekera and Gunaratne Abeysekera.

At the age of 14, when Raj Kapoor, Nargis Thalada and a group of actors came to Sri Lanka in 1954, he got to play the Tabla for their dancing and singing by Thalad Mohammad. He also played Dholak at special festivals. Milton rose to prominence as a film playback singer in the 1960s. Milton debut to playback singing came with a song on Kurulu Bedda (1961). In his 30-year career in the field, he provided his voice to actors like Gamini Fonseka, Joe Abeywickrama, Tony Ranasinghe, Vijaya Kumaratunga, Ananda Jayaratne, D. R. Nanayakkara, Anthony C. Perera and Stanley Perera in such films as Adata Wediya Heta Hondai, Dheewarayo, Yatagiya Dawasa, Allapu Gedara, Bicycle Hora, Daru Duka, Sarawita, Ataweni Pudumaya, Chandiya and Deiyange Theenduwa. Milton won Award for the Best Singer at the 1966 Sarasavi Awards and was named the Most Popular Singer of the Year at the Golden Sankha Awards sponsored by Vogue Jewelers the same year.

The Sinhala Baila song Pissu Vikare (Dagena Polkatu Male) by H. R. Jothipala, Milton Perera, M. S. Fernando is a cover version of the Tamil song Dingiri Dingale (Meenachi) from the 1958 Tamil film Anbu Engey. And it was covered again in Sinhala as a folk song named Digisi/Digiri Digare (Kussiye Badu).

== Filmography ==
Year	Film	Roles	Ref.
1961	Kurulu Bedda	Playback singer	
1963	Adata Wadiya Heta Hondai	Playback singer	
1963	Sikuru Tharuwa	Playback singer	
1964	Dheewarayo	Playback singer	
1964	Samaje Api Okkoma Samanai	Playback singer	
1964	Sujage Rahasa	Playback singer	
1965	Sepatha Soya	Playback singer	
1965	Handapana	Playback singer	
1965	Chandiya	Playback singer	
1965	Sudo Sudu	Playback singer	
1965	Yatagiya Dawasa	Playback singer	
1965	Saaravita	Playback singer	
1965	Hathra Maha Nidhanaya	Playback singer	
1965	Hithata Hitha	Playback singer	
1965	Allapu Gedara	Playback singer	
1965	Satha Panaha	Playback singer	
1965	Sekaya	Playback singer	
1966	Senasuma Kothanada	Playback singer	
1966	Seethala Wathura	Playback singer	
1966	Sihina Hathak	Playback singer	
1966	Seyawak Pasupasa	Playback singer	
1967	Hathara Kendare	Playback singer	
1967	Daru Duka	Playback singer	
1967	Magul Poruwa	Playback singer	
1967	Saru Bima	Playback singer	
1967	Vasanthi	Playback singer	
1967	Iwasana Danaa	Playback singer	
1967	Rena Giraw	Playback singer	
1967	Okkoma Hari	Playback singer	
1968	Pini Bindu	Playback singer	
1968	Singithi Surathal	Playback singer	
1968	Sudusu Daa	Playback singer	
1968	London Hamu	Playback singer	
1968	Mathru Bhoomi	Playback singer	
1968	Bicycle Hora	Playback singer	
1968	Amathikama	Playback singer	
1968	Hangi Hora	Playback singer	
1968	Ataweni Pudumaya	Playback singer	
1969	Oba Nathinam	Playback singer	
1969	Hathara Peraliya	Playback singer	
1969	Baduth Ekka Horu	Playback singer	
1969	Binaramalee	Playback singer	
1969	Pancha	Playback singer	
1970	Dan Mathakada	Playback singer	
1970	Thevetha	Playback singer	
1970	Ohoma Hondada	Playback singer	
1970	Suli Sulang	Playback singer	
1971	Kathuru Muwath	Playback singer	
1971	Kesara Sinhayo	Playback singer	
1972	Miringuwa	Playback singer	
1973	Hathdinnath Tharu	Playback singer	
1974	Hadawath Naththo	Playback singer	
1974	Susee	Playback singer	
1974	Sahayata Danny	Playback singer	
1974	Mehema Harida	Playback singer	
1975	Kohoma Kiyannada	Playback singer	
1975	Gijulihiniyo	Playback singer	
1975	Suraya Surayamai	Playback singer	
1975	Ranwan Rekha	Playback singer	
1975	Damayanthi	Playback singer	
1975	Sikuruliya	Playback singer	
1975	Hadawathaka Wasanthaya	Playback singer	
1976	Vanarayo	Playback singer	
1976	Hariyata Hari	Playback singer	
1976	Deviyange Theenduwa	Playback singer	
1977	Hithuwakkarayo	Playback singer	
1977	Niluka	Playback singer	
1977	Chin Chin Nona	Playback singer	
1977	Yali Ipade	Playback singer	
1977	Sikuru Dasawa	Playback singer	
1977	Tom Pachaya	Playback singer	
1977	Vanagatha Kella	Playback singer	
1978	Sithaka Suwanda	Playback singer	
1978	Sri Pathula	Playback singer	
1978	Hitha Mithura	Playback singer	
1978	Selinage Walawwa	Playback singer	
1978	Kundalekeshi	Playback singer	
1979	Raja Kollo	Playback singer	
1979	Akke Mata Awasara	Playback singer	
1979	Subhani	Playback singer	
1979	Visihathara Peya	Playback singer	
1979	Hari Pudumai	Playback singer	
1980	Sasaraka Pathum	Playback singer	
1980	Mage Amma	Playback singer	
1980	Hondin Inna	Playback singer	
1981	Kolamkarayo	Playback singer	
1981	Ranga	Playback singer	
1982	Rahasak Nathi Rahasak	Playback singer	
1982	Thakkita Tharikita	Playback singer	
1983	Sandamali	Playback singer	
1983	Sumithuro	Award show viewer	
1983	Chutte	Playback singer	
1983	Chandi Siriya	Playback singer	
