= Punya Heendeniya =

Sri Lankan actress

Punya Heendeniya පුණ්‍යා හීන්දෙනිය
- Born: Heendeniya Vidanaralalage Punya Heendeniya; 31 July 1938 (age 87); Gampaha, Sri Lanka
- Education: Mirigama Central College
- Occupations: Film actor, singer, screenwriter
- Years active: 1955-1983
- Spouse: Milroy Nanayakkara
- Children: 2

Heendeniya Vidanaralalage Punya Heendeniya (born 31 July 1938: Sinhala: පුණ්‍යා හීන්දෙනිය), popularly known as Punya Heendeniya, is a former Sri Lankan cinema actress who resides in England.

== Personal life ==
Punya Heendeniya was born on 31 July 1938 in Mirigama, Sri Lanka as the fifth child in a family with seven siblings. Her father M. A. Hindeniya was a land owner and planter in Mirigama. Her mother, D. L. Kahawitage was from Panadura. She was first educated at Mirigama Primary School (currently known as Dudley Senanayake College). She went to Mirigama Maha Vidyalaya after the age of six to study in English medium. She was also a member of the school netball team. Poet P. K. D. Seneviratne is a paternal relative of Punya.

She married Milroy Nanayakkara and the couple had two children. After her marriage, she left the cinema and settled in England. Her son Anupama Nanayakkara is a specialist doctor. When Anupama was a child, he came to Sri Lanka in 1982 at the invitation of Lester James Peiris and played the role of Nanda and Piyal's son in the film Kaliyugaya. Punya's daughter, Purnami is also a doctor.

== Career ==
She learned dancing under S. Panibharatha. Punya got to play the lead role in the ballet Ditti Mangalika staged by Panibharatha at school. She also learned music under her school master, S. D. David Appuhamy. For her acting and musical talents, she was assisted by the college principal K. A. Pannaratne. Panibharatha was assigned to do a dance performance in Sirisena Wimalaweera's film Asoka where Punya had the opportunity to perform in that dance item.

She visited the office of the Heladiva Art Company, located in front of the Jethavanaramaya Temple on Armour Street, Colombo, to meet film production lawyer Somaratne, who was searching for a fresh face for the upcoming film Deyyange Rate. Impressed by her, Somaratne introduced Punya to Tamil director Ramachandran, who selected her for the lead role of Katherina in the film.

Following this debut, she acted in the films Sri 296 and Suneetha which were shot in India. In 1961, she gained widespread recognition when she played the lead role in the blockbuster film Kurulu Bedda. After the success of Kurulu Bedda, Punya starred in Sikuru Tharuwa, once again in a lead role.

John Amaratunga, the producer of the Sikuru Tharuwa selected Punya for the lead role in the film Gameperaliya directed by Lester James Peries. In 1968, she won the award for the Best Actress at 5th Sarasaviya Awards for her role in the film Ransalu. Although she gave up acting in 1968, at the peak of her career, she made comeback in the film Kaliyugaya in 1983 for which she received a merit award at Presidential Film Awards. In 2013 Sumathi Awards, she was honored with U.W. Sumathipala Memorial award.

== Filmography ==
Year	Film	Role	Ref.
1955	Asoka	dance item	
1958	Suneetha		
1958	Deyyange Rate	Katherina	
1959	Sri 296	Leela	
1961	Kurulu Bedda	Ranmenike	
1963	Sikuru Tharuwa	Anula	
1963	Gamperaliya	Nanda	
1966	Parasathu Mal	Kamala	
1967	Ran Salu	Sujatha 'Suji' Ratnasooriya	
1968	Ranwan Karal		
1983	Kaliyugaya	Nanda	

== Awards ==
- 1964- Eksath Rasika Sangamaya Best Actress Award, Gamperaliya
- 1964- Sarasaviya Film Awards- Best Actress Award, Best film, Gamperaliya
- 1964- Best Actress Proficiency Award, Sikuru Tharuwa
- 1965 Gamperaliya won "Golden Peacock Award" Grand Prix International Film Festival of India, New Delhi
- 1965 Gamperaliya won "Golden Head of Palenque", Resena Mundial Film Festival in Acapulco, Mexico
- 1965- Punya Heendeniya represented Sri Lanka on World Human Rights Day at the United Nations Headquarters in New York.
- 1966 Swarana Sankha Award, Best Actress Award, Parasathumal
- 1968- Sarasaviya Film AwardsSarasaviya Best Actress Award- Best Actress Award, Ran Salu
- 1985- Presidential Award- Kaliyugaya.
- 1998- to Celebrate 50 years of Sri Lankan Cinema a Rs10 stamp depicting Gamperaliya was issued.
- 2000-Lifetime achievement, President's Golden Lion Award
- 2008-Gamperaliya (Changement au village) shown in Cannes Film Festival as restored Classics.
- 2013-U.W.Sumathipala Lifetime Achievement Award
- 2015- Special Signis Salutation Award, -the highest award given by Signis Sri Lanka for a person who has contributed much for the development of media in Sri Lanka.
- 2016 - Sarasaviya Abhimani (Legendary) Award.
