= Ranmuthu Duwa =

Ranmuthu Duwa danuthuruwa
- Directed by: Mike Wilson
- Written by: Mike Wilson
- Produced by: Shesha Palihakkara; Mike Wilson; Arthur C. Clarke
- Starring: Gamini Fonseka; Jeevarani Kurukulasuriya
- Cinematography: Mike Wilson; M. S. Ananda
- Edited by: Titus Thotawatte
- Music by: W.D. Amaradeva
- Production company: Serendib Productions
- Distributed by: Tharanga Film and Music
- Release date: 8 October 1962
- Country: Sri Lanka
- Language: Sinhala

Ranmuthu Duwa (English: Island of Treasures) was the first colour full-length Sinhalese language film to be produced in Sri Lanka in 1962. It was co-produced by Shesha Palihakkara, Arthur C. Clarke and directed by Mike Wilson, who also made his debut as a feature director. The film stars some of those who would go on to become big names in the Sinhala Cinema, such as Gamini Fonseka, Joe Abeywickrema and Jeevarani Kurukulasuriya in the leading roles. Playback singing was by Nanda Malini, Narada Disasekara and W.D. Amaradeva. The lyrics were written by Chandraratne Manawasinghe.

Ran Muthu Duwa was a landmark in the history of the Lankan cinema, which at the time was only 15 years old (having started in 1947). It not only introduced colour to the Lankan movies, but also showed for the first time the underwater wonders of the seas around Ceylon, which had barely begun to be explored.

It was also a commercial success: seen by more than a million people on its first release during 1962-63 - a tenth of the island's then population. But the cultural influence of the film went well beyond the box office. It starred in the leading roles talented young actors who would soon become big names in Lanka's film industry, especially Gamini Fonseka and Joe Abeywickrama. It also launched or catapulted the careers of a number of other creative or technical professionals.

== Synopsis ==
The film is about the discovery of an underwater treasure. It involves a mixture of ancient legends, human treachery and romance.

== Ownership ==
In the early 1980s ownership of the film was purchased by film and record producer, Vijaya Ramanayake. Tharanga films and music currently owns and distributes the film.

== Cast ==
- Gamini Fonseka as Bandu
- Jeevarani Kurukulasuriya as Kumari
- Joe Abeywickrama as Sena
- Shane Gunaratne as Rajo
- Anthony C. Perera as Bandu's uncle
- Austin Abeysekara as Danapala
- Vincent Vaas as Kumari's father, Muttusamy
- Thilakasiri Fernando as Swami
- Eddie Amarasinghe as Sena's friend

== See also. ==
- Cinema of Sri Lanka
- Getawarayo
- W. D. Amaradeva
- Music of Sri Lanka
