= Chandiya (film) =

- Directed by: Titus Thotawatte
- Screenplay by: Titus Thotawatte (story); Karunaratne Abeysekera (screenplay)
- Produced by: K. Gunaratnam
- Starring: Gamini Fonseka, H. D. Kulatunga, Anula Karunatillake
- Music by: Karunaratne Abeysekera (lyrics); R. Muttusamy (music)
- Release date: 18 March 1965
- Country: Sri Lanka
- Language: Sinhala

Chandiya is a 1965 Sri Lankan action movie directed by Titus Thotawatte. In the country, it was the first of its genre to not borrow from Indian cinema.

== Plot ==
Troubled youth encounters the pressures of city life and villainous characters.

=== Cast ===
- Gamini Fonseka as Chuttey
- Anula Karunathilaka as Sumana
- H. D. Kulatunga as Kalu Mahathaya
- Christy Leonard Perera as Kavi Kola Karaya
- Karl Gunasena as Karl Vyman
- D. R. Nanayakkara as Piloris
- Robin Fernando
- Sonia Disa
- B. S. Perera
- Anthony C. Perera as Andaya
- Joe Abeywickrama as Peda
- Hugo Fernando as Appuhamy
- Dommie Jayawardena
- Thilakasiri Fernando as Seeya
- Mohideen Baig
- N. R. Dias
- Douglas Wickremasinghe
- Dharmadasa Kuruppu

== Songs ==
- "Manga Hingana Kotath" – Mohideen Baig, Christy Leonard Perera, J. A. Milton Perera and C. T. Fernando
- "Sakala Sirin Piri" – Christy Leonard Perera
- "Mangalam Jaya Mangalam" – Mohideen Baig
- "Unath Dahi Marunath Dahi" – Mohideen Baig, J. A. Milton Perera, Wellu and chorus
- "Atha Gamak" – Latha Walpola
