= Sikuru Tharuwa =

- Directed by: L. S. Ramachandran
- Screenplay by: P. K. D. Seneviratne
- Produced by: John Edmund Amaratunga
- Starring: Punya Heendeniya; D. R. Nanayakkara; Shelton Silva
- Music by: Chandraratne Manawasinghe (lyrics); Karunaratne Abeysekera (lyrics); W. D. Amaradeva (music); R. Muttusamy (music)
- Release date: 27 September 1963
- Country: Sri Lanka
- Language: Sinhala

Sikuru Tharuwa is a 1963 Sri Lankan drama directed by L. S. Ramachandran and written by P. K. D. Seneviratne. It was developed by the Kurulu Rana group that attempted to make original movies pertaining to Sinhalese culture.

== Plot ==
The village headman of a small village is a drunkard and womanizer who is disliked by the village for his abusive ways. He hassles the heroine and other characters. At the end of the film he goes mad.

== Cast ==
- Punya Heendeniya as Anula
- D. R. Nanayakkara as Village Headsman
- Nelson Karunagama as Teacher
- Shelton Silva as District Revenue Officer
- H. D. Kulatunga
- Millie Kahandawela
- S. A. Jamis
- Nelson Karunagama as Teacher
- Jessica Wickramasinghe
- Dharmadasa Kuruppu
- Francis Perera
- Wimala Amaradeva

== Songs ==
- "Ira Handa Payana Loke" – W. D. Amaradeva and chorus
- "Oru Pade Pade Kiri Muhude" – Sujatha Perera and chorus
- "Gamana Nonimeyi" – Narada Disasekera
- "Himagiri Kandu Mudune" – S. Panibharatha and Wimala Gunaratne
- "Kurulu Rahanakage Samagiya" – J. A. Milton Perera, Noel Guneratne and chorus

== Production ==
=== Development ===
Sikuru Tharuwa was the second production of the John Edmund Amaratunga led Kurula Rana group after Kurulu Bedda. Most of the cast and crew from the earlier film were again part of the production including the screenwriter P. K. D. Seneviratne, stars Punya Heendeniya and D. R. Nanayakkara and director L. S. Ramachandran.

== Reception ==
The film was well received by audiences and local critics alike. Viewers hailed it the best Sinhalese film of the year in a newspaper poll and it was awarded seven national awards; Sarasaviya named D. R. Nanayakkara, Best Actor for the year of 1963. Critics praised the outdoor locations used in shooting and the original storyline about Sinhalese village life.
