= C. T. Fernando =

Sri Lankan musician (1921–1977)

C. T. Fernando සී.ටී. ප්‍රනාන්දු
- Born: Cyril Tudor Fernando; January 28, 1921; Colombo, British Ceylon
- Died: October 17, 1977 (aged 56); Colombo, Sri Lanka
- Other names: CT
- Education: St. Mary's College, Nawalpitiya
- Occupations: Singer, composer
- Spouse: Dhanawathie Gunasekara alias Dhana Fernando (m. 1951)
- Children: Priyantha Fernando
- Musical career
- Genres: Pop; soul; rhythm and blues
- Instrument: Vocals,
- Years active: 1940—1977
- Labels: HMV; Columbia

Cyril Tudor Fernando (28 January 1921 – 17 October 1977; Sinhala: සිරිල් ටියුඩර් ප්‍රනාන්දු), popularly known as C.T. Fernando, was a Sri Lankan singer and composer. One of the most popular singers in Sri Lankan music often known as the First Pop singer in Sri Lanka, Fernando was praised by critics for the themes and wording of his songs like "Vana Bamaru," "Bilinda Nelwa Ukule" and "Rosa Male." His other popular songs include "Lo Ada Ninde", "Gile Male Tarawa" and "Mariya Mawu Kuse."

== Personal life ==
Fernando was born on 28 January 1921 in Uyana Road, Dehiwela, Sri Lanka. (Note: Leading cinema source Sarasaviya recorded he was born in Uyana Road, Dehiwala. However in Daily Newspaper, the birthplace is cited as Kadalana, Moratuwa.) He later grew up in Nawalapitiya. He educated at St. Mary's College, Nawalpitiya. As a student C.T. showed interest in the arts participating in school dramas and singing with the local church choir.

Fernando met his future wife Dhanawathie (Dhana) Gunasekara in 1951. Dhana was born in Badulla and studied at Badulla Girls' High School. She fell in love with CT's voice. Her favourite song was "Pin Siduwanne". She wrote love letters to CT. He also fell in love with her. CT and Dhana got married secretly from their parents with the help of Latha Walpola despite strong opposition from her parents. The couple had one son: Priyantha, who was born in 1952.

On the night of October 17, 1977, Fernando returned to his home in Dehiwala on foot around midnight after performing at a concert. Upon his arrival, he complained to his wife, Dhanawathie (Dhana), of a mild pain in his chest.

Concerned, his wife sought the help of their neighbor, Ivo Martins, to transport him to Kalubowila Hospital. Fernando lost consciousness at the hospital and died on the same day from a heart attack. He was 56 years old at the time of his death. His wife, Dhana, died several years later on September 25, 2012.

His son, Priyantha Fernando, was also a popular singer in Sri Lanka who continued his father's legacy. Priyantha and his wife, Piyaseeli, have two sons, Conrad Tisara Fernando (CT Junior) and Danushka Ryan Fernando. In April 2018, Priyantha fell ill during a concert in Italy. He later returned to Sri Lanka and was treated at the Kalubowila Hospital. He died on May 1, 2018, at the age of 65 while receiving treatment.

== Early career ==
Fernando often won prizes for elocution, singing and drama, including a gold medal of oratory. He was a chorister in his local parish church, and later became the choir master of A.R.P. Messenger service in Colombo between 1942 and 1965. He later joined the Grand Cabaret to entertain the troops involved in world war 2 and further developed his musical talents.

In 1946, Fernando successfully auditioned for a position as grade one radio artist on Radio Ceylon. His first radio song was Sawas Kala Aele. Then he had his first popular song with "Pin Sindu Wanne," a plea to children to stop harming birds. The song was written by R. N. H. Perera.

== Commercial artist ==
In 1952 Fernando branched out as a commercial artist signing with HMV subsidiary Cargills Company. The melody of many of his songs are his own creations. Many of these songs got inspiration from western songs. He recorded many of his popular songs with the label including "Pinsiduwanne", "Suwanda Rosa", "Bara Bage", "Ambilimame", "Lo Ada Ninde", "Gilimale Taruwa", "Kimada Sumihiriye", "Amba Ruk" and "Bilinda Nelawe Ukule". The song "Berena Pini Bindu" is said to be influenced by a Polish song. The song "Salalihini Kovul Handa" got the accent of English song and the song "Sigiri Sukumaliye" became the first Sinhala song to be composed in the rhythm of the Bosanova. The song "Ranwan Ran Kendi Pirala" is the first Sinhala 'Rock and Roll' song.

From 1959 to 1960, Fernando was rated the most popular singer in the country. He continued his recording career recording the LP "The Golden Voice of C.T. Fernando" with the Lewis Brown company. Popular Songs such as "Hela Jathika Abhimane","Ma Bala Kale", "Sandhawata Ran Tharu","Ane Dingak", "Piyumehi Peni bothi","Punsadha Hinehenne" a Duet with Rukmani Devi, "Sihina lowe", "Awadhiwanna" and "Mage sudhu Mame" were included in this album. The Original Music arrangements and Direction for these songs in the album were done by the renowned musician Patrick Denipitiya. These recordings featured lyrics by Lalith S. Maithripala, Karunaratne Abeysekera, Sarath Wimalaweera and Wimaladasa Perera.
The music for some of his songs were composed by Fernando himself in addition to B. S. Perera and Patrick Denipitiya.

Fernando recorded a popular duet, "Pun Sanda Hinahenne," with Rukmani Devi. Another duet, "Selalihini Kovul Handa," was done with Latha Walpola. Most of his duets were sung together with Rukmani Devi and Latha Walpola as well as Chandra de Silva. He was the first Sri Lankan Artist to tour overseas with Music Director "Patrick Denipitiya and his Combo" in 1967 performing at various venues in UK, France, Italy, Switzerland, Spain and other Europe destinations during a period of 6 months. Meanwhile, from 1960 to 1966, he was featured in the “Little Hut” at the Mount Lavinia Hotel. Then he featured at the “Coconut Grove” at the Galle Face Hotel. Then he became the first Ceylonese singer to perform at the Commonwealth Institute in London. Meanwhile, he made hugely successful EP record titled "Sigiri Sukumaliye" with Silverline in 1975.

== Cinema career ==
Apart from singing, Fernando also acted in a few Sinhala films such as Deyiyange Rate and Gamperaliya directed by Lester James Peries. He sang a popular Virindu song in the 1958 film Deyyange Rate. In the film Gamperaliya, he played the role of matchmaker. In 1947, he played the role of a villager in the play Sirisangabo produced by J. D. A. Perera. In addition, he sang the song "Mara Dadenek" in the new production of John de Silva's play Sri Wickrama and acted in the play Vidura produced by Chitrasena.

CT's popular film song Mee Wadayaki Jeewithe was sung to the movie Kawuda Hari in 1969. The song was composed by Karunaratne Abeysekara and the music is composed by Sisira Senaratne. A song he sung at the Ananda Festival in the film Nimwalalla in 1970 created by school children at Ananda College was recorded by CT.

== Track listing ==
- Adada Eeye Wage
- Amathannata Haki
- Ambaruk Sevanalle
- Ambili Mame
- Anantha Gee
- Ane Dingak Innako
- Api Avidimu Handapane
- Asaranaya Dugee (Film: Hathara Maha Nidhanaya)
- Atha Weeriyen
- Awadiwanna Awadiwanna
- Bara Bage
- Berena Pani Bidu
- Bilinda Nalawena
- Dawasa Gevee
- Dilindu Pale
- Etha Kandu Rali (with C.D. Fonseka) (Film: Sangawunu Menika)
- Gatha Sitha Samakarala
- Geevana Mihire
- Hela Jathika Abhimane
- Jesu Rajaaneni (with Latha Walpola)
- Kale Mala Nowe
- Kalu Mahawali
- Kimada Sumihiriye
- Koheda Ane
- Kowulange Mihiri
- Kusaguru Muthu Wal (Film: Nim Walalla)
- Laksha Ganan (Film: Sarawita) (with Anton Rodrigo)
- Lo Ada Ninde
- Ma Bala Kale
- Ma Hada Sihil
- Ma Oba Hamu Wu (with Rukmani Devi)
- Ma Sukumali
- Mage Sudu Mame
- Mal Bara Himidiriye (with Latha Walpola)
- Mal Loke Rani
- Mal Sara Pem
- Mee Amba Wanaye (Film: Pem Kurulloo)
- Mee Wadayaki Jeewithe (Film: Kawuda Hari)
- Nisala Rae (with Latha Walpola)
- Onchili Chili
- Paravunu Mal
- Pinsidu Wanne (with Suriya Rani)
- Piyumehi Pani Bothi
- Prayamaye Sihina
- Punsanda Hinahenne (with Rukmani Devi)
- Rae Pal Rakala
- Rae Tharu Babalanawa (with Anjaleen Gunathilake)
- Rana Monarai
- Ranwan Ran Kendi
- Salalihini Kowul Handa
- Saman Devi Pihiten (with Anjaleen Gunathilake) (Film: Deyyanne Ratey)
- Saman Kakulu
- Sandawata Rantharu
- Santhose Paedenna
- Sarungaley Sarungaley
- Seetha Raeye (with Latha Walpola)
- Selalihini Kowul (with Latha Walpola)
- Senakeliye Maa
- Sihina Lowe
- Soobanalu Kolamba (Film: Hathara Maha Nidhanaya)
- Sundara Soobana (with Rukmani Devi)
- Sunila Waralasa
- Suwanda Rosa Mal
- Vana Bambaro
- Wassak Enawa (with Pushparani Ariyaratne)
