= W. D. Amaradeva =

Sri Lankan vocalist (1927–2016)

Sri Lankabhimanya Pandit W. D. Amaradeva
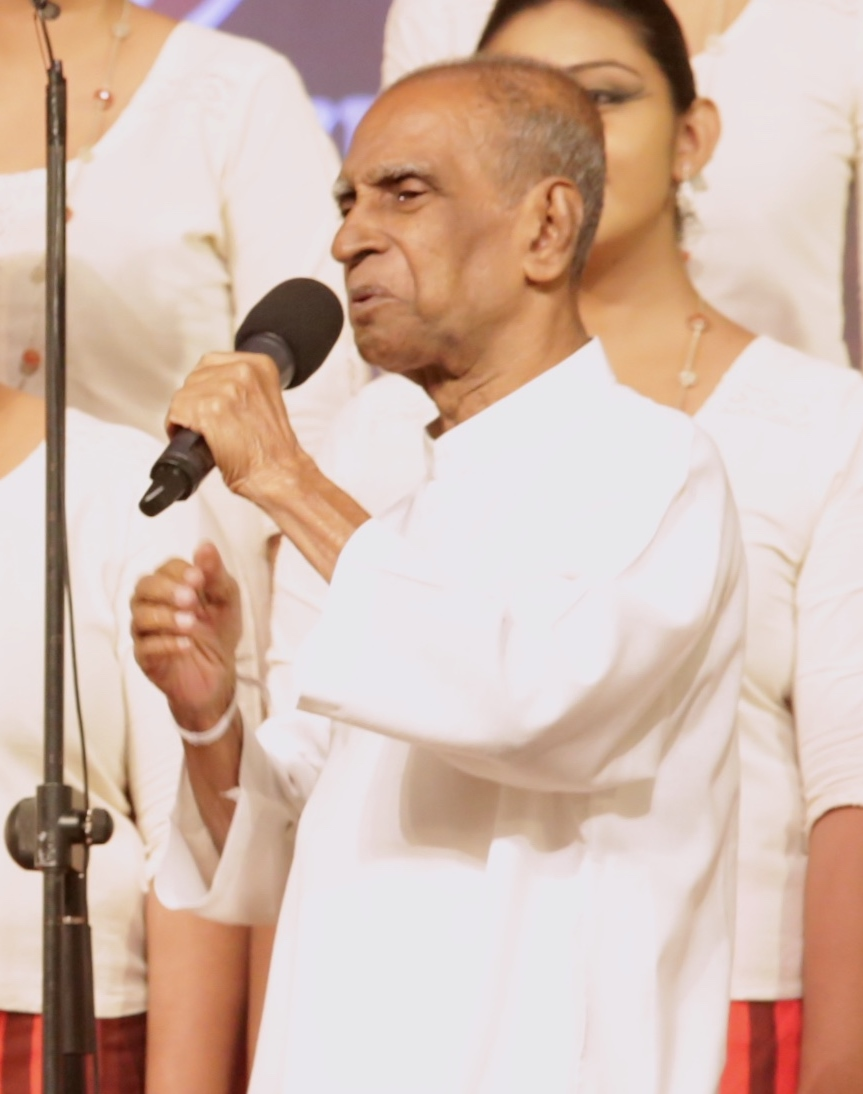
- Pandit Amaradeva in 2014
- Born: Wannakuwatta Waduge Don Albert Perera; 5 December 1927; Moratuwa, British Ceylon
- Died: 3 November 2016 (aged 88); Sri Jayawardenepura Kotte, Sri Lanka
- Education: Bhatkhande Music Institute; Siddharta Vidyalaya; Kalutara Vidyalaya; Moratu Maha Vidyalaya Sri Sumangala College
- Occupations: Musician, singer, composer, Chancellor of the University of the Visual and Performing Arts
- Years active: 1947–2016
- Spouse: Wimala Amaradewa
- Children: Ranjana, Subhani, and Priyanvada
- Awards: Philippine Ramon Magsaysay Award (2001), Indian Padma Sri Award (2002), President's Award of Kala Keerthi (1986), Doctor of Philosophy (Fine Arts) Honoris Causa (University of Kelaniya - 1991), The Degree of Doctor of Letters (University of Ruhuna - 1993), Honorary degree of Doctor of Letters (University of Peradeniya) (1998), Deshamanya (1998), Sri Lankabhimanya (2017)
- Website: amaradevafoundation.com

Sri Lankabhimanya Wannakuwattawaduge Don Albert Perera (Sinhala: වන්නකුවත්තවඩුගේ දොන් ඇල්බට් පෙරේරා; Tamil: டபிள்யூ. டி. அமரதேவா; 5 December 1927 – 3 November 2016), better known by his adopted name Amaradeva, was a prominent Sri Lankan Sinhalese vocalist, violinist and composer. Primarily using traditional instruments like sitars, tablas and harmoniums, he incorporated Sinhala folk music with Indian ragas in his work. Many consider his contribution to the development of Sinhala music as unmatched; hence, he is occasionally cited as the "Maestro of Sri Lankan Music" (Sinhala: හෙළයේ මහා ගාන්ධර්වයා, romanized: Helayay Maha Gandarvaya).

In the mid-1950s, Amaradeva in his Janagayana project consulted experts of the Kandyan dance tradition like Panibharatha, Kiriganita, Gunamala, Ukkuva and Suramba in his path to understand what constituted Sinhala folk music. Noting that it mostly revolved around a single melody, he decided to add verses that would lead up to the central melody which would now be a chorus thus forming two parts (unseen earlier in traditional Sri Lankan music) removing restrictions that had existed earlier. In doing so, he created a uniquely Sinhalese music style that stayed true to folk tradition while incorporating outside influences. His work was vital in the creation of the "sarala gee" genre practised subsequently by artists like Sanath Nandasiri, Victor Ratnayake, T.M. Jayaratne, Sunil Edirisinghe and Gunadasa Kapuge etc.

Amaradeva received numerous awards, including the Philippine Ramon Magsaysay Award (2001), Indian Padma Shri Award (2002) and Sri Lankan "President's Award of Kala Keerthi" (1986) and Deshamanya Award (1998). In 2003 the French government awarded him the prestigious honour; Ordre des Arts et des Lettres. Notably he still remains the most popular artist as confirmed by Nielsen Media Research findings. He has also represented Sri Lanka in many forums including the UNESCO 1967 Manila Symposium. The University of Kelaniya conferred on him the Degree of Doctor of Philosophy (Fine Arts) Honoris Causa in 1991 and the University of Ruhuna and University of Peradeniya conferred on him the Degree of Doctor of Letters, Honoris Causa in 1993 and 1998.

In 1972, Amaradeva composed the music for the Gaumee Salaam (Maldives' National Anthem) at the request of Maldivian government.

Amaradeva died at the age of 88 on 3 November 2016 due to heart failure. A state funeral was held by the government, followed by a week of national mourning.

== Personal life ==
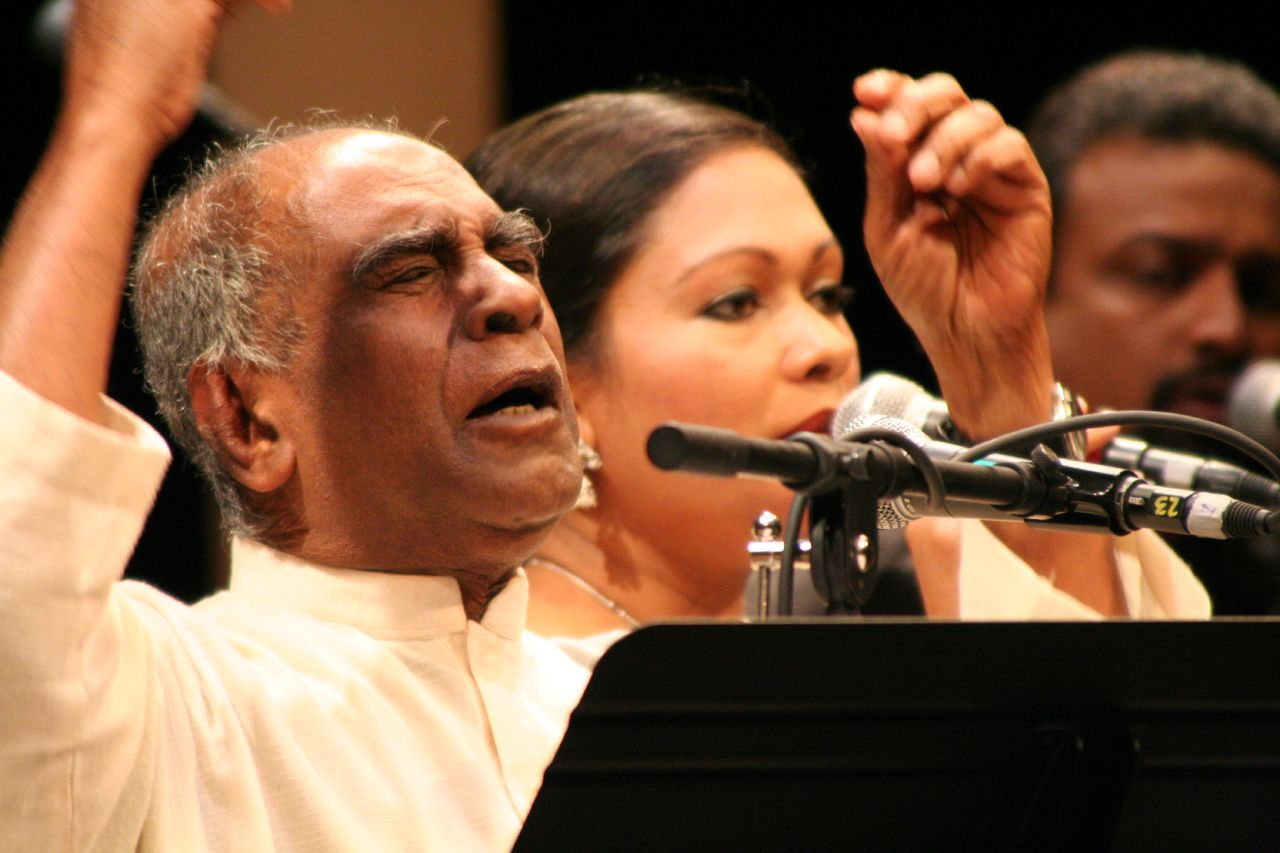
Amaradeva at one of his performances.

Amaradeva was born the youngest of seven children to a carpenter, Wannakuwatta Waduge Don Ginoris Perera, and Balapuwaduge Maggie Weslina Mendis at Janapriya Mawatha in Koralawella, Moratuwa. Perera was a Buddhist while Mendis was a Methodist bringing both Christian and Buddhist values and music traditions to the family.

Amardeva was introduced to music at a young age by his father who crafted and repaired violins at Moratumulla Wadu Kaarmika Vidyalaya (Carpentry School). Amaradeva would often strum the violin while his mother sang hymns. Another family influence was Amaradeva's elder brother who taught Indian classical music to him. Amaradeva was presented with his own instrument on his seventh birthday which was a Japanese made tin violin by his father.

Amaradeva obtained his early education under Ven. Malalankara Nayaka Tero of the Koralawella temple. With the development of his musical talent, Amaradeva was asked to recite poems at the temple; he was subsequently picked to lead the village choir. He was first entered into Sri Saddharmodaya Buddhist mixed School in Koralawella. The principal of that school, Mr. K. J. Fernando was an active member of Hela Hawula and had a close connection with Kumaratunga Munidasa. He knew about Amaradeva's talent and introduced him to Kumaratunga. Amaradeva was lucky to be appreciated by Kumaratunga for his singing talent. Since he had a chance to accompany all these scholars during his childhood, he had an interest in national identity and language. When he was studying in grade five at Koralawella School, a music teacher called Mr. W. J. Fernando was transferred to his school from Kalutara. Hence, W.J. Fernando was the first school music teacher of Amaradeva. He realized Amaradeva's talent and directed him on singing and playing. Under his guidance, Amaradeva won all the school singing competitions. Even the teacher let him conduct the classroom when he was not there.

While attending the school, he won a poetry contest held at the Moratuwa Vidyalaya. Amaradeva also led the school choir to a triumphant showing at a contest held by the Colombo Arts Society. His poetry win prompted school teachers to get him a showcase to recite poetry on Radio Ceylon. In 1945 Amaradeva won a gold medal at a music and violin contest held by Jana Kala Mandalaya Amaradeva's fame that was limited only to the Koralawella, started spreading over other areas. Because of his increasing popularity, several schools offered him scholarships.

Amaradeva entered Sri Sumangala College, Panadura after completing his primary education with a scholarship for English. At the school, he formed a friendship with the music teacher and principal Danister Thomas Fernando, who was the elder brother of Amaradeva's first music teacher W. J. Fernando. D. T. Fernando who was living in Kalutara helped Amaradeva get into Kalutara Vidyalaya and subsequently to Siddharta Vidyalaya Balapitiya.

He was married to Wimala Gunaratne in 1962. The couple has three children: Ranjana, Subhani, and Priyanvada. Wimala Amaradeva died on 8 March 2021 at the age of 86.

== Career ==
Young Amaradewa met Sunil Santha, a prominent artist at the time at one of Sunil Santha's concerts. Since he showed interest Sunil Santha invited Amaradewa to audition at Chitrasena studios. There he played in front of Sunil Santha, Chitrasena and A. J. Ranasinghe and impressed them. This meeting and related events are described in detail by A. J. Ranasinghe, Dr. Nandadasa Kodagoda and Sunil Santha. After the audition Sunil Santha brought Amaradewa to stay at Chitrasena Studios, his roommate was A. J. Ranasinghe.

By chance filming of the film Ashokamala commenced nearby. Gerard J. Pieris of Moratuwa introduced Amaradeva to Mohamed Ghouse Master who was handling the music for the film and Ghouse recognising Amaradeva's skill enlisted him as the top violinist in his orchestra. Amaradeva left his studies and accompanied Ghouse to India to work on the film. He would play a triple role of singing, dancing and acting on the film with the song "Ayi Yameku Kale Ale.". At Lucknow, Bhatkande Amaradeva came under the tutelage of the supreme violinist Vishnu Govind Jog who regarded the young Sri Lankan as a prized pupil and protégé. Amaradeva graduated after five years with two Visharads as both a violinist and vocalist.

He found steady work as an artist on Radio Ceylon, where his unique vision and talent could be exhibited to an audience wider than he had ever before known – earning him a position at the Bhatkhande Music Institute in Lucknow, India. In 1955, Amaradeva won the All India violin competition. After extensive training, Albert returned to Sri Lanka as Pandit Wannakuwatta waduge Don Amaradeva. The name Amaradeva which translates as Immortal god was given to him by Prof. Ediriweera Sarachchandra (Sri Lanka's foremost playwright and a close associate).

During this time, Sri Lanka (then Ceylon) had only begun emerging as an independent nation, and the question of what Sri Lankan music was, was slowly being addressed with equal vigour by intellectuals, artists and the general public. In response to the spirit of these times, Amaradeva began interweaving indigenous folk music with the North Indian ragas he had studied in Lucknow, thereby giving expression to a more sophisticated cadence.

His other innovations include his experimentation with Western harmonies and counter-harmonies, as well as with South Indian and Tamil musical forms. In the song 'Ran Dahadiya Bindu Bindu', Amaradeva incorporated the Baila music of his hometown. His opus, however, remains the work he did with Sri Lanka's celebrated lyricist Mahagama Sekera, in exploring the contours of fusing classical Sinhala poetry with his unique musical intonation. In time, Amaradeva's music came to reflect an entire philosophy, reflective of the spirit of a nation.

He has composed music for ballet (Karadiya, Nala Damayanthi, etc.), film (Ranmuthu Duwa, Gam Peraliya, Ran Salu, Delovak Athara, Gatavarayo, Rena Girav, Thun Man Handiya, Puran Appu, etc.), theatre (Wessantara, etc.), radio and television. He is the creator of the mando-harp, a musical instrument combining the mandolin and the harp.

Amaradeva is credited as having introduced artists such as Nanda Malini and Edward Jayakody to the wider audience. Many artists such as Sunil Edirisinghe, Victor Ratnayake and Neela Wickramasinghe have credited him as a major influence on their work. Dr. Lester James Peries has described his voice as the greatest musical instrument. Amaradeva has also been described as the defining musician of Sinhala civilization for his role in the creation of a national tradition.

Amaradeva was married to Wimala, together they had one son (Ranjana Amaradeva), and two daughters (Subhani Amaradeva, herself a talented vocalist, and Priyanvada Amaradeva). He was a patron of numerous charities. W. D. Amaradeva was the second Chancellor of the University of the Visual and Performing Arts and Second Chancellor of the Wayamba University of Sri Lanka (09/2002 – 09/2007).

In 2015 Amaradeva made a duet with popular young artist, Umaria Sinhawansa prior to his demise. That particular song Hanthana Sihine has been viewed more than 15 million times on YouTube.

== Death ==
Amaradeva was admitted to Sri Jayawaradanapura Teaching Hospital due to a sudden illness. He died at the age of 88 on 3 November 2016 while receiving treatment at the Intensive Care Unit. The cause of death was a heart failure. The government subsequently announced that a state funeral would be held with a week of national mourning. His remains were given state honours at the Independence Memorial Hall for two days, the first time in the country's history where remains were kept at the Independence Memorial Hall.

== Legacy ==
A musical hermitage will be built in Colombo in the memory of late Amaradeva in an area of 100 perches. President Maithripala Sirisena participated in the inauguration ceremony and will be called Amaradeva Asapuwa.

== Honours ==
- The title of Sri Lankabhimanya highest national honor award by the Government of Sri Lanka posthumously in 2017.
- Officier (officer) of the Ordre des Arts et des Lettres (Order of Arts and Letters) from the French government (2003)
- Padma Shri Award from India (2002)
- The Ramon Magsaysay Award of the Philippines (2001)
- Title of Deshamanya from the Government of Sri Lanka (1998)
- Honorary degree of Doctor of Letters from University of Peradeniya (1998)
- Honorary degree of Doctor of Letters (Honoris Causa) from University of Ruhuna (1993)
- Honorary degree of Doctor of Philosophy (Fine Arts) Honoris Causa from University of Kelaniya (1991)
- Title of Kala Keerthi from the Government of Sri Lanka (1986)

== Filmography ==
=== Music director ===
Year	Film	Other notes
1962	Ran Muthu Duwa	debut as music director
1963	Adata Wadiya Heta Hondai	songs only
1963	Sikuru Tharuwa	Ira Handa Paayana Loke
1963	Gamperaliya	
1963	Getawarayo	Aarichchi Borichchi
1965	Saama	background music
1965	Laa Dalu	
1965	Saaravita	
1965	Adarayai Karunawai	
1966	Delovak Athara	
1966	Westhuru Siritha	
1970	Akkara Paha	
1981	Valampuri	
