= Nidhanaya =

- Directed by: Lester James Peries
- Written by: G. B. Senanayake
- Screenplay by: Tissa Abeysekara
- Produced by: R Anthonypillai
- Starring: Malini Fonseka; Gamini Fonseka; Shanthi Lekha; Saman Bokalawela; Trilicia Gunawardena; Francis Perera; Wijeratne Warakagoda
- Cinematography: M. S. Ananda
- Edited by: Lester James Peries; Edvin Leetin; Gladvin Fernando
- Music by: Premasiri Kemadasa
- Release date: 19 February 1972
- Running time: 108 minutes
- Country: Sri Lanka
- Language: Sinhala

Nidhanaya (English: The Treasure) is a 1972 Sinhalese language film directed by Dr. Lester James Peries, the screenplay, dialogue and script by Dr. Tissa Abeysekara, starring Gamini Fonseka and Malini Fonseka. The film stars Gamini Fonseka and Malini Fonseka in lead roles along with Shanthi Lekha, Saman Bokalawela and Trilicia Gunawardena in supportive roles.

The movie is based on a short story written by G.B.Senanayake in one of his short story collection known as "The Revenge". It revolves around a murder which is committed for the purpose of gaining access to a hidden treasure. The film won the Silver Lion of St. Mark award at the 1972 Venice International Film Festival and was also selected as one of the outstanding films of the year, receiving a Diploma, at the London Film Festival. It was also chosen as the best film of the first 50 years of Sri Lankan cinema and was included among the top 100 films of the century by the Cinémathèque Française.

== Synopsis ==
Willy Abenayake (Gamini Fonseka) is a wealthy man from a village in Sri Lanka who is interested in superstitious things. One day, he finds an old palm leaf manuscript which reveals the location of a treasure hidden in a rock cave belonging to an ancient king. However, according to the manuscript, he must sacrifice the life of a virgin woman with four black birthmarks on her neck to gain access to the treasure.

One day, while walking by a river, he comes across a young woman (Malini Fonseka) who has four black birthmarks on her neck. After following her and finding out more about her, he decides to marry her. Eventually, he marries her and spends time with her.

Meanwhile, she notices that her husband is always lost in thought. One day, she asks him what is making him think so much. He replies that he has to perform a religious ritual for a god in a rock. His wife agrees and arranges everything for it.

After going to the rock, he starts to fulfil the ritual, finally killing his wife as a sacrifice in the hope of gaining access to the hidden treasure. Unfortunately, he is still unable to find the treasure.

He goes home, saddened, and decides to write the whole story in his diary. After finishing it, he commits suicide by hanging himself.

== Cast ==
- Gamini Fonseka as Wilson 'Willie' Abeynayake
- Malini Fonseka as Irene Abeynayake
- Francis Perera as Juwanis
- Saman Bokalawala as Mudliyar 'Julius'
- Mapa Gunaratne as Doctor
- Shanthi Lekha as Irene's Amma
- Trilicia Gunawardena as Dulcie
- Thilakasiri Fernando as Diyonis 'Gurunnanse'
- J. B. L. Gunasekera as Willie's Thaththa
- Thalatha Gunasekara as Willie's childhood nanny
- Kumarasinghe Appuhamy as Thelanis 'Gurunnanse'
- K. L. Coranelis Appuhamy as Willie's Aiyya
- Barry Whittington as MacNeal
- Wijeratne Warakagoda as Silva
- Devika Karunaratne as the Royal coronation birthmark possessor

== Restoration ==
In 2013, Shivendra Singh Dungarpur collaborated with the World Cinema Foundation (WCF) for the restoration of the film. The film won the Silver Lion at the 1972 Venice International Film Festival.

Dr. Peries’ films are in poor condition and many of the original camera negatives have been lost. This restoration is a joint effort of the WCF, the Sri Lankan National Film Corporation, Mr. Padmarajah (the copyright holder), the National Film Archive of India (NFAI) and Sameera Randeniya of Film Team, Sri Lanka.
