= S. Panibharatha =

Sri Lankan dancer (1920–2006)

- ආචාර්ය එස්. පණීභාරත
- Born: Sithratchcharige Panis Algama; February 24, 1920; Kegalle, Sri Lanka
- Died: February 20, 2006 (aged 85); Colombo, Sri Lanka
- Other names: Pani
- Education: Keenadeniya Maha Vidyalaya
- Occupations: Dancer; Choreographer
- Years active: 1935–2000
- Spouse: Piyumachari Premalatha (m. 1954–2005)
- Children: Upuli, Jayawanthi
- Parents: Pabanchi Algama (father); Dingiri Ukku Amma (mother)
- Relatives: Channa Wijewardena (son-in-law); Dayasiri Jayasekara (son-in-law); Aseka Wijewardena (grand daughter)
- Awards: Kala Suri, Kala Keerthi, Dharshanasuri

Sithratchcharige Panis Algama (Sinhala: ආචාර්ය එස්. පණීභාරත; 24 February 1920 – 20 February 2006 (Note: Some local newspapers cited his death in 20 February 2006. But Sunday Observer, BBC Sinhala and Sarasaviya cited his death was on September 20, 2005.)), known as S. Panibharatha, was a prominent Sri Lankan dancer and choreographer. Considered to be the pioneer of Sinhala classical dance, Panibhratha heavily contributed to Sri Lankan dance as an art form in a career that spanned over five decades.

== Personal life ==
Panibharatha was born on February 24, 1920, in Algama, Kegalle, Sri Lanka, as the second of six sons. He belonged to the Algama Dance generation of the Hathara Korale of the Kegalle District. Panibharatha was called "Panis" or "Pani" by his family members. His father, Pabanchi Algama, also known as Paba Gurunanse, was a prolific Kandyan dancer. His mother, Dingiri Ukku Amma, was a housewife. Panibharatha's father, uncles, and paternal grandfather all partook in the art of dance and taught Panibharatha dance and drumming at an early age. Panibharatha studied at Keenadeniya Maha Vidyalaya.

In 1954, Panibharatha married Piyumathchari Premalatha, a dance teacher who worked at Henagama Maha Vidyalaya. The couple had two daughters, Upuli and Jayawanthi. Both daughters also became dancers, and Upuli's daughter, Aseka also became a dancer and choreographer. Upuli is married to fellow dancer and choreographer, Channa Wijewardena. Jayawanthi is married to politician and singer Dayasiri Jayasekara, the younger brother of singer Kithsiri Jayasekara.

Panibharatha died on September 20, 2005, at the age of 85, following a brief illness. The body was laid at the University of Aesthetic Studies in Colombo until noon on September 21, 2005, for final rites. The funeral took place at Borella Kanatta on September 22, 2005.

== Career ==
Panibharatha's parents pressured him to become a doctor, so he was transferred to the Thibbotuwawe Gunananda Thero, who lived in Ratnapura, to practice medicine. While Panibharatha studied medicine, he continued to practice dancing. In 1937, J. D. A Perera invited him to work as a drummer for Perera's wife, Chandralekha, in Colombo. In 1940, Panibharatha dressed as a traditional Ves Dancer at the Attanagalle Rajamaha Vihara for his traditional inauguration into dancing.

After seeing his excellence in drumming and dancing, J. D. A Perera allowed Panibharatha to attend his school, Lawrence College, as a student. He was also permitted to work as a dance teacher while studying at the school. Later, he entered the Vidyalankara Pirivena to learn the Sanskrit language and literature from Rambukwella Sri Siddhartha Thero. In 1938, at the age of 18, he was appointed as the dance teacher at Nalanda College, Colombo.

After working as a teacher for several years at Nalanda College, Panibharatha received a scholarship in 1944 and entered Shanti Niketan University in West Bengal. There, he learned the Indian classical dance traditions of Kathakali and Manipuri and learned to play the tabla, the mridanga, and the pabawaj. Panibharatha also performed in several dramas produced by Rabindranath Tagore during this period. After returning to Sri Lanka in 1948, J. D. A Perera established the title of "Panibharatha" in his honor by a leading panel of scholars. Panibharatha was then appointed to the Royal College in Colombo, after which he went to Mirigama Junior College. There, he became the head of the first division of the College of Dance. Panibharatha later became the Dancing Instructor at the Teacher Training College, Mirigama.

In 1952, he was appointed the Principal of Heywood Lalitha Kalayathanaya, then the State Institute for Artists. On May 1, 1974, the University of Sri Lanka, then the Institute of Aesthetics, became an institution with Panibharatha as the Head of the Department of Dance. On January 1, 1979, the Institute of Aesthetic Studies became an affiliate of the University of Kelaniya, and Panibharatha became its first Head of Department.

Panibharatha was very fluent in Pali, Sanskrit, and English and took part in all Sri Lankan dance cultures. He invented a dance called Narilatha and was instrumental in introducing dance items such as Puja Dance, Drum Orchestra, and Paddy Harvesting Poems in a concert to a proscenium stage.

Apart from academic activities, Panibharatha created several ballets. Panibharatha also choreographed films, such as Sikuru Tharuwa, Kurulu Bedda, and Asoka, through and Indian experiences. In his concerts, he used a wide array of dancing strategies as well as drum orchestra fusions.

Panibharatha has led many cultural events abroad representing Sri Lanka in the 1950s. He directed and acted in the ballet Sama Vijaya sent to the World Youth Congress in Russia in 1958 and headed the Commonwealth Arts Festival in 1965. He also represented Sri Lanka in Pakistan in 1966, in Canada in 1967, in Russia in 1974, and in Japan in 1975. In 1953, Panibharatha and a dance troupe toured Europe and performed the traditional song "Goyam Kepeeme Netuma" at the Commonwealth Art Festival in London before Queen Elizabeth II in 1954. He has received the Kalasuri Presidential Honor in recognition of his invaluable service to the field of Dance Arts and the Dharshanasuri Awards presented by the University of Kelaniya in 1996.

== Legacy ==
His birthday was declared National Dance Day in 2006 by the Ministry of Culture in recognition of his outstanding services to the art of dance. On August 17, 2012, the Gamini Fonseka Memorial Hall of the Sinhala Cultural Institute held the Panibharatha Pranama Festival. On February 24, 2015, the Minister of State for Cultural Affairs, Nandimithra Ekanayake, inaugurated the new Theater Faculty at the Faculty of Dance and Drama of the University of the Visual and Performing Arts and named it Panibharatha Theater. On the same day, several students displaying various artistic talents received scholarships under his name.

On February 24, 2020, Prime Minister Mahinda Rajapaksa held a ceremony celebrating Panibharatha's 100th birthday and the launch of the book Guru Deva Panibharatha. A commemorative stamp was also issued that day.
