= Thun Man Handiya =

- DVD Cover
- Directed by: Mahagama Sekera
- Written by: Mahagama Sekera
- Produced by: Chithra Balasuriya
- Starring: Joe Abeywickrema; Karunarathna Ranasinghe
- Cinematography: Sumittha Amarasinghe
- Edited by: Dillimuni Jayathissa
- Music by: W. D. Amaradeva
- Release date: 1970
- Running time: 93 mins
- Country: Sri Lanka
- Language: Sinhala

Thun Man Handiya movie (Sinhala for Three Way Junction) is a 1970 dramatic film made by Sri Lankan artist Mahagama Sekera and produced by Chithra Balasuriya. It is autobiographical and recounts Sekera's childhood though the character of Sirisena.

== Plot ==
The film is set in a small village and follows progression in painter Abilin's (Joe Abeywickrema) life through the eyes of his nephew Sirisena (Kumara Balasooriya, Karunarathna Ranasinghe). Abilin is an alcoholic and drifts through his life in debt and without focus. After getting into arguments with other villagers and his own brother (Dharmadasa Kuruppu), Abilin decides to take a job with a rich landowner (A. P. Gunarathna).

Sirisena then goes to art college inspired by his uncle. He develops his art skill there and dreams of showing his talent to Abilin. Abilin's situation, however, deteriorates due to alcoholism, juxtaposing serenely with Sirisena's foray into art in the city.

== Cast ==
- Joe Abeywickrama as Abilin Singho 'Mama'
- Kumara Balasooriya as Adolescent Sirisena
  - Karunaratne Ranasinghe as Young Sirisena
- Shanthi Lekha as Sirisena's Amma
- Dharmadasa Kuruppu as Podi Mama
- Denawaka Hamine as Sirisena's Achchi
- D. A. Balasuriya as Sirisena's Thaththa
- A. P. Gunaratne as Ralahamy
- Gemunu Wijesuriya as Aisey
- Somasiri Dehipitiya as Jamis
- Swarna Mallawarachchi as Yasawathie
- Srimathi B. Lekamge as Doctor
- Chandra Kaluarachchi as Sophie
- Chandrapala Wijesooriya as Podi Mahaththaya
- Soma Bopitiya as Hamine
- Geethani Wickramasinghe as Sudu Menike
- Sunil Jayaweera as Art Teacher
- Karunarathna Ranawaka as Napo Singho
- Dharmasena Athukorala as Jayasinghe Teacher
- Wijeratne Warakagoda as Nadagam performer
- D. S. Karunarathna as Varliyanu
- W. D. Amaradeva as Harmonium player

== Music ==
W. D. Amaradeva composed the music for the film and sang the song "Atheethayen Ganga." Wijerathna Warakagoda sings "Yannem Dakna Se Ma." Both were written by Mahagama Sekera with music by Amaradeva.

== Awards and nominations ==
1971 - The Most Promising Director - The Awards Festival of the Film Critics and Journalists of Ceylon in 1970 - 1971. Awarded to Director, Mahagama Sekera.

1972 - Diploma Certificate - Symposium of Young Cinematographers of Africa, Asia, and Latin America at the 17th International Film Festival in Karlovy Vary, Czechoslovakia. Awarded to Director, Mahagama Sekera.

1972 - Diploma Certificate - Committee for Afro-Asian Solidarity of the USSR, The Tashkent International Film Festival. Awarded to Director, Mahagama Sekera.

1980 - Mahagama Sekera was awarded for the Most Outstanding Film Creation of the Decade of 1970 at the OCIC [Office Catholique Internationale du Cinema] Salutation Festival held in 1980.

1997 - Mahagama Sekera was awarded the Golden Jubilee Award from the National Film Corporation of Sri Lanka. Thung Mang Handiya was rated among the ten best cinematic creations of the Sri Lankan Cinema.
