= D. R. Nanayakkara =

Sri Lankan actor (1915–1989)

- ඩී. ආර්. නානායක්කාර
- Born: Don Ruter Nanayakkara; March 15, 1915; Kolonnawa, British Ceylon
- Died: January 4, 1989 (aged 73); Colombo, Sri Lanka
- Education: Kolonnawa Govt. School; St. Matthew's College
- Occupation: Actor
- Years active: 1949–1989
- Spouse: Adeline Perera (m. 1945)
- Children: 6

Don Ruter Nanayakkara (15 March 1915 – 4 January 1989) was a Sri Lankan actor in Sri Lankan cinema as well as in British drama. Playing lanky villains and comedic characters, Nanayakkara gained popularity in movies like Rekava, Kurulu Bedda, and Sikuru Tharuwa. He also appeared as the old shaman in Steven Spielberg's 1984 Oscar-winning movie Indiana Jones and the Temple of Doom.

== Personal life ==
He was born on 15 March 1915 in Kolonnawa, Sri Lanka. His father Don Diyas Nanayakkara was from Kolonnawa. His mother Nonno Caldera was from Gothatuwa. He attended the Kolonnawa Government School and St. Matthew's College, Dematagoda. Starting as a child, he was drawn to music and learned to play the Japanese mandolin.

He was married to Adeline Perera in 1945, after he met while performing the play. They had six children: daughters – Asoka, Shanthi, Sirima, and Kalyani and sons – Dilip and Ranjith. Adeline died on March 10, 1983.

He died of AIDS-related tuberculosis in 1989. He had been diagnosed with HIV in 1988.

== Career ==
As a young adult, Nanayakkara showed interest in theater and became a regular attender of stage plays. At one such drama around 1936, he was noticed by playwright Sirisena Wimalaweera who took him into his troupe of players. Later he was chosen to play the role of 'Saranapala' in the play Amma. Beginning with Amma, Nanayakkara appeared in many of Wimalweera's plays; these include Seedevi, Pitisara Kella, Rodi Kella, and Maggona Charlie.

Nanayakkara debut in film came when Wimalaweera adapted Amma into a motion picture in 1949, two years after the release of the first major Sinhalese film Kadawunu Poronduwa. Nanayakkara dabbled as a vocalist in Wimalaweera's films singing two songs for Amma. He continued to appear in Wimalaweera's movies up to Wimalaweera's death in 1963.

Nanayakkara's had one of his most celebrated performances in Rekawa (1956) which is considered a landmark in film. He appeared in the critically acclaimed role of Sooty, the protagonist's father who is a thief and attempts to use his son's supposed healing powers to gain wealth causing a death and his son's condemnation by the whole villages.

Nanayakkara continued his celebrated villainous roles in Kurulu Bedda (1961), Sikuru Tharuwa (1966), and Binaramali (1969). He won the Sarasaviya Best Actor Award for his role in Bicycle Hora in 1968. In 1984, Nanayakkara was chosen as one of the Sri Lankan actors in Indiana Jones and the Temple of Doom. In the movie he played the old shaman of Mayapore, India, who tells Indiana Jones that Shiva brought him (Jones) to this village in order that he may go to Pankot Palace to find Shiva linga — a sacred stone that protects the village and which was stolen by individuals from the Palace — and return it to the village.

In Kathuru Muwath (1971) he played the lead role of the Kathuru Muwath. He had major roles in many of K.A.W. Perera's other films like Kapatikama (1966), Duleeka (1974), Lasanda (1974), and Nedeyo (1976). Working with Lester James Peries again in Baddegama (1981) he played another major negative role as the Medicine Man.

Other film appearances include Chandiya (1965), Parasathumal (1966), Ahasin Polawata (1978), Siribo Aiya (1980), and Dese Mal Pipila. Nanayakkara's last film Ahas Maliga was screened five years after his death.

== Filmography ==
=== Film ===
Year	Title	Role	Notes
1949	Amma	Saranapala	film debut
1956	Rekava	Sooty	
1961	Kurulu Bedda	Kaithan Baas	
1963	Sikuru Tharuwa	Village Headman	Sarasaviya Award for Best Actor (1964)
1965	Chandiya	Piloris	
1966	Parasathu Mal	Head Servant Amaris	
1966	Sudu Duwa		
1967	Saru Bima		
1967	Ran Salu		
1967	Rena Giraw		
1968	Vanasara		
1968	Singithi Surathal		
1968	Indunila		
1968	Hangi Hora		
1968	Dahasak Sithuvili	Man on bus	
1968	Bicycle Hora		Sarasaviya Award for Best Actor (1969)
1968	Ataweni Pudumaya		
1968	Amathikama		
1968	Akka Nago		
1968	Adarawanthayo		
1968	Abuddassa Kale		
1969	Binaramalee	Village Headman	
1969	Romeo Juliet Kathawak		
1970	Thewatha		
1970	Ohoma Hondada		
1971	Kathuru Muwath		
1972	Lokuma Hinawa		
1973	Sinawai Inawai	Bertie	
1973	Suhada Pathuma		
1974	Duleeka		
1974	Lasanda		
1975	Sukiri Kella		
1976	Nedeyo		
1977	Hithuwoth Hithuwamai	Podi Appu	
1977	Siripala Saha Ranmenika		
1977	Maruwa Samaga Wase		
1977	Vishmaya		
1977	Sandawata Ran Tharu		
1977	Ahasin Polawata		
1977	Deviyani Oba Kohida?		
1978	Kumara Kumariyo		
1979	Hingaa Kolla		
1980	Siribo Aiya		
1980	Baddegama	Exorcist	
1984	Indiana Jones and the Temple of Doom	Shaman	
1984	Welle Thenu Maliga		
1988	Sandakada Pahana		
1992	Beyond Justice	El Mahadi	
1994	Ahas Maliga	posthumous release	
