= R. Muttusamy =

Sri Lankan musician

- Born: Ramaya Muttusamy; 5 January 1926; Nagercoil, Tamilnadu
- Died: 27 June 1988 (aged 62)
- Occupation: composer
- Spouse: Neeliya Perera
- Children: 4

Ramaya Muttusamy (5 January 1926 – 27 June 1988) was a prolific Indian Sri Lankan music director and singer. He handled the music for most of K. Gunaratnam's productions.

== Early life ==
Muttusamy was born on 5 January 1926, in Nagercoil, Tamil Nadu, India, the only son of virtuoso musician Ramaya Baghwather. At a young age, Muttusamy was introduced to the violin and mastered the instrument by the age of ten.

== Music career ==
Muttusamy worked as the assistant music director on the first Sinhalese film Kadawunu Poronduwa in 1941 under the tutelage of R. Narayana Iyer. He subsequently travelled to Sri Lanka and found work there as a member of the state-run Radio Ceylon's Tamil Orchestra (20 October 1952) and then with the Sundera Murugan Studio in Kandana built by producer Nayagam (1953).

Enlisted by successful producer K. Gunaratnam, Muttusamy handled his first lead music direction for the 1953 Sinhalese film Prema Tharangaya. In the film he directed the Sinhalese playback singers Dharmadasa and Latha Walpola on what would be their debut as well. Subsequently he oversaw the direction for over 225 films including Ahankara Sthree (1953), Mathalang (1955), Sandesaya (1961), Allapu Gedera and Chandiya (1965) working with playback singers like the Walpolas, Mohideen Baig, J. A. Milton Perera, H. R. Jothipala, Angeline Gunathilake, Sujatha Aththanayaka, G. S. B. Rani and Narada Disasekara.

He rejoined Radio Ceylon in 1958 and served with the organization until 1981.

== Singer ==
Muttusamy was a singer too. Madhura Yaame with Sujatha Perera (later Attanayake) in the film Sithaka Mahima was a popular rendition by him.

== Awards ==
Compiled from a newspaper article.

- Muttusamy was awarded an honorary Sri Lankan citizenship by prime minister Sir John Kotelawala (June 1956).
- A certificate for Best Music director, from the South Indian Journalists’ Association for his debut as film music director for the Sinhala film Prema Tharangaya
- Deepasikha award for composing music for the most number of movies (1974).
- The OCIC recognized and honoured him for his valuable contributions to Sinhala film music.
- Layagnana Vaaridhi awarded by the then Regional Development Minister C. Rajadurai (3 January 1987)

== Personal life ==
Muttusamy married the Sinhalese B. D. E. Neeliya Perera on 7 October 1961, and had four children, Mohanraj, Chitrangi, Prasanna Vadhani and Keerthika. Mohanraj would follow in his father's footsteps pursuing a career in music. Muttusamy died on 27 June 1988.
