= Gamperaliya (film) =

Gamperaliya (Changement au Village) ගම්පෙරලිය
- DVD Cover
- Directed by: Lester James Peries
- Written by: Regi Siriwardena
- Produced by: Anton Wickremasinghe
- Starring: Henry Jayasena; Punya Heendeniya; Wickrama Bogoda; Trilicia Gunawardena
- Cinematography: William Blake
- Edited by: Sumitra Gunawardana
- Music by: W.D. Amaradeva
- Distributed by: Cinelanka Ltd.
- Release date: 1963
- Running time: 108 minutes
- Country: Sri Lanka
- Language: Sinhala

Gamperaliya is a 1963 Sri Lankan drama film directed by Lester James Peries, with screenplay, dialogue and script by Reggie Siriwardena and Tissa Abeysekara; it was adapted from the novel Gamperaliya by Martin Wickramasinghe. The film stars an ensemble cast of several eras together including, Henry Jayasena, Punya Heendeniya, Wickrama Bogoda, Trilicia Gunawardena and Gamini Fonseka.

The film was internationally acclaimed, receiving the Golden Peacock (Best Film) at the 3rd International Film Festival of India and the Golden Head of Palenque in Mexico. The film won the Best Director and Best Film awards at the 1965 Sarasaviya Film Festival. It was entered into the 3rd Moscow International Film Festival. It was shown in Cannes Film festival in May 2008 under the French title Changement au village under section 'Restored Classics'. Subsequently it went out on general release in French cinemas. In 2001, the film was identified as a world heritage by Cinema Thek Institute (CTI) in France.

== Plot ==
Piyal (Henry Jayasena) is a handsome young teacher who is hired to teach English to Nanda (Punya Heendeniya), a member of an eminent family. They fall in love, but can not marry because Piyal is of a lower class. Nanda's parents instead push her into a marriage with Jinadasa (Gamini Fonseka), who is of the same class as them. With economic downturn in Sri Lanka, both families lose their status and Jinadasa leaves to try to make a better life for himself; he never achieves his goal and dies penniless. Piyal and Nanda can now finally come together. They have changed; the earlier idyllic nature of their relationship is not recaptured.

== Cast ==
Actor	Role
Henry Jayasena	Piyal
Punya Heendeniya	Nanda
Wickrama Bogoda	Tissa
Trilicia Gunawardena	Anula
Gamini Fonseka	Jinadasa
Shanthi Lekha	Nanda's mother
David Dharmakeerthi	Nanda's father
Tony Ranasinghe	Baladasa
Anula Karunathilaka	Laisa
Herbert Amarawickrama	Karolis
C. T. Fernando	Jamis
Eileen Sarathchandra	Piyal's mother
Mapa Gunaratne	Family doctor
G. W. Surendra	Vijay
Wijeratne Warakagoda	Rathnapura Doctor

== Production ==
Lester James Peries admired Martin Wickramsinghe's work and was inspired to attempt an adaption of Wickramasinghe's novel Gamperaliya into a movie in 1964. Wickremasinghe was initially reluctant thinking it wouldn't make a good movie, but eventually agreed. Scholar Regie Siriwardene was asked to script the film.

== Reception ==
Playwright Ediriweera Sarachchandra championed the film writing "At last a Sinhalese film has been made which we could show the world without having to hide our heads in shame. I want to say a great film has been made of a great novel." British director Lindsay Anderson hailed "its elegiac, near-Chekhovian grace."
