= Chandraratne Manawasinghe =

Sri Lankan poet and journalist (1913–1964)

Chandraratne Manawasinghe චන්ද්‍රරත්න මානවසිංහ
- Born: Chandraratne Dios Sooriyarachchi Mohotti; 19 June 1913; Beliatta, Sri Lanka
- Died: 4 September 1964 (aged 51); Colombo, Sri Lanka
- Other name: Puwakdandawe Sri Chandaratana
- Education: Puwakdandawe temple
- Occupations: Poet, Philosopher and writer
- Years active: 1935–1964
- Spouse: Srimathi Wasantha Kumari Hewakalugamage (m. 1944)
- Children: 7
- Parents: John Gerrad Sooriyarachchi Mohotti (father); Punchi Ethana Obadaarachchi (mother)

Chandraratne Dios Sooriyarachchi Mohotti (19 June 1913 – 4 September 1964 as Sinhala: චන්ද්‍රරත්න මානවසිංහ), popularly known as Chandraratne Manawasinghe, was a Sinhala scholar, poet, philosopher and writer. Considered one of the iconic poets in Sinhala poetry, Manawasinghe made several popular poems and songs in the short career that spanned three decades.

== Personal life ==
Manawasinghe was born 19 June 1913 in the village of Puwakdandawa in the Southern Province of Sri Lanka. His father John Gerrad Sooriyarachchi Mohotti alias Baddegama Hamu was a farmer. His mother Punchi Ethana Obadaarachchi was a housewife. He received his primary education at the Sri Pagnananda Buddhist Mixed School in Beliatta and was later ordained in 1924 at the Panchathuparamaya in Puwakdanda as Puwakdandawe Sri Chandaratana Thero. After that he lived in Kiravehera Rajamaha Viharaya where there was a conflict between the two parties over the ownership of Kiravehera. However, due to the crisis situation in the temple, he fled to the jungle and left the clergy. After returning to Dambulla from the jungle, he wandered to Colombo and from there to Negombo. He visited the Angurukaramulla Bodhirama in Negombo and was ordained as Puwakdandawe Sri Chandraratana Dhammaloka Tissa for the second time by the Chief Incumbent, Ven. Medhankara Thero of Negombo. He left the clergy once again.

He was married to Srimathi Wasantha Kumari Hewakalugamage on October 27, 1944. The couple has two sons: Udaya and Prabath, and five daughters: Daya Lakshmi, Manjula, Madhupani, Meepa and Kinkini.

He died on 4 September 1964 at the age of 51.

== Career ==
During his second time as a Buddhist monk at the age of 22, he started writing letters to 'Lakmini Pahana' in which the chief editor was Kumaratunga Munidasa. Meanwhile, he was remanded in custody for allegedly abusing the imperialists at a meeting. He later went to India to study Vanga (Bengali) and Hindi and Bharata culture. When he came to Sri Lanka he joined the editorial board of the then 'Heladiva' newspaper. After being released from clergy, he composed the play Dugi Hanga in 1947. He also wrote articles for the 'Heladiva' newspaper. Then he wrote a column called 'Charumanda' in "Hela Diva". On 27 October 1947, Lankadeepa newspaper was started for an auspicious time made by Manawasinghe. Then he was entrusted with the task of writing information on the astrology of Lankadeepa. In 1955, he started the column 'Waga Thuga' where he continued to work in Lankadeepa from 1947 to 1964.

He was also a prolific poet who used the words that are not commonly used by poets to express their ideas. Some of his popular songs and poems include: "Kusum Pipi Athu Pathare", "Valithara Athare Hemihita Basina", "Monawada Amme Akuru Jathiyak", "Somnasa Ho Santhapaya Hamuwe", "Guru gedarata yana athara maga" and "Jagan Mohini Madhura Bhashini".
