= Lester James Peries =

Sri Lankan film director (1919–2018)

Sri Lankabhimanya Lester James Peries
- ලෙස්ටර් ජේම්ස් පීරිස්
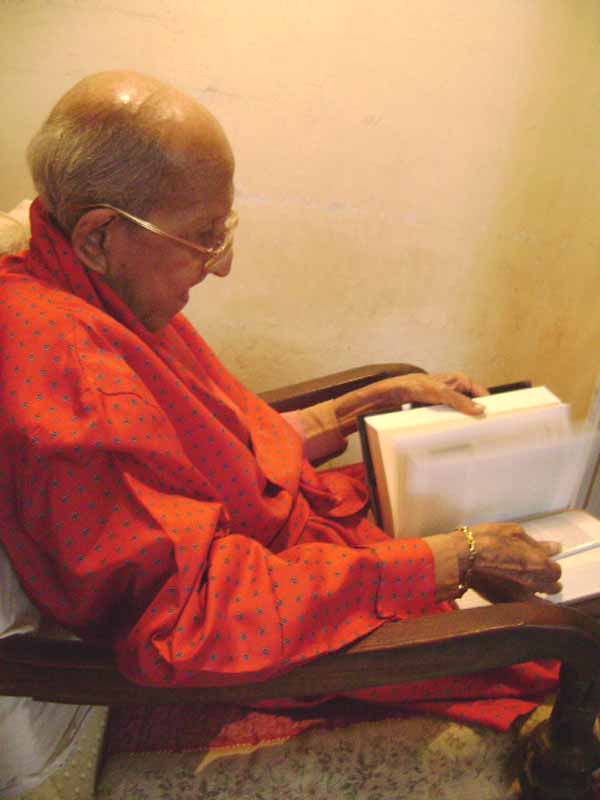
- Born: 5 April 1919; Dehiwela, British Ceylon
- Died: 28 April 2018 (aged 99); Colombo, Sri Lanka
- Occupations: Film director, Film producer and Screenwriter
- Years active: 1949–2006
- Spouse: Sumitra Peries (1964–2018; his death)
- Website: www.ljpspfoundation.org

Sri Lankabhimanya Lester James Peries (Sinhala: ශ්‍රී ලංකාභිමාන්‍ය ලෙස්ටර් ජේම්ස් පීරිස්; 5 April 1919 – 29 April 2018) was a Sri Lankan film director, screenwriter, and film producer. Considered as the father of Sri Lankan cinema, Lester worked as a filmmaker from 1949 to 2006, and was involved in over 28 films, including shorts and documentaries.

He received critical acclaim for directing Rekava, Gamperaliya, Nidhanaya, Golu Hadawatha, Kaliyugaya, Awaragira and Yuganthaya. His movie Wekande Walauwa, starring Ravindra Randeniya and Malini Fonseka, was Sri Lanka's first ever submission for the Academy Awards and the film Nidhanaya was included among the top 100 films of the century by the Cinémathèque Française. Peries' films often deal with Sri Lankan family life in rural settings and conflicted characters. He helped create an authentic expression of Sinhala Cinema.

== Early life ==
Lester James Peries was born on 5 April 1919 in Dehiwela, Colombo, Ceylon. His father, Dr. James Francis Peries, studied medicine in Scotland and was also a cricketer for a Scottish club. His mother, Ann Gertrude Winifred Jayasuria, was the first graduate of St. Bridget's Convent, Colombo. Peries had three siblings: Erica, Ivan and Noel.

The Peries family was a staunch Roman Catholic family that had become Anglicised. Growing up, Peries only spoke English at home and celebrated Christian traditions. His only link to Sinhala culture was his grandmother who always didn't trust Western medicine and spoke proper Sinhalese. At the age of eleven, Peries was given a 8mm Kodascope projector by his father as a gift, which ran Chaplin's silent movies. At that time, his only interest in films was when he and his brother Ivan would haunt the cinema to watch foreign film serials which ran day after day. Peries was never involved in school drama productions, and had no idea he was going to be a film director especially since British Ceylon did not have its own national film industry at that time.

He attended St Peter's College, one of the Catholic schools in Colombo, as a teenager before dropping out to pursue a career in journalism at the age of 17. He found his first work with the Daily News writing for the blue pages which was an arts supplementation. In 1939 he joined The Times of Ceylon working under Indian editor Frank Moraes. He also reviewed books on Radio Ceylon for a short period.

Peries' first real work with production came when he joined a theatre group called Drama Circle. This was a group of like minded individuals which regularly produced modern English plays. Here Peries was engaged in all aspects of the productions other than acting.

== Stay in England ==
In 1947, Peries travelled to England on his mother's advice to join his brother Ivan Peries who was there on an art scholarship. Moreas suggested writing a column from the country to be published in The Times which became "Letter on the Arts from England."

During that time, film-making was taking off in the UK with about 400 amateur film clubs around the country. In addition, Peries' passion for the cinema was developing and he met another Sri Lankan with similar interests, Hereward Jansz. The two youngsters decided to make a film together despite Hereward having his doubts about competing with established, well-funded clubs. They began with Peries writing the script and directing while Hereward did the filming with their limited camera equipment. Their first effort 'Soliloquy' (1949), a short film, won the Mini Cinema Cup for displaying the best technical proficiency. This work was followed by three other experimental films.

In 1952, the editor John Hockin told Peries of an interesting assignment he had for him – an interview with the new head of the Government Film Unit of Ceylon. At the end of the interview, the head of film unit Mr Keene inquired after Peries' own interest in making films. He knew about Peries' talent because he sat on one of the juries that presented the upcoming director with an amateur's award. Keene suggested that Peries return to Ceylon to embark on a career on film making.

Upon the return to Ceylon of producer Ralph Keene, Peries joined the Government Film Unit as Keene's assistant. Two major documentaries he helped Keene with were Heritage of Lanka and Nelungama. He also directed Conquest in the Dry Zone, a documentary on controlling malaria and Be Safe or Be Sorry, a witty study on errant motorists. At this time, a relative of Peries' suggested he start a company to produce Sinhala films. Peries left Government Film Unit in 1955 and created Chitra Lanka Limited to produce two films. Only one, Rekava, was ultimately produced. Peries' closest colleagues at the Government Film Unit, William Blake, a cameraman of Dutch descent, and Titus de Silva (Titus Thotawatte), an editor, resigned with him and later worked together on a number of films.

== Career ==
In 1956, Peries made his entry into national cinema with the globally acclaimed Rekava, which was a story based on village life. It was nominated for the Palme d'Or at the 1957 Cannes Film Festival. With this film he revolutionised Ceylonese cinema, giving it a unique identity. It was the first Ceylonese movie to be shot outdoors. Although it was acclaimed internationally it was not a commercial success. Afterward he made many award-winning films such as Gamperaliya in 1964 based on Martin Wickramasinghe's famous novel which received the Golden Peacock at the International Film Festival of India; "Delowak Athara" in 1966; "Golu Hadawatha" in 1968 based on the novel by Karunasena Jayalath; "Nidhanaya" in 1970 which was chosen as the best film of the first 50 years of Sri Lankan cinema and was included among the top 100 films of the century by the Cinémathèque Française; "Yuganthaya" in 1983; and Wekande Walauwa in 2002 which received the UNESCO Fellini award. He has directed over 28 feature films.

== Personal life ==
Peries met his wife, Sumitra, who is also a film director, in Paris at the home of a mutual friend and married in 1964 at All Saints Church in Borella. Peries' brother was artist Ivan Peries.

Peries died on 29 April 2018 at the age of 99.

== Filmography ==
As director
Year	Film	Cast	Language	Notes
1956	Rekava	Ananda Weerakoon, Somapala Dharmapriya, Myrtle Fernando	Sinhala	Sarasaviya Awards; Sarasaviya Awards Best Director
1960	Sandesaya	Ananda Jayaratne, Gamini Fonseka	Sinhala	
1963	Gamperaliya	Gamini Fonseka, Punya Heendeniya, Henry Jayasena, Tony Ranasinghe, Anula Karunatileke	Sinhala	Sarasaviya Best Director Award, entered into the 3rd Moscow International Film Festival. Won the Golden Peacock award at the International Film Festival of India 1965 Gamperaliya won "Golden Head of Palenque", Resena Mundial Film Festival in Acapulco, Mexico
1966	Delovak Athara	Tony Ranasinghe, Suwineetha Abeysekera, Iranganie Serasinghe	Sinhala	Sarasaviya Best Director Award
1967	Ran Salu	Tony Ranasinghe, Punya Heendeniya, Iranganie Serasinghe	Sinhala	
1968	Golu Hadawatha	Wickrema Bogoda, Anula Karunatileke	Sinhala	Sarasaviya Best Director Award
1969	Akkara Paha	Milton Jayawardena, Malini Fonseka	Sinhala	
1972	Nidhanaya	Gamini Fonseka, Malini Fonseka	Sinhala	Won Silver Lion of St Mark (Critics Choice) at the Venice International Film Festival and Screened a London Film Awards to mark 50 years of Sri Lankan cinema
1972	Desa Nisa	Joe Abeywickrema, Sriyani Amarasena, Ravindra Randeniya,	Sinhala	
1975	The God King	Leigh Lawson, Oliver Tobias, Ravindra Randeniya, Geoffrey Russell	English	
1976	Madol Duwa	Ajith Jinadasa, Padmasena Athukorala, Joe Abeywickrema	Sinhala	Based on Sri Lankan famous novel
1978	Ahasin Polawata	Tony Ranasinghe, Sriyani Amarasena, Vijaya Kumaranatunga, Vasanthi Chathurani	Sinhala	Sri Lanka's Presidential Award for Best Director
1979	Pinhami	Darshana Panangala, Joe Abeywickrama	Sinhala	First Prize at the Moscow International Children's Film Festival
1979	Veera Puran Appu	Ravindra Randeniya, Malini Fonseka, Joe Abeywickrema, Sriyani Amarasena	Sinhala	
1980	Baddegama	Joe Abeywickrama, Malini Fonseka, Vijaya Kumaranatunga, Henry Jayasena, Tony Ranasinghe	Sinhala	Diploma at the Cannes International Film Festival
1982	Kaliyugaya	Henry Jayasena, Punya Heendeniya	Sinhala	Screened at Cannes Film Festival
1983	Yuganthaya	Gamini Fonseka, Richard De Zoysa, Ramani Bartholomeusz	Sinhala	Sri Lanka's Presidential Award for Best Director. Entered into the 14th Moscow International Film Festival.
1995	Awaragira	Joe Abeywickrama, Vasanthi Chathurani, Kamal Addararachchi, Ranjan Ramanayake, Lucky Dias	Sinhala	
2002	Wekande Walauwa	Ravindra Randeniya, Malini Fonseka, Vasanthi Chathurani, Sanath Gunathilake, Iranganie Serasinghe, Paboda Sandeepani	Sinhala	Sri Lanka's first submission for Academy Awards. UNESCO felini award
2006	Ammawarune	Malini Fonseka, Thesara Jayawardane, Roshan Pilapitiya, Sanath Gunathilake, Tissa Abeysekara, Douglas Ranasinghe	Sinhala	

== Short films ==
- Be Safe or Be Sorry-16 min, 1955
- Conquest in the dry Zone-14 min, 1954
- Soliloquy-12 min, 1951
- Farewell to Childhood-14 min, 1950
- A Sinhalese Dance-08 min, 1950

== Awards and recognition ==
- Cannes International Film Festival– "Fellini Gold Medal" Awarded by Unesco for outstanding film career 2003.
- Sri Lankabhimanya The highest Civil Honour of Sri Lanka (2007).
- Recipient of the Lifetime Achievement Award at the 31st International Film Festival of India (2000)
- Commandeur (commander) in the Ordre des Arts et des Lettres (Order of Arts and Letters) from the French government (1997)
- Diploma of Honour Venice Film Festival for the film "Conquest in the Dry Zone" (1954)
- The Mini Cinema Cup for the short film "Soliloquy" for displaying the best technical proficiency by the Institute of Amateur and Experimental Film Makers Festival -Great Britain (1951)
- Amateur Cine World Silver Plaque for the experimental film "Farewell to Childhood" – ten best films of the year – Great Britain (1950)
- Issue of a National Stamp dedicated to Lester on 5 April 2002
- A hybrid orchid was named after Dr Lester James Peries on 11 March 2004 – Ascocenda Lester Peries
- April 5 was named as "National Artist Day".

== The Lester James Peries and Sumitra Peries Foundation ==
The Lester James Peries and Sumitra Peries Foundation was inaugurated on 9 June 2011 at the BMICH with an oration by the chief Guest - celebrated Indian film maker Padma Vibushan Dr. Adoor Gopalakrishnan and the Speaker of Parliament Chamal Rajapakse was the Guest of Honour. The Foundation is incorporated through an act of Parliament of the Democratic Socialist Republic of Sri Lanka. The bill of incorporation was forwarded to parliament by Hon. Malini Fonseka on 5 January 2011. The foundation focuses on the following general objectives-

1. To provide assistance for the development, promotion and sustenance of the Sri Lankan cinema and to those associated with it;
2. To promote and foster cinema and related arts and crafts for children and young adults;
3. To promote, improve, develop, provide financial assistance and maintain academic, scientific, cultural, literary, artistic and physical abilities and aptitudes;
4. To promote, propagate and foster humanitarian ideals, democratic and pluralistic values, good citizenship, patriotic concepts and beliefs;
5. To improve, develop, create, foster and maintain talents and abilities in entrepreneurship, research and training in business, technology and management and concept of income generating and self-employment ventures and enterprises; to establish, improve, encourage, develop and maintain research and research facilities in scientific, cultural, educational, economic and all other aspects of human development;
6. To advise and assist the Government, NGOs and individuals in the furtherance of the objectives of the Foundation;
7. To preserve and promote all cinematographic and any other creations of Lester James Peries and Sumitra Peries made by them including scripts, manuscripts, books, letters, articles, poems, photographs, audio cassettes, VHS cassettes, CDs, VCDs, DVDs, MP3s and any other audio devices, visual devices and media;
8. To preserve all cinematic equipment and personal memorabilia owned and used by Lester James Peries and Sumitra Peries;
9. To maintain Archives to promote and preserve all cinematographic and any other creations of any Sri Lankan film maker;
10. To grant prizes, rewards, awards or scholarship to develop, promote and encourage creative talents in general or in particular fields;
11. To organize, conduct and participate in seminars, meetings, workshops, discussions, talks, classes, films, film shows, demonstrations, sports, and recreational activities, and to write, print and publish books, periodicals, magazines, articles and newspapers, in furtherance of the objectives herein specified and specifically in all areas of educational activity;
12. To establish and maintain libraries, workshops and readings rooms, and to equip the same having regard to the primary objects of the Foundation;
13. To publish articles, periodicals or such other literature and information as may prove necessary or useful for the purpose of the Foundation;
14. To undertake and execute any trusts the undertaking whereof seems desirable and either gratuitously or otherwise.

The Foundation operates from Peries' residence and is involved in organizing many events annually to promote the film industry of the past and present in Sri Lanka.

The Foundation is spearheaded by its trustees- Dr. Lester James Peries, Mrs. Sumitra Peries, Mr. Yadamini Gunawardena, Mr. Kumar de Silva and Mrs. Gayathri Mustachi. Also on the board of directors serves Ms. Yashodha Wimaladharma, Mr. Sameera Manabharana Randeniya, Mr. Yasoja Gunawardena and Mr. Nuran Gomez.

== The "Lester James Peries Film Archive" ==
The most recent development on Dr. Lester James Peries is the building of a film archive in his name. From the time he was a young film maker one of his only requests was that the government make way for a proper film archive that would help protect the heritage of the films produced by Sri Lanka. On 5 April 2014, his own milestone 95th birthday, his request was granted when the National film corporation ceremoniously opened the "Lester James Peries Film Archives" at the request of President Mahinda Rajapakse. The event was followed by a photographic exhibition of Dr. Peries' life and works.

== Literature and records ==
Peries has written approximately twenty books. The most-well known of them are LJP Life and Works (Prof. A. J. Gunawardene), Lester by Lester (as told to Kumar de Silva) and Lester (Prof. Sunil Ariyaratne).

A music CD was produced by The Lester James Peries and Sumitra Peries Foundation containing 21 songs from Peries' films.

Some of Peries' films have been restored and placed in DVD format.

== See also ==
- Sumitra Peries
- Ivan Peries
