= List of Sri Lankan poets =

The following is an alphabetical list of Sri Lankan poets.

== A ==
- Karunaratne Abeysekera
- Padikara Muhandiram Don Pedris Francis Abeywickrama
- Arisen Ahubudu
- Gunadasa Amarasekara
- Jean Arasanayagam
- M. H. M. Ashraff

== B ==
- Chandrarathna Bandara

== F ==
- Basil Fernando

== G ==
- Siri Gunasinghe
- Gurulugomi

== I ==
- Eric Illayapparachchi

== J ==
- Marcelline Jayakody

== K ==
- Piyasena Kahandagamage
- Sirilal Kodikara
- Parakrama Kodituwakku
- H. M. Kudaligama
- Wimalaratne Kumaragama

== M ==
- S. Mahinda
- Sri Chandraratne Manawasinghe
- Carl Muller
- Kumaratunga Munidasa
- Mahagama Sekara
- Mahinda Prasad Masimbula

== N ==
- Gajaman Nona
- Nethuka Damviru Rathnyaka

== P ==
- Sagara Palansuriya
- Vicumpriya Perera
- Eelattu Poothanthevanar
- Meemana Premathilake

== R ==
- Thotagamuwe Sri Rahula Thera
- Monica Ruwanpathirana

== S ==
- Ediriweera Sarachchandra
- Mahagama Sekera
- G. B. Senanayake
- P. K. D. Seneviratne
- Lakdhas Wikkrama Sinha
- Denagama Siriwardena
- Regi Siriwardena
- Richard Lionel Spittel

== T ==
- Saman Tilakasiri
- Thotagamuwe Sri Rahula Thero

== V ==
- Vivimarie Vanderpoorten

== W ==
- Asoka Weerasinghe
- Nancy Wijekoon
- Nissanka Wijeyeratne
