= Sri Lankan literature =

Sri Lankan literature is the literary tradition of Sri Lanka. The largest part of Sri Lankan literature was written in the Sinhala language, but there is a considerable number of works in other languages used in Sri Lanka over the millennia (including Tamil, Pāli, and English). However, the languages used in ancient times were very different from the language used in Sri Lanka now.

Up to the present, short stories are a very important part of Sri Lankan literature; the output of Sinhalese short story writers has elicited a greater measure of critical analysis.

== List of writers ==
=== Sinhala writers ===
- Gunadasa Amarasekara
- Chandraratna Bandara
- Sugathapala de Silva
- Siri Gunasinghe
- Eric Illayapparachchi
- P.B Jayasekara
- K. Jayatillake
- Piyasena Kahandagamage
- Sirilal Kodikara
- Munidasa Kumaratunga
- Sunanda Mahendra
- Simon Navagattegama
- Mahanama Rajapaksha (Maya Ranjan)
- Ediriweera Sarachchandra
- Mahagama Sekara
- G. B. Senanayake
- W. A. Silva
- Sybil Wettasinghe
- Martin Wickramasinghe

=== Sinhala poets ===
- Eric Illayapparachchi
- Gunadasa Amarasekara
- Gurulugomi
- H. M. Kudaligama
- Kumaratunga Munidasa
- Lucien Bulathsinhala
- Mahagama Sekara
- Meemana Premathilake
- Parakrama Kodituwakku
- P. K. D. Seneviratne
- S. Mahinda Thero
- Sagara Palansuriya
- Saman Tilakasiri
- Siri Gunasinghe
- Sunil Ariyaratne
- Thotagamuwe Sri Rahula Thera
- Wimalaratne Kumaragama

=== Essayists and non-fiction writers ===
- Martin Wickramasinghe
- Ediriweera Sarachchandra
- Gunadasa Amarasekara
- Nalin de Silva
- Piyaseeli Wijegunasinghe
- Shelton Payagala
- Sucharitha Gamlath
- J B Disanayake

=== Sinhala playwrights ===
- John de Silva
- Ediriweera Sarachchandra
- Sugathapala de Silva
- Sunanda Mahendra
- Simon Navagattegama
- Dayananda Gunawardena
- Henry Jayasena
- Dhamma Jagoda
- Namel Weeramuni

=== Sinhala radio play writers ===
- Sugathapala de Silva
- Malaka Dewapriya
- Dayananda Gunawardena
- Tilak Jayaratne
- Sirilal Kodikara
- Sunanda Mahendra
- Dharma Sri Munasinghe
- Simon Navagattegama
- Dharmasena Pathiraja
- Jayalal Rohana

=== Tamil authors ===
- Eelattu Poothanthevanar
- Muhammed Cassim Siddi Lebbe

=== Tamil poets ===
- Neelaavanan
- Pottuvil Asmin

=== Sri Lankan and Sri Lankan diaspora authors who write in English ===
- Michael Ondaatje
- Shehan Karunatilaka
- Anuk Arudpragasam
- Andrew Fidel Fernando
- Christopher Ondaatje
- Nira Wickramasinghe
- Jayadeva Uyangoda
- Romesh Gunesekera
- Shyam Selvadurai
- S. J. Sindu
- Nayomi Munaweera
- Sunil Yapa
- Tissa Abeysekara
- Regi Siriwardena
- Jean Arasanayagam
- Rajiva Wijesinha
- Nihal De Silva
- V. V. Ganeshananthan
- Ru Freeman
- David Blacker
- Punyakante Wijenaike
- Roshi Fernando
- Jessie Alice Goonetileke
- Gananath Obeyesekere

== See also ==
- Sri Lankan culture
- Henry Parker, a British engineer who studied and compiled the oral literature of Sri Lanka
