= List of Sri Lankan writers =

The following is a list of Sri Lankan writers of all types.

== Novelists ==
- Tissa Abeysekera
- Nihal De Silva
- Chitra Fernando
- Vijita Fernando
- Romesh Gunesekera
- Indrani Karunarathne
- Shehan Karunatilaka
- Carl Muller
- Michael Ondaatje
- Denagama Siriwardena
- W. A. Silva
- Vivimarie Vanderpoorten
- Sybil Wettasinghe
- Martin Wickramasinghe
- Punyakante Wijenaike
- Rajiva Wijesinha
- Thilak Senasinghe
- M.C. Siddi Lebbe
- G. B. Senanayake
- Sugathapala De Silva
- Mahagama Sekara
- Simon Navagattegama
- Dominic Jeeva
- Ediriweera Sarachchandra
- K. Jayatillake
- Thisara Kumarapeli Arachchi

== Non-fiction ==
- S. H. M. Jameel
- Malaka Dewapriya
