= List of Dharmaraja College alumni =

This is a list of Old Rajans, they being the alumni of Dharmaraja College, Kandy, Sri Lanka.

Name	Notability	Reference
Dimuthu Bandara Abayakoon	Member of Parliament (Kandy District) (2001 – 2010)	
Nalin Angammana †	Lieutenant General / GOC, 3rd Division Sri Lanka Engineers	
Chandrarathna Bandara	Author	
Prasanna Chandrasekera	Major General/Master-General of the Ordnance at Sri Lanka Army	
J. B. Disanayake	Linguistics professor; author	
Lalith Dissanayake	Member of Parliament (Kegalle District) (2008 – 2015)	
Sarath Dissanayake	Rear Admiral	
T. B. Dissanayake	President's Counsel; Commissioner of Assizes (1969 – 1970)	
Harsha Suranga Fernando	Physician, politician, 18th governor of the Central Province (2026–present)	
C. A. S. Marikkar	Member of Parliament 1952, 1957 1960. Minister for Post, Broadcasting and Communication.	
William Gopallawa MBE	President of Sri Lanka (1972 – 1978); Governor-General of Ceylon (1962 – 1972)	
A. Ekanayake Gunasinha	Mayor of Colombo (1940 – 1943); Member of Parliament (Colombo Central District) (1947 – 1952)	
Ananda W. P. Guruge	Buddhist scholar; author	
Pujith Jayasundara	Inspector General of Police (2016 – 2020)	
Amarasiri Kalansuriya	Legendary Film Actor (Most Popular Actor in 70s & 80s)	
Chamara Kapugedera	International test cricketer (2006 – 2009)	
W. S. Karunaratne	Buddhist scholar	
T. B. Kehelgamuwa	First-class cricketer	
Wimalaratne Kumaragama	Poet	
Sunanda Mahendra	Author; poet	
Dharma Sri Munasinghe	Playwright; screenwriter; director	
Keerthi Pasquel	Singer	
Dharmasena Pathiraja	Film director; screenwriter	
Sudarshana Pathirana	commander of the Sri Lankan Airforce (2020-2023)	
Roshan Pilapitiya	Actor; producer	
Tilak Ratnayake	Governor of Uva Province (1990 – 1993)	
Godwin Samararatne	Meditation instructor	
Anuradha Seneviratna	Linguistics professor; author	
Sir Bennet Soysa	Member of the State Council; Member of the Senate of Ceylon; Mayor of Kandy	
Janaka Bandara Tennakoon	Member of Parliament (Matale District) (1994 – present)	
Heshan Unamboowe	Olympic swimmer	
Sandun Weerakkody	International test cricketer	
Eric Prasanna Weerawardena	Member of Parliament (Kandy District) (2010 – present)	
Stanley Wijesundera	Vice Chancellor, University of Colombo (1979 – 1989)	
Dayan Witharana	Singer	
K. D. K. Dharmawardena	Lyricist; radio broadcaster	

== See also ==
- Dharmaraja College
