= Kodikara =

Kodikara is a Sinhalese surname. Notable people with the surname include:

- Sirilal Kodikara (born 1924), Sinhalese novelist, poet, journalist, and radio play writer
- Thusara Kodikara (born 1969), Malaysian international cricketer

== See also ==
- Kodakara
