= Ramya Jirasinghe =

Sri Lankan novelist

Ramya Chamalie Jirasinghe (Sinhala: රම්‍යා ජිරසිංහ) is a Sri Lankan novelist and poet. She was shortlisted as one of the finalists of the 31st Gratiaen Prize nominations for the year 2023 which she eventually won.

== Career ==
In 2009, she was honored with joint runners-up prize for having submitted a thought-provoking opening paragraph of a fictional novel titled The Letting Go. It was revealed that she submitted the paragraph after learning about a British newspaper advertisement displayed by The Guardian, which insisted that there would be an outright contender to win the Orange Prize award.

In June 2024, she was adjudged as the winner of Gratiaen Prize for the year 2023 in recognition for her debut novel titled Father Cabraal’s Recipe for Love Cake. Her literary work Father Cabraal’s Recipe for Love Cake is yet to be published for public view and it eventually garnered attention from prominent writers who declared it as the best literary work by some distance. Her debut novel focuses on the topic surrounding around the plight of slavery in South Asia, experience of African individuals and Arabian traders during colonial era.

She was also previously shortlisted for covered prestigious Gratiaen Prize in 1998 and 2007. She was also crowned as the winner of Youth Poetry Award of the National Youth Council of Sri Lanka in 1992. She also won the English Writers Cooperative's Poetry Competition in 1997. She also received the State Literary Award for Poetry in 2011 which she shared with Vivimarie Vanderpoorten. She won the 2011 State Literary Award for her work There's an Island in the Bone. She also worked with contemporary artist Anoma Wijewardene on notable exhibitions such as Deliverance and EarthLines in 2012 and 2016 respectively.
