= Chandrarathna Bandara =

Sri Lankan writer

- Education: Dharmaraja College, Kandy
- Occupation: Novelist
- Writing career
- Period: 1982-present
- Notable works: Meru, Wanasapumala
- Notable awards: National Literary Award; D. R. Wijewardena Memorial Award
- Website: chandrarathnabandara.com

Chandrarathna Bandara is a prominent novelist in Sri Lanka who won the National Literary award for his work in 1991. His passion during his earlier work was to investigate the social, cultural and political dimensions of Sri Lanka. He went to Dharmaraja College, Kandy.

== Literary career ==
He won the National Literary award for his novel Meru in the State Literary Festival in Sri Lanka in 1991. His most discussed work so far Wanasapumala (Hostage City) came out in 1993. It dealt with the complicated issues faced by a politically motivated young man in the Northern Province of Sri Lanka in 1980s. The narrative method of his work can be characterized as a re-creation of the style introduced in the 60's by such stalwarts as Gunadasa Amarasekara and Siri Gunasinghe.

Wanasapumala won the D. R. Wijewardena Award for the Best novel in 1993. This book has already been translated to English (Hostage City) by Vijitha Fernando and to Tamil (Udayagal Pukkal) by S.Sivagurunathan, under the patronage of "Canada-Sri Lanka Education Foundation". Vijitha Fernando is one of the most senior translators in Sri Lanka and won the Best Translator National Award for her works in 2004 and 2005 years.

A tele-drama was also made in Sri Lanka based on his novel Wiman Dorakoda in the latter part of 1990s and serialized in national television, Sri Lanka Rupavahini Corporation. Chandrarathna Bandara is also an acclaimed Short story writer and Poet, known for his unorthodox style in the latter.

His 5th novel "Walakulu Bamma" (Wall of Clouds), published by Sarasavi Publishers - Sri Lanka, was launched in Toronto on 3 April 2016. Key Talk was delivered by Dr. Jayalath Manorathne.

== Bibliography ==
=== Novels ===
- Meru (The winged Ants)
- Wanasapumala (The Wild Champaka Flower)
- Hostage City
- Udayagal Pukkal
- Viman Dorakada (The Entrance of the Mansion)
- Premanishansa

=== Short story collections ===
- Kenimandala Ginigath da (The Day the Roof caught fire)
- Stupaya Binda Vetima (The downfall of the Dagoba)
- Lenadora Pipuna Premaya

=== Poetry ===
- Salithe (The Shaken)
- Asikkitayage Sihinaya (The Dream of the Vulgar Fellow)
- Mara Ranganaya (The Dance of Death)
- Dumbara Latoniya (The Lamentation of Dumbara)
- Ketakirilli

== See also ==
- Sri Lankan literature
