= Eric Prasanna Weerawardhana =

Sri Lankan politician (born 1983)

Hon. Eric Prasanna Weerawardhana

Member of Parliament for Kandy District
- In office 2010–2015

Personal details
- Born: 25 June 1983 (age 43)
- Party: National People's Power (after 2022)
- Other political affiliations: Sri Lanka Freedom Party (before 2022)
- Parent: Ediriweera Weerawardhana (father)
- Education: Dharmaraja College

Eric Prasanna Weerawardhana MP (born 5 May 1983) is a Sri Lankan politician, a member of the Parliament of Sri Lanka. He belongs to the National People's Power.

== See also ==
- List of Dharmaraja College alumni
