= Eric Illayapparachchi =

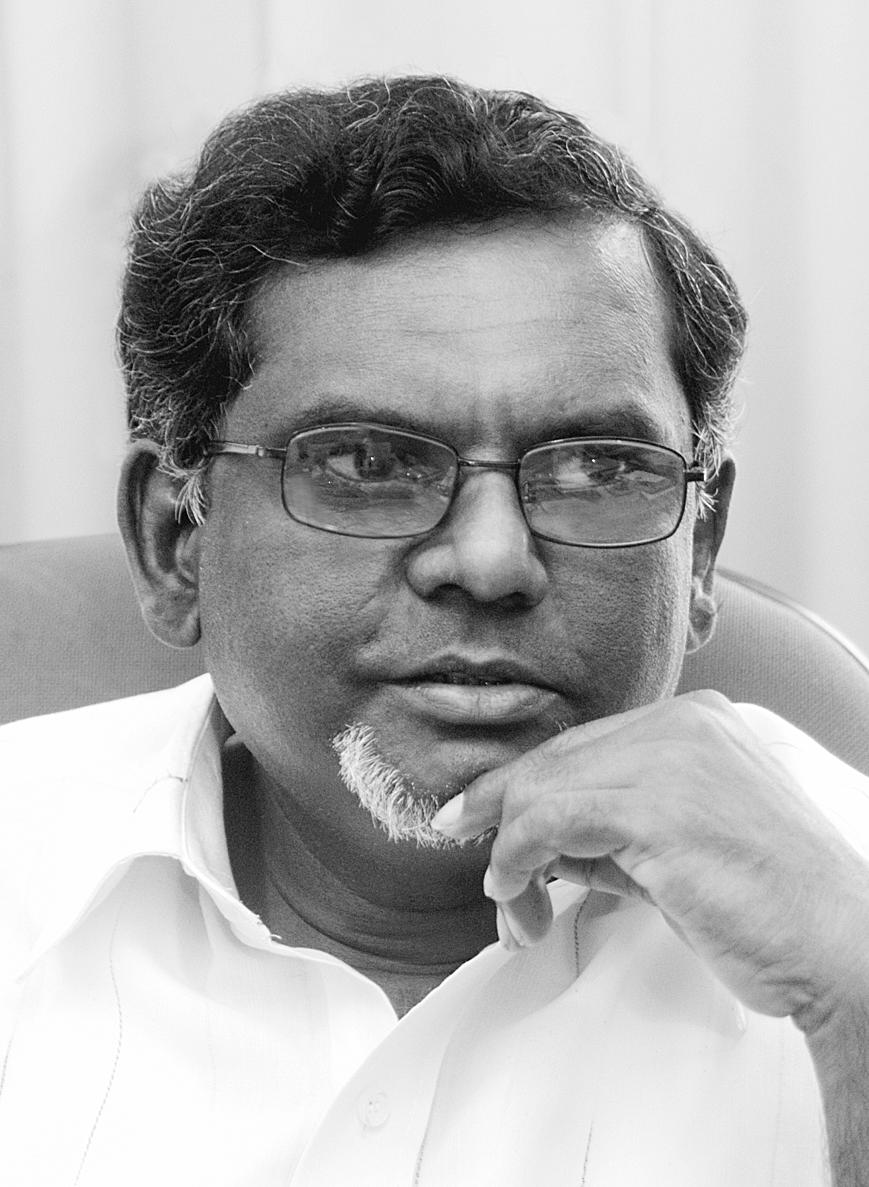
Eric Illayapparachchi

Eric Illayapparachchi (born 16 December 1954) is a Sinhalese writer and poet. He wrote the libretto for Agni, an opera composed by Premasiri Khemadasa which had its premiere on 26 May 2007 in Colombo. One of his short stories was made into a television drama for the series Vinividimi Adura (Through the Darkness) on Sri Lanka's ITN network. Another of his short stories appears in an anthology of Sri Lankan stories in English translation (Ashley Helpe (ed.), A Lankan Mosaic, Three Wheeler Press).

== Books ==
Novels
Bagandara
Vithanda Samaya
Adaraye Simenthi
Lalitha Samaya
Paada Yaathraa
Paradesi
Rathu Palasa
Petha

Short stories
Wadadiya
Mal nathi uyana
Lanka Gamana
Awanaduwaka Satahan
Kylasha Kutaya
Minis Wataya
China Towma

Biographies
Premasiri Khemadasa, Critical Biography

Anthology of Poems
Madiyama Geethaya
Alindaya
Siduhathga Agamahasiya
Wesathur Sirithak
Mage Kolabata HadaPayai
Kisiwek Kaviyan Nomarathi
Piththala Handiya
Sucharitha Siritha

Books on aesthetics
Chithra Kalawa ha Vicharaya(Painting and Criticism)
Chithra Kala Siyapatha(on Renaissance Art)
Chithra Kalawa Sawwandiya(On Modernism)
Kalathmaka Chanaya Saba Lokaya(On Critical Theory and Narratology)
Vichara Pathrika(On Critical Theory, Semiology and Narratology)
Khemadasa
Lankaya Samajaya, Khemadasa Sangeethaya, Agni Operawa (with Rohan Perera)(Deleuzean Analysis on the musicology of Khemadasa)
Opera Vinisa

Other
Mee Pani saha Alu(Honey and Ashes)on theories of Roland Barthes
Miss Lanka (Stage Drama Script)
Agni (Libretto)

== See also ==
- Sri Lankan literature

== Sources ==
- Ajith Samaranayake, "The dark face of the new left", Sunday Observer (Sri Lanka), 23 January 2005.
- Aravinda, "Caliban's mirror ", Daily News (Sri Lanka), 3 October 2001.
- Chamikara Weerasinghe, "Fire on stage in opera", The Daily News (Sri Lanka), 25 May 2007.
- Susitha R. Fernando, 'Vinividimi Andura' To enlighten Lankan teledrama, The Sunday Times (Sri Lanka), 18 February 2007.
- K. S. Sivakumaran, "A Lankan mosaic", The Daily News (Sri Lanka), 31 December 2003.
- Malini Govinnage, "Memorable literary discourses" (review of Sahitha Samaja Prathiroopa by Sashi Prabhath Ranasinghe, profiles of 20 prominent literary figures in Sri Lanka, including Eric Illayapparachchi), The Daily News (Sri Lanka), 30 June 2004.
