= Agni (opera) =

Opera by Premasiri Khemadasa

Agni ("Fire") is an opera in Sinhalese composed by Premasiri Khemadasa with a libretto by Eric Illayapparachchi. It premiered on 26 May 2007 at the Lionel Wendt Theater in Colombo, Sri Lanka.

== Composition ==
Seventeen singers trained by Premasiri Khemadasa at his musical academy located at the suburban Folk Art Center, Palawaththa, Battaramulla, performed with an orchestra consisting of two keyboards, flutes, an esraj, guitars, drums, a timpani, a gong and strings. Khemadasa conducted the orchestra.

The opera was the culmination of a period of one year strenuous training undergone by young talents selected by Khemadasa. Although Maestro Khemadasa was energetic enough to inspire them with his philosophy of music, he had been subject to several surgeries, one a kidney transplant. Sometimes he ignored medical advice and rehearsed his players from morning to evening. On rehearsing of the opera, a journalist from the Daily News (Sri Lanka) wrote:

In Tune (an art column) met the master composer Khemadasa at Janakala Kendraya (Folk Art Center) last Tuesday (17th May 2007) for an interview on his new opera. In fact I was expecting to meet a fatigued composer since he had been subject to a couple of surgeries recently, one a kidney surgery, and the other a heart surgery. On the other hand he has been training the students for months but there appeared a much relaxed Khemadasa with a gleaming smile. He asked me to wait at the hall where the girls were still rehearsing till he got back quickly. The fanciful flights of the composer's pen was there to be experienced live with singing and dancing of the girls. Khemadasa arrived with his usual swiftness and sat on the plastic chair which was behind his keyboard in the room "These girls have been practicing from 8.00 a.m. and their dedication has been unbelievable for the opera .″ he said in admiration. I asked him, what I had just seen and heard. "You have just experienced the power of their voices and bodily movements harmonizing with the musical texture. This was no recording" he went on.

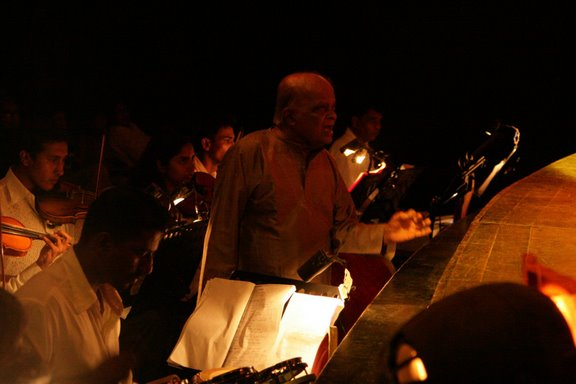
Khemadasa Conducts Agni

The opera was produced amidst many difficulties as there was little space for an art work of this nature in the country. No patronage was extended from either private sector entrepreneurs or from the media. Socialist Art Society came forward to encourage Khemadasa to initiate a serious art work. Thus the SAS supported rehearsals and organized performances.

Five years ago, in the convocation address when he was honored with a Doctorate by the University of Ruhuna, Khemadasa observed that the Sri Lankan music has been developed into a polyphony and it was high time that Sri Lanka bid farewell to understand music.

He continues:

Even handful of those who are considered men of letters, when they talk at least occasionally about music focus on songs and not about music per se.

He told The Nation when he was making Agni as a feast for the senses:

Agni is very different from a Western opera. Operas are always written in Italian language. People watch them to listen to its music. But the local audience is not familiar with the 'real' Western opera. The music of Agni is a blend of the Western, Eastern and folk. Agni is an original opera, and opera of our own kind, for our people."

The Nation further said that for the composer and his talented troupe of players, Agni had been a long drawn process.He told the Nation after his latest production's immense success.

You get so many body lines in this opera. The movements were choreographed in order to support the singing. Because it was tailored to a local audience, more movements were included."

== Reception ==
With the premiere in the full housed Lionel Wendt, the opera won national respect: proof that the country needed serious music. Number of performances amounted to twenty seven within two years. Well known film director Lester James Peries and his wife were also in the audience of the premier. Professor Sucharitha Gamlath, a classical scholar and a Marxist critic said that the opera was a musical miracle. Since its premier the opera has always been the most beloved contemporary work kvvof art in the country and even after the celebration of its second anniversary, there were several requests for future performances.

Performances organized since the premier throughout the country were many and it could be recorded as unprecedented for a sophisticated musical drama.

Date	Location
26 May 2007	Lionel Wendt, Colombo
27 May 2007	Lionel Wendt, Colombo
29 June 2007	Lionel Wendt, Colombo
8 July 2007	Town Hall, Negombo
24 July 2007	Lionel Wendt, Colombo
4 August 2007	Lionel Wendt, Colombo
30 September 2007	Town Hall, Panadura (staged twice)
9 October 2007	Lionel Wendt
19 October 2007	Sudasuna Hall, Chilaw (staged twice)
28 November 2007	Youth Council Hall. Anuradapura (staged twice)
25 January 2008	Lionel Wendt, Colombo
14 February 2008	University of Kelaniya
24 February 2008	Town Hall, Bandarawela
9 March 2008	Niwala Hall, Gampaha
26 May 2008	Mini Theatre, Borella (workshop & musical evening to mark the first anniversary)
23 August 2008	Dharmaraja College, Kandy
7 December 2008	Lionel Wendt (first posthumous performance)
24 May 2009	Town Hall, Negombo (staged twice)(second anniversary)

== Background ==
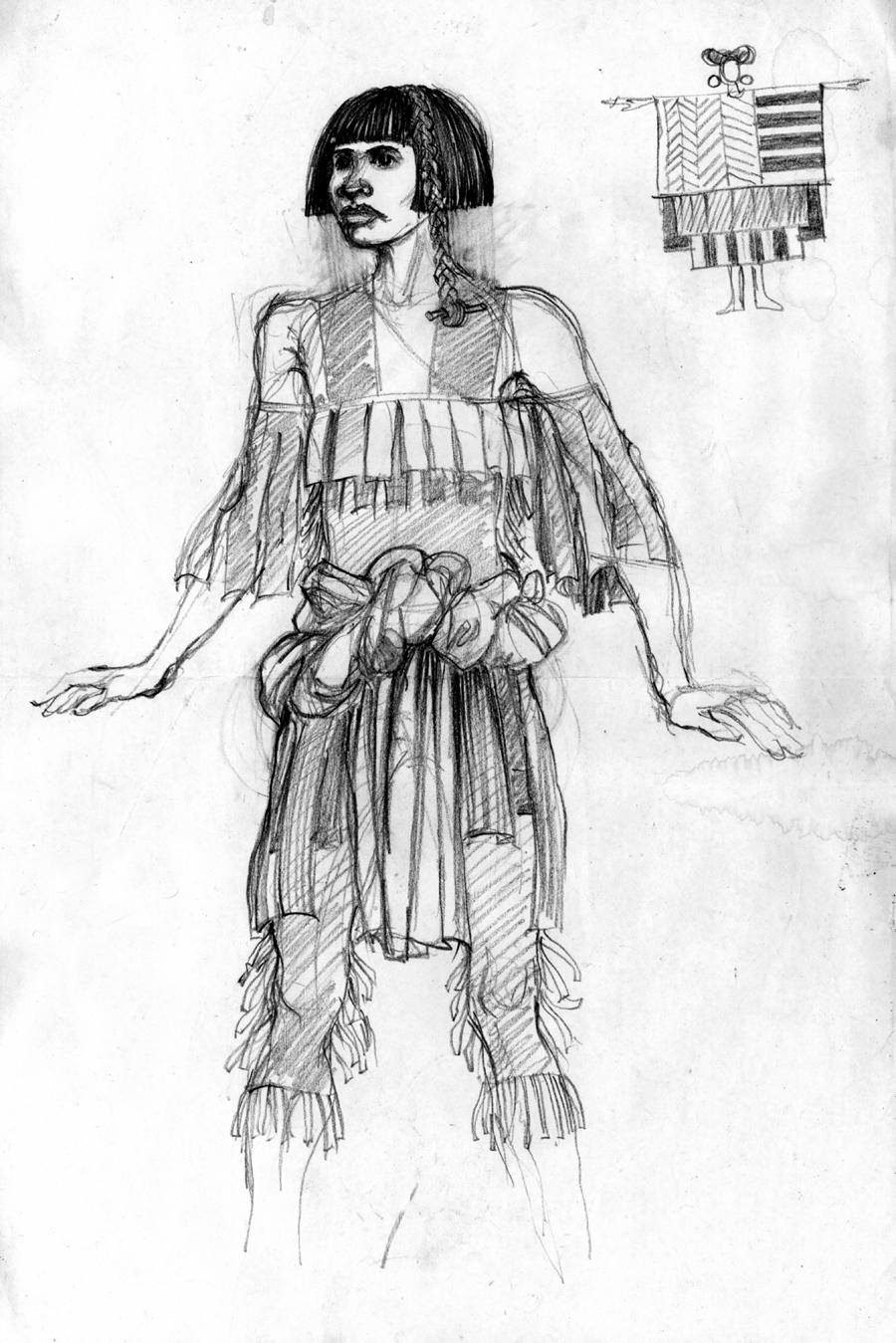
The White Boy (messenger)

The opera was the culmination of the four-decade-long musical career of Premasiri Khemadasa and his lifelong goal for localizing the opera by making it acceptable to the sensibilities of the Monsoon Asia. Because of his innovative approaches to music and his refusal to follow the (rules of) Indian Classical Music, he has been criticized as well as admired. Operas would be unheard of for the most of Sri Lankans if Khemadasa had not tried to introduce it to Sri Lanka with several experimental works before producing this opera. After several of those attempts, he found an audience for his music. It is a Sinhala-language opera like Wagner's Parsifal is a German-language opera and Verdi's Othello is an Italian one.

Agni is noted for its prominent Oriental and Western mythological elements. While the Greek influence is visible over the character of Ginipathi (Lord/God of Fire), the influence of the Pathini cult is visible over the fire goddess, the sister of the former. Brilliantly linked oriental and western imagery are woven into the musical and lyrical framework of the opera. In the story of goddess Pathini, there are many references to fire. Pathini is one of the four guardian deities of Sri Lanka. Paththini protects people from calamities. Poems pertaining to the cult of Pathini are sung in the Pathini temples. She burnt the city of Pandya King, Madurai by her left breast torn apart to avenge the treachery, committed against her innocent husband. Further Agni was the God of Fire and Fire worship was widely practiced in the ancient Asia including Babylon, Egypt and India. Prometheus is a central figure in Greek mythology. Thus a dialogue between myths of the East and the West are written in the story of opera and it supports the fusion of Eastern and Western traditions of music. In this opera, the mythology supports musicology and indigenous literary traditions supports music.

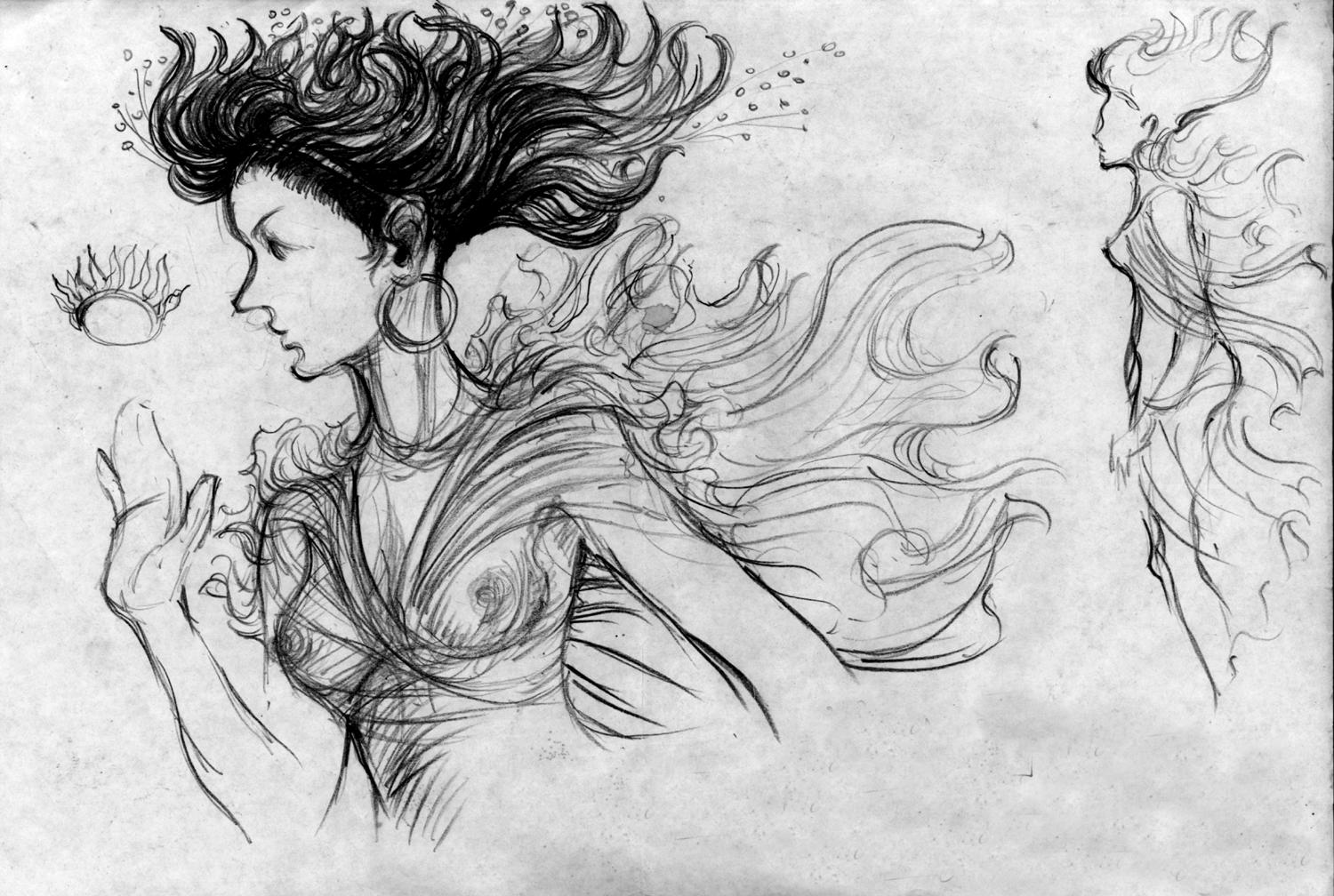
The Fire Goddess

Various musical elements were blended and a great many miniature musical dramas such as the harvest feast and the celebration of blacksmiths, could be seen in the opera. The most salient feature of the opera was the use of the Western classical musical procedure along with Sinhalese folk rhythms to make music not only more dramatic but also to make it more familiar to the local ear. There were many musical phrases in the opera created by addition of notes to codes as sponge-like absorption of folk colors and elaboration, which were having a particular appeal to the audience. They enhanced the spectrum of tonality, which was unimaginable to the academic musicians in the country. The opera was considered a complex cross-breeding. He made the Asian voice colors heard within the operatic tradition and the Western orchestration. When the first anniversary was celebrated as a workshop and a musical evening at the Mini-theater, Colombo, he pointed out how even Pablo Picasso failed as a result of his Eurocentrism and his failure to challenge the western hegemony. He quoted the John Berger's book "The Success and Failure of Picasso" to show how the modern master fail in the latter part of his life.

Picasso should have left Europe... He might have visited India, Indonesia, China, Mexico, or West Africa. Perhaps he would have gone no further than the first place... I am suggesting that outside Europe he would have found his work.

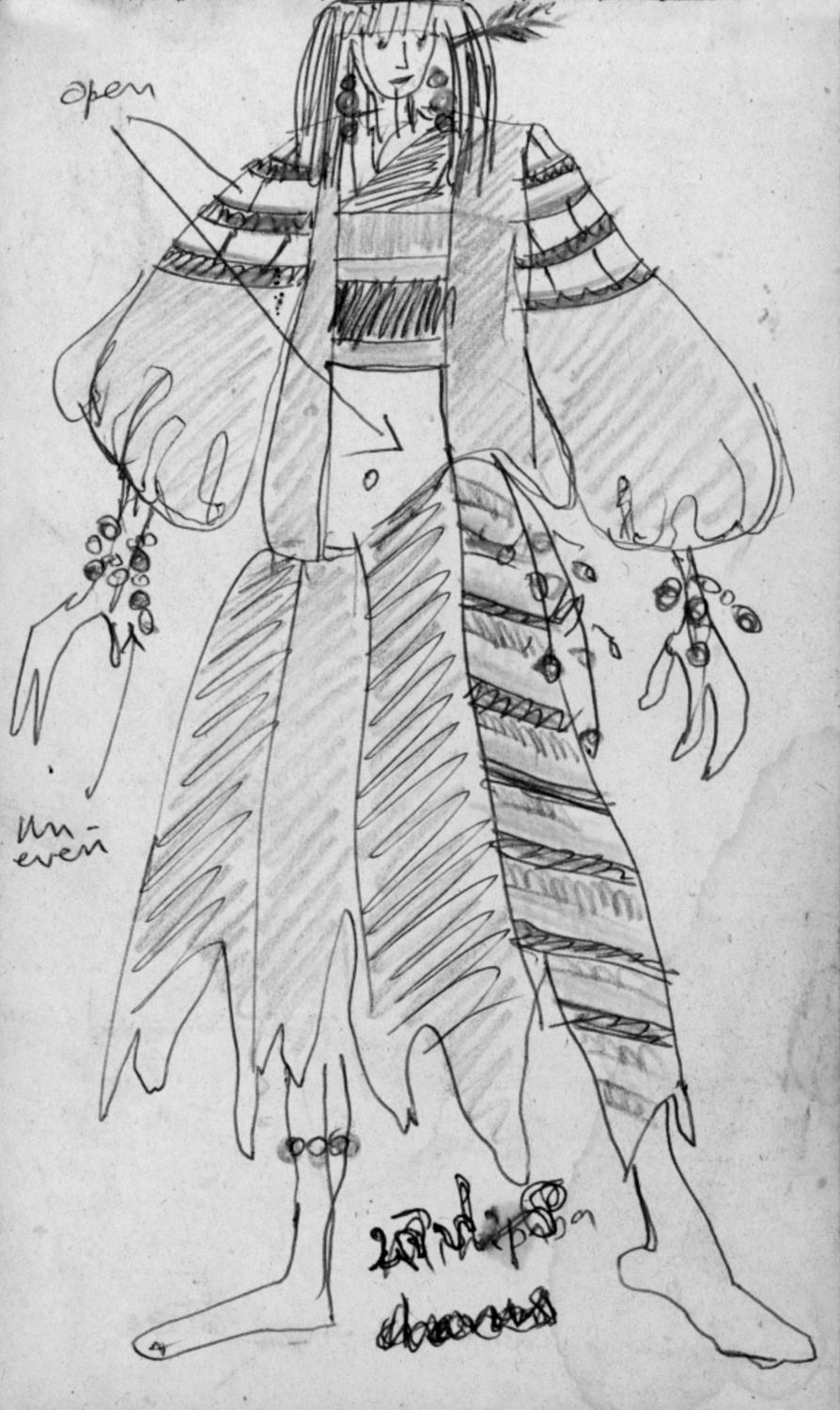
The Dreaming Woman

In many newspaper and TV interviews between 2007/8, Khemadasa spoke about the opera highlighting its strengths of drama and voices with a genuinely Asian color. For him the Operatic voice with an Asian tonality was the raison d'être of the opera . His maturity in his last period took on a new voice driven significance. The originality of the voices amply proved his point although sometimes he lost his own voice due to the old age and sickness. His players gave a remarkable display of their ability, which was quite unknown and unusual to the media sponsored superstar and mega-talent shows. The opera clearly marked the dividing line between good music and thrash. It was an active shaping force in the culture of the period rather than a mere reflection of it. It responded to the social and cultural character of the day and served as a medium for shuffling and reshuffling the building blocks of identity and desire of the culture. As there was no opera culture and necessary entertainment infrastructure to maintain the artistic quality of music in the country, he had to have a strong defense wall to protect the talents cultivated by him from the ongoing degeneracy in local music occurring through reality shows and soap operas commonly known as telees. He even met the parents of his singers or else talk to them over his hand phone to make them aware of the value of their daughters and sons. He advised them how to protect the talents in their young daughters and sons. Sometimes he openly wept seeing that those talents were being wasted in the media industry. He fought violently with the makers of soap operas when they were secretly after his talented students. What he insisted was "Engaged music" similar to what Sartre insisted for literature. But for him it had to be without engaging in any kind of political program. He wanted his players to cultivate not only higher standards but also strong cultural values . After his death some of his students were at a crossroads before the cheap entertainment industry and the opera.

== Plot ==
The opera begins with a dark, wintry scene, which gradually extends to the choral expression of unending sufferings of the people living without the comfort of fire. All other gods except Ginipathi (Prometheus) guard the right of fire and refuse to give it to the human world. Ginipathi sees the suffering on the earth and sends fire to the humans through his sister, the goddess of fire. As the opera unfolds, an enthusiastic boy enters the forest in the mountains and sees the goddess, a fantastic spectacle. He runs to the village and tells his people about his marvellous discovery. Soma, a young hunter and the leader of the community walks into the forest in search of her. Seeing the first human on the earth, the goddess happily presents the gift of fire to him to begin the civilization. With the birth of the new civilization and the change of seasons, the very first harvest on the earth is celebrated. Meanwhile, the boy again comes from the forest and says that Ginipathi is being punished in the forest by the cruel gods. Soma asks his people to come with him to go to the forest to save their hero god. But all of them refuse to go with him. Soma and the fire goddess go in search of Ginipathi. It is a fatal journey for both of them.

== Roles ==
Role	Voice	Cast
Soma, Primitive Hunter	Tenor	Chandimal Hemantha
Gini Devagana, Fire Goddess	Soprano	Indika Upamali
Mihipaba, Glitter of the Earth	Soprano	Subuddhi Lakmalee
Dawala Koluwa, The White Boy	Tenor	Sumudu Pathiraja
Swapnee, The Dreaming Woman	Alto	Umali Thilakarathna
Yajakee, the Priestess	Soprano	Neluka Thishari
Ginipathi, Prometheus	Bass	Krishan Wickramasinhe
Welapennee, the Weeping Woman	Soprano	Wageesha Sadamalee
Shakthi, Amazon	Alto	Upeksha Wickrama
Maha Devi, the Great God	Tenor	Gamini Sarathchandra
Anudevi, Lesser Gods	Tenor	Sumudu Pathiraja, Marshel Janatha

=== Orchestra ===
Name	instrument
Dinesh Subasinghe	First violin
Amarasiri peiris	Viola
Thushani Jayawardana	violin
Namal Gunathilaka	Tabla and percussion
somasiri Badagama	percussion
Samantha Perera	keyboards
Sulara Nanayakkara	violin
S.Wijesinghe	keyboards
Gunasena Cooray	Guitar
Sujeewa	Esraj
Sanath	flute
Dee R Cee members	percussion

== Synopsis ==
The action takes place in legendary times. Humans live in darkness and cold before the history and civilization begins and without the comfort of fire.

=== Act One ===
Scene 1

"ekada pahanak ekada eliyak thavama netha delvee" (No single lamp or light is yet lit) - Chorus - Men and women in dark cloaks shown in silhouette convey their sad feelings. A gleam of hope also prevails amidst the unbearable sorrow.

In a dark world with no lamp to illuminate There is no colossus strength built in us In this dreadful barren land of snow How are we and our children to survive without fire?

Hundreds perished in this horrible land Their flesh, bones and blood turning hard into stones Oh gods look at us, the humans mercifully And render us a flame of fire

All people are in frustration over the way they have to live. They lament over their unchanging fate. Verses on human sufferings are sung by the chorus. They are to live in unsunned caves and with sad memories over their dead ones. Most prominent stage imagery is the sheer coldness. Snow and coldness denote not only the harsh weather conditions. It also evokes loneliness, frigidity and death. Under the onslaught of coldness, the expectations for enlightenment also collapse and reduce the listener to a mood of nostalgia and desperation. These moods are choreographed through the body lines of singers. Lines of chorus singing presents ut pictura poesis.

Scene 2

Soma, a young hunter and the leader of the group sings with his young wife Mihipaba (the Glitter of the Earth) and expresses a desire to see a better world with the shining sun, change of seasons and trees full of flowers. They beg for a flame of fire from a divine philanthropist, who could save them from the doomed life. They hope that the gift of fire would cease winter's cold, make them prosperous and lead them to the enlightenment. A new era would come decked with flowers if gods would not refuse to share the fruits of fire with the humans.

=== Act Two ===
Scene 1

"Rupen apa ha samawana minisa " (Behold the Man whose frame, face and appearance are similar to us the gods)- Ginipathi (Prometheus)- Dressed in white in the kingdom of gods, sings with a deep love for the mankind.

Scene 2

All other gods who are striving to cling to power refuse to share the benefits of fire with the powerless and wretched humans. Their power-hungry superiority is expressed through the singing. They become furious over Prometheus' suggestion to give fire to humans, which is supposed to remain a privilege among them.

=== Act Three ===
Scene 1

" Mulu lo usulana ran teba minisa" (Man is the golden pillar upon which the whole world rests) Soma sings with determination to prove the supremacy of the man over the earth. Although there is a tone of resentment hidden in his voice, he sings with an elemental majesty. Sometimes he draws back from the wild and intractable nature symbolized by the advancing polar bear. At the very same time he refuses to shrink from his responsibility towards his people. With a volcanic energy he even challenges the gods and bids to break open the closed doors of the temple of the gods as they refuses to allow the humans to use fire. Finally he dreams of the beauty of the flowers and foliage in the spring sun. So ends his aria. Bravery and dreaming for a better world are thus restored and we await until he discovers what he wants.

Scene 2

"Himageree himageree himageree" (You are my beloved husband who does not bring the memories of harsh life to the matrimonial bed to disturb it) Mihipaba, the wife of Soma who has all virtues of a traditional Asian woman, sings passionately to express her deep-hearted love for him. She pleads him not to abandon her in exercising a personal choice. She is a woman who has lost her heart to him. He also used to pour his heart to her before, she reveals. Her exaltation provides tones to her lyrical words. She speaks of the fascination of the gifts he has brought her from very far away places. Her love is thus expressed in the face of his adventurous life and perilous enterprise, which signals danger now. Here two worlds are brought together. The world of the traditional wife is about to lose its substance. But it has still retained the warmth of human love and beauty of domesticity. In reply to her, Soma points out the limits of reconciliation of those two worlds.

Scene 3

"Dalvu pahanak nathe niwase" (Darkness and wintry cold have plagued our lives and the bed shared by us is as cold as a dead body) Soma who can no longer be pampered by her deep-hearted love and affection, and endure her traditional attitudes tries to break down her resistance. He drifts between reality and fantasy and looks at his wife with full of compassion. He understands that her forte is the conventional emotions and to realize his aspirations he has to liberate himself from the bondage of traditional domestic life.

=== Act Four ===
Scene 1

Gods appear holding their heads high but with an offended dignity. They look freely indulging in all pleasures and delighting in depriving the humans enjoying fire and other comforts. Although they look graceful and easily rising to ecstatic heights through singing, an agony of suspense is also visible in their faces. Amidst the turmoil, the king of gods stresses the importance of discipline and unity among them. The dialogue confirms their unity and readiness to guard their privilege.

Scene 2

Ginipathi is seen standing in the background without uniting with other gods. He slowly comes towards them and implores them to grant the gift of fire to the mankind. They refuse the request of Ginipathi with a scornful expression. But their dialogue ends in confusion.

=== Act Five ===
Scene 1

A young boy comes running towards the village and breaks into a song. "Dahasak gini mal pipila kande" (Thousand fiery flowers have bloomed on the mountains.) The boy has seen enough to convince the community that they all are about to receive the gift of fire from hands of a goddess. All men and women come to listen to the news brought by him. Once listened to it, all of them unite as a chorus to sing with the beautiful boy.

Soma overhears it and comes forward. He resolves to go to the mountains to see the fire goddess. He is impatient to see the harbinger of the gift. His voice rings out from the community.

Scene 2

"Gini gini gini gini" (FIRE FIRE FIRE FIRE) - Chorus - In an open glade of the village, the youths and maids of the village dance and rally each other craving the gift of fire. They sing: Give us the gift, which would enfold our hands, our limbs, the sun, the moon and planets. And also it would burn the snow-capped mountains. The scene closes with the singing of Soma and the chorus praises the magic of fire.

Scene 3

Mihipaba, the wife of Soma pleads him not to go to the mountains in search of fire. He eventually soothes her in one of the charming numbers in the score. Soma sings: You are the rose given to me by the goddess of earth. Vowing to be faithful to her, he changes his mind to prolong his stay at home till the last moment. At this very moment, he hears his own aria sung in Act Three, Scene 1, echoes in the air. It inspires him to do his duty towards his people. When his aria is thus repeated, he transforms into a majestic martyr who is ready to risk his life for the well-being of the people.

When he begins his journey into the mountains, a charming song on the magic of fire is sung by the Yajakee (the priestess). She says that the fire is the flower that has not yet bloomed on the earth. It is a talisman to the man. Bubbling pleasure and hopes are expressed in a rhythmic and leaping melody. It is sung to herald the fire goddess.

=== Act Six ===
Scene 1

A short choral introduction announces the advent of the Fire Goddess. She who is very beautiful appears in red glare of light like a flame. After a rapt appearance, she begins an intensely thrilling aria - Shreya. At the beginning bursting out in a divine exaltation and then following dramatic variations, she declares that she is the one shining like a flame can scorch the four corners of the earth. Being the sister of Ginipathi, she says, she shall cast away cold through the ordeals of fire. She dances like a fluttering butterfly. Her aria hisses upward like tongues of flame and she (soprano) descends from the rocky pass. She also makes known her unhappy life in the heaven. Like a bird releasing from a cage, she has left the prison-like heaven to become a mortal woman. She is still more furious at the gods' adulteries. She anxiously questions whether the sadness and agony she is now experiencing as a mortal woman is a feeling inherent to the womanhood. Lost in amazement by seeing the huge mountains covered with thick snow, she says that the selfish gods are not to escape her wrath.

As she is about to vanish, Soma appears in amazement. "Tell me who art thou?" he asks her bursting with joy. Seen the first mortal on earth, she happily announces that she is the sister of Ginipathi and came here with the gift of fire. Kneeling down solemnly, Soma swears to receive the divine gift. Both of them exit.

Scene 2

We again see the young boy and hear that Soma with a queen is coming to the village. The villagers stream on to the valley between the mountains. Having seen them, the villagers welcome the couple for a fete and in a dance with them the fire goddess award the gift.

Scene 3

After fire is acquired, sunshine comes and the season changes from winter to spring and summer. First harvest feast is celebrated through the creation of iron tools and dance. All celebrations and the dawn of culture reach the height with the singing in the harvest festival. All people join together to sing songs extolling the power of fire.

=== Act Seven ===
In the assembly of gods, the king of the gods and the ruler of the world explodes like thunder by knowing that Ginipathi has granted the right of fire to mortals. The pleading voice of Ginipathi is drowned in the angry voices of the raging gods. He breaks into an impassioned lament and pleads innocence.

=== Act Eight ===
The boy reappears and this time he is broken-spirited. He tells the community that Ginipathi is being tortured by the cruel gods. The people exclaim in horror and stupefied with fear. They all gather together in terror and confusion. Weeping for her brother, the fire goddess rushes to the mountains. Before the departure, she says that the death will not be strong enough to take the life of his brother.

Soma tries to persuade his people who has been immensely benefited by the gift of fire to go with him to see Ginipathi. But all of them refuse to do so. They scatter in confusion. Finally Soma goes to mountains with the fire goddess. Thus the tragedy sweeps to its end with the betrayal of their heroic benefactor.

=== Finale ===
The opera ends with a Brechtian speech, which relentlessly questions the mediocre attitude of people towards their own heroes, sages, thinkers and artists. The chorus dressed in black sing their farewell not in grief but with an immortal passion for justice.

== Sources ==
- Chamikara Weerasinghe, "Fire on stage in opera", The Daily News (Sri Lanka), 25 May 2007.
- The Sunday Observer (Sri Lanka), "Agonic to ignite", 17 August 2008.
