= Jessie Alice Goonetileke =

Sri Lankan writer

Jessie Alice Goonetileke (15 August 1864 – 10 June 1914) was a Sri Lankan writer of short stories.

She and her sister, S. Jane Goonetileke, are credited as being the first Sri Lankan women to publish works in English when, in June 1884, their stories were published in the first edition of The Orientalist, a journal edited by their father, William Goonetileke. Her first published story, titled "The Tiger and the Bloodsucker," draws from traditional Sinhalese folklore. Neloufer de Mel, a modern critic, recognizes nascent nationalism in the sisters' writing, but finds that "much of this work is imitative and derivative in thought, image, and language" and that they "follow the pattern and attitudes of British writers."

By 1894 she had married James Alfred Wijeyekoon. She died of a cerebral haemorrhage in 1914, in Singapore. She was 49 years old at the time of her death.

== Works ==
- Goonetileke, Jessie Alice (May 1884). Goonetileke, William (ed.). "The Tiger and the Bloodsucker". The Orientalist: 117–119.
