= Dharma Sri Munasinghe =

- Born: March 1, 1930; Kandy, Sri Lanka
- Died: August 28, 2004 (aged 74); Colombo, Sri Lanka
- Other name: Munasinghe Dewage Dharma Sri Munasinghe
- Education: Dharmaraja College, Kandy
- Known for: Prominent Sinhala Radio Play writer

Dharma Sri Munasinghe (March 1, 1930 – August 30, 2004) was a Sinhala radio playwright and film screenwriter and director, best known for his work as the writer of the famous Sinhala radio plays Muvan palessa and Monara thenna. He was also an award-winning Sinhala drama actor, and featured in the play Maname.

== Early life and career ==
Dharma Sri Munasinghe was born on 1 March 1930 in Kandy Udawella village near Danture. He was educated at Dharmaraja College, Kandy where he excelled in studies, and was selected to the University of Ceylon. But Dharma Sri had other plans, as he turned down University entrance, and moved to Colombo in search of employment.

He joined the Sri Lanka Broadcasting Corporation, then the Radio Ceylon, in 1952 as a clerk. Young Dharma Sri had the fortune of working with many contemporary greats of Sinhala broadcasting at Radio Ceylon such as Thevis Guruge, D.M. Colombage, H.M.Gunasekera, P. Velikala and Praba Perera. It was an important period of his life, as Dharma Sri was inspired by these great personalities.

He left the Radio Ceylon in 1956 to pursue a career in the Inland Revenue Department. But he continued writing Radio plays and working as an announcer for SLBC, and even appeared in the famous radio Comedy show Vinoda samaya with comedians Annesley Dias and Berty Gunathilake. Dharma Sri is the writer of 23 Radio play series in total.

Dharma Sri Munasinghe excelled in many disciplines of popular art. He was a Sinhala Radio Play writer; a Radio dramatist, announcer, comedian, producer and actor; an award-winning Theatre actor; a Tele drama screenwriter and actor; an award-winning Film actor, screenwriter & director; and an Oriental dancer.

== Family ==
He was married to Mrs. Silwari Perera(Manel) and was the father of two sons and three daughters. Dharma Sri Munasinghe died on 28 August 2004, at the age of 74. He was a rare artiste who displayed equal celebrity in different spheres of arts, and it's inevitable for Sri Lanka to feel the absence of an artiste like Dharma Sri Munasinghe.

== Awards ==
- Winner of the award for Best Actor in 1965, for the stage play Daruduka
- Winner of the award for Most Creative Acting, for the film Hulawaali
- Won an award for his acting in Bahubootha kolama, which is a preface to the drama Maname

== Works ==
=== Radio plays ===
- Monarathenna - This was the first Sinhala radio play series by a single writer
- Muvan pelessa – This drama was aired for over 40 years (co-writer)
- Gajamuthu
- Guwanviduli rangamadala
- Adaraneeya Julius (1971) – This was the first Sri Lankan detective radio play and was banned
- Mudali mankada – This was based on his research and was banned in Sri Lanka
- Mee messo
- He translated numerous foreign short stories & novels, and adopted as Radio plays
- Joined Annesley Dias & Berty Gunathilake for the famous comedy show Vinoda samaya
- He’s the writer of 23 Radio play series.
- He was a producer, announcer & actor of Lama pitiya, Grameeya sandyawa and Guvanviduli rangamadala

=== Theatre ===
- Ediriweera Sarachchandra’s Maname (1958–59)

=== Tele Drama ===
- Dimuthu muthu – Screenwriter and Actor
- Screenwriter of seven Teledramas

=== Films ===
- Muvan pelessa - Screenwriter and Director of two sequels
- Monarathenna - Screenwriter and Director of four episodes

== See also ==
- Radio Ceylon
- Sri Lanka Broadcasting Corporation
- Sri Lankan literature
- List of Sri Lankan Broadcasters
