= Siri Gunasinghe =

Sri Lankan poet and historian (1925–2017)

Siri Gunasinghe සිරි ගුණසිංහ
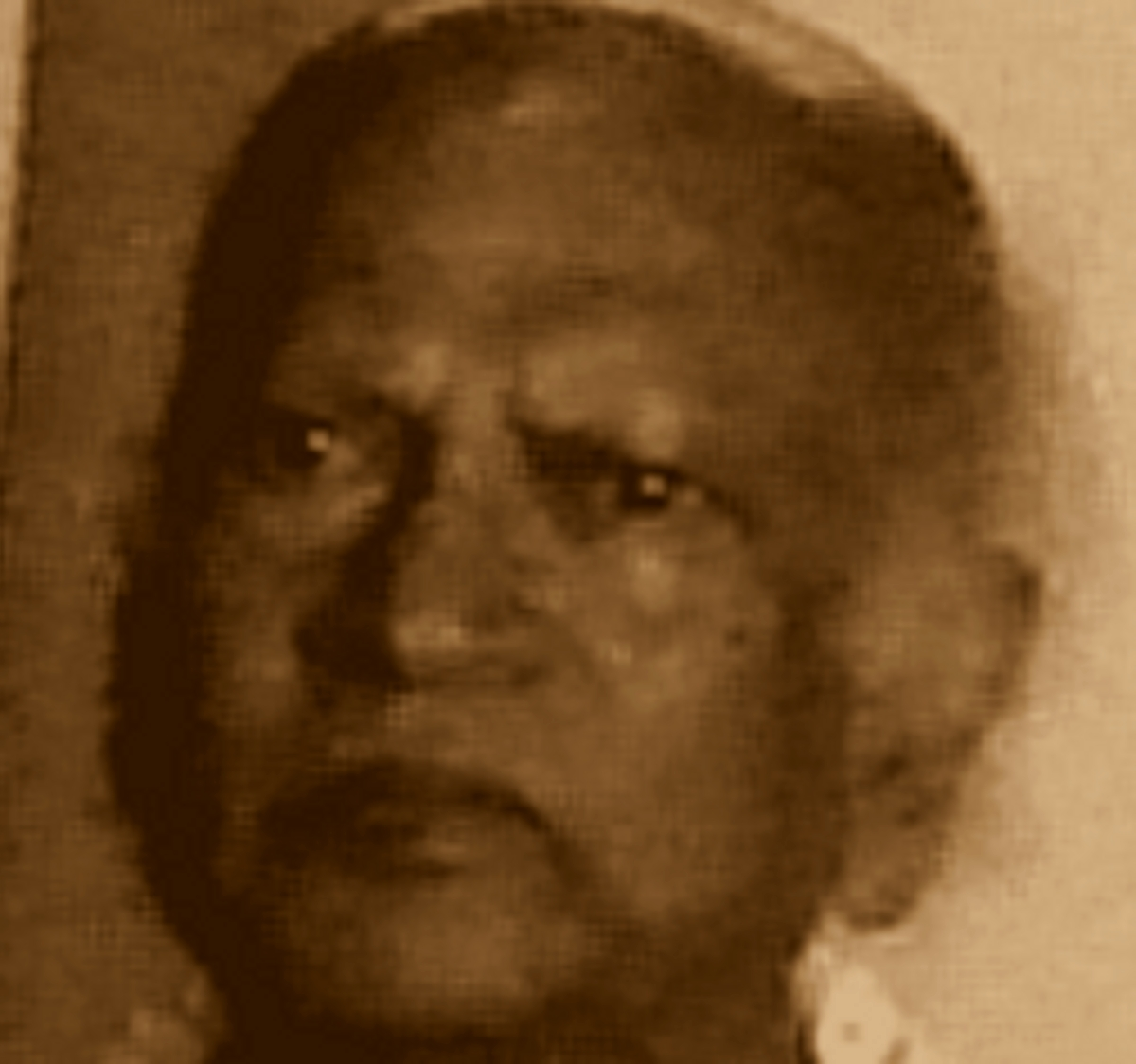
- Born: 18 February 1925; Kegalle, Sri Lanka
- Died: 25 May 2017 (aged 92); British Columbia, Canada
- Education: Mahinda College Galle; University of Ceylon
- Occupation: University professor
- Known for: Writing; Poetry; Literary criticism

Siri Gunasinghe (Sinhala: සිරි ගුණසිංහ; 18 February 1925 – 25 May 2017) was a Sri Lankan academic, poet, Sanskritist, art historian, author and filmmaker. He played a crucial role in honing the creativity of free Sinhala poetry. Gunasinghe was one of the most important advocates of the use of spoken language instead of the literary language in Sinhalese literature (see diglossia).

== Early life and career ==
Siri Gunasinghe was born Ruwanwella in Kegalle District of Sri Lanka. He was educated at Mahinda College, Galle and University of Ceylon. At Sorbonne University, he completed his PhD on 'Techniques of Indian painting'. Later Siri Gunasinghe became a university lecturer and taught at the University of Peradeniya, Sri Lanka and at the University of Victoria, British Columbia, Canada where he was a professor in the Department of History in Art. He subsequently travelled to Paris where he continued his studies and wrote La technique de la peinture indienne d'après les textes du Silpa. His brother Dharma Gunasinghe, is the former Principal of Nalanda College, Colombo.

== Personal life and death ==
Gunasinghe had lived in Canada since 1970. He died on 25 May 2017 at the age of 92.

== Literary career ==
His most outstanding achievements are: 1) the introduction of free verse into Sinhalese poetry with the publication of the collection of poems Mas Lea Nati Ata (Bleached Bones) in 1956; this publication was a major revolutionary force in the literary community at the time. He published 'Hewenella' in 1960, which is considered to be the first Sinhala novel to be written according to the rules of consciousness narrative style. In his writing, Gunasinghe discarded the Sinhala letters 'N' and 'L' (මූර්ධජ ‘ණ‘ සහ ‘ළ‘).

He wrote his poems on themes that were very different from the themes such as Mee Haraka and Rathu Kekula. But he became the first to introduce illustrations into Sinhala poetry. His other poetry collections include Abi Nikmana (1958), Rathu Kekula (1962) and Alakamandawa (1998). He wrote the research article titled as "Sinhala Contributions to the Buddha Statue" which drew attention to the gradually waning murals of most temples.

In 1968, he made the script and directed critically acclaimed film Sath Samudura. The film won eight Sarasavi awards including best picture and best director. He also designed costumes (e.g. for Prof. Ediriweera Sarachchandra's play Manamē). He is also considered a pioneer book cover designer in Sri Lanka and has hosted several radio programs. In 2010, he published the work "Sigiriya: Kashyapage Saundarya Pranamaya" which was earlier translated to "Kassapa’s Homage to Beauty" in 2008.

== Works ==
=== Sinhala ===
- Abinikmana ("The Renunciation of worldly Life")
- Cirantana Sampradāya hā pragatiya ("Tradition and Innovation"; non-fiction work)
- Hevanälla ("The Shadow")
- Mandārama ("Rainy Sky")
- Mas Lē Näti Aṭa ("Bones without Flesh and Blood")
- Ratu Käkuḷa ("The red Bud")
- Sath Samudra ("The seven Seas") - Feature film

=== Other languages ===
- Masks of Ceylon
- Buddhist Paintings from Sri Lanka (Kandy Period)
- La Technique de la Peinture Indienne

== See also ==
- Sri Lankan literature
