= Sirilal Kodikara =

Sri Lankan writer (1924–2021)

- Born: 27 August 1924; British Ceylon
- Died: 19 November 2021 (aged 97)
- Occupations: novelist, poet, journalist, and radio play writer
- Children: Deepa Senevirathna, Amila Kodikara, Pasan Kodikara

Sirilal Kodikara (27 August 1924 – 19 November 2021) was a Sri Lankan novelist, poet, journalist, and radio play writer who wrote in Sinhala. He was a Buddhist priest in the early part of his life.

== Life and career ==
Kodikara was born on 27 August 1924. He started his journalistic career in 1948 writing for a weekly Sinhala newspaper, Sinhala Jathiya. Later he worked under Editor-in-Chief D. B. Dhanapala at the newspaper Davasa, founded in 1961 by M. D. Gunasena. This period of journalism by Kodikara and his contemporaries has been described as “a golden era in the history of local media in Sri Lanka”. Kodikara later wrote for the newspapers Aththa, Heta, and Ravaya. He authored many books on various subjects.

He was known for his stint as a journalist at the now defunct Aththa (Truth) newspaper. His daily column “Ranchagoda Lamaya”, in the form of a two-stanza poem, was heavily laced with biting criticism of whoever was in power and was very popular during the 1970s and 80s. In addition to his short stories, poems, and novels, he wrote “Mahawansa Vimansana” (non-fiction) exploring the myths of the Mahawamsa chronicle. His “Manasa Vila” was produced as an opera by Premasiri Khemadasa.

Kodikara received a 2009 Lifetime Achievement Award from the Editors’ Guild of Sri Lanka and the Sri Lanka Press Institute.

He died on 19 November 2021, at the age of 97.

== Books ==
- Kiyami sihikara
- Mahāvaṃśa vimaṃśana
- Gahen văṭuṇu găhăniya saha tavat aya
- Viśvaya tuḷa viśva
- Ṭayar saya langa nam sthānaya : păbandum daha aṭakin yukta ya
- Mānasa vila saha Kanēru mal
- Diya vălak ossē
- Baka vata
- Kǎlisṭāgē savāriya
- Kanēru mal : vesaṅganaka gē premaya varṇanaya kerena padya kāvyaya
- Magē sākkiya
