= H. M. Kudaligama =

Sri Lankan poet (1918–1973)

- එච්. එම් කුඩලිගම
- Born: Hewawasam Mudiyanselage Munidasa Kudaligama; 1918; Kalutara, British Ceylon
- Died: 21 August 1973 (aged 54–55); Colombo, Sri Lanka
- Education: Dharma Vijaya Pirivena
- Occupations: Poet, writer, journalist
- Years active: 1934–1973
- Children: Geethanath Kudaligama

Hewawasam Mudiyanselage Munidasa Kudaligama (1918 – 21 August 1973 Sinhala: එච්. එම් කුඩලිගම), popularly known as H. M. Kudaligama was a prominent Sri Lankan poet, journalist and a writer. Kudaligama was a poet of the second generation of Colombo era.

== Personal life ==
He was born in 1918 in Kalugangabada village in Kudaligama, Kalutara, Sri Lanka. After completing his primary education from a village missionary school, he later received his higher education at the Dharma Vijaya Pirivena.

After studies, Kudaligama later worked in the plantation industry in Rajawatte. Although he worked at the Lake House as a proofreader, he was a leftist and a Trotskyist.

His eldest son Geethanath Kudaligama is a media consultant, lyric writer and an explorative author. Geethanath has compiled all Kudaligama's published and unpublished poems and published a book called 'Manbandi Panhinda'.

When he was ill at the Colombo General Hospital, he slept on a bench and on the floor in the ward corridor. During this period, The Department of Cultural Affairs has donated Rs. 500 to him. He died on 21 August 1973 in Gothatuwa.

== Career ==
At the age of sixteen, Kudaligama began composing poems for various newspapers and magazines. He preferred to write rather than recite poetry and did not excel in poetry dialogues. In 1934, he published a pamphlet entitled Jinendra Prasansha. As a poet in Colombo era, he was a man who deeply nurtured poetry. In 1946, he wrote the poetry titled Geheniya based on a Hindu story.

Kudaligama is known for poems praising the natural beauty of the Colombo era. His critically acclaimed Ae was published in 1948. On October 15, 1954, he released the anthology of poems titled 'Kunatuwa' published the Maliyadeva Press, Kurunegala. The verse class called 'Kelala Makima' consists of 16 verses written by Kudaligama reveals about the death of Goddess Samudra during the Kotte period by Veediya Bandara. In 1965, he wrote the poetry Ekamath Eka Rataka.

He was popularly known as "Sinhala Shelley" due to his poetry similar to the western poet Percy Bysshe Shelley. The two founders of modern Sinhala dialogue poetry are P. B. Alwis Perera and Kudaligama. In the Sinhala "Balaya" newspaper edited by Hemapala Munidasa, the popular dialogue poem Yuddhayata Giya Ayyagen Nangita was written by Alwis Perera where Kudaligama contributed under the name 'Nalani'. This led to world news coverage of World War II. Meanwhile, in 1968, Kudaligama became the president of the cloth-trousers poetry discussion organized by the Capital Youth Poetry Club.

The format of this dialogue poetry was so popular that Kudaligama had to join several such dialogue poems. Some of them include 'Sthriratnavādaya’ (with Meemana Premathilake), 'Vidyā–Kalāvādaya' (with Alwis Perera) and 'Daskon Vādaya' (with P. K. D. Seneviratne). Together with Kapila Seneviratne, he started and maintained the poetry magazine "Suwanda". It was maintained by Kudaligama even after the death of Kapila Seneviratne. In May 1949, he wrote the poetry for 'Suwanda' Poetry Magazine under the title Budhun Vahanse Saha Minis Parapura which gained large popularity among the Buddhists. He carried out various experiments in styles of poetry and used them. He introduced a new feature to poetry and journalism called Theeru Peadi. The poems he wrote in Silo for the 'Janatha' newspaper were full of sense of humor.
