= Thotagamuwe Sri Rahula Thera =

Venerable Thotagamuwe Sri Rahula Thera Shad Bhasha Parameshwara Sinhala Maha Kavi
- තොටගමුවේ ශ්‍රී රාහුල හිමි
- Thotagamuwe Sri Rahula Thera
- Title: Sangharaja

Personal life
- Born: Jayabahu; 1408 Dematana, Kurunegala, Sri Lanka
- Died: 1491 (aged 82–83) Ambana Indurugiri cave, Elpitiya, Galle District Sri Lanka
- Parents: Prince Wickramabahu Pathiraja from Moriya clan (father); Princess Seelawathi Kirawelle from Kirawelle clan (mother)
- Notable work(s): Salalihini Sandeshaya; Paravi Sandeshaya; Gira Sandeshaya; Kavyashekaraya; Buddhagajjaya; Panchika Pradeepaya
- Education: Buddhist monastic education
- Known for: Sinhala literature, Buddhist scholarship, mastery of six languages
- Other name: Vachissara Rahula Thera
- Occupation: Buddhist monk, poet, scholar, author
- Honors: Shad Bhasha Parameshwara; Tripitaka Vagisvaracharya; Bauddha Charawarthi

Religious life
- Religion: Buddhism
- Denomination: Theravada Buddhism
- Temple: Thotagamuwa Vijayaba Pirivena
- Institute: Thotagamuwa Vijayaba Pirivena
- Dharma name: Vachissara Rahula

Senior posting
- Teacher: Uthurumula Rahula Thera; Wilgammula Thera; Vidagama Maitreya Thera
- Post: Head of Thotagamuwa Vijayaba Pirivena
- Period in office: 15th century
- Students: Weththawe Thera

Thotagamuwe Sri Rahula Thera (1408 – 1491) (Sinhala: තොටගමුවේ ශ්‍රී රාහුල හිමි), was a Buddhist monk and an eminent scholar, who lived in the 15th century in Sri Lanka. He was a polyglot who was given the title "Shad Bhasha Parameshwara" due to his mastery in six oriental languages which prevailed in the Indian subcontinent. Sangharaja Thotagamuwe Sri Rahula Thera was also a distinguished author, veteran astrologer and a proficient ayurvedic physician.

== Biography ==
Thotagamuwe Sri Rahula Thera was born in 1408 at Dematana (dethawa), a village close to Dambadeniya in Kurunegala District. His lay name was Jayabahu. Though his parentage is uncertain, some sources reveal that his mother was the elder sister of queen Keerawelle Kumari, who was the chief consort of King Parakkramabahu VI of Kotte. Accordingly, his mother was princess Seelawathi and his father was prince Wickramabahu pathiraja(prince Manikka Pathiraja). Since prince Jayabahu 's mother died when he was an infant, he was kept under the guardianship of King Parakkramabahu VI and his wife. Prince Jayaba had his education initially under Uthurumula Rahula Thera and Wilgammula Thera who were also relatives of his. They have ordained prince Jayabahu as a novice monk and was given the religious name Vachissara Rahula Thera.

After getting ordained as a Buddhist monk young Rahula Thera moved to the Wijayabha pirivena of Thotagamuwa for his further education. Vijayaba Pirivena in Thotagamuwa, Hikkaduwa in Galle District, served as the most renowned and popular education center of the Kotte era. King Vijayabahu I of Polonnaruwa was the founder of this famous pirivena which has produced many oriental scholars to the country. In a short period of time young Rahula Thera acquired a wide knowledge in literature, oriental languages and Buddhist scriptures. He was well competent in reciting the entire Tripiṭaka by rote and amused his teachers and the king. It was at Vijayaba Pirivena in Thotagamuwa that Sri Rahula Thera spent most of his life and created some of his most famous literary works. Later he succeeded his grandfather Uthurumua Rahula Thera and Galthurumula Thera as the chief prelate of Vijayaba Pirivena in Thotagamuwa, Hikkaduwa. Thotagamuwe Sri Rahula Thera was also the first Sri Lankan bhikkhu to obtain the post of Sangharaja, which was conferred on him by King Parakramabahu VI.

There are two legendary stories regarding the latter life of Thotagamuwe Sri Rahula Thera. One version is that after rendering a yeoman service to the Sinhalese literature, Thotagamuwe Sri Rahula Thera died peacefully circa 1491. It is said that due to the effect of an Ayurvedic drug named "Siddaloka Rasaya" which was taken by Sri Rahula Thera, his body did not decompose like a usual dead body and kept growing beard and nails. Because of this mysterious nature of the cadaver it was not cremated as usual. The cadaver of Sri Rahula Thera was kept at Vijayaba pirivena for some time, until the arrival of Portuguese invaders in Sri Lanka in 1505. Villagers who feared a possible abduction of this mysterious body by the Portuguese, took it to the Indurigiri cave at Ambana near Elpitiya in Galle district which was surrounded by a dense forest cover for safety.

The other version is that Thotagamuwe Sri Rahula Thera departed Vijayaba Pirivena for Obbegoda temple in Monaragala District to spend his retirement peacefully. After staying there for few years he moved to Dickwella in Matara District where he stayed briefly before finally settling down at Indurugiri cave in Ambana close to Elpitiya, where he stayed until his death in 1491.

There was a fight between the villagers and the Portuguese at a place called Aviluma over the cadaver which was placed in a stone boat. It is said that there were demons or spirits who were protecting the cadaver, but with the help of treacherous locals, the Portuguese managed to shove them away.

=== Shad Bhasha Parameshwara ===
Thotagamuwe Sri Rahula Thera was proficient in six Indian languages; Sanskrit, Prakrit, Magadhi, Apabhramsa, Shauraseni and Paisachi in addition to Sinhala. Hence he was known as Shad Bhasha Parameshwara which means 'Master of six languages'.

== Literary works (selection) ==
Thotagamuwe Sri Rahula Thero was a pillar in Sri Lankan literature, who authored a number of highly reputed Sinhala literary works. Some of his notable creations are:

- Buddhagajjaya (1430)
- Uruthamala Sandesaya (1435)
- Paravi Sandeshaya (1445)
- Gira Sandeshaya
- Salalihini Sandeshaya (1447)
- Kawyashekaraya (1449)
- Parakumba Siritha
- Panchika Pradeepaya (1457)
- Buddhipasadiniya (1480)
- Sakaskada
- Mawula Sandesaya

== Folklore and mortal remains ==
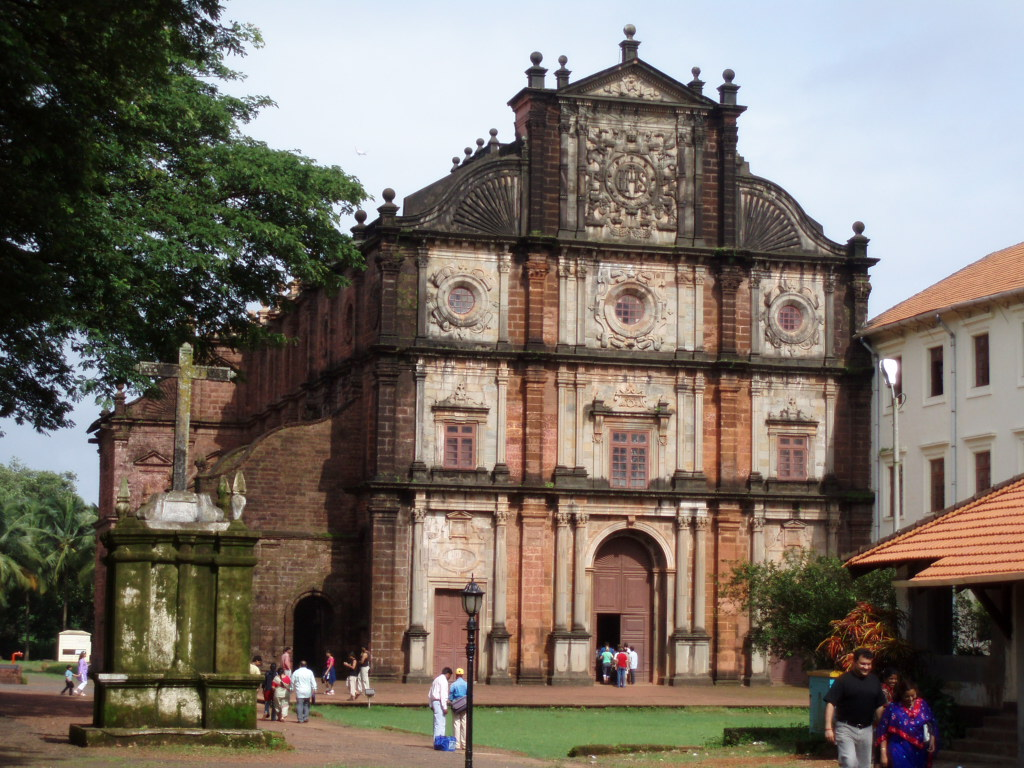
Some historians believe that the mortal remains kept in the Basilica of Bom Jesus, Goa, is the incorrupt body of Thotagamuwe Sri Rahula Thera.

There are many folklore stories regarding Sri Rahula Thera's life from his childhood until death. Though he was a child prodigy, he was a kind of a mischievous character who loved adventures. One famous story is that he drank an entire bottle of a medicinal oil called "Saraswathi oil" (Saraswathi Thaila) which helps to boost memory power, whereas it is prescribed to use only a drop. It is believed that due to the effect of this medicinal oil, Thotagamuwe Sri Rahula Thero had extraordinary memory powers throughout his life. In the local lore and legend it is also said that Thotagamuwe Sri Rahula Thera was an exorcist who had controlled demons by mantra to do manual labor work.

According to the view of some historians and critics, the mortal remains kept in the Basilica of Bom Jesus in Goa, India, is the incorrupt body of Thotagamuwe Sri Rahula Thera, which was smuggled by the Portuguese from the remote village of Ambana in Southern Sri Lanka. It is believed that due to the effect of the Ayurvedic drug named "Siddalaoka Rasaya", which he had taken during the latter part of his life, his body will remain intact without decomposing until the year 4230 AD.

== See also ==
- Sri Lankan literature
