= Wimalaratne Kumaragama =

- Born: January 18, 1919; Pathadumbara, Sri Lanka
- Died: December 30, 1962 (aged 43); Sri Lanka
- Education: Dharmaraja College, Kandy
- Occupation: Divisional Revenue Officer
- Known for: Great Sinhala poet

Wimalaratne Kumaragama (January 18, 1919 – December 30, 1962) was a prominent Sri Lankan poet, of the Colombo era. A Divisional Revenue Officer (DRO) by profession, his poems were centred around Wanni and its people. They evoke the life of the village and its characters, surroundings, environment, animals and experiences. He depicted the villagers' lives in a broader perspective and described the environment beautifully in poetic language

== Early life ==
Wimalaratne Kumaragama was born on 18 January 1919 at Narampanawa, Patadumbara, Pallispattu Korale West. He was the second in a family of seven and possessed a majestic and charismatic personality. He had his primary education at Werapitiye school and later attended the bilingual school at Teldeniya and Sri Rahula College, Katugastota. He ended his schooling at Dharmaraja College, Kandy. Even as a student, he was interested in Sinhala literature, and wrote poems for the school magazine. At Dharmaraja, he was an outstanding student and passed the matriculation examination with distinctions.

== Civil service and poetry ==
After passing the Government Clerical Competitive Examination, Kumaragama started his career as a clerk at Kaccheri, Anuradhapura. In 1942, he was successful in the D.R.O. examination. In 1944, he assumed duties as an Assistant Government Agent at Anamaduwa. He later served as a DRO in areas including Hanguranketha, Kalawana, Daladagama and Kotmale.

He loved Wanni and its villagers. Like Leonard Woolf, the great Kumaragama lived with the villagers and his poems were centered around Wanni. The general public loved his company. Sometimes the villagers came in search of him to solve their private and confidential problems. He kept everyone happy, and sometimes recited "Hitiwan Kavi", or instant verses.

Some of his outstanding, famous and popular poems, "Wanniye mal", "Harak Hora", "Iiyanayake", "Yantam beruna", "Game-wewa" and "Herath Hami", depict the true life of the villagers of Wanniya.

He also served as the editor of the Colombo Young Poets' Society.

Kumaragama was a fine student of English literature. He was a voracious reader and had a good knowledge of English poetry. He, as well as his contemporaries Meemana Premathilake and Sagara Palansooriya, were said to be great admirers of Romantic poets John Keats, Percy Bysshe Shelley, William Wordsworth and Alfred Tennyson.

After a life entirely devoted to uplifting the standard of living of the poor villagers of Wanni, Kumaragama died on December 30, 1962.

== Books ==
- Nilseenaya (1941)
- Oruwa (1942)
- Sanwega Wedana (1946)
- Sapumalee (1946)
- Surathallu (1961)

== Poems ==
- "Herath Haami"
- "Aiyanayake"
- "Dadayama"
- "Wanniye mal"
- "Walas Dadayama"
- "Game wewa"
- "Kira"
- "Aarachchi rala"
- "Sirageya"
- "Yantham Beruna"
- "Harak hora"
- "Buduruwa"
- "Sundara Haami"
- "Aganthuka sathkaraya"
- "Awurudu niwaduwa"
- "Muthuge prashna"
- "Wanniye dosthara"

== See also ==
- Sri Lankan literature
- Sagara Palansuriya
