= Piyasena Kahandagamage =

Sri Lankan writer

Piyasena Kahandagamage (1938?- 2003.08.16) is a Sinhala novelist and poet. Born in Baddegama, Galle, Sri Lanka he was a teacher by profession and a union leader. After the UNP government came to power in 1977 he was transferred (as a punishment for his political work) to rural Bintanne in Ampara district, where he based most of his novels.

Kahandagamage lost his job after the 1980 general strike. He started writing several serialized novels and articles for the Divaina newspaper. Most of his stories are based around Dambana area where he lived and worked. He wrote several non-fiction books on Veddha culture, language and Sri Lankan farming methods.

His unique experience living among veddhas and his writings put him among the handful of writers who wrote about the rural Sinhalese and veddhas, including Leonard Woolf and Maya Ranjan. His book Vanagatha Charika was translated to English as Jungle jaunts by Tilak Balasuriya.

== Works ==
- Bintanne Janakavi
- Bintanne Vitti
- Dakune Palathe Katabaha
- Digamadulu Janavahara
- Ibema Nalavian Puthe (collection of poems, 1979)
- Janasrutiya ha Janatava
- Kataka Mahima: Kamatha
- Kataka Mahima: Kumbura
- Kataka Mahima: Kempahan
- Kohombane Vatta Vidane (1988)
- Maa dutu Bintanne
- Navum Polova (1986)
- Nimanayake Andare
- Panamure Ath Raja
- Prasdhesiya Vivahara
- Vanagatha Charika
- Vana Vadule Vasanthaya
