= Vivimarie Vanderpoorten =

Sri Lankan poet

Vivimarie VanderPoorten
- Born: Kandy, Sri Lanka
- Occupations: Poet, University Lecturer in English
- Writing career
- Period: 2007 to present
- Genre: poetry
- Notable works: Nothing Prepares You, Stitch Your Eyelids Shut, "Borrowed Dust"
- Notable awards: Gratiaen Prize
- Website: vivimariev.blogspot.com

Vivimarie VanderPoorten is a Sri Lankan poet. Her book Nothing Prepares You won the 2007 Gratiaen Prize. She was also awarded the 2009 SAARC Poetry Award in Delhi.

== Early life and education ==
Born in Kandy, Sri Lanka of Belgian and Sinhala ancestry, Vanderpoorten grew up in Kurunegala. She holds a BA from the University of Kelaniya and an MA and PhD from the University of Ulster, UK.

== Career ==
VanderPoorten is currently a senior lecturer in English language, literature, and linguistics at the Open University of Sri Lanka.

Vanderpoorten's first book, Nothing Prepares You, was published in 2007 by Zeus Publishers. Her second collection of poems, Stitch Your Eyelids Shut (2010) addresses issues that include feminism and the aftermath of Sri Lanka's Civil War. Her third collection of poems "Borrowed Dust" was published by Sarasavi, Colombo in 2017. Vivimarie made an appearance at the Galle Literary Festival 2011, where she read poetry about her reaction to the killing of Lasantha Wickrematunge.

Her work has been translated into Sinhalese, Spanish, and Nepalese, and Swedish, and published in India, Bangladesh, Mexico, Sweden, and the UK, as well as in online journals such as sugar mule and the open access journal 'postcolonial text'.

She lists Kamala Das, Margaret Atwood, Maya Angelou Anne Sexton, and Sharon Olds among authors who have influenced her, and Moshin Hamid, Khaled Hosseini Chimamanda Ngozi Adichie and Jeanette Winterson as contemporary writers that she reads.

== Critical reception ==
Her poetry has been called "gentle, reflective minimalism which touches the soul" by Dr. Sinharaja Tammita-Delgoda, the chairman of the panel of judges who awarded her the Gratiaen Prize Neloufer de Mel said, of her first book "nothing prepares you is a remarkable first book which announces the entry of a very talented poet onto the stage of Sri Lankan creative writing in English. Vanderpoorten’s poems have an impressive range of subject matter from the personal to the political and reflect saliently on issues of gender, race, and class while offering us vivid contexts of love, loss, violence, and joy. They exemplify a good command of rhyme and rhythm, and in their economy of utterance offer an enabling lucidity within which poet and reader can meet, and memorably so for the reader."

== Awards and honours ==
Her first book Nothing Prepares You was awarded the 2007 Gratiaen Prize and the 2009 SAARC Poetry Award. She won the State Literary Award for English poetry (sharing the award with another Sri Lankan poet, Ramya Chamalie Jirasinghe) in October 2011. Her third collection of poems, Borrowed Dust (in manuscript form) was shortlisted for the 2016 Gratiaen Prize, and won the Godage Award for poetry in English after publication. Her poetry is taught in a number of university courses and a poem from her first collection is currently on the GCE (Advanced Level) English syllabus in Sri Lanka. A fourth collection of poems was published as a chapbook "Recidivist Heart" (New and Selected Poems) by Tangerine Press, London. She has translated two collections of poems from Sinhala; Upekala Athukorala's "Irthu Aga Shesha path" as "Speechless is the River" (Published by Sarasavi, 2023) and Kusal Kuruwita's "Asparshaneeyan Wetha" as "To Untouchables" which was shortlisted for the inaugural Vidarshana Literary Prize for Translation into English in 2024.

== Sources ==
- sundaytimes.lk
- sundaytimes.lk
- gratiaen.com
- bbc.co.uk
