= Gurulugomi =

Gurulugomi was a Sinhalese literary figure, who lived in the 12th century in Sri Lanka. He is renowned as one of the rare masters of Sinhala classical diction and style. Gurulugomi was also proficient in other oriental languages such as Pali, Sanskrit and Prakrit. He was also fluent in Latin and Greek languages.

== Notable creations ==
- Amawatura
- Dharmapradipika

== See also ==
- Sri Lankan literature
