= Maya Ranjan =

Sri Lankan writer

Mahanama Rajapaksha (1913 – 16 November 1968), who wrote under the pseudonym Maya Ranjan, was a prominent Sinhala writer and schoolteacher from Sri Lanka.

His magnum opus Digaamadulle Aashcharyaya (Sinhala: දිගාමඬුල්ලේ ආශ්චර්යය, lit. 'The Enchantment of Digaamadulla'), published in 1957, was important to Sri Lankan literature and established him the country's pioneering wildlife non-fiction writer.

He also translated Homer's Iliad and Odyssey and Sir Walter Scott's Ivanhoe into Sinhala.

== Publications ==
=== Own work ===
- Digaamadulle Aashcharyaya (දිගාමඬුල්ලේ ආශ්චර්යය/The Enchantment of Digaamadulla)
- Pitisara Minissu (පිටිසර මිනිස්සු/Rural Folks)
- Mage Raajyaya (මගේ රාජ්‍යය/My Kingdom)
- Ape Raajyaya (අපේ රාජ්‍යය/Our Kingdom)
- Kalisama saha Sukumari (කලිසම සහ සුකුමාරි/ Sukumari's Pants)
- Weediya Bandara (වීදිය බණ්ඩාර)
- Neela (නීලා)
- Kumaraya saha Ran Menika (කුමාරයා සහ රං මැණිකා/The Prince and Ran Menika)
- Heenen gae suwandha (හීනෙන් ගෑ සුවඳ/Dreamed Fragrance)
- Sahodarayo denna (සහෝදරයෝ දෙන්නා/Brothers)
- Pandukhabaya (පණ්ඩුකාභය)
- Prema Poojawa (ප්‍රේම පූජාව/Romantic devotion)
- Atalle upan Kumariya (අටල්ලේ උපන් කුමරිය/The Princess who was born in Atalla)
- Nirbheetha punchi sannaliya (නිර්භීත පුංචි සන්නාලිය/The gallant little dressmaker)

=== Translations ===
- Throejapura Sangramaya (ත්‍රෝජපුර සංග්‍රාමය) - translation of Iliad and Odyssey
- Wana Sangramaya (වන සංග්‍රාමය) - translation of Ivanhoe
