= Gunadasa Amarasekara =

Sri Lankan writer

- Born: 12 November 1929 (age 96); Galle District, Sri Lanka
- Education: Mahinda College, Galle; Nalanda College Colombo; University of Ceylon
- Occupation: Dental Surgeon
- Known for: Short story writing, poetry

Gunadasa Amarasekera (born 12 November 1929) is a prominent Sinhala writer, poet, and essayist from Sri Lanka.

== Early life and education ==
Gunadasa Amarasekera was born in Yattalamatta in Galle District. He was educated at Mahinda College, Galle and Nalanda College Colombo.

In the early 1950s, his short story “Soma” was selected to represent Ceylon in a world short story competition organized by the New York Herald Tribune. It was published in the collection of World Prize Stories in 1952.

Dr Amarasekara was presented with the Nalanda Keerthi Sri award in 2010 by his alma mater Nalanda College, Colombo.

Amarasekera is a graduate of University of Ceylon and is a Dental Surgeon by profession. He is one of the founding fathers of the Peradeniya school of literary tradition of modern Sri Lankan literature.

== Publications ==
A list of literary works of Amarasekara,

Novels

- Karumakkarayo (1953)
- Yali Upannemi (1960)
- Gandhabba Apadanaya (1969)
- Asathya Kathawak (1981)
- Premaye Sathya Kathawa (1983)
- Gamanaka Mula (1988)
- Gamdoren Eliyata (1990)
- Vanka Giriyaka (1992)
- Inimaga Ehalata (1992)
- Yali Maga Wetha (1993)
- Duru Rataka Dukata Kiriyaka (1999)

Short stories

- Rathu Rosa Mala (1950)
- Jeevana Suwanda (1957)
- Ekama Kathawa (1972)
- Katha Pahak (1975)
- Gal Pilimaya Saha Bol Pilimaya (1989)
- Marana Manchakaye Dutu Sihinaya (1993)

Poems

- Bhaavageeta(1952)
- Uyanaka Hinda Litu Kavi (1957)
- Amal Bisso (1958)
- Gurulu Watha (1972)
- Avarjana (1972)
- Asak Da Kava (2003)

Plays

- Pavuru Padanam (1970)
- Kavhandayaka Kathandaraya (1991)

Literary criticism

- Vicharaya Saha Vinodaya (1951)
- Aliya Saha Andayo (1966)
- Abuddassa Yugayak (1976)
- Anagarika Dharmapala Marxvaadida? (1980)
- Ganaduru Madiyama Dakinemi Arunalu (1988)
- Arunaluseren Arunodhyata (1991)
- Jathika Chinthanaya saha Jaathika Aarthikaya (1993)
- Sinhala Kawya Sampradaya (1996)
