= Premasiri Khemadasa =

Dr. Premasiri Khemadasa

Background information
- Also known as: Khemadasa Master
- Born: Guruge Premasiri Khemadasa Perera; 25 January 1937; Wadduwa, British Ceylon
- Origin: Sri Lanka
- Died: 24 October 2008 (aged 71) Colombo, Sri Lanka
- Genres: Sri Lankan music, Classical music
- Occupations: Music director, composer

Deshamanya Kala Keerthi Dr. Premasiri Khemadasa (Sinhala: ආචාර්ය ප්‍රේමසිරි කේමදාස) (25 January 1937 – 24 October 2008) also known as "Khemadasa Master" was a Sri Lankan music composer. Exploring the various styles of music around the world Khemadasa endeavoured to develop a unique style of music. He combined Sinhala folk tunes, Hindustani music, Western music and many other streams of music in his compositions while adapting them to fit contemporary music.

== Biography ==
=== Early life ===
Khemadasa grew up in Talpitiya, Wadduwa and attended St. John's College Panadura and then Sri Sumangala College Panadura. Born the thirteenth child into a poor rural family on the west coast of Sri Lanka, Khemadasa started with nothing. There was no musical heritage in his family. He was self-taught, learning how to play on cheap bamboo flutes when he was only 6 years old. In all his life, Khemadasa would never receive formal training in music. As a teenager, he became a gifted flautist.

Khemadasa was asked to come to the Radio Ceylon for an interview on the day he was scheduled to take his Senior School Certificate examination. He finished the examination much ahead of time and travelled to the audition. He passed the audition and became a member of Radio Ceylon.

His two daughters Anupa and Gayathri now moved into father's stream.

=== As a composer ===
Khemadasa's debut as a film composer came with Sirisena Wimalaweera's Roddie Kella. With his score for Bambaru Ewith he introduced a style of music unacquainted to Sri Lankan cinema. He then began collaborating with acclaimed director Lester James Peries handling the music for films like Golu Hadawatha and Nidhanaya. Critics praised his film scores, Khemadasa's signature in film music is moulded by the use of elements from Classical Western music and other sources to heighten the emotion suggested by the picture. Some of his compositions are influenced by Western composers of opera such as Giuseppe Verdi and Wolfgang Amadeus Mozart.

Lately Premasiri Khemadasa has given his contribution to films such as Agnidahaya, and Ammavarune—the last film by Lester James Peiris before announcing his retirement.

Other scores written by Khemadasa were for films such as Hansawilak, Thunweniyamaya, Paradige, and Yasa Isuru, all of which widened his acclaim in the field of cinema. He has also composed music for films produced outside Sri Lanka (Thousand Flowers).

Khemadasa's created the theme music for Chandrasiri's television series Dandubasnamanaya. He wrote scores for teledramas including Chandrasiri's Weda hamine, Sathara denek senpathiyo, Akala sandhya, Dharmasena Pathiraja's Gangulen egodata, Ella langa walawwa, Pura sakmana, and Bandula Vithanage's Asalwesiyo. He contributed to the teledrama Sadisi tharanaya by Devinda Koongahage.

He also contributed to stage dramas such as Jayantha Chandrasiri's Mora, Ath, and Dharmasiri Bandaranayake's Makarakshaya & Dhawala bheeshana.

Furthermore, he has composed symphonies like Muhuda, Mage kale mavni and Sinhala Avurudda. His cantata named Pirinivan Mangalya, probably the only Buddhist cantata ever composed, was based on the death of the Lord Buddha and it was played at his funeral by the students of the Khemadasa Foundation.

His music includes the use of asymmetric patterns of beats, revolutionary harmonies and novel techniques of playing musical instruments such as the sitar.

Khemadasa is the only known Sri Lankan musician who practised and created opera. He has a large group of students many of whom were derived from rural milieus and trained for performing in his operas. His famous operas include Manasawila, Doramandalawa and Sondura Varnadasi. Recently he created the opera, Agni (opera) about early civilisation. His operas, written in Sinhalese, form what can be recognised as Sinhalese opera. Khemadasa and his pupils have conducted shows in several countries. After a layoff following a kidney transplant he returned to the field of music, even in his 70s, trying to secure the future of Sri Lankan music. At the time of the maestro's demise on 24 October 2008, he was 71 years old.

== Music director ==
=== Films ===
Nedayo (1976)

- Sobana Sitha (1964)
- Sanasuma Kothanada (1966)
- Manamalayo (1967)
- Rena Giraw (1967)
- Golu Hadawatha (1968)
- Hanthane Kathawa (1969)
- Ran Onchilla (1971)
- Nidhanaya (1972)
- Duleeka (1974)
- Desa Nisa (1975)
- Bambaru Avith (1978)
- Muwan Palassa 1 (1979)
- Hingana Kolla (1979)
- Hansa Vilak (1980)
- Janaka Saha Manju
- Yasa Isuru (1982)
- Kaliyugaya (1983)
- Thunweni Yamaya (1983)
- Dadayama (1984)
- Yuganthaya (1985)
- Avurududa (1986)
- Sandakada Pahana (1988)
- Kristhu Charithaya (1990)
- Gini Avi Saha Gini Keli (1998)
- Julietge Bhumikawa (1998)
- Agnidahaya (2002)
- Guerilla Marketing (2005)
- Sudu Kalu Saha Alu (2005)
- Maldeniye Simiyon
- Surabi dena
- Sirimadura
- Sonduru Dadabima (2003)
- Randiya Dahara (2004)
- Ammawarune (2006)
- Kanyavi (2009)

=== Tamil film ===
- Wasanthaththil Oru Wanawil

=== International films ===
- Melam Kottu Thali Kattu [Tamil - India]
- Thousand Flowers
- Music Garden

=== Stage Dramas ===
- Bari Sil
- Sithijaya
- Manasa Wila
- Doramadala
- Mora
- Ath
- Havila sara
- Diriya Mawa saha Age Daruwo
- Angara ganga galabasee

=== Operas ===
- Manasa Villa
- Sonduru warnadasi
- Agni (opera)

=== Teledramas ===
- Ella Laga Walawwa
- Golu Hadawatha
- Weda Hamine
- Dandubasnamanaya
- Durganthaya
- Rajana
- Akalasandya
- Bogala Soundiris
- Diya Bubula
- Idorayaka Mal pipila
- Uthamavi
- Kelimadala
- Sathara Denek Sempathiyo

== Awards ==
Year	Work	Award
1966	Sanasuma Kothanada	Eksath Lanka Rasika Sangamaya
1969	Golu Hadawatha	Sarasaviya Best Music Direction Award
1970	Nari Latha	Sarasaviya Best Music Direction Award
1973	Nidhanaya	Wicharaka Sammanaya
1980	Wasanthe Dawasak	O.C.I.C Award
1979	Bambaru Avith	Presidential Award
1984	Thunweni Yamaya	O.C.I.C Award
1986	Yuganthaya	O.C.I.C Award, Sarasaviya Best Music Direction Award
1990	Sandakada Pahana	Sarasaviya Best Music Direction Award
1992	Dolosmahe Pahana	Sarasaviya Best Music Direction Award
1996	Dandubasnamanaya	Sumathi Teli Award
2001	Rajana	Sumathi Teli Award

== See also ==
- Agni Opera
