= Saman Tilakasiri =

Sri Lankan poet and journalist

- සමන් තිලකසිරි
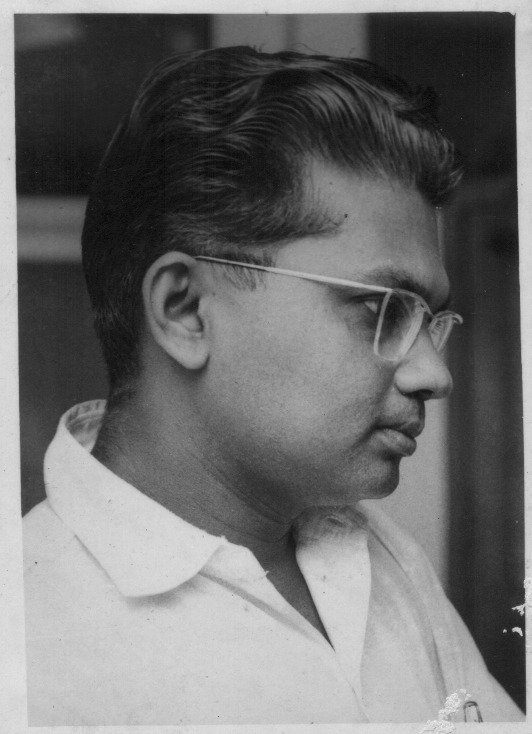
- Born: 11 August 1928; Nawagamuwa, Devalegama, Kegalle, Sri Lanka
- Died: 5 January 2000 (aged 71)
- Education: Buddhist School Nawagamuwa, Kegalle Maha Vidyalaya
- Occupations: Writer, Poet, Journalist. Worked as a teacher in Kegalle Buddhist School in 1951. Joined "Lankadeepa" national newspaper from Times of Ceylon in 1952 and continued his services there as a journalist for 33 years.
- Employer: Times of Ceylon
- Known for: Books on Sinhala poetry, Sinhala literature and grammar. Number of Sinhala books for children and youngsters. Won national awards including Presidential Award and UNICEF Book Competition for "Year of the Child 1979". Children's books by Saman Tilakasiri have become classic contributions to the Sri Lankan and Sinhala literature due to their unique story-telling style that combines conversational and lyrical poetic expression to tell a story which is also enjoyed by adults.
- Spouse(s): Chitra Tilakasiri, née Ambeypitiya of Matara
- Children: Dulani, Punsara, Sajitha.
- Parent(s): Henaka Arachchilage Appuhamy Senanayake and Bamunu Arachchillage Tikiri Menike
- Awards: National Book Award for Best Book for Children, 1969. Presidential Award in Book Competition for the Year of the Children, 1979. National Award for Children's Literature 1981 (Raajya Lamaa Sahitya Sammanaya.)
- Honours: National Honours for Literary Contribution

Saman Tilakasiri (11 August 1928 – 5 January 2000) was a Sri Lankan poet, journalist, senior editor, lyricist, art critique and an award-winning author of books in multiple disciplines.

Henaka Arachchillage Saman Tilakasiri was born on 11 August 1928, in Kegalla area in Devalegama, Nawagamuwa the son of Henaka Arachchilage Appuhami Senanayake and Bamunu Arachchige Tikiri Menika . His early education was at Navagamuwa Buddhist Mixed School (Nawagamuwa Bodu Musu Paasala). This was the school planned and built by his elder brother H. M. Tilakaratne on a family estate, who donated the school to the Colombo Parama Vinyartha Buddhist Society. Tilakasiri was enrolled as the first student on the first day of school's opening. There he completed the studies Senior Exam Advanced Level (I.B., Grade 12 exams) first in Sinhala medium. Then Tilakasiri entered Kegalla Vidyala in Kegalle to study for A. Levels in English. He completed this Senior Exam Advanced Level in English medium with Honours.

Tilakasiri started working as assistant teacher of English in Kegalla Buddhist Mixed School in 1951. Simultaneously he worked as the Kegalle correspondent journalist for Times of Ceylon and Lankadeepa newspapers in Colombo. He passed the Teacher's Training College Exam but chose to abandon his budding teaching career and instead, moved to Colombo and joined the editor's board in Lankadeepa.

Tilakasiri joined Lankadeepa Editor Board as a translator in 1952. He learned the ropes of journalism under the guidance of D. B. Dhanapal.

In Tilakasiri's own words, he "dedicated his whole life to the Art of Journalism". Tilakasiri was assigned by Ceylon Journalists Association in 1961, headed by veteran journalist, Dharmasiri Jayakody, at that time, to compile a book on current journalism. His resulting creation, the book Puwath Path Kalaawa (Art of Journalism, 1961) is considered a rare classic on the topic in Sri Lanka now, providing an insider's look with texts and visuals on all aspects of journalism from start of an assignment to printing it on paper.

Tilakasiri worked for 33 years at Lankadeepa in many roles: in editorial board, as reporter, translator, and writer. He was the senior features editor for around ten years, and eventually became the Deputy Editor of Lankadeepa. He was assigned as chief editor of Rasavahini, a monthly magazine.

His love of education for children and the passion for the betterment of society shines all along his career path through his books for children with poems, his grammar books, the literature reviews for O-Levels, series of articles about the 'world outside our island's boundaries', and translations of Chinese and Japanese folk tales. He was also the author of a well-esteemed series of poems called Sihipada Banduma - a word-play of 'seepada bandum' which means folk song composition. Roughly translated, Sihipada Bandum, which means 'conscience composition', depicted a satirical and enlightening picture of the Sri Lankan social and political transformation from 1950s into 1960s.

He wrote romantic verses as well as children's poem-stories. His published work include research on Sinhala literature, Sinhala grammar lessons, and a number of popular Sinhala books for children and youngsters, several of which won national awards, presidential award and UNICEF Book Competition for "Year of the Children 1979".

Tilakasiri was also a lyricist with a rare catalogue of signature songs sung by prominent Sri Lankan musicians Sisira Senaratne, and children's songs by Visharad Nanda Malini. He also assisted budding artists in their early career, including prominent musicians Visharad W. D. Amaradeva and Visharad Nanda Malini.

== Early life ==
Tiakasiri was born to a rural family in Nawagamuwa, Devalegama in the Kegalle District. Henaka Arachchilage Appuhamy Senanayake was his father, and Bamuru Arachchilage Tikiri Menike was his mother. His elder brother H. M. Tilakaratne constructed a school in Nawagamuwa and Tilakasiri was the first student admitted to the new school, where he had his primary and secondary education until high school graduation in Sinhala medium. Then he joined Kegalle Maha Vidyalaya to study in English medium, and graduated high school for second time, with honours.

Tilakasiri started his literary work, writing and composing poetry at the age of 12 years. While he was a student, he engaged himself as the newspaper reporter of the Kegalle District.

He wrote poems, articles on literature and current topics. A vast number of reportages, translations, news, lyrical, critical, cultural and satirical writings were published in national newspapers and magazines such as Sinhala Bauddhaya, Nidahasa, Peramuna and Kavi Sammelanaya.

== Career ==
Fluent in Sinhala and English, Tilakasiri joined the staff of Lankadeepa, the prominent national newspaper, in 1952 as a translator. D. B. Dhanapala was a source of inspiration for Tilakasiri to become a journalist in the course of time. He continued to work and was elevated to the post of sub-editor and feature editor. Later he was also the editor of Rasavahini Magazine. He also contributed his writing to many publications such as Sanskruthi, Dina Dina, Cinema and other newspapers. He composed lyrics for popular songs and helped new artists to break through in the early stages of career. One such discovery was Visharad W. D. Amaradeva.

He excelled in writing stories and poems for children. His poetry book Pasal Lama Gee (meaning of name: School Children's Songs) was adjudged the Best Children's Book in 1969. Tilakasiri was the pioneer to receive the award for any books for children in Sri Lanka. In 1979 he won an award for his poetry collection Mal Onchilla (meaning of name: Flower Swings) at the national book competition for 1979, the Year of the Children by United Nations. He continued to win awards and accolades many a times.

Tilakasiri also made translations for Children's Books from Chinese Folklore in a series titled Cheena Lama Katha I and II (Chinese Stories for Children.) Tilakasiri has completed the draft for the third book of this series, but was not able to publish it prior to his demise. The book is awaiting to be accepted by a suitable Publishing and Distribution House in Sri Lanka. His previous books were published by publishing houses Dayawansa Jayakody and Godage.

== Body of work ==
Tilakasiri's body of work includes:

- 1962 Puwath Path Kalaawa (Art of Journalism)
- 1969 Pasal Lamaa Gee (Poetry) - First-ever National Award for Children's Book
- 1969 Cheena Lama Katha I (Stories from China for Children Vol. 1, translation)
- 1970 Cheena Lama Katha II (Stories from China for Children Vol. 2, translation)
- 1972 Punchi Suranganawi (Poetry)
- 1974 Kurulu Thegga (Story)
- 1976 Masuru Mithuru (Story)
- 1976 Nawa Hela Gee (Poetry)
- 1981 Mal Onchilla (Poetry) - Presidential Award in 1979, National Award for Children's Books 1981.
- 1982 Amama Raala (Story)
- 1983 Gamaraalage Wangediya (Story)
- 1984 Makara Babaa (Japanese story for young adults. Translation)
- 1986 Peni Rupaya (Story)
- 1987 Senkadagala Den Kutu Kutu (Poetry)
- 1988 Weki Huruwa (Grammar book)
- 1988 Saahitya Wimasuma (Literature critique) with Nayana Tilak Ratnayake
- 1989 Nivaredi Sinhala Maga (Grammer book) with D. D. Mohotti
- 1990 Punchi Menike - Historical Folk Tales in Ancient Kingdoms

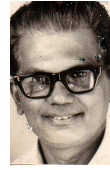
Saman Tilakasiri, in the 1980s

== Unpublished work ==
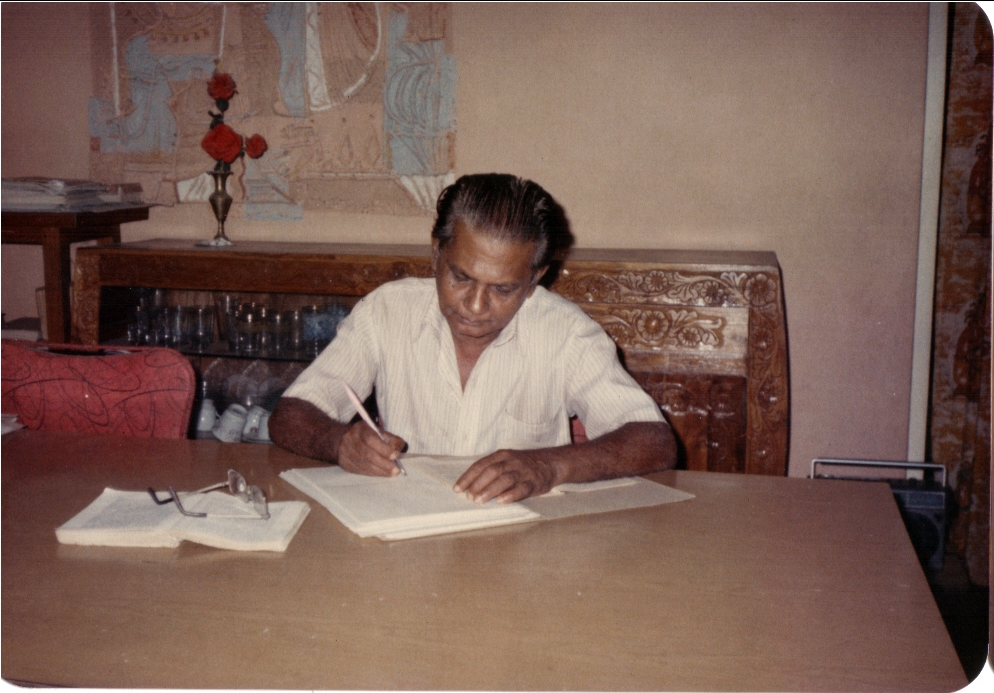
Saman Tilakasiri in the 1990s

Tilakasiri was planning to publish more books with folk tales, stories from Buddhist, Jataka Potha and poetry collections during his twilight years. These valuable collection of work from the renowned author are ready to be printed, complete with illustrations.

== Bibliography ==
- Tilakasiri, Saman (1962). පුවත්පත් කලාව (Puvatpat Kalava). Colombo Sri Lanka Journalist Society.
- 1969 Pasal Lamaa Gee (Poetry)
- 1969 Cheena Lama Katha I (Stories, translated)
- 1970 Cheena Lama Katha II (Stories, translated)
- 1972 Punchi Suranganawi (Poetry)
- 1974 Kurulu Thegga (Story)
- 1976 Masuru Mithuru (Story)
- 1976 Nawa Hela Gee (Poetry)
- 1981 Mal Onchilla (Poetry)
- 1982 Amama Raala (Story)
- 1983 Gamaraalage Wangediya (Story)
- Tilakasiri, Saman (1984). මකර බබා (Makara Baba). self-published.
- 1984 Makara Babaa (Story)
- 1986 Peni Rupaya (Story)
- 1987 Senkadagala Den Kutu Kutu (Poetry)
- 1988 Weki Huruwa (Grammar)
- 1988 Saahitya Wimasuma (Literature)
- 1989 Mohotti, D. D; Tilakasiri, Saman (1989). Nivaredi සිංහල Maga (Nivaradi Sinhala maga). Colombo, S. Godage.

== See also ==
- Lankadeepa
- Times of Ceylon
- W. D. Amaradeva
- Nanda Malini
- Sisira Senaratne
