= Denagama Siriwardena =

Denagama Siriwardena දෙනගම සිරිවර්ධන
- Born: 19 February 1945; Wepathira - Hakmana, Sri Lanka
- Occupations: Writer; Author; Journalist
- Spouse: Kusum Kodithuwakku
- Children: Deepani Siriwardena, Prabath Siriwardena

Denagama Siriwardena is a Sri Lankan writer and journalist.

== Early life ==
Siriwardena was born on 19 February 1945, Wepathira in the town of Hakmana in Southern Sri Lanka. His father was Don Nikulas Jinadasa and mother was Karunawathi Hettiarachchi. Denagama Siriwardena started his school career at Pananwela government school. He studied up to year eight there and moved to Hakmana Methodist college. Siriwardena worked for a time as a Bill clerk at a co-operative shop. After that, he started teaching in a non-governmental school at Pottewela and became a teacher in 1964.

From 1967-68 he studied at the Teachers' Training college - Balapitiya.

As a teacher in his life career he taught in 23 schools in 23 years. Ampara, Colombo, Matara, Hambantota, Galle were some of the districts where he worked. This helped him to gain more experiences about various life styles which exist on the earth. Most of the people he met were poor people. They had a daily struggle. It was to find food for their children. So from these experiences Mr. Siriwardena became sensitive to the heart beats of poor people.

In 1975 Mr. Siriwardena married Kusum Kodithuwakku. They moved to Hambantota that year.

== Literary career ==
Mr. Siriwardena had written many Poems, Short Stories and Articles for Sinhalese News Papers. In 1976 he published his first book. It was Ane Mage Nadu Asanu, a collection of poetry. 1976 also saw the birth of the Siriwardenas first daughter. They named her Deepani Siriwardena. In 1979 their son Prabath Siriwardena was born. In 1980 he participated in the famous July Strike as a school teacher. He was a district Union leader of Ceylon Teachers' Union. Siriwardena lost his teaching job as a result of the strike.

After being unemployed he started selling paddy in Sunday fairs with his younger brother Chithrananda. There his students helped him a lot. Mr. Siriwardena had to undergo so many hardships as a merchant. Later all his experiences as a merchant came out as a youth novel. It was Gurupadhuru and it won the State Youth Literature award in 1995.

In 1982 he got his job back and also became a feature writer for Divaina Sunday newspaper. He wrote many novels and feature articles for Divaina. "Ekthara Police Niladariyekuge Kathawak" and "Ayoma" became very famous among them.

In 1985 the Siriwardena family moved to Matara, from Hambantota. There they settled down in Uyanawatta(1 km far from Matara town).

In 1987 he resigned from his job, teaching, and in 1988 Mr. Siriwardena joined Vidusara science magazine as a Sub-editor. Later he became the deputy editor of Vathmana magazine.

In 1994 Mr. Siriwardena won the IBBY award for his youth novel Mithuro.

In 1995 he resigned from both Vathmana and Vidusara. Then joined Lake House as the deputy editor of Mahaweli Diyawara.

After that, he became the deputy editor of Silumina newspaper. Since then he is working there up to now.

In 1998 Mr.Siriwardena won his second State Youth Literature award. It was for his fifth youth novel, Punchi Gopalla.

Mr. Siriwardena has written two collections of poetry, two short stories, six novels, six youth novels, four biographies, two children's stories and more than hundred "Bosath Katha"s.

In 2012, a felicitation ceremony was organized by the Sinhala-Tamil Writers' Association to honor Siriwardena and two other writers.

In 2025, Mr. Siriwardena launched his autobiography, "Denagama Watha". The autobiography, written in Sinhala, is published by Sarasavi. Its 650-plus pages document Siriwardena's life and contain photographs of his work and family as well as details about his numerous publications.

== Publications ==
A comprehensive list of publications of Denagama Siriwardena.

Poetries

- Ane Mage Naduwa Asanu - 1976
- Dehati Dadhu - 1990

Short Stories

- Emathi Muhuna - 1987
- Werala Saha Thawath Katha - 1997

Novels

- Ayoma - 1988
- Edirille - 1991
- Ekthara Police Niladariyekuwge Kathawak - 1994
- Makara Kata - 1996
- Mithuro - 1992
- Guru Padhuru - 1994
- Katharaka Pipunu Mala Dekak - 1996
- Punchi Gopalla - 1997
- Ganga Langa Liyadda - 1997
- Heen Putha - 2002
- Wehi Walawa - 2005
- Apith Kirata Adhana Daruwan Amme - 2005
- Apata Ape Ath - 2007
- Duppath Daruwange Mithura - 2009

Biography

- Ekthara Damarikayekuge Kathawak(Ukkuwa) - 1989
- Ugaye Minisa(Professor Senaka Bibile) - 1992
- Ahinsawe Ulpatha(E.W Adikaram) - 1996
- Kodhagoda Nahimiyo - 1998
- Podu Janathawage Vidyanchaya(Professor Osman Jayarathne) - 2003
- Pivithuru Rathu Kusuma (Eliyan Nanayakkaara) - 2004
- Guna Nana Deken Uthu Puthumaya Etha Garu (Sirisumana Godage) - 2007
- Kudathihi Siritha (Anadapiya Kudathihi) - 2007
- D.A. Rajapakshe samakalinayange Mathaka Satahan - 2007
- Ape Loku Hamuduruwo - 2014
- Elipaththa - 2015

Children Books

- Deepanige Upan Dinaya - 1994
- Samelge Aluth Lokaya - 1997
- Wasathge Dawasak - 2005
- Ethihasayata Eku Lamai - 2005

Educational

- Nirmana Sahithya sadhaha athwelak - 2005
- Puwathpath Visheshanga Rachanaya - 2007

Buddhist Literature

- Dalen Mideema (Bhawana Athdakeem) - 2003
- Yali Ipadeemak Mata Natha - 2005
- Budhun Samaga Giya Gmanak - 2006
- Dabadiwa Wandanakaruwange Athpotha - 2007
- Seda Paharin Ethera Weemi - 2011
- Nuba Sarana Siyothaku Se - 2011
- Pulun Rodak Se - 2011
- Hima Watena Seetha Ra - 2013
- Podi Hamuduruwange Bhawana Satahan

Other

- Rathu Kenas Mala
- Denagama Watha (autobiography) - 2025

== Translations in other languages ==
Books translated into other languages

- Mithuro [ Translated into English as 'Friends' ] - 1992
