= Sugathapala de Silva =

Sri Lankan dramatist and novelist (1928–2002)

Sugathapala De Silva
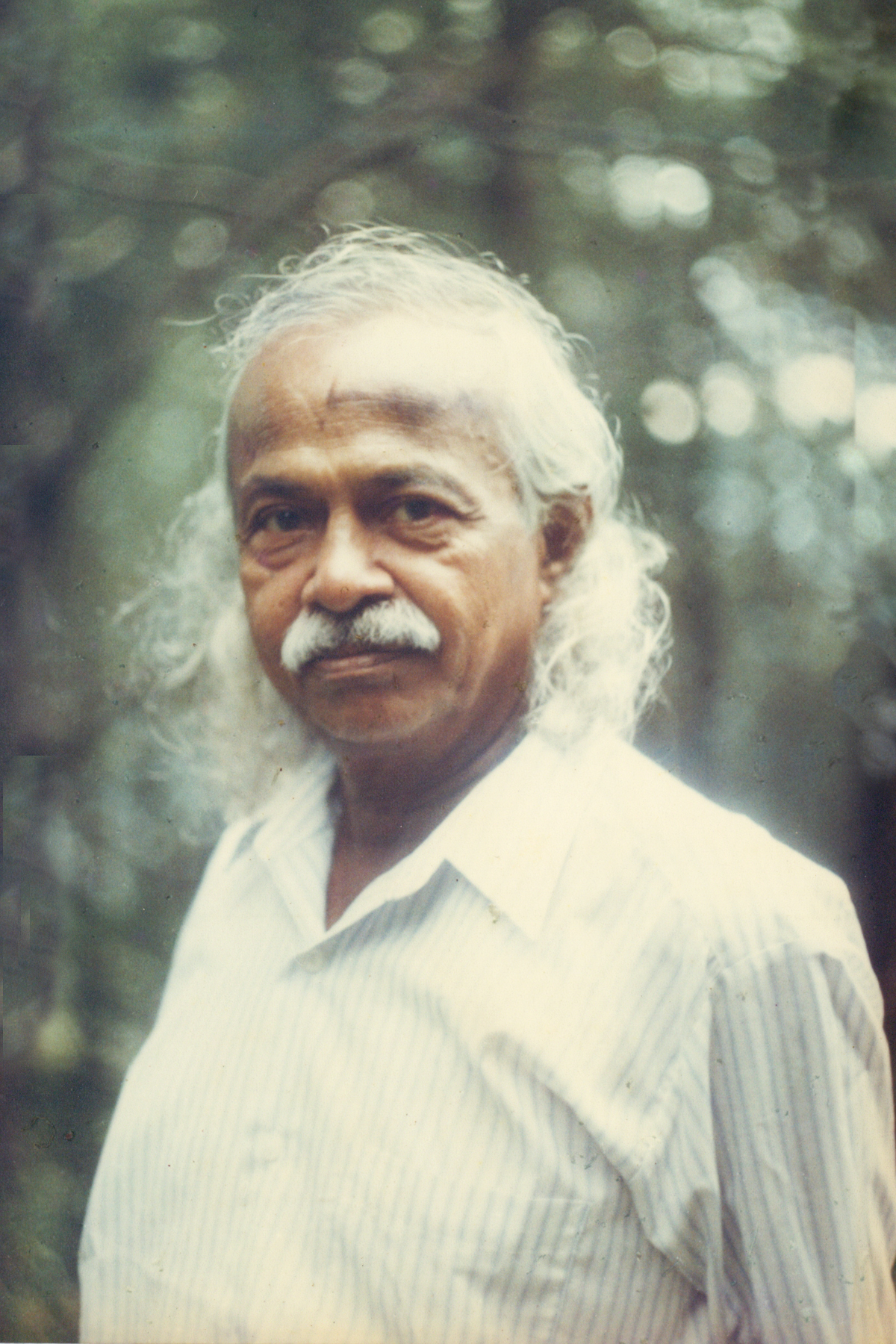
- Born: Avalikkara Gallappattige Sugathapala De Silva; August 4, 1928; Midigama (Weligama, Matara), British Ceylon
- Died: 28 October 2002 (aged 74); Colombo, Sri Lanka
- Education: Siddhartha Maha Vidyalaya, Weligama; Galle College, Unawatuna; Jinaraja boys College, Gampola; Pemrock College, Colombo
- Occupations: journalist, dramatist, novelist
- Years active: 1958-2000
- Spouse: Sheela Sugathapala
- Awards: Best Novel in State Awards

Avalikkara Gallappattige Sugathapala De Silva (4 August 1928 – 28 October 2002), popularly known as Sugathapala De Silva, was a Sri Lankan dramatist and novelist.

== Biography ==
=== Early life ===
Sugathapala De Silva was born on 4 August 1928 Midigama (weligama, Matara), to the son of a small trader. He grew up among Sinhala, Tamil and Muslim traders. His childhood experiences later influenced him to write the novels Ikbithi Siyalloma Sathutin Jeevathvuha and Esewenam Minisune Me Asaw. He studied at Jinaraja Boys' College, Gampola. He worked as a salesman at a bookstall at Wellawatte.

== 1970 ==
De Silva worked for long time at the Sri Lanka Broadcasting Corporation as a producer, and in the late 1960s was in charge of the weekly radio play, and the weekly short story programs on the station, which were the first "stamping grounds" of writers and dramatists who are today well known in their own right.

He married Sheela De Silva (KA Seelawathi born on 30th July 1950) on 10 April 1970. Four children. The eldest son was Dimuthu Prasada Galappatti. The second daughter. She is Vanamali Kaushalya Galappatti. The third child is Sudesh Prabuddha Galappatti. The youngest son is Harindra Pragathi Galappathi.

De Silva was bed-ridden from 1997, and died in hospital on 28 October 2002.

== Produced plays ==
- 1958 Eka Walle Pol (script).
- 1961 Bodinkarayo
- 1964 Thattu geval
- 1965 Harima Badu Hayak (Six Characters in Search of an Author, Luigi Pirandello)
- 1966 Hele Negga Doong Putha (Adaptation of Tennessee Williams, Cat on a Hot Tin Roof).
- 1967 Nil Katrol Mal
- 1969 Hitha Honda Ammandi (The Good Woman of Setzuan, Bertolt Brecht)
- 1972 Dunna Dunu Gamuwe
- 1975 Thuranga Sanniya (The Horse, Julius Hay
- 1977 Nandivisala
- 1979 Mutu Kumari
- 1983 Esala Sanda Avanhala (The Teahouse of the August Moon)

, Vern Sneider )

- 1987 Maratsad (Marat/Sade, Peter Weiss)
- 1991 Santhuvara sebalano

== Published works ==
- Saibu nana (humor)
- Nil katrol mal (drama)
- 1948 Anoo Navaya (detective)
- 1963 Biththi Hatara (novel)
- 1968 Asura Nikakaya (novel)
- 1970 Ikbithi Siyaloloma Sathutin Jeewath uha (novel)
- 1972 Ane Devdath Noditi mokpura (poem)
- 1974 Dunna dunu gamuve (drama)
- 1975 Thuranga Sanniya (Horse by Julius Hay translation play)
- 1976 Ballo Bath kathi (novel)
- 1986 Ese veenam Minisune Asav (novel)
- 1988 Sonduru Akna dayaka Hevath Natya nishpadaka (academic)
- 1988 Ata messa (The Gadfly by Ethel Lilian Voynich translation novel)
- 1991 Hitler Ellla marai (novel)
- 1992 Marat Sade (Marat/Sade by Peter Weiss translation play)
- 1992 Hathara veni Thattuva (Death Is Part of the Process by Hilda Bernstein Translation novel)
- 1993 Handa Naluva Hevath Guvan viduli Nattya (academic)
- 1994 Godo Unnhehe Enakal (Waiting for Godot by Samuel Beckett translation play)
- 1994 Deiyampa Sahathika Eththa (Nothing But The Truth by Ramapada Chaudhury translation novel)
- 1997 Pavara nirindeku viya bambadath (novel)
- 1999 Harima badu hayak (Six Characters in Search of an Author by Luigi Pirandello translation play)
- 1999 Re bo wu ikbithi (When Night Falls by K.A. Abbas translation novel)
- 2002 Amuthu Ilandariya (Funny Boy by Shyam Selvadurai translation novel)
- 2002 Ginidalu mal (Flowers of Flame by Humayun Ahmed translation novel)
- 2002 Natya kruthi ekathuwa – palamu weluma (drama)
- 2012 Wellata giya geheniya (radio drama)

== Awards ==
- 1962 'Bodin karayo' best script and play National drama festival in Sri Lanka
- 1971 best literary prize 'Ikbithi Siyalloma Sathutin Jeevathvuha' .
- 1987 'Marat sad' best Translation and play National drama festival in Sri Lanka

== Scholarships ==
British government scholarship for study drama.
