= Sunanda Mahendra =

Sri Lankan academic

- Born: 28 January 1938 (age 87); Piliyandala, Sri Lanka
- Education: Dharmaraja College, Ananda College
- Alma mater: University of Kelaniya; University of Leicester
- Occupation(s): Poet, author
- Years active: 1962–present

Sunanda Mahendra De Mel (Sinhala: සුනන්ද මහේන්ද්‍ර; born 28 January 1938), popularly known as Sunanda Mahendra, is an author, and poet.

== Personal life ==
Mahendra was born on 28 January 1938 in Piliyandala.

== Career ==
Mahendra started to write news columns which were published in daily and weekly papers. He published the drama book Vineetha Hema becoming the first to publish a drama associated book in Sri Lanka. He published his maiden novel Hewaneli Eda Minissu which won State Literary Award for the best novel in 1964. In 1965, he translated Henrik Ibsen’s play Heddar Gabler as Geheniyak to Sinhala. During this period, he became a program producer in Radio Ceylon. Then he became a professional broadcaster on the BBC World Service, based in London, where he also read for his doctorate. He is the pioneer to bring BBC Sandeshaya to Sri Lankan listeners. In 1965, a monologue called Pitastharayo was produced which was originally a radio drama. His next stage play was Sayuren Aa Landa in 1967 starred by Malini Fonseka.

He wrote popular song lyrics for C.T. Fernando such as "Obage Thurulen Oba Dun Sihilen" and "Amathannata Heki Basak Soya". However the songs were released through radio after the death of Fernando in 1977. While in UK, he wrote the song "Kuda Devika" sung by Edmond Wickremasekera. In 1976, Mahendra made the play Jana Hathura. In 1979, he made the first autonomous play Pokuru Wessa. Later Wilson Gunaratne produced the remake of the play.

In 1980, he made several children’s and media books. In the meantime, he presented the popular radio program Vishwa Keerthiyata Pathwuuwo. The program involved many foreign personalities such as Darwin, Socrates, Dickens, Plato, D H Lawrence, Beethoven, Checkov, Gallileo, Homer which were discussed under socio-political frame work. Apart from that, he also presented the programs Geeyaka Rasa, Nirmana Vindana and Sahan Eliya. After his return from Poland to Sri Lanka, he published a book on Polish folk tales, Polantha Janakatha.

In 1990, Mahendra produced the biopic stage play Socrates. Since then, he became a full-time writer and made the newspaper series Second thoughts on Daily News. The series was later published as a book by the same name. In 1999, he made the plays Aesop and Checkhov Sandhyava.

== Awards ==
His book Ogha Tharanaya (The Crossing of the Torrential Stream) won the State Literary Award for the best Sinhala poetry collection in 2006. Many poems from the collection are now translated into English. He has won the State Literary Award for the best original play script (1993), the best research work (2002) and twice for the best Sinhala novels in 1964 and 2002. His outstanding contribution to his field of expertise, mass communication, earned him a UNESCO Copernicus award for Social Sciences in 1983. The play Socrates won eight awards including best state drama award in 1991.

- 1964 "Hevaneli eda minissu" best Sinhala Novel State Literary Award.
- 1990 Most outstanding Citizen Award. Lions International.
- 1992 "Socrates" best playscript State Literary Award
- 1993 "Socrates" eight awards State Drama Festival
- 2001 "Janakiyaman potha" best research State Literary Award
- 2002 "Niruwath Devivaru" best Sinhala Novel State Literary Award
- 2003 "Puranokthi Sangrahaya" merit State Literary Award
- 2004 "Chaya Pranthaya" best Sinhala Novel Godage Literary Award
- 2006 "Ogha Tharanaya" Best poetry collection State Literary Festival
- 2010 Professor Gunapala Malalasekara Memorial Award for life-time achievement of Buddhist literary contribution.
- 2008 Suta Kavi Buddhist Literary Award for Poetry
