= Neloufer de Mel =

Neloufer de Mel is a professor of English at the University of Colombo in Sri Lanka and a feminist scholar.

As a child, she attended Bishop's College, a private girls' school in Colombo. She holds a PhD from the University of Kent, where her 1990 dissertation was entitled "Responses to History: The Re-articulation of Postcolonial Identity in the Plays of Wole Soyinka & Derek Walcott 1950–76".

In 1999, de Mel was awarded a MacArthur Foundation grant; in 2009 she was a Fulbright Scholar at Yale University; and in 2019 she was a Dresden Senior Fellow at TU Dresden.

Much of her work has focused on cultural studies of postwar Sri Lanka from a perspective of feminism, justice, and the arts. She has written extensively on the militarization of Sri Lankan society during the quarter-century of ethnic war, and its lingering effects after the war's end.

De Mel is also interested in multidisciplinary studies of gender, literature, film, and performance art and has served on juries for literature and film prizes and festivals.

== Works ==
=== Books ===
- Women and the Nation's Narrative: Gender and Nationalism in Twentieth Century Sri Lanka (2001)
- Militarizing Sri Lanka: Popular Culture, Memory and Narrative in the Armed Conflict (2007)
