= Mahagama Sekara =

Sri Lankan writer

Mahagama Sekera (Mahagamage Sekera)
- Born: 7 April 1929; Radawana, Gampaha, Sri Lanka
- Died: 14 January 1976 (aged 46)
- Education: Government College of Fine Arts
- Children: 3
- Website: Official website

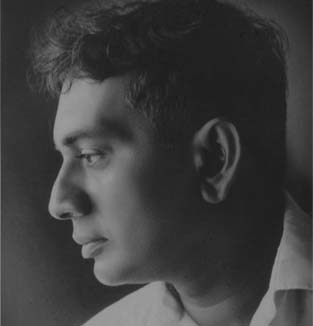
Mahagama Sekara(1929-1976)

Mahagama Sekera (Mahagamage Sekera) (Sinhala:මහගම සේකර / මහගමගේ සේකර) (7 April 1929 – 14 January 1976) was a famed Sri Lankan poet, lyricist, playwright, novelist, artist, translator and filmmaker. He is considered to be a groundbreaking figure in Sinhalese poetry and literature. He is best remembered as a poet and songwriter with several of his works even becoming popular songs in Sri Lanka. His works occasionally have an introspective Buddhist-influenced outlook. His poems and songs remain widely quoted on the island nearly thirty years after his death.

== Early life and education ==
Mahagama Sekera was born on 7 April 1929 in Radawana, Gampaha. His father was Maha Gamage John Singho, mother was Ranawaka Arachchige Roslin Ranawaka. He had his initial education at Government School in Radawana and Kirindiwela Maha Vidayalaya. Sekera started life as an artist and in his later paintings and book covers he tended towards modern art. He got a thorough grounding in the forms and techniques of formal art at the Government School of Fine Arts of which he later became the Principal. Thus at a young age he was exposed to new ways of looking at the world and perceiving reality which combined with the folk culture of his inheritance in a typical village milieu gave its particular strength to his world view.

Sekera started his doctoral studies at Vidyodaya University of Ceylon in 1974. His thesis on "Sinhala Gadya Padya Nirmana Kerehi Ridmaya Balapa Athi Akaraya" (Influence of Rhythm on the Sinhala Prose and Poetry) was submitted to the university in 1975. At the time of his death in 1976, he was attending to the final editing of the thesis as recommended by the supervisors. He was appointed as a teacher to Gampaha Bandaranayaka School, where he worked for few months.

== Bibliography ==
Mahagama Sekera started his artistic and creative career as a painter. He contributed to every branch of literature. He wrote short essays and plays to sinhala weekly papers and magazines, published several novels and poetry, and wrote over 100 songs. Many of his songs were vocalised and music directed by Pandit W. D. Amaradeva. He wrote and produced the musical play Swarnathilaka, which was critically acclaimed.

=== Poetry ===
- Vyanga (with K. Jayatillake)
- Sakwa Lihini
- Heta Irak Payai
- Mak Nisada Yath
- Rajathilaka Lionel saha Priyantha
- Bodima
- Nomiyemi
- Prabudda

=== Novels ===
- Thun Man Handiya
- Mrano Mandira
- Nomiyemi

=== Short stories ===
- Peethara
- Man Thananno
- Puthata Karekak
- Pungna
- Meeya

=== Films ===
- Thun Man Handiya

=== Plays ===
List of plays written by Sekera

- Swarnathilaka
- Daskon
- Kundalakesi
- Kantharaya
- Chora Pabbatha
- Vidura
- Sora Pawwa
- Sasa Jathakaya
- Hansa Geethaya
- Nava Baga Sanda
- Saddhantha
- Sabba Nadee Vankagatha
- Amaraneeyathvaya
- Mudu Puttu (with Gunasena Galappatthi)

=== Notable songs written by Sekera ===
- Sandakath Pini Diya - Sinhala: සඳකත් පිණිදිය දියවී ගලනා Music Composer Lionel Algama &
  Vocalist Dr Pandith W.D. Amaradeva from Sinhala movie Parasathu Mal
- Me Sinhala Apage Ratayi – Nanda Malini, music composer Pandit W. D. Amaradeva, from Sinhala film Saravita
- Sannaliyane – W. D. Amaradeva, music composer Pandit W. D. Amaradeva
- Seethala Diya Piri Sunila Vilai – Sunil Edirisinghe, music composer Dr. Rohana Weerasinghe
- Adawan Desin – Victor Ratnayake, music composer Somadasa Alvitigala, from Sinhala film Wes Gaththo
- Wakkada langa -w.d amaradeva
- Rathnadeepa Janmabhoomi
- Ase Mathuwena Kandulu Bindu Gena -W.D Amaradeva
- Siri Lanka Ratama Api
- "Mage deshaya awadhi karanu mena piyanani", a translation into Sinhala of the patriotic Rabindranath Tagore poem "Chitto Jetha Bhayshunyo"
- Etha Kandukara Himaw Arane - W. D. Amaradeva, music composer Lionel Algama
- Anna Balan Sanda - Edward Jayakody
- Dathe Karagata Simba Sanasannata - W. D. Amaradeva, Wimala Amaradewa

== Awards ==
- 1956 – Dina Dina Award for the painting Mahabinishkramana at the Annual Art Exhibition organised by the Jathika Kala Peramuna.
- 1965 – Merit Award for the Best Lyricist at the Film Festival of Lanka Industrial Exhibition for the song "Atha Gavu Ganan Durin" in Sinhala film Gatavarayo.
- 1968 – Award for the Best Lyric Writer for the song "Sinidu Sudu Mudu Thalave" composed for the film Sath Samudura (Directed by Dr Siri Gunasinghe) at the Sarasaviya Film Festival.
- 1970 – Receives the award for the Best Lyricist for his song "Ratakin Ratakata" in the Sinhala film Binaramalie at the Sarasaviya Film Festival.
- 1970 – Mahagama Sekera's film Thun Man Handiya receives the Friendship Award from Rajaye Lipikaru Seva Sangamaya.
- 1971 – Thun Man Handiya wins him the award for the Most Promising Director at the Awards Festival of the Film Critics and Journalists of Ceylon in 1970 – 1971.
- 1972 – Receives the Hela Vidu Saviya Kumaratunga Memorial Award for his Patriotic Songs.

== See also ==
- W.D. Amaradeva
- Sandakath Pini Diya
