= Meemana Premathilake =

Sri Lankan journalist and poet (1916–1965)

- මීමන ප්‍රේමතිලක
- Born: Karunaratne Premathilake; 20 September 1918; Horana, British Ceylon
- Died: 12 July 1965 (aged 46); Colombo, Sri Lanka
- Education: Taxila Central College; Ananda College
- Occupations: Poet, writer, journalist
- Years active: 1936–1965
- Spouse: Adeline Hathamune (m. 1942)
- Children: 6

Karunaratne Premathilake (Sinhala: මීමන ප්‍රේමතිලක; 20 September 1918 – 12 July 1965), popularly known as Meemana Premathilake was a prominent Sri Lankan poet, journalist and a writer. One of the most respected poets in Colombo era, Premathilake is notable as the founding editor of Sri Lanka's premier artistic newspaper 'Sarasaviya'.

== Personal life ==
Premathilake was born on 20 September 1918 in Meemana village in Horana, Sri Lanka. He started education from Taxila Central College, Horana and later from Vidyarathna Maha Pirivena in Horana. He came to Ananda College, Colombo for higher education at a time when he was gaining a reputation as a poet. He gave up higher education hopes after failing London Matriculation Exam.

On 20 April 1942, he married his longtime partner, Adeline Hathamune. The couple had two daughters: Ramani, Saroja and four sons: Sunil, Sarath, Saman and Sandun. Saman died in infancy. His three sons and daughter Ramani also worked at Lake House. Sunil Madhava Premathilaka is a member of the editorial board of 'Silumina'. Sarath Premathilaka became the editor of 'Kreeda' newspaper. While still in school, Sarath acted as a child actor in the films Sikuru Tharuwa and Parasathu Mal. Sandun Premathilaka, who was on the editorial board of 'Kreeda' newspaper, passed away prematurely. Sandun captained the First XI Team of Dharmapala Vidyalaya, Pannipitiya. Sunil and Sarath studied at Ananda College whereas Ramani and Saroja studied at the Visakha Vidyalaya, Colombo. Mihiri is a civil engineer in Australia.

On 10 July 1965, he was admitted to Ratnam Hospital and for two days he was in a coma. He died on 12 July 1965 at the age of 48. He was buried in Kanatte Cemetery. His wife Adeline died in May 2015 at the age of 94.

== Career ==
During his life as an Anandian, he made his first poetic essay Sri Lanka. Meemana wrote hundreds of poems for the Silumina newspaper but none of them were published. Undeterred, he continued to write. On the day of laying the foundation stone for Horana Sri Palee College by Indian poet Rabindranath Tagore and Wilmot A. Perera, a series of poems written by him under the title Govi Mahaththaya was published in 'Silumina' newspaper. During the World War period, he wrote a book of poetry full of humor. When he wrote a book of 16 pages of poetry and gave it to the Gunasena book shop, he received ten rupees. His poems were very popular among the soldiers during this period.

After completing his education, Premathilake became an amateur journalist in Silumina newspaper under the supervision of then chief editor Martin Wickramasinghe in 1936. Wickramasinghe gave a special place to his poetic essays on the poetry page. He wrote several poems on his beautiful village with the title Paalugama. During his tenure as the Feature Editor of Silumina, he wrote a feature entitled Lankawe Lassana Thaen. In 1941, he wrote the poetic essay Nildiye Nalangana. He also wrote the poem Miyunu Ella about a forest waterfall in Kukulu Korale. This is the first poem written about a natural beauty object in Sri Lanka. Describing his experience, he hid his name and published many poems including Ma Kavi Hadu Hati. During his journalist career, Meemana saw injustice and stood up against it where he resigned in 1953. However, due to his artistic poetry, he was later appointed the Deputy Editor of the Lankadeepa Editorial Board.

After resignation for the second time from Associated Newspapers of Ceylon Limited (ANCL or Lake House), he worked as a translator in the Department of Cooperative Development and the Ceylon Technical College. However, Meemana returned to Lake House from Lankadeepa shortly afterwards and in 1961 became the Editor-in-Chief of the Silumina newspaper. During his busy journalist career, he wrote several books such as Val Alin Saha Væddan Mæda, Sundara Lankāva, Eroppe Katā, Atheetha Sundariya, Vīnākāraya and three volumes Maṭa Hitena Hæṭi. Most of his poetry books have been published by P. K. W. Siriwardena in Maradana. The book of poems called Ethera was published by M. D. Gunasena after paid ten times more than Siriwardena Publications.

In 1963, he became the founding editor of 'Sarasaviya' newspaper. It is reported that the inaugural issue of 'Sarasaviya' was released on April 10, 1963, printing 50,000 copies. Three months after its inception, the post of 'Sarasaviya' Editor was handed over to Wimalasiri Perera. Premathilake later developed the newspaper and was its editor for 14 years. He also wrote the popular poetry Miyagiya Daruwek after the death of his son, Saman during infancy. In his 40s, he published his last book, an autobiography titled Magē Prēmaya Kalāva Hā Jīvitaya. Before being seriously ill and hospitalized, he wrote a series of poems to be published in the 'Sarasaviya' newspaper. The poetry titled Atheetha Smarana was published on 23 June 1965.

== Notable poetry ==
- Adaraya
- Aeth Vū Prēmaya
- Amba Mal
- Anangayā
- Andha Lamayā
- Aśōkamālā
- Atheetha Smaraṇa
- Ethera
- Gambada Tharuṇiya
- Jīvana Gangā
- Kirihāmi
- Kumudumatī
- Maraṇaya
- Minihā
- Miyagiya Daruwek
- Neḷum Kækuḷu
- Nildiye Nalangana
- Pāḷugama
- Pem Paḍura
- Pem Rājiṇī
- Rathi Sagaraya
- Sohon Bima
- Surapura
- Vanagata Kaviyā
- Yamuna
