= Ediriweera Sarachchandra =

Sri Lankan dramatist and playwright (1914–1996)

Dr. Ediriweera Sarachchandra
- මහාචාර්ය එදිරිවීර සරච්චන්ද්‍ර
- Born: 3 June 1914; Galle, Sri Lanka
- Died: 16 August 1996 (aged 82); Colombo, Sri Lanka
- Other names: Veditantirige Ediriweera Ranjitha Sarachchandra; Veditanthirige Eustace Reginold de Silva
- Education: St. Aloysius College; Richmond College (Sri Lanka); St. John's College; S. Thomas' College
- Alma mater: University of Colombo; University of London
- Years active: 1940–1996
- Spouses: Ailean Beleth; Lalitha Swarna Perera
- Children: 5
- Awards: Honorary D. Litt. from the University of Jaffna; Honorary D. Litt. from the University of Peradeniya; Kumaran Asan World Prize; Ramon Magsaysay Award

Sri Lankan Ambassador to France
- In office 1974–1977
- Website: sarachchandra.org

Veditantirige Ediriweera Ranjitha Sarachchandra (born Veditantirige Eustace Reginold de Silva; 3 June 1914 – 16 August 1996), popularly known as Ediriweera Sarachchandra (Sinhala: එදිරිවීර සරච්චන්ද්‍ර), was a Sri Lankan playwright, novelist, poet, literary critic, essayist and social commentator. Considered as the premier playwright in Sri Lanka, Sarachchandra produced several critically acclaimed theatre plays in a career spanning more than four decades. He also served as a senior lecturer at the University of Peradeniya for many years and as Sri Lankan Ambassador to France from 1974 to 1977.

== Personal life ==
Sarachchandra was born on 3 June 1914 in Dodanduwa, Rathgama, Galle, Sri Lanka. He completed his early education at Richmond College in Galle, St. John's College Panadura, S. Thomas' College, Mount Lavinia and St. Aloysius' College in Galle.

In 1939 Sarachchandra married Aileen Beleth. He later married Lalitha Swarna Perera, a producer of children's drama. Sarachchandra was the father of five children: Nanaditha, Sunethra, Kisagothami, Yashodhara and Ransi. His daughter Sunethra is also a popular actress in cinema, television and theatre who entered acting with her father's stage play Kapuwa Kapothii. Her performance in Ves Muhunu made her the best actress. Since then, she has received several state awards.

== Teaching career ==
Sarachchandra started his career as a teacher at St. Peter's College in Colombo 4. He then joined the publishing company Lake House in an administrative position. In 1933, he gained admission to Ceylon University College where he studied Pali, Sanskrit and Sinhala for the first degree, graduating in 1936 with first-class honors. Following his parents’ insistence, he sat for the Ceylon Civil Service examination and achieved first place in the country.

He subsequently travelled to Shantiniketan to study Indian philosophy and music. Sarachchandra returned to Sri Lanka in 1940 and resumed his teaching career at S. Thomas' College in Mt. Lavinia. From 1942 to 1944, he pursued a master’s degree in Indian philosophy as an external student of the University of London while serving as Sub-Editor of the Sinhala Dictionary. From 1947 - 1949, he served as a lecturer in Pali at the University of Ceylon. In 1949, he enrolled at the University of London to pursue a postgraduate degree in Western Philosophy.

== Career ==
Sarachchandra entered the world of drama around 1940 as a playwright influenced by the Western natural drama tradition. For the next decade, he focused on adapting Western natural dramas into Sinhala. During this period, he produced stage plays such as Mudalalige Peraliya (1943), Kapuwa Kapoti (1945), Hangi Hora (1949), Valaha, Magul Prasthava, and Manager (1950), all of which were adaptations of naturalistic Western drama.

In 1951, he produced Bahina Kalawa, his first entirely naturalistic creation. He followed this with three independent short naturalistic plays: Vala Ihagena Kema, Tharuna Lekakaya, and Sathwa Karunawa. In 1955, he created his longest natural drama, Wadinna Giya Devale, a semi-natural play incorporating two songs and based on a celebrated folk tale.

Sarachchandra’s concept of drama underwent a major transformation in the early 1950s. In 1952, he produced the semi-natural, semi-stylized play Pabawathi, marking his first step toward creating a distinctly local drama tradition. This was the first time his work incorporated Pothe Gura and songs.

He later studied in Eastern countries, including India and Japan. Upon returning, he produced his first fully stylized play, Maname, in 1956, which received widespread acclaim. Maname is generally regarded as the first true Sinhala drama, marking the transition from traditional Nadagam or folk drama to a modern theatrical format.

Following this success, Sarachchandra continued developing stylistic plays, producing Sinhabahu in 1961, widely considered his masterpiece. Drawing on the Nadagam tradition, he produced only these two fully stylized plays.

Following his critically acclaimed plays, Sarachchandra produced several dramas beyond the Nadagam tradition, including Kada Walalu (1958), Elova Gihin Melova Ava (1959), Hasthikantha Manthare (1959), Lomahansa Natakaya (1958), Mahasara (1968), Prematho Jayathi Soko (1969), Wesasanthara Natakaya (1980), and Bhava Kadathurava (1988). Many of these works were adaptations of Buddhist Jataka tales or Sinhala folklore, which contributed to their widespread and lasting popularity among audiences who identified with their cultural roots.

Sarachchandra followed a stylistic tradition that incorporated singing, playing, and dancing in his stage productions. Notably, the lyric drama Prematho Jayathi Soko, composed and first produced in 1969, was based on the classic poetry Swarnathilaka from Saddharmalankaraya. It was presented by the Sinhala Drama Board of the University of Ceylon, Peradeniya, and staged for a week from 25 February to 2 March 1969 at 8 p.m. at the Sukhawathie Theater (EOE Perera Theater) in the university’s Engineering Department.

In 1982, the University of Jaffna and the University of Peradeniya conferred Sarachchandra the degree of Doctor of Literature. The same year, he was made an Emeritus Professor at the University of Peradeniya. In 1983, the State of Kerala in South India honored him with the Kumaran Asan World Prize. In 1988, he won the Ramon Magsaysay Award for Literature. On 3 June 2014, Sarachchandra’s birth centenary was recognized by UNESCO, making him the first and only Sri Lankan artist to receive such recognition.

== Stage plays ==
- Bahina Kalawa
- Bhavakaḍaturāwa
- Elowa gihin Melowa Āwā
- Kada Walalu
- Kirimuttiya Gange Giya
- Lomahansa
- Mahasara
- Maname
- Mudalalige Peraliya
- Pabāvatī
- Prematho Jayathi Soko
- Raththaran
- Sinhabāhu
- Wessantara

== Author works ==
=== Novels ===
- Geethulata Hina (1959)
- Walmath Wee Hasarak Nudutimi (1962)
- Malawunge Awrudhuda (1965)
- Loku Putha Nohoth Bandulage Purawurthaya (1971)
- Heta Echchara Kaluwara Ne (1975)
- Wilasiniyakage Premaya (1988)
- Curfew and a Full Moon (1978)
- With the Begging Bowl (1986)
- Foam Upon the Stream (1987)

=== Short stories ===
- Redi nathi imesh(1971)
- Kalayage Awemen (1969)
- Maya Roopaya (1974)
- Roopa Sundari (1984)
- Midiya, Gruhaniya ha Upasikawa (1993)
- Of a Queen and a Courtesan (1970)
- The Death of a Friend (1981)

=== Research, Literary Theory and Criticism ===
- Sahithya Vidyawa (1949)
- Sinhala Nawakatha Ithihasaya ha Wicharaya (1951)
- Kalpana Lokaya (1958)
- Natya Gaweshana (1967)
- Wes Muhunuda Sebe Muhunuda? (1971)
- Modern Sinhalese Fiction (1943)
- The Sinhalese Novel (1950)
- The Folk Drama of Ceylon (1952)
- Buddhist Psychology of Perception (1958)

=== Other ===
- Ape Withthi (1942)
- Asampurna Charika Satahan (1967)
- Dharmishta Samajaya (1982)
- Pin Ethi Sarasawi Waramak Denne (1985)

== See also ==
- Theatre of Sri Lanka
- Sri Lankan Non Career Diplomats
