= Zoysa =

Zoysa or de Zoysa is a surname. Notable people with the surname include:

- A. C. de Zoysa, Sri Lankan lawyer
- A. P. de Zoysa (1890–1968), Sri Lankan social reformer
- Asoka De Zoysa Gunawardana, Sri Lankan judge
- Arthur de Zoysa, Ceylonese statesman
- Chintaka de Zoysa, Sri Lankan sprinter
- Cyril de Zoysa (1896–1978), Sri Lankan industrialist
- Dinesh de Zoysa (born 1977), Sri Lankan cricketer
- Felix R. de Zoysa, Sri Lankan businessman
- Francis de Zoysa, Sri Lankan lawyer
- Gihan de Zoysa, Sri Lankan cricketer
- G. R. de Zoysa, Ceylonese politician
- Ian de Zoysa, Sri Lankan politician
- Indrasena de Zoysa, Sri Lankan politician
- Louis de Zoysa, English convicted murderer
- Lucien de Zoysa, Ceylonese cricketer, actor and playwright
- Maduranga Zoysa (born 1984), Sri Lankan cricketer
- Manjula de Zoysa, Sri Lankan cricketer
- Michael de Zoysa, Sri Lankan cricketer
- M. P. de Zoysa, Sri Lankan politician
- M. P. de Zoysa Siriwardena, Ceylonese politician
- Nihal Zoysa, Sri Lankan cricketer
- Nimmi de Zoysa, Sri Lankan sprinter
- Nuwan Zoysa (born 1978), Sri Lankan cricketer
- Prabath de Zoysa, Sri Lankan cricketer
- Ranjith de Zoysa, Sri Lankan politician
- Richard de Zoysa (1958–1990), Sri Lankan journalist
- Sameera de Zoysa, Sri Lankan cricketer
- Stanley de Zoysa, Sri Lankan politician
- Sudheera de Zoysa, Sri Lankan cricketer
- Sydney de Zoysa (1909–1994), Sri Lankan police officer
- Thushendra de Zoysa, Sri Lankan cricketer

== See also ==
- (de) Soysa, a surname
