= Viragaya =

Novel by Martin Wickremasinghe

- Author: Martin Wickremasinghe
- Original title: විරාගය
- Translator: Ashley Halpe
- Language: Sinhala
- Genre: Psychological novel
- Publication date: 1956
- Publication place: Sri Lanka
- Media type: Print (paperback)

Viragaya (Devoid of Passions) is a 1956 novel written by Martin Wickremasinghe. The novel is considered an outstanding work in modern Sinhalese fiction due to the significance of its theme and the sophistication of its technique. The story is based on a virtuous character called Aravinda, a Sinhalese youth raised in a traditional Buddhist family in the South.

First published in 1956 in Sinhala, the novel was translated into English language in 1985 by Professor Ashley Halpe, under the title The Way of the Lotus. It was later translated into the Tamil language in 1992 and French in 1995. Viragaya is considered as the first Sinhala novel which was completely translated and published in the French language. The novel was made into a movie in 1987 by Tissa Abeysekera. Viragaya is considered one of the best novels of the writer. It exhibits the influences of Existentialism on Wickramasinghe specially through the character of Lokusuriya, the retired postmaster. Sarojini, Menaka, Bathee, Siridasa are the other prominent characters in the novel. The novel is presented through Sammy, a friend of Aravinda's cousin Siridasa. The narration resembles that of Lockwood in Emily Brontë's Wuthering Heights.

== Plot ==
The novel starts with Sammy, a common friend of Aravinda Jayasena and Siridasa Jayasena, visiting Siridasa. Siridasa and his wife, Sarojini welcome Sammy and relays him the news of Aravinda's death. Sammy is interested in mysticism and occultism which compelled him to travel India. He shares Aravinda's passion of metaphysics, ancient lore and alchemy. Sammy is grief stricken to hear the death of Aravinda at a relatively young age. Siridasa tells him of the final days of Aravinda and gives him a book which appeared to be the Aravinda's diary. The narration then shifts to first person and the reader meets Aravinda. Aravinda starts his story with a special introduction of his father who works as a local physician (Veda Mahattaya) to make the ends meet. Commonly known as Jayasena Veda Mahattaya, Aravinda's father is sought after by villagers when someone is ill. He visits them and treat them with traditional ayurvedic medication which he makes a servant produce at his own house. Aravinda then recalls Sarojini, a classmate of Aravinda and a daughter of a wealthy merchant. Sarojini expresses her interest in Aravinda and two enjoy each other's company. Aravinda's elder sister Menaka is married to Dharmadasa. Aravinda is forced to take biology to be a doctor but he declines to be one and becomes a government clerk. Meanwhile Sarojini proposes him to elope and start a family, but Aravainda does not accept the proposal. Grief stricken Sarojini agrees with her parents to marry Siridasa, Aravinda's cousin. Aravinda's father dies and his mother finds out that her husband has mortgaged the house to Dharmadasa for three thousand rupees. Frustrated mother leaves the house despite her daughter's pleas that she and Aravinda can stay at their home until they die. After the departure of mother, Menaka and Dharamada move house to Aravinda's place. Aravinds pursues his career at the government office. One day, he accidentally makes an explosion in his own room while trying new chemical experiments. Realising that he is a threat to his own nephew, Sirimal, Menaka and Dharmada's son, he decides to leave the house and to rent a place. He employs Gunawathi as housemaid who has a ten year old girl named Bathee with whom Aravinda builds up a father-daughter relationship. Aravinda gives her a school education despite the criticisms of his elder sister Menaka. Kulasuriya, a retired postmaster who wanders in the village aimlessly encourages Aravinda's existentialist ideology and they enjoy each other's company. Now Bathee is grown up and she is in love with a driver named Jinadasa. Aravinda is jealous and worried to see that Bathee'a attention is completely diverted to Jinadasa. Aravinda asks Jinadasa to meet him and buys him a used car and marries him off to Bathee. After their marriage, Aravinda falls ill and Jinadasa and Bathee come to nurse him. Sarojini comes to visit Aravinda and he admits that he had both loved and not loved Sarojini and Bathee. Aravinda's illness worsened and he ponders his own life. Aravinda makes peace with himself and he is detached from all the worldly relationships drawing the title of the novel Viragaya (detachment). Aravinda passes away and people come in numbers to pay last tribute to Aravinda; the writer alludes that the villagers have intuitively understood Aravinda's good qualities even though he is ridiculed and criticised by the middle class in society.

== See also ==
- Gamperaliya
- Madol Doova
- Yuganthaya
- Kaliyugaya
