= Kaliyugaya (film) =

1981 film by Lester James Peries

- Punya Heendeniya as Nanda and Henry Jayasena (as Piyal) in a scene from the film
- Directed by: Lester James Peries
- Written by: A.J. Gunawardena
- Starring: Punya Heendeniya; Henry Jayasena; Trilicia Gunawardena; Wickrema Bogoda
- Cinematography: Donald Karunarathne
- Edited by: Gladwin Fernando
- Music by: Premasiri Khemadasa
- Distributed by: Tharanga Films
- Release date: 1982
- Running time: 85 minutes
- Country: Sri Lanka
- Language: Sinhala

Kaliyugaya is a 1981 Sri Lankan drama film directed by Lester James Peries; it was adapted from the novel Kaliyugaya by Martin Wickramasinghe, and follows the events of the film Gamperaliya. It was followed by the film adaptation of the third novel in Wickramasinghe's trilogy, Yuganthaya, in 1983.

It was a Director's Fortnight selection at the 1982 Cannes Film Festival

== Synopsis ==
Piyal (Henry Jayasena) and Nanda (Punya Heendeniya) from Gamperaliya have now aged, and their children, Alan, Chandrasoma and Nalika have left them. Nanda reminisces on her life after her son sends her a letter from London, accusing her and her husband of various faults.

== Production ==
The film features the four main actors of Gamperaliya; it was shot on 35mm and used Eastmancolor. The film also featured the famous stately home Lakshmigiri.

== Cast ==
- Henry Jayasena as Piyal
- Punya Heendeniya as Nanda
- Wickrama Bogoda as Tissa
- Trilicia Gunawardena as Anula
- Sanath Gunathilake as Alan
- Anoja Weerasinghe as Irene
- Asoka Peiris as Friend
- Tony Ranasinghe as Doctor
- Kamal Addararachchi
- Nawanandana Wijesinghe
- S. A. Jamis
- Tissa Udangamuwa
- Leena de Silva
- A. J. de Soysa
- Lal Peiris
- Sampath Wijesinghe
