= Stichting Weeshuis Sri Lanka =

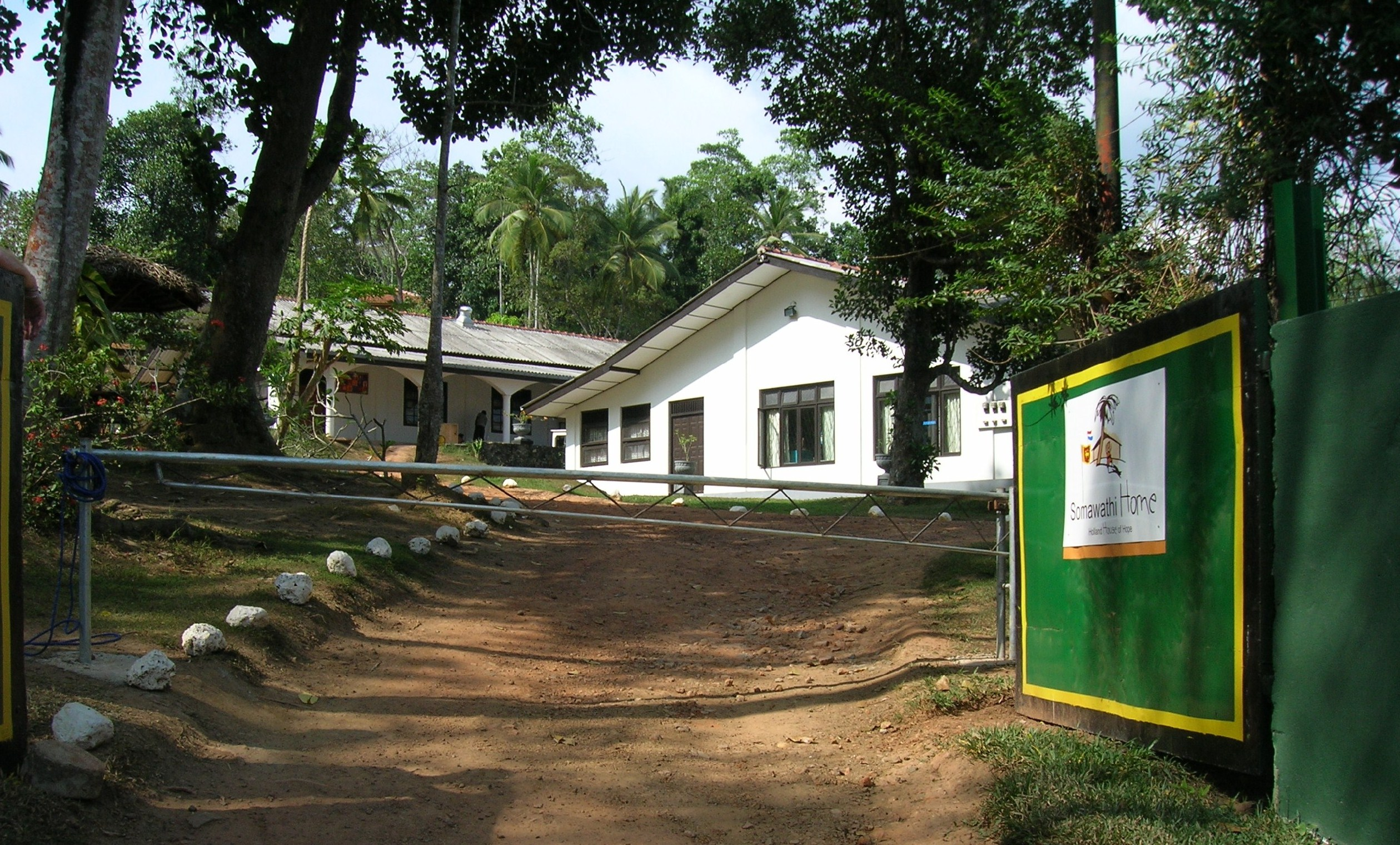
Orphanage in Sri Lanka.

Stichting Weeshuis Sri Lanka is a Dutch NGO-foundation that after the disastrous tsunami of December 26, 2004 was founded to help the children that became orphans.

Marja van Leeuwen, a private volunteer, was the first to arrive in Sri Lanka from The Netherlands, with medical supplies. She brought them to Galle in the southern part of Sri Lanka, where she knew a doctor who had called her with a plea for medicines. That was almost two days after the disaster. There she found out that she could put her efforts in taking care of the orphans. On January 1, 2005, she gave an interview about what she had seen, on the TV show that was broadcast by all broadcasters that day. She got an enormous response from the Dutch public, and that month 11 sea containers were shipped to Sri Lanka.

The orphanage was going to be built in Koggala, which is approximately eight kilometres away from Galle. She got a 20,000 km^{2} large land with some old properties from a local family for use of the planned orphanage. The buildings got repaired and new buildings were built by volunteers and local craftsmen, so that they could earn some living. The property also includes a dentist-practise, a pharmacy and a First Aid post as well as a polyclinic for the region.

There are now 127 children that live at the orphanage, but more children from the region are helped by the foundation by financial support given for education purposes. They learn English, the use of computers and skills that help them not to end up as pole fishermen.

== NCPA ==
The NCPA (The childprotection agency in Sri Lanka) released the numbers of children who lost either one or both parents by the tsunami:

Region	Both parents deceased	Mother deceased	Father deceased
Galle:	33	82	37
Matara:	21	103	103
Hambantota:	46	175	172
