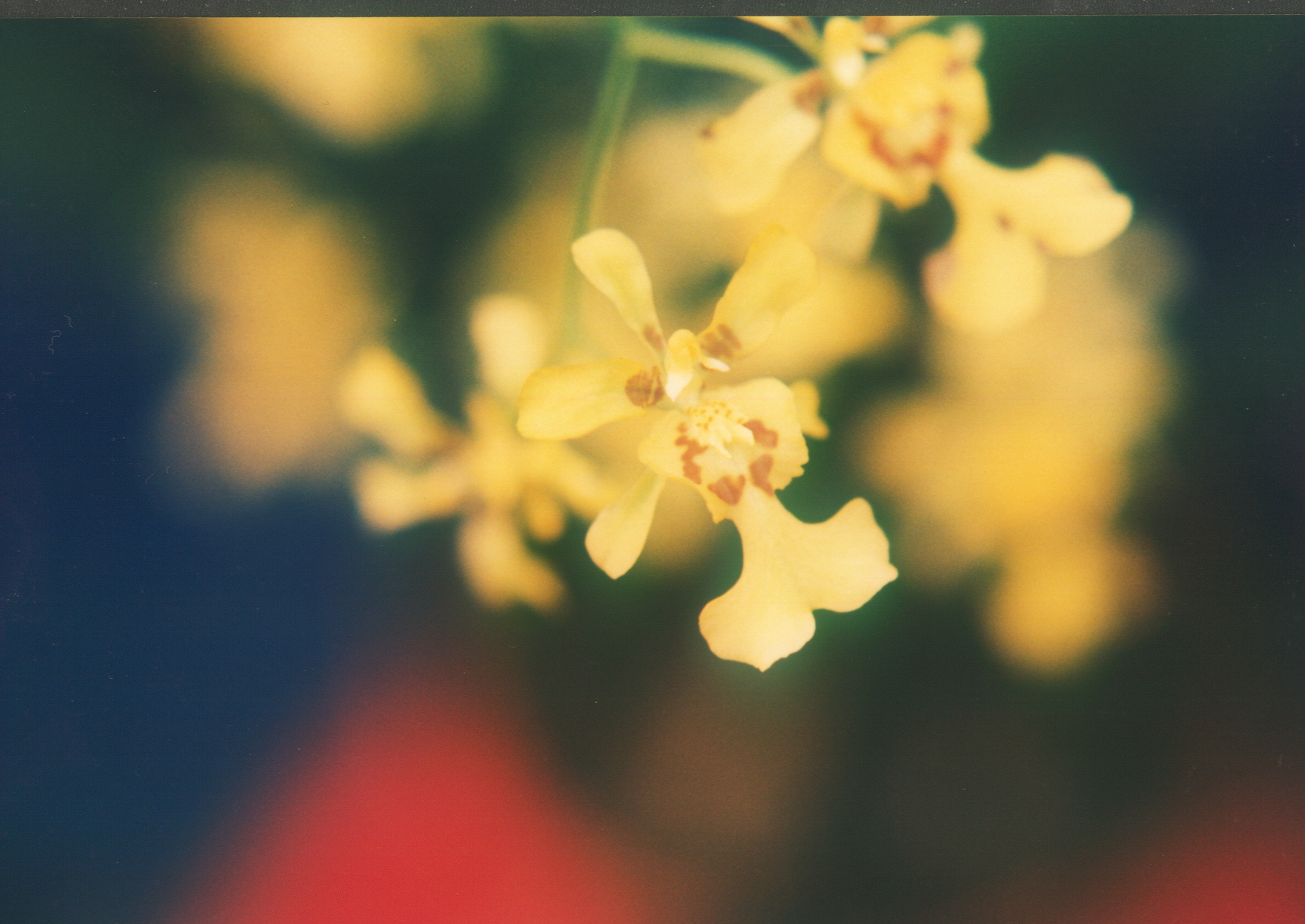

Scientific classification
- Kingdom: Plantae
- Clade: Tracheophytes
- Clade: Angiosperms
- Clade: Monocots
- Order: Asparagales
- Family: Orchidaceae
- Subfamily: Epidendroideae
- Genus: Oncidium
- Species: O. klotzschianum

Binomial name
- Oncidium klotzschianum Rchb.f.

Synonyms
- Oncidium obryzatum Rchb.f. & Warsz.; Oncidium meliosmum Rchb.f.; Oncidium angustisepalum Kraenzl.; Oncidium floribundum Rchb.f. ex Kraenzl.; Oncidium fulgens Schltr.; Oncidium microcachrys Rchb.f. ex Kraenzl.; Oncidium varians Schltr.; Oncidium hoppii Schltr.; Oncidium multiflorum Soysa

= Oncidium klotzschianum =

Species of orchid

Oncidium klotzschianum is a species of orchid occurring from Costa Rica to Peru and Venezuela. In the mountains of western Panama, it is the most abundant and conspicuous species.
