= Ja Ela Polling Division =

Polling division in Gampaha District, Sri Lanka

Ja Ela
- Polling Division
- Coordinates: 7.069842°N 79.910999°E
- Country: Sri Lanka
- Province: Western Province
- Electoral District: Gampaha Electoral District

Area
  - Total: 67.13 km^{2} (25.92 sq mi)

Population (2024) (Note: Census figures are for the Ja-Ela Divisional Secretary's Division, in which the polling division's areas are located.)
  - Total: 204,806

The Ja Ela Polling Division is a polling division in the Gampaha Electoral District, in the Western Province of Sri Lanka. It takes its name from the town of Ja-Ela and consists of areas in the Ja-Ela Divisional Secretary's Division. Ja-Ela was previously a parliamentary constituency known as the Ja-Ela Electoral District until the 1978 Constitution replaced the constituency system with proportional representation in 22 electoral districts.

== Presidential Election Results ==
=== Summary ===
The winner of Ja Ela has matched the final country result 9 out of 9 times. Hence, Ja Ela is a Perfect Bellwether for Presidential Elections.

Year	Ja Ela	Gampaha Electoral District	MAE %	Sri Lanka	MAE %
2024	NPP	NPP	—	NPP	—
2019	SLPP	SLPP	0.36%	SLPP	6.75%
2015	NDF	NDF	2.11%	NDF	0.45%
2010	UPFA	UPFA	3.38%	UPFA	0.52%
2005	UPFA	UPFA	2.84%	UPFA	1.46%
1999	PA	PA	0.27%	PA	4.76%
1994	PA	PA	0.99%	PA	1.26%
1988	UNP	SLFP	4.32%	UNP	1.39%
1982	UNP	UNP	5.38%	UNP	3.39%
Matches/Mean MAE (Note: Mean MAE covers the 1982 to 2019 elections only.)	9/9	8/9	2.46%	9/9	2.50%

=== 2024 Sri Lankan Presidential Election ===
No candidate won more than half of the valid votes in the first count, so preference votes were counted. The table shows first-count votes. In the final count, Anura Kumara Dissanayake received 5,740,179 votes and Sajith Premadasa 4,530,902.

Party	Ja Ela		Gampaha Electoral District		Sri Lanka	
Party	Votes	%	Votes	%	Votes	%
NPP	71,351	58.49%	809,410	55.50%	5,634,915	42.31%
SJB	27,567	22.60%	349,550	23.97%	4,363,035	32.76%
Independent (Ranil Wickremesinghe)	16,907	13.86%	216,028	14.81%	2,299,767	17.27%
SLPP	2,917	2.39%	41,193	2.82%	342,781	2.57%
SLCP	1,550	1.27%	17,143	1.18%	122,396	0.92%
Other Parties	1,698	1.39%	25,065	1.72%	556,722	4.18%
Valid Votes	121,990	98.08%	1,458,389	98.03%	13,319,616	97.80%
Rejected Votes	2,384	1.92%	29,381	1.97%	300,300	2.20%
Total Polled	124,374	76.09%	1,487,770	79.09%	13,619,916	79.46%
Registered Electors	163,461		1,881,129		17,140,354	

=== 2019 Sri Lankan Presidential Election ===
Party	Ja Ela		Gampaha Electoral District		Sri Lanka	
Party	Votes	%	Votes	%	Votes	%
SLPP	71,690	58.76%	855,870	59.28%	6,924,255	52.25%
NDF	41,649	34.14%	494,671	34.26%	5,564,239	41.99%
NMPP	5,556	4.55%	61,760	4.28%	418,553	3.16%
Other Parties (with < 1%)	1,575	1.29%	20,227	1.40%	295,797	2.23%
NPP	1,527	1.25%	11,272	0.78%	49,655	0.37%
Valid Votes	121,997	98.69%	1,443,800	98.92%	13,252,499	98.99%
Rejected Votes	1,625	1.31%	15,751	1.08%	135,452	1.01%
Total Polled	123,622	80.71%	1,459,551	83.31%	13,387,951	83.72%
Registered Electors	153,164		1,751,892		15,992,096	

=== 2015 Sri Lankan Presidential Election ===
Party	Ja Ela		Gampaha Electoral District		Sri Lanka	
Party	Votes	%	Votes	%	Votes	%
NDF	58,669	52.01%	669,007	49.83%	6,217,162	51.28%
UPFA	53,481	47.41%	664,347	49.49%	5,768,090	47.58%
Other Parties (with < 1%)	647	0.57%	9,142	0.68%	138,200	1.14%
Valid Votes	112,797	98.62%	1,342,496	98.92%	12,123,452	98.85%
Rejected Votes	1,584	1.38%	14,647	1.08%	140,925	1.15%
Total Polled	114,381	79.52%	1,357,143	82.88%	12,264,377	81.52%
Registered Electors	143,843		1,637,537		15,044,490	

=== 2010 Sri Lankan Presidential Election ===
Party	Ja Ela		Gampaha Electoral District		Sri Lanka	
Party	Votes	%	Votes	%	Votes	%
UPFA	56,726	58.31%	718,716	61.66%	6,015,934	57.88%
NDF	39,701	40.81%	434,506	37.28%	4,173,185	40.15%
Other Parties (with < 1%)	852	0.88%	12,426	1.07%	204,494	1.97%
Valid Votes	97,279	99.29%	1,165,648	99.24%	10,393,613	99.03%
Rejected Votes	692	0.71%	8,960	0.76%	101,838	0.97%
Total Polled	97,971	76.65%	1,174,608	79.66%	10,495,451	74.50%
Registered Electors	127,821		1,474,464		14,088,500	

=== 2005 Sri Lankan Presidential Election ===
Party	Ja Ela		Gampaha Electoral District		Sri Lanka (Note: Registered electors are the sum of the 22 district figures, as the all-island table gives no total.)	
Party	Votes	%	Votes	%	Votes	%
UPFA	46,950	51.96%	596,698	54.78%	4,887,152	50.29%
UNP	42,606	47.15%	481,764	44.23%	4,706,366	48.43%
Other Parties (with < 1%)	806	0.89%	10,815	0.99%	123,521	1.27%
Valid Votes	90,362	98.93%	1,089,277	98.94%	9,717,039	98.88%
Rejected Votes	973	1.07%	11,724	1.06%	109,869	1.12%
Total Polled	91,335	78.04%	1,101,001	80.71%	9,826,908	73.74%
Registered Electors	117,040		1,364,180		13,327,160	

=== 1999 Sri Lankan Presidential Election ===
Party	Ja Ela		Gampaha Electoral District		Sri Lanka	
Party	Votes	%	Votes	%	Votes	%
PA	44,098	56.64%	532,796	56.58%	4,312,157	51.12%
UNP	29,726	38.18%	353,969	37.59%	3,602,748	42.71%
JVP	3,089	3.97%	40,472	4.30%	344,173	4.08%
Other Parties (with < 1%)	939	1.21%	14,382	1.53%	176,676	2.09%
Valid Votes	77,852	97.79%	941,619	97.84%	8,435,754	97.69%
Rejected Votes	1,759	2.21%	20,768	2.16%	199,536	2.31%
Total Polled	79,611	76.49%	962,387	78.31%	8,635,290	73.31%
Registered Electors	104,076		1,228,908		11,779,200	

=== 1994 Sri Lankan Presidential Election ===
Party	Ja Ela		Gampaha Electoral District		Sri Lanka	
Party	Votes	%	Votes	%	Votes	%
PA	44,166	63.80%	550,654	64.74%	4,709,205	62.28%
UNP	24,260	35.04%	288,608	33.93%	2,715,283	35.91%
Other Parties (with < 1%)	804	1.16%	11,256	1.32%	137,038	1.81%
Valid Votes	69,230	98.38%	850,518	98.48%	7,561,526	98.03%
Rejected Votes	1,141	1.62%	13,137	1.52%	151,706	1.97%
Total Polled	70,371	72.32%	863,655	75.71%	7,713,232	70.47%
Registered Electors	97,305		1,140,808		10,945,065	

=== 1988 Sri Lankan Presidential Election ===
Party	Ja Ela		Gampaha Electoral District		Sri Lanka	
Party	Votes	%	Votes	%	Votes	%
UNP	30,021	52.54%	350,092	48.08%	2,569,199	50.43%
SLFP	25,357	44.37%	355,553	48.83%	2,289,860	44.95%
SLMP	1,766	3.09%	22,467	3.09%	235,719	4.63%
Valid Votes	57,144	98.19%	728,112	98.64%	5,094,778	98.24%
Rejected Votes	1,052	1.81%	10,054	1.36%	91,445	1.76%
Total Polled	58,196	71.35%	738,166	76.12%	5,186,223	55.32%
Registered Electors	81,566		969,735		9,375,742	

=== 1982 Sri Lankan Presidential Election ===
Party	Ja Ela		Gampaha Electoral District		Sri Lanka	
Party	Votes	%	Votes	%	Votes	%
UNP	32,420	58.20%	365,838	52.50%	3,450,811	52.91%
SLFP	21,074	37.83%	301,808	43.31%	2,548,438	39.07%
JVP	1,683	3.02%	23,701	3.40%	273,428	4.19%
Other Parties	532	0.95%	5,491	0.79%	249,470	3.82%
Valid Votes	55,709	99.13%	696,838	99.15%	6,522,147	98.78%
Rejected Votes	488	0.87%	5,992	0.85%	80,470	1.22%
Total Polled	56,197	80.71%	702,830	84.14%	6,602,617	81.06%
Registered Electors	69,624		835,265		8,145,015	

== Parliamentary Election Results ==
=== Summary ===
The winner of Ja Ela has matched the final country result 9 out of 9 times. Hence, Ja Ela is a Bellwether for Parliamentary Elections.

Year	Ja Ela	Gampaha Electoral District	MAE %	Sri Lanka	MAE %
2024	NPP	NPP	—	NPP	—
2020	SLPP	SLPP	—	SLPP	—
2015	UNP	UNP	2.92%	UNP	2.48%
2010	UPFA	UPFA	5.82%	UPFA	3.72%
2004	UPFA	UPFA	2.16%	UPFA	3.53%
2001	UNP	UNP	1.58%	UNP	1.75%
2000	PA	PA	1.43%	PA	1.62%
1994	PA	PA	1.33%	PA	3.53%
1989	UNP	UNP	6.90%	UNP	6.30%
Matches/Mean MAE (Note: Mean MAE covers the 1989 to 2015 elections only.)	9/9	9/9	3.16%	9/9	3.28%

=== 2024 Sri Lankan Parliamentary Election ===
Party	Ja Ela		Gampaha Electoral District		Sri Lanka	
Party	Votes	%	Votes	%	Votes	%
NPP	77,507	74.02%	898,759	72.76%	6,863,186	61.56%
SJB	12,813	12.24%	150,445	12.18%	1,968,716	17.66%
SLPP	3,752	3.58%	49,516	4.01%	350,429	3.14%
NDF	3,451	3.30%	47,512	3.85%	500,835	4.49%
UDV	2,013	1.92%	22,439	1.82%	N/A	N/A
SB	1,884	1.80%	25,939	2.10%	178,006	1.60%
Other Parties	3,294	3.15%	40,702	3.29%	1,286,834 (Note: Includes UDV. The all-island result lists only parties that won seats, so it gives no national figure for UDV.)	11.54%
Valid Votes	104,714	95.25%	1,235,312	94.52%	11,148,006	94.35%
Rejected Votes	5,218	4.75%	71,640	5.48%	667,240	5.65%
Total Polled	109,932	67.34%	1,306,952	69.48%	11,815,246	68.93%
Registered Electors	163,256		1,881,129		17,140,354	

=== 2020 Sri Lankan Parliamentary Election ===
Party	Ja Ela		Gampaha Electoral District		Sri Lanka	
Party	Votes	%	Votes	%	Votes	%
SLPP	67,798	64.92%	807,896	65.76%	6,853,693	59.09%
SJB	25,723	24.63%	285,809	23.27%	2,771,984	23.90%
NPP	5,944	5.69%	61,833	5.03%	445,958	3.84%
UNP	2,022	1.94%	28,282	2.30%	249,435	2.15%
OPPP	1,147	1.10%	21,627	1.76%	67,758	0.58%
Other Parties	1,800	1.72%	23,027	1.87%	1,210,108	10.43%
Valid Votes	104,434	94.35%	1,228,474	94.21%	11,598,936	93.97%
Rejected Votes	6,258	5.65%	75,509	5.79%	744,373	6.03%
Total Polled	110,692	70.96%	1,303,983	73.01%	12,343,309	75.89%
Registered Electors	156,003		1,785,964		16,263,885	

=== 2015 Sri Lankan Parliamentary Election ===
Party	Ja Ela		Gampaha Electoral District		Sri Lanka	
Party	Votes	%	Votes	%	Votes	%
UNP	51,807	49.81%	577,004	47.13%	5,098,916	45.66%
UPFA	43,051	41.39%	549,958	44.92%	4,732,664	42.38%
JVP	8,333	8.01%	87,880	7.18%	544,154	4.87%
Other Parties	827	0.80%	9,559	0.78%	791,451	7.09%
Valid Votes	104,018	96.05%	1,224,401	95.61%	11,167,185	95.58%
Rejected Votes	4,283	3.95%	56,246	4.39%	516,926	4.42%
Total Polled	108,301	75.29%	1,280,647	78.21%	11,684,111	77.66%
Registered Electors	143,843		1,637,537		15,044,490	

=== 2010 Sri Lankan Parliamentary Election ===
Party	Ja Ela		Gampaha Electoral District		Sri Lanka	
Party	Votes	%	Votes	%	Votes	%
UPFA	43,920	56.80%	589,476	63.37%	4,846,388	60.33%
UNP	26,397	34.14%	266,523	28.65%	2,357,057	29.34%
DNA	6,544	8.46%	69,747	7.50%	441,251	5.49%
Other Parties	468	0.61%	4,487	0.48%	389,021	4.84%
Valid Votes	77,329	94.84%	930,233	94.88%	8,033,717	93.08%
Rejected Votes	4,208	5.16%	50,234	5.12%	596,972	6.92%
Total Polled	81,537	63.79%	980,467	66.50%	8,630,689	61.26%
Registered Electors	127,821		1,474,464		14,088,500	

=== 2004 Sri Lankan Parliamentary Election ===
Party	Ja Ela		Gampaha Electoral District		Sri Lanka	
Party	Votes	%	Votes	%	Votes	%
UPFA	42,453	50.65%	509,963	51.51%	4,223,970	45.60%
UNP	34,248	40.86%	367,572	37.13%	3,504,200	37.83%
JHU	6,009	7.17%	102,516	10.36%	552,724	5.97%
Other Parties	1,106	1.32%	9,951	1.01%	981,838	10.60%
Valid Votes	83,816	96.55%	990,002	95.98%	9,262,732	94.54%
Rejected Votes	2,997	3.45%	41,462	4.02%	534,948	5.46%
Total Polled	86,813	76.45%	1,031,464	77.72%	9,797,680	75.96%
Registered Electors	113,559		1,327,145		12,899,139	

=== 2001 Sri Lankan Parliamentary Election ===
Party	Ja Ela		Gampaha Electoral District		Sri Lanka	
Party	Votes	%	Votes	%	Votes	%
UNP	38,219	45.57%	437,289	43.94%	4,086,026	45.62%
PA	34,522	41.16%	428,780	43.08%	3,330,815	37.19%
JVP	9,856	11.75%	113,990	11.45%	815,353	9.10%
Other Parties	1,273	1.52%	15,171	1.52%	723,675	8.08%
Valid Votes	83,870	97.08%	995,230	96.30%	8,955,869	94.77%
Rejected Votes	2,524	2.92%	38,187	3.70%	493,944	5.23%
Total Polled	86,394	78.68%	1,033,417	80.36%	9,449,813	76.03%
Registered Electors	109,799		1,285,973		12,428,762	

=== 2000 Sri Lankan Parliamentary Election ===
Party	Ja Ela		Gampaha Electoral District		Sri Lanka	
Party	Votes	%	Votes	%	Votes	%
PA	38,150	47.55%	470,018	48.87%	3,900,901	45.11%
UNP	33,089	41.24%	378,328	39.34%	3,477,770	40.22%
JVP	6,198	7.72%	73,110	7.60%	518,774	6.00%
SU	2,180	2.72%	20,297	2.11%	127,863	1.48%
Other Parties	622	0.78%	19,956	2.08%	622,360	7.20%
Valid Votes	80,239	N/A	961,709	96.26%	8,647,668	94.73%
Rejected Votes	N/A	N/A	37,390	3.74%	481,155	5.27%
Total Polled	N/A	N/A	999,099	79.71%	9,128,823	75.63%
Registered Electors	N/A		1,253,416		12,071,062	

=== 1994 Sri Lankan Parliamentary Election ===
Party	Ja Ela		Gampaha Electoral District		Sri Lanka	
Party	Votes	%	Votes	%	Votes	%
PA	40,838	55.44%	509,030	56.79%	3,887,823	48.94%
UNP	31,851	43.24%	375,631	41.91%	3,498,370	44.04%
SLPF	970	1.32%	11,627	1.30%	90,078	1.13%
Other Parties	0	0.00%	0	0.00%	467,435	5.88%
Valid Votes	73,659	96.63%	896,288	96.39%	7,943,706	95.20%
Rejected Votes	2,567	3.37%	33,553	3.61%	400,389	4.80%
Total Polled	76,226	78.34%	929,841	81.51%	8,344,095	76.24%
Registered Electors	97,305		1,140,808		10,945,065	

=== 1989 Sri Lankan Parliamentary Election ===
Party	Ja Ela		Gampaha Electoral District		Sri Lanka	
Party	Votes	%	Votes	%	Votes	%
UNP	34,415	61.53%	385,733	54.14%	2,838,005	50.71%
SLFP	19,230	34.38%	294,490	41.34%	1,785,369	31.90%
USA	1,901	3.40%	21,665	3.04%	160,271	2.86%
Other Parties	390	0.70%	10,549	1.48%	812,823	14.52%
Valid Votes	55,936	95.49%	712,437	95.64%	5,596,468	93.87%
Rejected Votes	2,640	4.51%	32,497	4.36%	365,563	6.13%
Total Polled	58,576	73.12%	744,934	76.82%	5,962,031	63.60%
Registered Electors	80,113		969,658		9,374,164	

== Demographics ==
=== Ethnicity ===
In the 2024 census, the Ja-Ela Divisional Secretary's Division had a Sinhalese majority (93.34%). Gampaha District as a whole also had a Sinhalese majority (89.84%).

Ethnicity in the Ja-Ela Divisional Secretary's Division
1. Sinhalese (93.3%)
2. Sri Lankan Tamil (4.20%)
3. Other (1.40%)
4. Burgher (1.10%)

=== Religion ===
In the 2024 census, the Ja-Ela Divisional Secretary's Division had a Roman Catholic plurality (48.97%) and a significant Buddhist population (44.09%). Gampaha District as a whole had a Buddhist majority (71.61%) and a significant Roman Catholic population (18.16%).

Religion in the Ja-Ela Divisional Secretary's Division
1. Roman Catholic (49.0%)
2. Buddhist (44.1%)
3. Other Christian (3.70%)
4. Hindu (2.20%)
5. Muslim (1.00%)
6. Other (0.00%)
