= International cricket in 1990–91 =

International cricket season

The 1990–1991 international cricket season was from September 1990 to April 1991.

== Season overview ==
International tours
Start date	Home team	Away team	Results [Matches]			
Start date	Home team	Away team	Test	ODI	FC	LA
10 October 1990	Pakistan	New Zealand	3–0 [3]	3–0 [3]	—	—
9 November 1990	Pakistan	West Indies	1–1 [3]	3–0 [3]	—	—
23 November 1990	India	Sri Lanka	1–0 [1]	2–1 [3]	—	—
23 November 1990	Australia	England	3–0 [5]	—	—	—
26 January 1991	New Zealand	Sri Lanka	0–0 [3]	3–0 [3]	—	—
9 February 1991	New Zealand	England	—	1–2 [3]	—	—
26 February 1991	West Indies	Australia	2–1 [5]	1–4 [5]	—	—
International tournaments
Start date	Tournament				Winners	
29 November 1990	(Australia) 1990-91 Benson & Hedges World Series				Australia	
20 December 1990	(United Arab Emirates) 1990–91 Sharjah Cup				Pakistan	
25 December 1990	(India) 1990–91 Asia Cup				India	

== October ==
=== New Zealand in Pakistan ===
Test series
No.	Date	Home captain	Away captain	Venue	Result
Test 1151	10–15 October	Javed Miandad	Martin Crowe	National Stadium, Karachi	Pakistan by an innings and 43 runs
Test 1152	18–23 October	Javed Miandad	Martin Crowe	Gaddafi Stadium, Lahore	Pakistan by 9 wickets
Test 1153	26–31 October	Javed Miandad	Martin Crowe	Iqbal Stadium, Faisalabad	Pakistan by 65 runs
ODI series
No.	Date	Home captain	Away captain	Venue	Result
ODI 636	2 November	Javed Miandad	Martin Crowe	Gaddafi Stadium, Lahore	Pakistan by 19 runs
ODI 637	4 November	Javed Miandad	Martin Crowe	Arbab Niaz Stadium, Peshawar	Pakistan by 8 wickets
ODI 638	6 November	Javed Miandad	Martin Crowe	Jinnah Stadium, Sialkot	Pakistan by 105 runs

== November ==
=== West Indies in Pakistan ===
ODI series
No.	Date	Home captain	Away captain	Venue	Result
ODI 639	9 November	Imran Khan	Desmond Haynes	National Stadium, Karachi	Pakistan by 6 runs
ODI 640	11 November	Imran Khan	Desmond Haynes	Gaddafi Stadium, Lahore	Pakistan by 5 wickets
ODI 641	13 November	Imran Khan	Desmond Haynes	Ibn-e-Qasim Bagh Stadium, Multan	Pakistan by 31 runs
Test series
No.	Date	Home captain	Away captain	Venue	Result
Test 1154	15–20 November	Imran Khan	Desmond Haynes	National Stadium, Karachi	Pakistan by 8 wickets
Test 1157	23–25 November	Imran Khan	Desmond Haynes	Iqbal Stadium, Faisalabad	West Indies by 7 wickets
Test 1158	6–11 December	Imran Khan	Desmond Haynes	Gaddafi Stadium, Lahore	Match drawn

=== England in Australia ===
The Ashes - Test series
No.	Date	Home captain	Away captain	Venue	Result
Test 1155	23–25 November	Allan Border	Allan Lamb	The Gabba, Brisbane	Australia by 10 wickets
Test 1159	26–30 December	Allan Border	Graham Gooch	Melbourne Cricket Ground, Melbourne	Australia by 8 wickets
Test 1160	4–8 January	Allan Border	Graham Gooch	Sydney Cricket Ground, Sydney	Match drawn
Test 1161	25–29 January	Allan Border	Graham Gooch	Adelaide Oval, Adelaide	Match drawn
Test 1163	1–5 February	Allan Border	Graham Gooch	WACA Ground, Perth	Australia by 9 wickets

=== Sri Lanka in India ===
One-off Test series
No.	Date	Home captain	Away captain	Venue	Result
Test 1156	23–27 November	Mohammad Azharuddin	Arjuna Ranatunga	Sector 16 Stadium, Chandigarh	India by an innings and 8 runs
ODI series
No.	Date	Home captain	Away captain	Venue	Result
ODI 644	1 December	Mohammad Azharuddin	Arjuna Ranatunga	Vidarbha Cricket Association Ground, Nagpur	India by 19 runs
ODI 646	5 December	Mohammad Azharuddin	Arjuna Ranatunga	Nehru Stadium, Pune	India by 6 wickets
ODI 648	8 December	Mohammad Azharuddin	Arjuna Ranatunga	Nehru Stadium, Margao	Sri Lanka by 7 wickets

=== 1990-91 Benson & Hedges World Series ===
Group stage
No.	Date	Team 1	Captain 1	Team 2	Captain 2	Venue	Result
ODI 642	29 November	Australia	Allan Border	New Zealand	Martin Crowe	Sydney Cricket Ground, Sydney	Australia by 61 runs
ODI 643	1 December	England	Allan Lamb	New Zealand	Martin Crowe	Adelaide Oval, Adelaide	New Zealand by 7 runs
ODI 645	2 December	Australia	Allan Border	New Zealand	Martin Crowe	Adelaide Oval, Adelaide	Australia by 6 wickets
ODI 647	7 December	England	Allan Lamb	New Zealand	Martin Crowe	WACA Ground, Perth	England by 4 wickets
ODI 649	9 December	Australia	Allan Border	England	Allan Lamb	WACA Ground, Perth	Australia by 6 wickets
ODI 650	11 December	Australia	Allan Border	New Zealand	Martin Crowe	Melbourne Cricket Ground, Melbourne	Australia by 6 wickets
ODI 651	13 December	England	Graham Gooch	New Zealand	Martin Crowe	Sydney Cricket Ground, Sydney	England by 33 runs
ODI 652	15 December	England	Graham Gooch	New Zealand	Martin Crowe	The Gabba, Brisbane	New Zealand by 8 wickets
ODI 653	16 December	Australia	Allan Border	England	Allan Lamb	The Gabba, Brisbane	Australia by 37 runs
ODI 654	18 December	Australia	Allan Border	New Zealand	Martin Crowe	Bellerive Oval, Hobart	Australia by 1 run
ODI 660	1 January	Australia	Allan Border	England	Allan Lamb	Sydney Cricket Ground, Sydney	Australia by 68 runs
ODI 662	10 January	Australia	Allan Border	England	Allan Lamb	Melbourne Cricket Ground, Melbourne	Australia by 3 runs
Final
No.	Date	Team 1	Captain 1	Team 2	Captain 2	Venue	Result
ODI 650	13 January	Australia	Geoff Marsh	New Zealand	Martin Crowe	Sydney Cricket Ground, Sydney	Australia by 6 wickets
ODI 664	15 January	Australia	Geoff Marsh	New Zealand	Martin Crowe	Melbourne Cricket Ground, Melbourne	Australia by 7 wickets

== December ==
=== 1990–91 Sharjah Cup ===
ODI Series
No.	Date	Team 1	Captain 1	Team 2	Captain 2	Venue	Result
ODI 655	20 December	Pakistan	Imran Khan	Sri Lanka	Arjuna Ranatunga	Sharjah Cricket Stadium, Sharjah	Sri Lanka by 6 wickets
ODI 656	21 December	Pakistan	Imran Khan	Sri Lanka	Arjuna Ranatunga	Sharjah Cricket Stadium, Sharjah	Pakistan by 50 runs

=== 1990–91 Asia Cup ===
Team	Pld	W	L	T	NR	Pts	RR
Sri Lanka	2	2	0	0	0	4	4.908
India	2	1	1	0	0	2	4.222
Bangladesh	2	0	2	0	0	0	3.663

Group stage
No.	Date	Team 1	Captain 1	Team 2	Captain 2	Venue	Result
ODI 657	25 December	India	Mohammad Azharuddin	Bangladesh	Minhajul Abedin	Sector 16 Stadium, Chandigarh	India by 9 wickets
ODI 658	28 December	India	Mohammad Azharuddin	Sri Lanka	Arjuna Ranatunga	Barabati Stadium, Cuttack	Sri Lanka by 36 runs
ODI 659	28 December	Bangladesh	Minhajul Abedin	Sri Lanka	Arjuna Ranatunga	Eden Gardens, Kolkata	Sri Lanka by 71 runs
Final
No.	Date	Team 1	Captain 1	Team 2	Captain 2	Venue	Result
ODI 661	28 December	India	Mohammad Azharuddin	Sri Lanka	Arjuna Ranatunga	Eden Gardens, Kolkata	India by 6 wickets

== January ==
=== Sri Lanka in New Zealand ===
ODI series
No.	Date	Home captain	Away captain	Venue	Result
ODI 665	26 January	Martin Crowe	Arjuna Ranatunga	McLean Park, Napier	New Zealand by 5 wickets
ODI 666	28 January	Martin Crowe	Arjuna Ranatunga	Eden Park, Auckland	New Zealand by 41 runs
ODI 667	6 February	Martin Crowe	Arjuna Ranatunga	Carisbrook, Dunedin	New Zealand by 107 runs
Test series
No.	Date	Home captain	Away captain	Venue	Result
Test 1162	31 January-4 February	Martin Crowe	Arjuna Ranatunga	Basin Reserve, Wellington	Match drawn
Test 1164	22–26 February	Martin Crowe	Arjuna Ranatunga	Seddon Park, Hamilton	Match drawn
Test 1165	1–5 March	Ian Smith	Arjuna Ranatunga	Eden Park, Auckland	Match drawn

== February ==
=== England in New Zealand ===
ODI series
No.	Date	Home captain	Away captain	Venue	Result
ODI 668	9 February	Martin Crowe	Graham Gooch	AMI Stadium, Christchurch	England by 14 runs
ODI 669	13 February	Martin Crowe	Graham Gooch	Basin Reserve, Wellington	New Zealand by 9 runs
ODI 670	16 February	Martin Crowe	Graham Gooch	Eden Park, Auckland	New Zealand by 7 runs

=== Australia in the West Indies ===
ODI series
No.	Date	Home captain	Away captain	Venue	Result
ODI 671	26 February	Vivian Richards	Allan Border	Sabina Park, Kingston	Australia by 35 runs
ODI 672	9 March	Vivian Richards	Allan Border	Queen's Park Oval, Port of Spain	Australia by 45 runs
ODI 673	10 March	Vivian Richards	Allan Border	Queen's Park Oval, Port of Spain	West Indies by 7 wickets
ODI 674	13 March	Vivian Richards	Allan Border	Kensington Oval, Bridgetown	Australia by 37 runs
ODI 675	20 March	Vivian Richards	Allan Border	Bourda, Georgetown	Australia by 66 wickets
Frank Worrell Trophy - Test series
No.	Date	Home captain	Away captain	Venue	Result
Test 1166	1–6 March	Vivian Richards	Allan Border	Sabina Park, Kingston	Match drawn
Test 1167	23–28 March	Vivian Richards	Allan Border	Bourda, Georgetown	West Indies by 10 wickets
Test 1168	5–10 April	Vivian Richards	Allan Border	Queen's Park Oval, Port of Spain	Match drawn
Test 1169	19–24 April	Vivian Richards	Allan Border	Kensington Oval, Bridgetown	West Indies by 343 runs
Test 1170	27 April-1 May	Vivian Richards	Allan Border	Antigua Recreation Ground, St John's	Australia by 157 runs
