= A. C. de Zoysa =

Sri Lankan criminal lawyer

Ainsley Clive "Bunty" de Zoysa, PC (1923 - 22 September 1983) was a Sri Lankan criminal lawyer.

== Early life and education ==
Born to Sir Francis de Zoysa, KC an Advocate and member of the first State Council and Lady Ethel Perera Amarasekera Siriwardena, his brothers were DIG Sydney de Zoysa, Stanley de Zoysa and Lucien de Zoysa. Richard de Zoysa was his nephew. He was educated at the Royal College, Colombo and at the Ceylon Law College, taking oaths as an Advocate in 1949.

== Legal career ==
Having practiced under Dr Colvin R de Silva, Bunty de Zoysa joined the Attorney General’s Department as a Crown Counsel in 1951, on the invitation of Sir Alan Rose, the Attorney General. He developed a reputation as a criminal prosecutor. Dissatisfied with the lack of proportions, Bunty de Zoysa along with H. L. de Silva resigned from the Attorney General’s Department and joined the Unofficial bar, where he quickly developed a successful practice as a criminal lawyer in both the original and in the appellate courts. He was appointed a President's Counsel, elected President of the Bar Association and served as a Board Director of the Bank of Ceylon from 1977 to 1983. He led the Special Presidential Commission of Inquiry into misuse of power by Sirima Bandaranaike and Felix Dias Bandaranaike, during the Bandaranaike government between 1970 and 1977.
