= Gamperaliya =

Gamperaliya may refer to:

- Gamperaliya (novel), a novel by Martin Wickremasinghe
- Gamperaliya (film), a 1963 Sri Lankan drama film
