= D. P. Jayasuriya =

Ceylonese politician

Hon. Gate Mudaliyar Arachchige Don Pantalion Jayasuriya MP

Member of the Ceylon Parliament for Ja-Ela
- In office 1947–1956
- Preceded by: seat created
- Succeeded by: Stanley de Zoysa

State Council of Ceylon
- In office 1931–1946

Personal details
- Born: 27 July 1882 Ceylon
- Party: United National Party
- Profession: politician

Gate Mudaliyar Arachchige Don Pantalion Jayasuriya (born 27 July 1882) was a Ceylonese politician.

Jayasuriya was elected as a member of the 1st State Council of Ceylon on 7 July 1931, representing the Gampaha electorate. He was subsequently re-elected on the 2nd State Council of Ceylon in 1936. In 1947 the 1947 Soulbury Constitution replaced the State Council with the Parliament of Ceylon, as part of a process of constitutional development leading up to the country's independence.

At the 1st parliamentary election, held between 23 August 1947 and 20 September 1947, Jayasuriya successfully ran as the United National Party candidate in the Ja-Ela electorate, securing the seat with just over 50% of the total vote.

Jayasuriya retained the seat at the 2nd parliamentary election, held between 24 May 1952 and 30 May 1952, polling 18,212 votes defeating the Lanka Sama Samaja Party candidate, Lassin Wewala Panditha, who received 6,308 votes and the Sri Lanka Freedom Party candidate, S. Stone Anthony, who polled just 5,790 votes.
