= Madol Duwa =

Madol Duwa මඩොල් දූව
- Directed by: Lester James Peries
- Written by: Phillip Cooray
- Based on: novel by Martin Wickremasinghe
- Produced by: Upasena Marasinghe
- Starring: Ajith Jinadasa; Padmasena Athukorala; Joe Abeywickrema
- Cinematography: M. S. Ananda
- Edited by: Sumitra Peries; Gladwin Fernando
- Music by: W. D. Amaradeva
- Release date: 2 April 1976
- Running time: 92 minutes
- Country: Sri Lanka
- Language: Sinhala

Madol Duwa (Sinhala, Mangrove Island) is a 1976 Sri Lankan drama film directed by Lester James Peries and produced by Upasena Marasinghe. The film stars Ajith Jinadasa as Upali, a young rebellious youth who travels to a small island to get away from the restrictive society around him.

The film is based on Martin Wickremasinghe's 1947 novel Madol Doova. It was a commercial success.

== Plot ==
Young Upali Giniwella (Nandana Hettiarachi who grows up into Ajith Jinadasa) is resentful of his new stepmother (Somalatha Subasinghe) and lashes out by committing harmless acts of mischief around the village. For this Upali is sent to a boarding school where he bonds with the headmaster (Joe Abeywickrema). He once again gets into trouble however and is returned home when a new headmaster installed.

Upali is punished by his father back home. He becomes more resentful and takes off with his servant boy Jinna (Padmasena Athukorala) to the island dubbed Madol Duwa. After some adventures there, Upali is found by a friend of his father. Upali learns that his father is sick and returns home to ask for forgiveness.

== Cast ==
- Ajith Jinadasa as Upali Giniwelle
- Padmasena Athukorala as Jinadasa 'Jinna'
- David Dharmakeerthi as Mudalali 'Thaththa'
- Somalatha Subasinghe as Upali's stepmother
- S. A. Jamis as Podi Gamarala
- Joe Abeywickrama as Dharmasinghe 'Gurunnanse'
- Daya Alwis as Punchi Mahaththaya
- Trilicia Gunawardena as Dharmasinghe 'Hamine'
- Mapa Gunaratne as Lawyer Rajapakse
- Damayanthi Fonseka as Lawyer's daughter
- Nandana Hettiarachchi as Young Upali
- Sunil Premakumara as Dangadasa
- Upali Attanayake as Suranchiya
- Dhamma Jagoda as Balappu
- Pujitha Mendis as Upasaka Appu
- Denawaka Hamine as Net trapped homeowner
- Shanthi Lekha as Annie Perera
- Somaratne Dissanayake as Raja Niladariya
- Senaka Perera as Suranchiya's friend
- Harry Wimalasena as Stage fleeing actor
- Rinsley Weeraratne as Fisherman
- Miyuri Samarasinghe as Upali's mother

=== Soundtrack ===
The song Koheda Koheda Ape Lowak sung by Victor Rathnayake is included in this film.

== See also ==
- Madol Doova
- Martin Wickramasinghe
