= Martin Wickramasinghe Folk Museum =

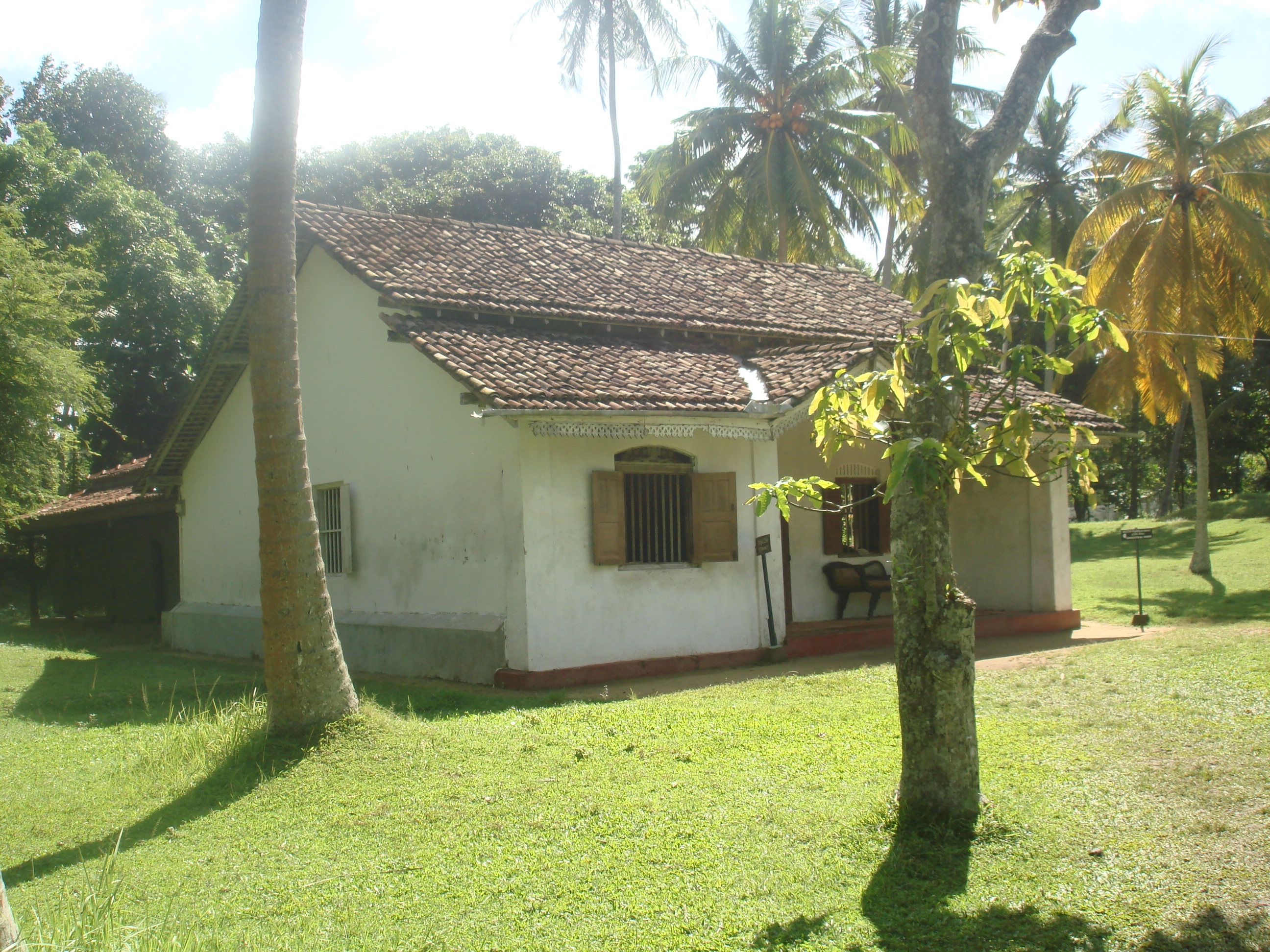
- Wickramasinghe House in Koggala.
- Established: 1981; 45 years ago
- Location: Koggala, Southern Province, Sri Lanka
- Coordinates: 5°59′24.54″N 80°19′40.99″E
- Type: Biographical museum
- Founder: Martin Wickramasinghe Trust
- Website: martinwickramasinghe.info

Martin Wickramasinghe Folk Museum is located in Koggala, Southern Province, Sri Lanka. Named after the writer Martin Wickramasinghe, who had been considered as the father of modern Sinhala literature. The museum complex consists of Wickramasinghe's childhood home and a folk museum. It is also the location of the final resting place of Wickramasinghe, his wife and other family members.

== Wickramasinghe House ==
Wickramasinghe was born in Koggala at his ancestral home and spent his childhood there, before settling in Colombo in his adult life working as a journalist. The house along with much of the village of Koggala was taken over during the establishment of RAF Koggala in 1941. It was returned to Wickramasinghe in 1962 by the government of Sirima Bandaranaike. It was Wickramasinghe's hope that a folk museum and a library would be established there.

== Folk museum ==
Following his death in 1976, the Martin Wickramasinghe Trust established that year to curate his personal papers, effects and books. The Trust began a collection of folk art and artifacts. The folk museum was established in 1981, with his house in Koggala converted into a museum dedicated to his life and work, and new buildings built to house the Trust's growing collection of artifacts from local folk life.

== Samadiya ==
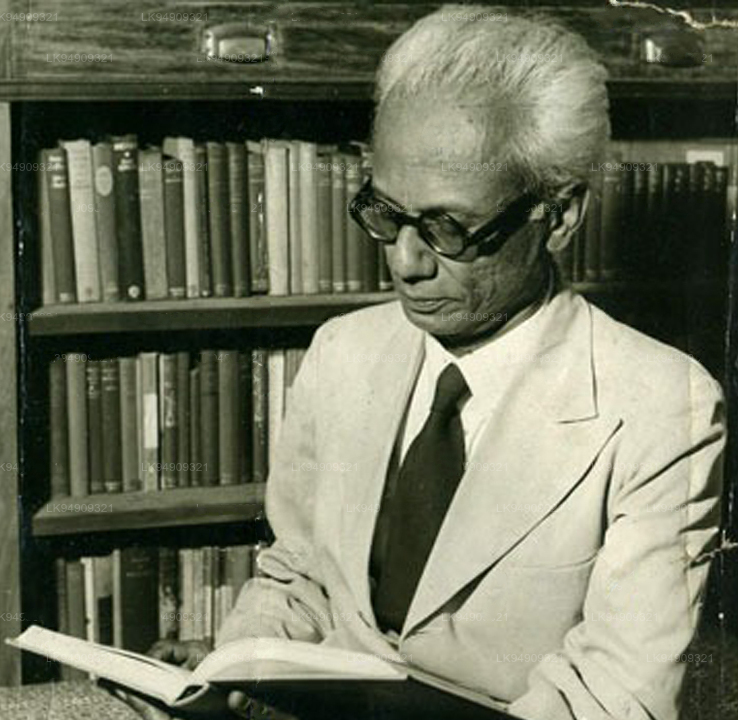
Martin Wickramasinghe

Located on the grounds is the Martin Wickramasinghe Samadiya where the ashes of Wickramasinghe and his wife Prema Wickramasinghe are buried. It is a grass covered mound to the right of the house, surmounted by a rock from the Koggala reef, where he had spent many hours of his childhood.

== See also ==
- Horagolla Bandaranaike Samadhi
