= Michael de Zoysa =

Sri Lankan cricketer and administrator (1946–2019)

- Born: 30 September 1946; Colombo, British Ceylon
- Died: 29 September 2019 (aged 72); Colombo, Sri Lanka
- Employer: Sri Lanka Cricket
- Known for: Former secretary of Sri Lanka Cricket
- Relatives: Sir Francis de Zoysa (grandfather); Lucien de Zoysa (father); Richard de Zoysa (brother)

Michael de Zoysa (Sinhala: මෛකල් ඩි සොය්සා) (30 September 1946 – 29 September 2019) was a Sri Lankan cricketer, who served as the administrator of Sri Lanka Cricket and a veteran in the Ceylon Tea industry. He also served as secretary of the Singhalese Sports Club and worked as a chief manager of the Sri Lanka national cricket team.

De Zoysa became the manager of the Sri Lankan cricket team in 2013 succeeding Charith Senanayake and served for a two-year term until 2015. During his tenure, Sri Lanka notably won the 2014 ICC World Twenty20 before his assignment as team manager being ended on 10 April 2015.

He died on 29 September 2019 due to an illness a day before his 73rd birthday. Prior to his death, he served as the head of the advisory committee of Sri Lanka Cricket. The Sri Lankan cricket team players wore black armbands as a tribute to him during the second ODI of the Sri Lanka v Pakistan ODI series which was held on 30 September 2019.
