= Dhamma Jagoda =

Sri Lanakan actor (1941–1988)

Dhamma Jagoda ධම්ම ජාගොඩ
- Born: January 28, 1941; Hikkaduwa, Sri Lanka
- Died: February 4, 1988 (aged 47); Sri Jayawardenepura Hospital, Colombo
- Other names: Dharmapala Kalahe Jagoda
- Education: Mahinda College Galle; Nalanda College, Colombo
- Occupations: Film, Television and Stage director, Actor, Teacher
- Spouse(s): Sunethra Sarachchandra, Manel Jagoda
- Children: 4

Dhamma Jagoda (28 January 1941 – 4 February 1988) was the first Head of the Drama Unit at the National Television channel Rupavahini Corporation in Sri Lanka. He was a pioneer theater and television play director and actor in Sri Lanka. He inaugurated the first theatre school (the Lionel Wendt Kala Kendra Ranga Shilpa Shalika) at Lionel Wendt Art Centre, Colombo 7, in the 1970s and it was the foundation for many artists who have emerged in Sri Lanka in recent years. Dhamma Jagoda was educated at Mahinda College, Galle and Nalanda College, Colombo.

== Directed Play ==
- 1963 Vesmuhunu
- 1970 'Kora Saha Andaya'(The Lame and the Blind) script Dharmasena Pathiraja Produced by Dhamma Jagoda
- 1971 Malavun Nagiti
- Moscow GiniGani
- Sakala Jana
- Hotabariyudde
- Kuriru Ranga( Play of cruelty)
- Parasthawa and Porisadaya

== Directed Television Play ==
- Palingu Menike
- Mihikathage Daruvo
- Dimuthu muthu

Madol duvwas

== Performed Play ==
- 1963 Kuveni
- 1968 E. M. Forster’s A Passage To India:
- 1976 Nattukkari
- Punchi Palingurena
- Maname
- Kelani Palama
- Muhudu Puttu
- Kontara

== Performed Film ==
- Mahagedara as Premasiri
- Madol Duwa as Balappu
- Mummulawela
- Green Emerald

== Awards ==
- 1963 Best Actor- role of 'Kawlavsky' for "Ves Muhunu"
