= Bertie Wijesinha =

Sri Lankan cricketer (1920–2017)

Personal information
- Full name: Reginald Bertram Wijesinha
- Born: 24 May 1920; Kalutara, Ceylon
- Died: 8 April 2017 (aged 96); Colombo, Sri Lanka
- Batting: Right-handed
- Bowling: Right-arm medium-pace
- Role: All-rounder

Career statistics
Competition	First-class
Matches	17
Runs scored	476
Batting average	21.63
100s/50s	0/1
Top score	57
Balls bowled	2653
Wickets	34
Bowling average	36.52
5 wickets in innings	2
10 wickets in match	0
Best bowling	5/59
Catches/stumpings	6/–
- Source: CricketArchive, 14 September 2017

Bertrum Wijesinha, also spelled Wijesinghe (24 May 1920 – 8 April 2017) was a cricketer who played 17 matches of first-class cricket for Ceylon between 1947 and 1956.

== Life and working career ==
Bertie Wijesinha was educated at S. Thomas' College, Mount Lavinia, where he was a prominent cricketer. After leaving school, he taught English at S. Thomas' College and coached the cricket team. In 1949 he married Dorothy Weerekoon; they celebrated their 68th wedding anniversary just before he died.

Also in 1949 he joined the Lake House newspaper group where he ended up as the sports editor of the Sunday Observer. He served as sports editor of the Sunday Observer from 1953 to 1972, and coached the cricket team at Trinity College, Kandy, from 1971 to 1976. He then moved to the United Kingdom, where he worked for 10 years as a clerk for the Navy, Army and Air Force Institutes.

Wijesinha provided radio commentaries for cricket matches in Sri Lanka for many years, including international matches and the annual Royal–Thomian inter-school match. He formed a long-lasting on-air partnership with his former Ceylon team-mate Lucien de Zoysa.

== Cricket career ==
In Ceylon's innings loss to Pakistan in Colombo in April 1949, Wijesinha was Ceylon's highest scorer with 29 and 12, and took 5 for 105, dismissing Pakistan's first five batsmen. On Ceylon's tour of Pakistan the next season he was Ceylon's top-scorer in the first first-class match, an innings loss to Karachi and Sind, scoring 13 not out and 57. Later in the tour he took his best bowling figures, 5 for 59, in the drawn match against Pakistan Universities.

Wijesinha played all his club cricket for Sinhalese Sports Club. He coached several players who went on to represent Sri Lanka, including Anura Tennekoon and the brothers Sunil, Mithra and Sidath Wettimuny. The father of the Wettimuny brothers built Sri Lanka's first indoor cricket nets, then handed them over to Wijesinha on the condition that he coach his sons.

Wijesinha published a book, Love of a Lifetime, in 2004, combining his cricket memoirs and Sri Lankan cricket history.
