= Charith Senanayake =

Sri Lankan cricketer

Personal information
- Full name: Charith Panduka Senanayake
- Born: 19 December 1962 (age 63); Colombo, Sri Lanka
- Batting: Left-handed
- Bowling: Right-arm medium

International information
- National side: Sri Lanka
- Test debut (cap 47): 31 January 1991 v New Zealand
- Last Test: 1 March 1991 v New Zealand
- ODI debut (cap 63): 21 December 1990 v Pakistan
- Last ODI: 6 February 1991 v New Zealand

Domestic team information
- Years: Team
- 1982/83–1993/94: Colombo Cricket Club
- 1998: Mombasa Sports Club

Career statistics
| Competition | Test | ODI | FC | LA |
|---|---|---|---|---|
| Matches | 3 | 7 | 19 | 11 |
| Runs scored | 97 | 126 | 747 | 222 |
| Batting average | 19.39 | 18.00 | 25.75 | 20.18 |
| 100s/50s | 0/1 | 0/0 | 0/4 | 0/0 |
| Top score | 64 | 27 | 92 | 49 |
| Catches/stumpings | 2/– | 2/– | 8/0 | 3/0 |
- Source: Cricinfo, 3 July 2021

Charith Panduka Senanayake (born 19 December 1962) is a former Sri Lankan cricketer and businessman. He played in three Test matches and seven One Day Internationals from 1990 to 1991. He also served as manager of Sri Lanka national cricket team for a considerable period of time. He also played professional cricket in Kenya representing Mombasa Sports Club. He has also worked as an expert in marketing in several positions including marketing manager of Macwoods Ltd in Sri Lanka, marketing consultant of Tea Tang Ltd in Sri Lanka, general manager of LAB International Ltd in Kenya and CEO of Afri Bridge Trade Exporters in Kenya.

== Career ==
He pursued his primary and secondary education at the Ananda College where he also played school cricket and also featured in popular school Big Match Ananda–Nalanda (involving arch-rivals Ananda College and Nalanda College).

He played in domestic cricket competitions representing Colombo Cricket Club and his first-class playing career spanned for about a decade between 1982 and 1983 season to the 1993–94 season. Charith made his ODI debut on 21 December 1990 against Pakistan at the 1990–91 Sharjah Cup.

He received his maiden test call up for the tour of New Zealand in 1990 and subsequently made his test debut on 31 January 1991 against New Zealand at Wellington where he scored duck on debut while opening the batting. He then went onto score his maiden test half-century in his second test during the second test match of the series against New Zealand. He scored 64 opening the batting alongside debutant Chandika Hathurusingha and the duo added 95 runs for the opening wicket. He was then dropped from the Sri Lankan test team after the third test of the series as he only scored 97 runs during the three match test cricket in the tour of New Zealand and it also marked his only test series of his career. Roshan Mahanama and Chandika Hathurusingha subsequently secured their positions as openers in test team which left no room for Charith to regain his place in the side.

He then moved to Kenya in 1998 due to lack of opportunities in Sri Lanka in order to pursue his cricketing career. In December 1998, he won the Best All-Round Award in Kenya's Coastal Province and was also recognized for his captaincy steering Mombasa Sports Club to win their maiden CCA Postel Knockout Trophy. He has also worked as coach of Colombo Cricket Club on two occasions just prior to his migration to Kenya. He also worked as a television commentator for a brief period.

After his retirement from professional cricket, he became the head of Sri Lanka Cricket's marketing unit and served in the post from 2008 to 2011. He was also appointed as the team manager of Sri Lanka men's cricket team in 2008 replacing Hashan Tillakaratne following the intervention of the then Sports minister Gamini Lokuge. It was revealed that he had lived in Kenya for about ten years primarily involved in tea plantation and worked for a British tea company based in Kenya. He was appointed as team manager when he was on the holiday to Sri Lanka.

In February 2012, he was again appointed as team manager replacing Anura Tennekoon. He then resigned from the position of team manager in 2013 and was subsequently replaced by Michael de Zoysa.

However, he was once again reinstated as the team manager of Sri Lankan team in April 2016 following the end two-year tenure of Michael de Zoysa. In December 2016, he was replaced by Ranjit Fernando as the manager of Sri Lankan team on a rotational basis for the tours of South Africa and Australia. He again became the team manager in July 2018 for the fourth time replacing Asanka Gurusinha.

In November 2018, he again resigned as the team manager in wake of Sri Lanka's humiliating defeat against England at Galle in first of the three match test series and was subsequently replaced by Jeryl Woutersz. In 2020, he was roped in by Burgher Recreation Club as director of coaching.

In June 2021, he was appointed as the chairman of the LPL Technical Committee for the 2021 Lanka Premier League.

== Controversies ==
In February 2013, he was unceremoniously sacked from the position of team manager of Sri Lankan national team just a month before the expiration of his contract with SLC. He was accused then for his allegedly leaking a personal letter from the then national team captain Mahela Jayawardene to the media in which Mahela claimed that he had lost all his confidence in SLC. Senanayake along with Jayawardene were accused of breaching the contract with SLC and their actions were reviewed by SLC.

In November 2018, he was made scapegoat for Sri Lanka's decline in international cricket which was primarily due to the internal affairs within the Sri Lanka Cricket Board and he subsequently resigned due to poor performances of the national cricket team. He had revealed that Sri Lankan cricket would be placed in a situation like the Kenyan cricket team in the future.

In 2016, he was accused of involving in a brawl with veteran Sri Lankan spinner Muttiah Muralitharan over the appointment of Muralitharan as the spin bowling consultant for Australia national cricket team by Cricket Australia prior to the start of the three match test series between Sri Lanka and Australia. Charith alleged Muralitharan for possibly influencing the pitch curator to prepare a turning pitch to suit Australian spinners Nathan Lyon and Steve O'Keefe at the P. Sara Oval during one of Australia's practice matches.
