= Ape Gama =

1940 book by Martin Wickramasinghe

- Author: Martin Wickramasinghe
- Translators: Lakshmi de Silva
- Language: Sinhala
- Genre: Fiction
- Published: 1940
- Publication place: Sri Lanka
- Media type: Book
- ISBN: 9789558415443

Apē Gama (Sinhala:අපේ ගම, Tamil:எங்கள் கிராமம்) (lit. Our Village) is a semi-autobiographical book by Sri Lankan author Martin Wickramasinghe detailing the narrator's experiences as a child in Southern Province, Sri Lanka. Initially published in 1940, it was translated into English in 1968 as Lay Bare the Roots. It is seventeen chapters long.

== Plot ==
A young boy growing up in a village in Ceylon and how he deals with rapid economic and social changes that are going on around him.

== Reception ==
Charles Hallisey in Literary Cultures in History: Reconstructions from South Asia states that the narrator is "a villager, unself-consciously secure in his local experiences of the world to such a degree that by nature he was 'literary'." "...this villager becomes a tutor to urbanized authors and readers, who must unlearn what they have been taught in school in order to regain the cultural authenticity that survives in the village."

The work was well received by the English educated people of Sri Lanka.
