= Richard de Zoysa =

Sri Lankan journalist, author, human rights activist and actor

Richard de Zoysa රිචඩ් ද සොයිසා
- Born: 18 March 1958; Colombo, Sri Lanka
- Died: 18 February 1990 (aged 31); Sri Lanka
- Education: S. Thomas' College, Mount Lavinia
- Known for: Role of Malin Kabalana in Yuganthaya (1983)
- Parents: Lucien de Zoysa (father); Manorani Saravanamuttu (mother)
- Relatives: Manicasothy Saravanamuttu (grandfather)

Richard Manik de Zoysa (Sinhala: රිචඩ් ද සොයිසා; Tamil: இரிச்சர்ட் டி சோய்சா; 18 March 1958 – 18 February 1990) was a well-known Sri Lankan journalist, author, human rights activist and actor who was abducted and murdered on 18 February 1990. His murder caused widespread outrage inside the country and is widely believed to have been carried out by a death squad linked to elements within the government.

== Life and death ==
=== Background ===
De Zoysa was born in Colombo, Sri Lanka. He was of mixed ethnicity, his father Lucien de Zoysa a majority Sinhalese and his mother Manorani Saravanamuttu, a family physician from the minority Sri Lankan Tamil community. His mother's father, Manicasothy Saravanamuttu, was a prominent journalist and diplomat in Malaya. His brother, Michael de Zoysa, was a Sri Lankan cricketer.

He was educated at S. Thomas' College, Mount Lavinia, where his acting talents in Sinhala were encouraged by D.S. Jayasekera. He was judged Best Actor in the English medium at the national inter-school Shakespeare Drama Competition in 1972. He was a member of the Debating Team and Drama Society along with Chanaka Amaratunga.

A notable role in Yuganthaya

=== Abduction ===
At the time of his abduction and murder, de Zoysa was the head of the Colombo office of the Inter Press Service. He lived in the Welikadawatte housing estate with his mother Manorani Saravanamuttu and associate A. V. Karunaratne.

In the early morning of 18 February 1990, an armed group broke into their home and forcibly drove off with de Zoysa without explanation. Saravanamuttu hastily travelled to the Welikada police station and lodged a complaint. The following day, de Zoysa's lifeless body was dumped on the beach at Moratuwa, some 12 miles south of Colombo. He had been shot in the head and the throat and his jaw had been broken. His body was identified by his friend and fellow journalist Taraki Sivaram, who suffered a similar fate in 2005.

=== Government response ===
At the inquest the following day, Saravanamuttu stated that she could identify two of the abductors. Three months later, she saw one of the abductors on television: a high-ranking police officer. She informed her lawyer, who brought it to the notice of both the Magistrate conducting the inquiry into the incident and the police. However, the suspect was not arrested and the lead was ignored. Both Saravanamuttu and her lawyer, Batty Weerakoon, subsequently received death threats. Police officers assigned to guard Batty Weerakoon has also received similar threats. Saravanamuttu later became an activist for missing people and died in 2001.

In 2005, Assistant Superintendent of Police Lal Priyantha Darmasiri Ranchagoda, Officer in Charge Bodeniya Gamlath Gedara Devasurendra and Sergeant Mahawedikkarage Sarathchandra were indicted for de Zoysa's murder. They were acquitted of all charges on 9 November 2005 by Colombo High Court Judge Rohini Perera; she stated that the evidence presented by the prosecution was "contradictory and not credible".

== Aftermath ==
de Zoysa's murder is widely believed to have been carried out by a death squad formed under the auspices of members of the government to crush the insurrection launched by the militant Janatha Vimukthi Peramuna (JVP) organization. Since 1987, when the insurrection was launched, these death squads are alleged to have killed thousands of alleged JVP members in an ultimately successful attempt to quell the rebellion. They are also alleged to have killed political opponents, including de Zoysa, who was linked to the JVP.

Rajiva Wijesinha, a political analyst and Secretary-General of the Secretariat for Coordinating the Peace Process, has repeatedly said that de Zoysa's murder was the turning point for the death squads. He claims that with the JVP insurrection largely over and the usefulness of the death squads coming to an end, President Ranasinghe Premadasa used de Zoysa's murder and the subsequent outcry against it as a reason to call a halt to the killings carried out by the death squads, which were formed during his predecessors' era.

== Legacy ==
An award in recognition of independent journalism was established by the UN-sponsored Inter Press Service news agency in de Zoysa's memory.

Rajiva Wijesinha wrote a novel based on the life and death of Richard de Zoysa titled Limits of Love. Published after the death of Richard's mother in 2005, it has some controversial revelations including explicit references to the homosexuality of the main character.

The main character of Shehan Karunatilaka's novel The Seven Moons of Maali Almeida, winner of the 2022 Booker Prize, was also inspired by Richard de Zoysa. One of the characters' names, Malinda Albert Kabalana, is a reference to de Zoysa's role Malin Kabalana in Yuganthaya, and is described as a closeted gay man who sets out to solve the mystery of his own death and is given one week ("seven moons") during which he can travel between the afterlife and the real world. In this time, he hopes to retrieve a set of photographs, stored under a bed, and to persuade his friends to share them widely to expose the brutalities of the Sri Lankan Civil War.

In the 2025 film Rani, actor Rehan Amarathunga played the role of Richard de Zoysa.

== Filmography ==
In 1983, de Zoysa starred in Lester James Peries's film Yuganthaya alongside Gamini Fonseka. The role of socialist Malin Kabalana in the movie closely mirrored de Zoysa's own beliefs. His last role was that of Wimal in Tissa Abeysekara's film Viragaya.

Year	Film	Role	Ref.
1985	Yuganthaya	Malin Kabalana	
1987	Sathyagrahanaya	Nimal Weerawantha	

== See also ==
- State terrorism in Sri Lanka
- 1987–89 JVP Insurrection
