= Joseph Michael Perera =

Sri Lankan politician (1941–2023)

The Honourable Joseph Michael Perera
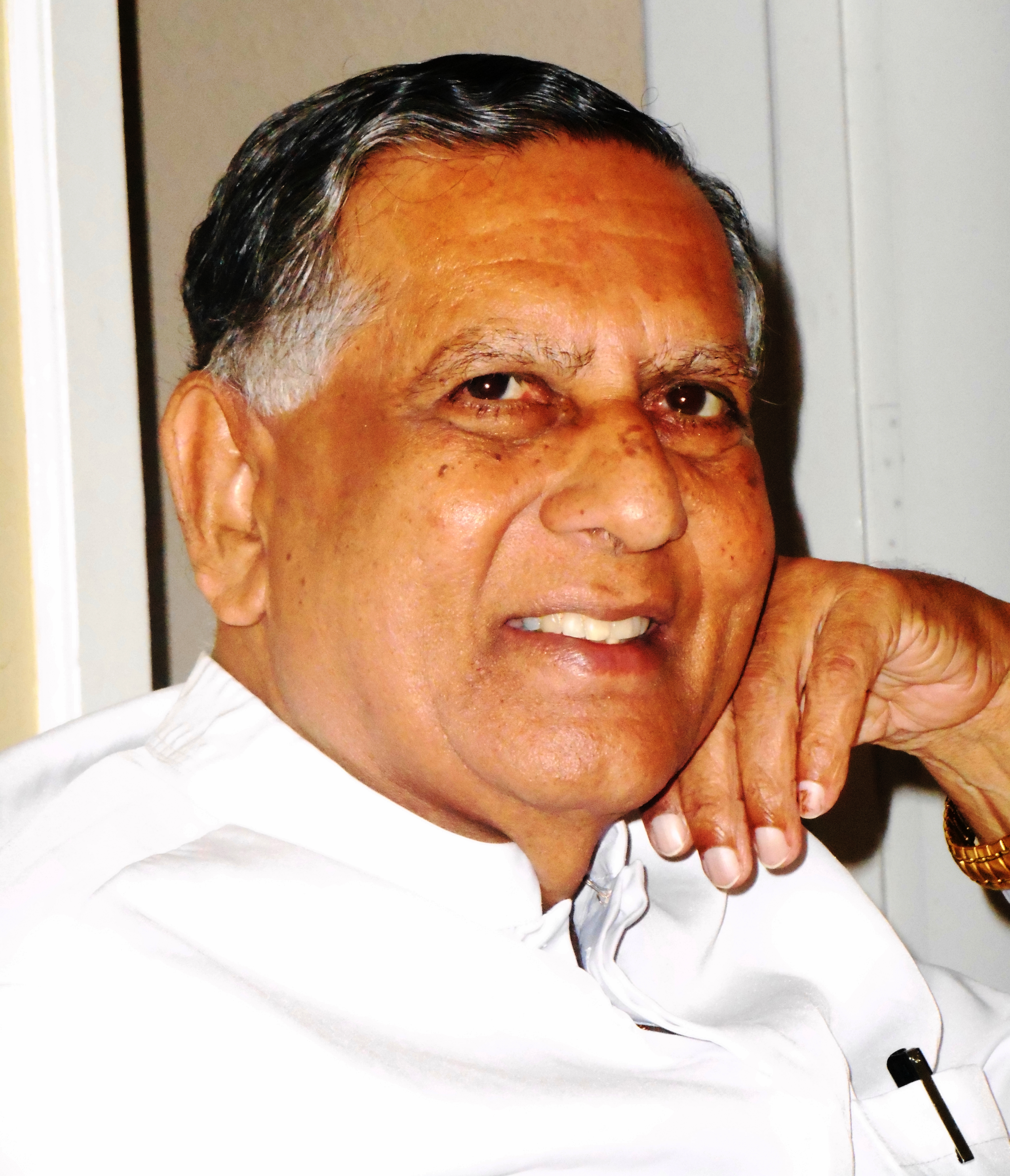

17th Speaker of the Parliament
- In office 19 December 2001 – 7 February 2004
- President: Chandrika Kumaratunga
- Prime Minister: Ranil Wickremesinghe
- Preceded by: Anura Bandaranaike
- Succeeded by: W. J. M. Lokubandara

Minister of Home Affairs
- In office 12 January 2015 – 17 August 2015
- President: Maithripala Sirisena
- Prime Minister: Ranil Wickremesinghe
- Preceded by: John Seneviratne
- Succeeded by: Vajira Abeywardena

Chief Opposition Whip
- In office 26 January 2006 – 20 April 2010
- Preceded by: Mahinda Samarasinghe
- Succeeded by: John Amaratunga

Member of the Ceylon Parliament for Ja-Ela District
- In office 1976–1989
- Preceded by: G. J. Paris Perera
- Succeeded by: Seat abolished

Member of Parliament for Gampaha District
- In office 1989–2010
- Preceded by: Seat created

Member of Parliament for National List
- In office 2010–2023

Personal details
- Born: 15 September 1941
- Died: 28 March 2023 (aged 81) Ja-Ela, Sri Lanka
- Party: UNP
- Other political affiliations: United National Front

M. Joseph Michael Perera (15 September 1941 – 28 March 2023) was a Sri Lankan politician who served as a member of the Parliament of Sri Lanka, and its 17th speaker.

Perera died in Ja-Ela on 28 March 2023, at the age of 81.

== Sources ==
- "M. JOSEPH MICHAEL PERERA". Directory of Members. Parliament of Sri Lanka. Archived from the original on 9 October 2010.
