= G. J. Paris Perera =

Ceylonese politician (1922–1976)

Hon. G. J. Paris Perera

Member of the Ceylonese Parliament for Ja-Ela
- In office 1960–1976
- Preceded by: Stanley de Zoysa
- Succeeded by: Joseph Michael Perera

Personal details
- Born: Gamamedaliyanage John Paris Perera; 14 March 1922
- Died: March 1976 (aged 53–54) Colombo, Sri Lanka
- Party: United National Party

Gamamedaliyanage John Paris Perera (14 March 1922 – 1976) was a Ceylonese politician. He was the Deputy Chairman of Committees and Member of Parliament from 1960 to 1977.

Perera first contested for parliament at the 1956 general election in the Ja-Ela electorate, representing the United National Party (UNP). At the election he polled 19,132 votes (43% of the total vote) but was unsuccessful losing to the Sri Lanka Freedom Party (SLFP) candidate Stanley de Zoysa by 5,249 votes. He re-contested the seat of Ja-Ela at the 4th parliamentary election, held on 19 March 1960, where he defeated the sitting member, de Zoysa, by 3,195 (polling 44% of the total vote). The election results however left neither of Ceylon's two major parties with a majority, with the result being the calling of another election. Perera was subsequently re-elected at the 5th parliamentary election held on 20 July 1960. This time receiving 13,622 votes (50% of the total vote), 2,724 votes ahead of the SLFP candidate, D. Oliver Jayasuriya, and 11,314 votes ahead of de Zoysa.

Perera was also re-elected at the 6th parliamentary election, held on 22 March 1965, receiving 21,867 votes (61% of the total vote), and at the 1970 general election, polling 21,657 votes (50% of the total vote). He served as the Deputy Chairman of Committees from 9 March 1968 to 25 March 1970.

In 1976 Perera died whilst still in office. A by-election for Ja-Ela electorate was held on 23 April that year, and the seat was filled by Joseph Michael Perera from the UNP.
