= S. K. Wickremasinghe =

Sri Lankan business executive and diplomat (1926–2020)

Sarath Kusum Wickramasinghe (known as S. K. Wickremasinghe) (1926 - 11 June 2020) was a Sri Lankan business executive and diplomat. He served as Sri Lankan High Commissioner to the United Kingdom from 1995 to 1999.

== Early life and education ==
The eldest son of Martin Wickramasinghe, a leading Sri Lankan novelist and Kataluwe Balage Prema de Silva, he was educated at S. Thomas' College, Mount Lavinia and graduated from the University of Ceylon with a BSc degree.

== Career ==
He joined the Colombo office of Imperial Chemical Industries in 1951 as a commercial executive. In 1964, with import restrictions implemented by Sirima Bandaranaike's government, ICI formed Chemical Industries (Colombo) Limited (CIC) to retain its import licenses allowed by Internal Trade Minister T. B. Ilangaratne. In 1966, Wickramasinghe became the chairman and CEO of CIC, serving till 1980. In 1980 he retired as CEO but continued as Chairman till 1995. He later served as Chairman of Commercial Bank of Ceylon (1989–1994), Ceylon Tobacco Company, CTC Eagle, NDB, SriLankan Airlines and Chemanex which was founded by Wickremasinghe. He was appointed Sri Lankan High Commissioner to the United Kingdom in February 1995 and served till January 1999. He was a Trustee of the Employers’ Federation of Ceylon and served in the boards of Securities and Exchange Commission (1991–1995), National Education Commission, the Sri Lanka Institute of Development Administration and the Postgraduate Institute of Management of the University of Sri Jayewardenepura.

== Personal life ==
He married Damayantha Hulugalle, daughter of the writer H.A.J. Hulugalle, they lived at Classen Place, Colombo. He served as Chairman of the Martin Wickramasinghe Trust.
