= 1990–91 Sharjah Cup =

International cricket tournament

1990 Sharjah Cup
- Cricket format: One Day International
- Host: United Arab Emirates
- Champions: Pakistan
- Runners-up: Sri Lanka
- Participants: 2
- Matches: 2
- Player of the series: (Pakistan) Ijaz Ahmed (Batsman of the Tournament) (Sri Lanka) RJ Ratnayake (Bowler of the Tournament)
- Most runs: (Pakistan) Ijaz Ahmed (92)
- Most wickets: (Sri Lanka) RJ Ratnayake (5)

The 1990 Sharjah Cup was a cricket tournament held in Sharjah, UAE, between December 20–21, 1990.

Two national teams took part: Pakistan and Sri Lanka. Two other sides – India and West Indies – had been scheduled to take part, but withdrew due to the Gulf crisis.

Pakistan won the tournament on superior run-rate after each side won one match each. Pakistan won US$20,000 while Sri Lanka won US$10,000.

The tournament was sponsored by Instaphone.

== Matches ==
20 December 1990
Scorecard
Wisden report

Pakistan; 170 (43 overs)	v	Sri Lanka; 172/4 (39.5 overs)
Imran Khan 43 (54); RJ Ratnayake 5/32 (9 overs)		A Ranatunga 45* (86); Wasim Akram 2/40 (9 overs)

Sri Lanka won by 6 wickets
Sharjah Cricket Stadium, Sharjah, UAE
Umpires: VK Ramaswamy (IND) and PD Reporter (IND)
Player of the match: RJ Ratnayake (SL)

- Sri Lanka won the toss and elected to field.

21 December 1990
Scorecard
Wisden report

Pakistan; 181/9 (43 overs)	v	Sri Lanka; 131/9 (43 overs)
Ijaz Ahmed 54 (78); KPJ Warnaweera 2/26 (9 overs)		HP Tillakaratne 27 (67); Mushtaq Ahmed 3/14 (6 overs)

Pakistan won by 50 runs
Sharjah Cricket Stadium, Sharjah, UAE
Umpires: VK Ramaswamy (IND) and PD Reporter (IND)
Player of the match: Ijaz Ahmed (PAK)

- Sri Lanka won the toss and elected to field.
- The match was reduced to 43 overs per side.
- Aamer Sohail (PAK) and CP Senanayake (SL) made their ODI debuts.

== See also ==
- Sharjah Cup
