= Madol Doova =

1947 book by Martin Wickramasinghe

- Language: Sinhala
- Genre: Children's literature
- Publication date: 1947
- Publication place: Sri Lanka
- Media type: Print (paperback)

Madol Doova (Sinhala: මඩොල් දූව) is a children's novel and coming-of-age story written by Sri Lankan writer Martin Wickramasinghe and first published in 1947. The book recounts the misadventures of Upali Giniwella and his friends on the Southern coast of Sri Lanka during the 1890s. It later describes the efforts of Upali and his friend Jinna to lead their lives in a small deserted island. The novel has been translated into several languages, and was made into a film of the same name in 1976.

== Story in brief ==
Upali Giniwella is a boy living in a village in southern Sri Lanka. He had lost his mother at a young age about 7 years old, and is under the care of a stepmother. Jinna is the servant boy of their house, and is a close and devoted friend to Upali. The two boys get into a lot of mischief in the village with their boy gang, and is severely punished by Upali's father as a result. Upali is eventually sent to away to a new school, and has to live with a school teacher. When he returns home, the two boys are caught trying to raid an orchard. Afraid that they will be sent away to work or given up to the police, Upali and Jinna run away from home and end up working for a farmer named Podigamarala.

While working, the two boys see an island covered by dense forest, and decide to go and live there. They learn that the deserted island, Madol Doova, is believed to be haunted, but start farming there with the help of Podigamarala. After spotting a mysterious light on the island, which was supposedly the ghost haunting it, they follow it and find out that it is in reality a fugitive hiding from the law. Meanwhile, another man named Punchi Mahattaya arrives on the island and later helps them with their work. When Upali hears that his father is taken ill, he returns home and helps out his stepmother and stepbrother. After settling up a legal issue for farming on government land, he finally returns to the plantation on Madol Doova, which had now developed into a prosperous venture with the help of Jinna.

== Story and characters ==
The name of the story, "Madol Doova", means "island of mangroves" in the Sinhala language. The story takes place in the 1890s, and portrays the lifestyles and culture of that period. It is presented as a narrative by Upali Giniwella, and views the adults' treatment of the children and the inability to understand them, in a sarcastic and humorous way. Madol Doova is presented in simple language,

Upali and Jinna are the two main characters of the story. Upali is boy who likes to be independent and is the leader of a boy gang in his village. He likes heroism and adventure. Although mischievous at first, he learns to be responsible later on. Upali's devoted friend and helper, Jinna, is an enthusiastic and courageous boy and Upali admits that he could not have managed without Jinna. Other characters include Podigamarala, a helpful farmer who allows the boys to work for him and teaches them farming and handling firearms and later helps them when they go to Madol Doova, and Punchi Mahattaya, a lazy and idle man who arrives at the island and starts to live there with Upali and Jinna. Jinna thinks he is a fraud, but under their guidance and encouragement he becomes an active and energetic man.

== Reception and adaptations ==
Madol Doova was first published in 1947 in Sinhala, as a children's novel. It soon became very popular, and was translated into English. It was later translated into several other languages as well, including Tamil, Japanese, Chinese, Russian, Dutch, Romanian and Bulgarian. Although some critics have doubted if the book sets an example to children because of the mischief done by Upali and his friends, it is seen as a depiction of the reforming and courage of a child who was once a "notorious imp".

Madol Doova is one of Martin Wickramasinghe's best known books. The novel was later adapted into a film as Madol Duwa (Enchanted Island) in 1976 by Sri Lankan film maker Lester James Peries. It was also made into a teledrama.

== See also ==
- Madol Duwa
- Martin Wickramasinghe
- Koggala Lagoon
