= Dinesh de Zoysa =

Sri Lankan cricketer (born 1977)

Dinesh de Zoysa (born 5 October 1977) is a Sri Lankan former first-class cricketer, active 1997–98, who played for Colts Cricket Club. A right-handed batsman and a right-arm bowler, he was born in Colombo.

De Zoysa made a single first-class appearance for Colts against Bloomfield Cricket and Athletic Club, scoring 0 not out in the first innings and 1 in the second. He bowled two overs in the match, taking a single wicket, that of Sajeeka Abeynayake, without conceding a run.
