= Yuganthaya (film) =

1983 film by Lester James Peries

- Directed by: Lester James Peries
- Written by: A.J. Gunawardena
- Starring: Gamini Fonseka; Richard De Zoysa; Ramani Bartholomeusz; Wickrema Bogoda
- Cinematography: William Blake
- Edited by: Gladwin Fernando
- Music by: Premasiri Khemadasa
- Distributed by: Tharanga Chithrapata
- Release date: 27 December 1983
- Running time: 130 minutes
- Country: Sri Lanka
- Language: Sinhala

Yuganthaya is a 1983 Sri Lankan drama film directed by Lester James Peries; it was adapted from the 1949 novel Yuganthaya by Martin Wickramasinghe, and deals with the beginning of labor unions in Sri Lanka.

The film won Lester Sri Lanka's Presidential Award for best director. Critical reception was mixed, however, and some critics considered the film not at par with Lester's earlier films. It was entered into the 14th Moscow International Film Festival.

== Plot ==
Simon Kabilana (Gamini Fonseka) is a powerful ruthless capitalist who uses terror to keep his workers under control and yield high production quotas. His son Malin (Richard De Zoysa) is the complete opposite, coming back from England idolizing Marx and Lenin, causing the father and son to clash. Malin eventually gives up his fortune in his father's company and works toward a confrontation with his father.

== Cast ==
- Gamini Fonseka as Simon Kabilana
- Suvineetha Weerasinghe as Nalika
- Richard De Zoysa as Malin
- Ramani Bartholomeusz as Chamari
- Mahal Wijewardena
- Punya Heendeniya
- Douglas Ranasinghe as Aravinda
- Chitra Wakishta
- Miyuri Samarasinghe

== Production ==
The film was shot on 35mm and used eastmancolor.
