= Gamperaliya (novel) =

1944 novel

- Author: Martin Wickremasinghe
- Language: Sinhala
- Genre: Historical novel
- Publication date: 1944
- Publication place: Sri Lanka
- Media type: Print (paperback)
- Followed by: Kaliyugaya & Yuganthaya

Gamperaliya (The Transformation of a Village) is a novel written by Sri Lankan writer Martin Wickremasinghe and first published in 1944. Wickremasinghe subsequently wrote Kaliyugaya and Yuganthaya, as a trilogy encompassing three generation of the same family and the changing society, culture and economic environment of Sri Lanka between the early and mid 20th century.

Gamperaliya is considered to be one of Wickremasinghe's most famous works, with the novel depicting the breakup of traditional village life due to the impact of modernisation. The gradual subversion of the traditional economic and social structure of the village by the commercial culture of the city is portrayed through the story of an aristocratic family in a southern village. The novel has been widely praised for its realism in depicting Sinhala rural life and is considered an important work of Sri Lankan literature.

The novel was adapted into a film in 1964 by Lester James Peries.

== Plot ==
The story begins in the early 20th century in Koggala, a hamlet in the south of Sri Lanka. Piyal teaches English to Anula and Nanda, the daughters of Muhandiram Kaisaruwaththa at the Maha Gedara, their ancestral manor. Piyal falls in love with Nanda, but she is from a high caste Govigama family and her parents disagree to give Nanda in marriage to Piyal and instead she is married to Jinadasa Lamahewa, who is also from a high caste family. Piyal leaves the village and finds a job in Colombo and becomes rich.

After a couple of years, Muhandiram Kaisaruwaththa dies, and the family declines financially. Jinadasa leaves for Sinhale to start a business. Tissa, having completed his education, goes to Colombo in search of a job.

Years passed, and Piyal, now a rich man who owns a mansion in Colombo, visits his village. Nanda, her mother and sister join Piyal and his mother on a pilgrimage, where Nanda and Piyal meet again. Jinadasa, unsuccessful in business, dies penniless. Piyal marries Nanda in a grand European-fashioned wedding and they go and live in his residence in Colombo.

== See also ==
- List of Sri Lankan films
