= Kaliyugaya (novel) =

1957 novel by Martin Wickremasinghe

- Author: Martin Wickremasinghe
- Language: Sinhala
- Genre: Historical novel
- Publication date: 1957
- Publication place: Sri Lanka
- Media type: Print (paperback)
- Preceded by: Gamperaliya
- Followed by: Yuganthaya

Kaliyugaya (Sinhala, Age of Darkness) is a novel written by Sinhala writer Martin Wickremasinghe and first published in 1957. It is the second book of Wickremasinghe's trilogy that started with Gamperaliya - transformation of a village. The final book, published in 1983, of the trilogy is Yuganthaya (culmination of the era).

It was adapted into a movie by Lester James Peries in 1981.

The story follows the events of Wickramasinghe's novel Gamperaliya and depicts the lives of Nanda and Piyal after their marriage and their children.
