= Ja-Ela Electoral District =

Electoral district of Sri Lanka

Ja-Ela electoral district was an electoral district of Sri Lanka between August 1947 and February 1989. The district was named after the town of Ja-Ela in present-day Gampaha District, Western Province. The 1978 Constitution of Sri Lanka introduced the proportional representation electoral system for electing members of Parliament. The existing 160 mainly single-member electoral districts were replaced with 22 multi-member electoral districts. Ja-Ela electoral district was replaced by the Gampaha multi-member electoral district at the 1989 general elections, the first under the PR system, though Ja-Ela continues to be a polling division of the multi-member electoral district.

== Members of Parliament ==
Key

Independent SLFP UNP

| Election | Member | Party | Term |
|---|---|---|---|
| 1947 | D. P. Jayasuriya | UNP | 1947-1952 |
| 1952 | D. P. Jayasuriya | UNP | 1952-1956 |
| 1956 | Stanley de Zoysa | SLFP | 1956-1960 |
| 1960 | G. J. Paris Perera | UNP | 1960-1960 |
| 1960 | G. J. Paris Perera | UNP | 1960-1965 |
| 1965 | G. J. Paris Perera | UNP | 1965-1970 |
| 1970 | G. J. Paris Perera | UNP | 1970-1976 |
| 1976 (by-election) | M. Joseph Michael Perera | UNP | 1976-1977 |
| 1977 | M. Joseph Michael Perera | UNP | 1977-1989 |

== Elections ==
=== 1947 Parliamentary General Election ===
Results of the 1st parliamentary election held between 23 August 1947 and 20 September 1947 for the district:

| Candidate | Party | Symbol | Votes | % |
|---|---|---|---|---|
| D. P. Jayasuriya | | Hand | 11,133 | 50.08% |
| P. N. Siriwardena | | Umbrella | 8,406 | 37.82% |
| Stanley Mendis | | Elephant | 1,913 | 8.61% |
| F. Nettisinghe | | House | 777 | 3.50% |
| Valid Votes | | | 22,229 | 100.00% |
| Rejected Votes | | | 393 | |
| Total Polled | | | 22,622 | |
| Registered Electors | | | 51,274 | |
| Turnout | | | | 44.12 |

=== 1952 Parliamentary General Election ===
Results of the 2nd parliamentary election held between 24 May 1952 and 30 May 1952 for the district:

| Candidate | Party | Symbol | Votes | % |
|---|---|---|---|---|
| D. P. Jayasuriya | United National Party | Star | 18,212 | 58.12% |
| Lassin Wewala Panditha | Lanka Sama Samaja Party | Elephant | 6,308 | 20.13% |
| S. Stock Anthony | Sri Lanka Freedom Party | House | 5,790 | 18.48% |
| D. F. Hettiaratchyge | | Hand | 1,025 | 3.27% |
| Valid Votes | | | 31,335 | 100.00% |
| Rejected Votes | | | 357 | |
| Total Polled | | | 31,692 | |
| Registered Electors | | | 55,368 | |
| Turnout | | | | 57.24 |

=== 1956 Parliamentary General Election ===
Results of the 3rd parliamentary election held between 5 April 1956 and 10 April 1956 for the district:

| Candidate | Party | Symbol | Votes | % |
|---|---|---|---|---|
| Stanley de Zoysa | Sri Lanka Freedom Party | Hand | 24,381 | 55.27% |
| G. J. Paris Perera | United National Party | Elephant | 19,132 | 43.37% |
| Don Martin Jayamahamudalige | | Bicycle | 596 | 1.35% |
| Valid Votes | | | 44,109 | 100.00% |
| Rejected Votes | | | 205 | |
| Total Polled | | | 44,314 | |
| Registered Electors | | | 61,091 | |
| Turnout | 72.54 | | | |

=== 1960 (March) Parliamentary General Election ===
Results of the 4th parliamentary election held on 19 March 1960 for the district:

| Candidate | Party | Symbol | Votes | % |
|---|---|---|---|---|
| G. J. Paris Perera | United National Party | Elephant | 11,960 | 43.84% |
| D. Oliver Jayasuriya | Sri Lanka Freedom Party | Hand | 8,765 | 32.13% |
| Stanley de Zoysa | Lanka Prajathanthravadi Pakshaya | Umbrella | 4,224 | 15.48% |
| Edward de Silva | | Key | 2,331 | 8.54% |
| Valid Votes | | | 27,280 | 100.00% |
| Rejected Votes | | | 170 | |
| Total Polled | | | 27,450 | |
| Registered Electors | | | 34,002 | |
| Turnout | | | | 80.73 |

=== 1960 (July) Parliamentary General Election ===
Results of the 5th parliamentary election held on 20 July 1960 for the district:

| Candidate | Party | Symbol | Votes | % |
|---|---|---|---|---|
| G. J. Paris Perera | United National Party | Elephant | 13,622 | 50.34% |
| D. Oliver Jayasuriya | Sri Lanka Freedom Party | Hand | 10,898 | 40.27% |
| Stanley de Zoysa | Lanka Prajathanthravadi Pakshaya | Umbrella | 2,308 | 8.53% |
| D. G. B. Joseph | | Cart Wheel | 234 | 0.86% |
| Valid Votes | | | 27,062 | 100.00% |
| Rejected Votes | | | 119 | |
| Total Polled | | | 27,181 | |
| Registered Electors | | | 34,002 | |
| Turnout | | | | 79.94 |

=== 1965 Parliamentary General Election ===
Results of the 6th parliamentary election held on 22 March 1965 for the district:

| Candidate | Party | Symbol | Votes | % |
|---|---|---|---|---|
| G. J. Paris Perera | United National Party | Elephant | 21,867 | 61.22% |
| D. Oliver Jayasuriya | Sri Lanka Freedom Party | Hand | 13,850 | 38.78% |
| Valid Votes | | | 35,717 | 100.00% |
| Rejected Votes | | | 133 | |
| Total Polled | | | 35,850 | |
| Registered Electors | | | 43,432 | |
| Turnout | | | | 82.54 |

=== 1970 Parliamentary General Election ===
Results of the 7th parliamentary election held on 27 May 1970 for the district:

| Candidate | Party | Symbol | Votes | % |
|---|---|---|---|---|
| G. J. Paris Perera | United National Party | Elephant | 21,657 | 49.69% |
| Shelton Amarasekera | Sri Lanka Freedom Party | Hand | 19,762 | 45.34% |
| Peter Mendis | | Lamp | 2,166 | 4.97% |
| Valid Votes | | | 43,585 | 100.00% |
| Rejected Votes | | | 71 | |
| Total Polled | | | 43,656 | |
| Registered Electors | | | 52,066 | |
| Turnout | | | | 83.85 |

=== 1977 Parliamentary General Election ===
Results of the 8th parliamentary election held on 21 July 1977 for the district:

| Candidate | Party | Symbol | Votes | % |
|---|---|---|---|---|
| M. Joseph Michael Perera | United National Party | Elephant | 31,054 | 49.69% |
| Peter Mendis | Sri Lanka Freedom Party | Hand | 14,802 | 45.34% |
| L. D. Silva | | Key | 1,737 | 4.97% |
| Valid Votes | | | 47,593 | 100.00% |
| Rejected Votes | | | 130 | |
| Total Polled | | | 47,723 | |
| Registered Electors | | | 56,839 | |
| Turnout | | | | 83.96 |
