= Soysa =

Soysa or de Soysa is a surname. Notable people with the surname include:

- A. J. R. de Soysa, Ceylonese landed proprietor and politician
- Bennet Soysa, Ceylonese politician and philanthropist
- Bernard Soysa, Sri Lankan politician
- Chamara de Soysa, Sri Lankan cricketer
- Charles Henry de Soysa, Ceylonese entrepreneur and philanthropist
- Dilshan de Soysa, Sri Lankan cricketer
- Evelyn de Soysa, Sri Lankan politician
- Gamini Vijith Vijithamuni Soysa, Sri Lankan politician
- Harold de Soysa, Ceylonese Anglican bishop
- Jeronis de Soysa, Ceylonese entrepreneur and philanthropist
- Priyani Soysa, Sri Lankan scientist
  - Arseculeratne v. Priyani Soysa, a court case
- Punsiri Soysa, Sri Lankan singer
- Rohan Soysa, Sri Lankan cricketer
- Ryle de Soysa, Sri Lankan cricketer and entrepreneur
- Thusith de Soysa, Sri Lankan cricketer
- Wasantha Soysa, Sri Lankan karateka
- Wilfred de Soysa, Ceylonese entrepreneur, landed proprietor and philanthropist
- Yohan Soysa, Sri Lankan cricketer

== See also ==
- De Soysa Stadium, Moratuwa, Sri Lanka
- (de) Zoysa, a surname
