= Martin Wickramasinghe =

Sri Lankan journalist, writer (1890–1976)

Martin Wickramasinghe MBE
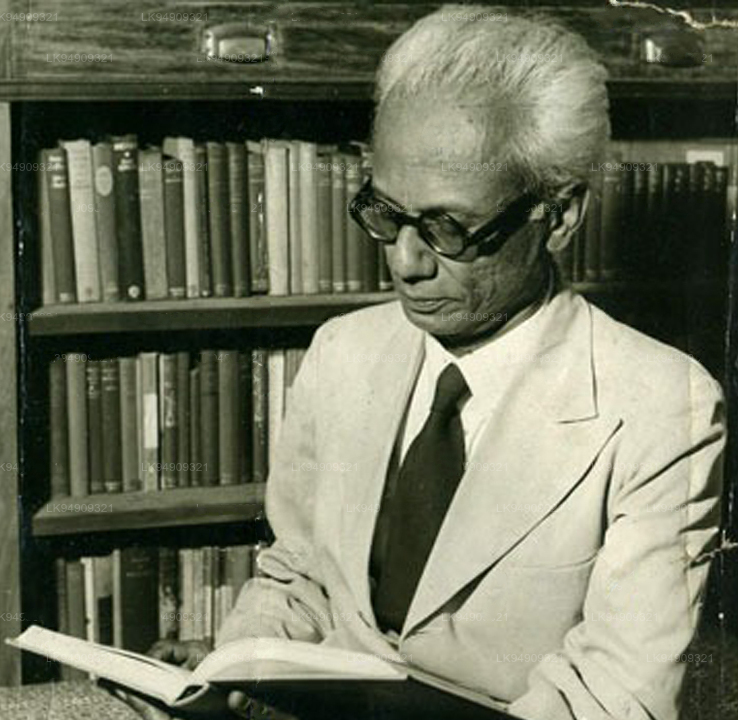
- Born: Lama Hewage Don Martin Wickramasinghe; 29 May 1890; Koggala, British Ceylon
- Died: 23 July 1976 (aged 86); Colombo, Sri Lanka
- Occupations: Journalist; author
- Years active: 1914–1976
- Spouse: Kataluwe Balage Prema de Silva
- Children: 6, including Sarath Kusum Wickramasinghe
- Website: martinwickramasinghe.info

Lama Hewage Don Martin Wickramasinghe, MBE (commonly known as Martin Wickramasinghe) (Sinhala: මාර්ටින් වික්‍රමසිංහ) (29 May 1890 – 23 July 1976) was a Sri Lankan journalist and author. His books have been translated into several different languages. Martin Wickramasinghe is often acclaimed as the father of modern Sinhala literature.

== Early life ==
Born Lama Hewage Don Martin Wickramasinghe, on 29 May 1890, in the town of Koggala (Galle District), as the only son of Lamahewage Don Bastian Wickramasinghe (father) and Magalle Balapitiya Liyanage Thochchohamy (mother).

At the age of five Wickramasinghe was taught the Sinhala alphabet, at home and in the village temple, by a monk, Andiris Gurunnanse. He also learned the Devanagari script and could recite by memory long sections of the Hitopadesa. After two years he was taken to a vernacular school where he prospered until 1897 when he was sent to an English school in Galle called Buona Vista . In the two years spent at the school Wickramasinghe became fluent in English as well as Latin. When his father died in 1901, he returned to a vernacular school in Ahangama and subsequently lost interest in schooling.

Having left school, at the age of 16 years Wickramasinghe found work as a book-keeper in a shop in Colombo owned by Carolis Silva in 1906. Following year he left the shop to join a commissions agency run by John Silva. In 1910, his mother dies. Following the 1915 Sinhalese-Muslim riots, John Silva's agency was closed and he returned to Koggala. He then became a book-keeper at Cornelis Silva's shop in Batticaloa.

== Journalism career ==
In 1916, Martin Wickramasinghe starts to write to the Sinhala daily Dinamina under the penname Hethu Vaadi (Rationalist) and pens a controversial series called "Plants and Animals". He then joins the editorial staff of Dinamina, owned by the press baron D. R. Wijewardena's Associated Newspapers of Ceylon Limited (ANCL). In 1927, he leaves Dinamina to join Lakmina. In 1931, he returns to ANCL as the editor of Sinhala weekend paper Silumina. In 1932, he was appointed editor of Dinamina, serving until his resignation in 1946.

== Literary career ==
His literary career began with the novel Leela (1914) and an anthology of essays on literary criticism, Shastriya Lekhana (1919). Shortly thereafter he began a campaign to raise literary standards for the Sinhalese reading public with work such as Sahityodaya Katha (1932), Vichara Lipi (1941), Guttila Geetaya (1943) and Sinhala Sahityaye Nageema (1946) in which he evaluated the traditional literally heritage according to set rules of critical criteria formed by synthesising the best in Indian and western traditions of literary criticism.

Through the 1940s Wickramasinghe dabbled with the double role of literary critic and creative writer. Gamperaliya (1944) is widely held as the first Sinhalese novel with a serious intent that compares, in content and technique, with the great novels of modern world literature. The novel depicts the crumbling of traditional village life under the pressure of modernisation. The story of a successful family in a Southern village is used to portray the gradual replacement of traditional economic and social structure of the village by commercial city influence.

Wickramasinghe followed Gamperaliya with Yuganthaya (1948) and Kaliyugaya (1957) forming a trilogy. After the decay of the traditional life, the story details the rise of the bourgeoisie, with its urban base and entrepreneurial drive, ending with the formation of the labour movement and socialist theology and rise of hopes for a new social order. The trilogy was made into film by the renowned Sri Lankan director Lester James Peries.

With the development of a literary criticism movement in the early-'50s, Wickramasinghe presented the works Sahitya Kalava ('The Art of Literature' 1950) and Kawya Vicharaya ('The Criticism of Poetry' 1954). Wickramasinghe was appointed a member of the Radio Broadcasting Commission in 1953 and in 1954 was appointed to the National Languages Commission, from which he resigned three months later. He was appointed a Member of the Order of the British Empire (MBE) in the 1953 Coronation Honours with the ensign awarded by Her Majesty Queen Elizabeth II in person during her Royal Visit to Ceylon in 1954.

Wickramasinghe's most heralded work came in 1956 with Viragaya. Due to the significance of its theme and the sophistication of its technique, the novel has come to be hailed as the greatest work of Sinhalese fiction. It follows the spiritual problems of a fragile Sinhalese youth raised in a traditional Buddhist home after being confronted with the spectre of adulthood and the responsibilities that come with it all made more complex with the modernisation of society. First-person narrative is used to put forth the autobiographical story of the anti-hero in impressionistic vignettes rather than in chronological order. It is a seminal work and spawned a spew of imitators, some good on their own right.

== Peradeniya school and poet ==
Wickramasinghe was an early practitioner of the genre of poetry called nisandas, which ignored the restrictions placed on poetry by the traditional prosodic patterns. It drew inspiration from the work of Eliot, Pound, Whitman and other western poets and was part of a movement called Peradeniya School. Wickramasinghe's work was Teri Gi (1952).

The movement dissolved in the 1960s prompted by Wickramasinghe's contention that other writers of the Peradeniya School were not sensitive to cultural traditions and the Buddhist background of Sinhalese society. He accused Ediriweera Sarachchandra, Gunadasa Amarasekara and others of imitating "decadent" western and post-war Japanese literature and of supporting a nihilistic look on life with cynical disregard for national tradition.

== Later years ==
Wickramasinghe visited Cuba on the invitation of the Cuban Government in 1968. In 1973, Wickramasinghe wrote a new biography of Buddha titled Bava Taranaya. In it the great teacher's change from royal heir in-waiting to philosopher-mendicant is portrayed as being a result of his sympathy to the poor and the downtrodden of society. That same year, he was nominated for the Nobel Prize in Literature by Ediriweera Sarachchandra.

Wickramasinghe died on 23 July 1976 and his home is now a folk museum.

== Personal life ==
Wickramasinghe married Kataluwe Balage Prema de Silva on 30 November 1925. They move to Mount-Lavinia, where their first child Susantha Manuwarna died three months after birth. They would have six more children, three sons and three daughters. Their eldest surviving son Sarath Kusum Wickramasinghe, served as Sri Lankan High Commissioner to the United Kingdom from 1995 to 1999. Wickramasinghe built himself a house Samudrasanna Road, Mount-Lavinia in 1939. In 1941, his family home in Koggala was taken over by the British military when RAF Koggala was established during World War II. In 1950, he sold his house in Mount-Lavinia and moved to Thimbirigasyaya to allow his children to attend university. In 1956, he moved to Bandarawela, where he took up residence.

== Honors and awards ==
- Member of the Order of the British Empire (MBE) - 1953
- Appointed Member of the Radio Broadcasting Commission – 1953
- Award for the best news paper article for the year "The fall of the Brahmin Class" – 1956
- The novel "Viragaya" wins the Don Pedric Award for the best novel of the year – 1957
- Awarded an Honorary PhD by the Vidyodaya University – 1960
- Awarded a DLitt by the University of Ceylon – 1963
- UNESCO Award for his book "The Rise of the Soviet Land" – 1964
- Awarded a DLitt by Vidyalankara University −1964
- Awarded a DLitt by the University of Ceylon, Colombo – 1970
- Receives the first Presidential Award for Literature – 1974

== Publications ==
A comprehensive list of publications of Martin Wikramasinghe,

Novels

- Leela (1914)
- Soma (1920)
- Irangani (1923)
- Seetha (1923)
- Miringu Diya (Mirage) (1925)
- Unmada Chitra (1929)
- Rohini (1929)
- Gamperaliya (The Uprooted/Changing Village) (1944)
- Madol Doova (Mangrove Island) (1947)
- Yuganthaya (End of the Era) (1949)
- Viragaya (Devoid of Passions) (1956)
- Kaliyugaya (Age of Destruction) (1957)
- Karuvala Gedara (House of Shadows) (1963)
- Bhavatharanaya (Siddhartha's Quest) (1973)

Collections of short stories

- Geheniyak (A Woman) (1924)
- Magul Gedara (The Wedding) (1927)
- Pavkarayata Galgesima (Stoning the Sinner) (1936)
- Apuru Muhuna (The Strange Face) (1944)
- Handa Sakki Kima (The Moon is Witness) (1945)
- Mara Yuddhaya (Mara's War) (1945)
- Mage Kathawa (My Story) (1947)
- Vahallu (Bondage) (1951)

Plays

- Chithra (1940)
- Mayuri (1944)
- Vijitha (1952)

Literary criticism

- Shastriya Lekshana (Educational Essays) (1919)
- Sinhala Sahitya Katha (Sinhala Literary Essays) (1932)
- Sahitya Shiksha 1 (Essays on Literatura) (1936)
- Sahitya Shiksha 2 (1938)
- Vichara Lipi (Literary Criticism) (1941)
- Guttila Gitaya 1 (Critical Review) (1943)
- Sinhala Sahityaye Negima (Landmarks of Sinhala Literature) (1945)
- Sahitya Kalava (Art of Literature) (1950)
- Kavya Vicharaya (Sinhala Poetry:A critical Review) (1954)
- Atta Yutta (Essays in Literature) (1955)
- Bana Katha Sahitya (Buddhist Folk Literature) (1955)
- Nava Padya Sinhalaya (Modern Sinhala Poetry) (1957)
- Rasavadaya Ha Bauddha Kavyaya (Aesthetics and Buddhist Poetry) (1961)
- Sinhala Vichara Maga (Sinhala Literary Criticism) (1964)
- Navakathanga Ha Viragaya (Literary Aspects of Buddhist Jataka Stories) (1968)
- Sinhala Navakathawa Ha Japan Kama Katha Sevanella (The Sinhala Novel in the Shadow of the Japanese Erotic Novel) (1969)
- Sinhala Natakaya Ha Sanda Kinduruwa (Sanda Kinduru and Sinhala Drama) (1970)
- Sampradaya Ha Vicharaya (Tradition and Criticism) (1971)
- Vyavahara Bhashava Ha Parinama Dharmaya (Contemporary Sinhala and Its Evolotion) (?)

Evolution and Anthropology

- Sathwa Sanhathiya (Biological Evolution) (1934)
- Bhavakarma Vikashaya (An Unorthodox Interpretation of Buddhist Philosophy) (1967)
- Manava Vidyava Ha Bauddha Vignana Vadaya (Anthropology and Buddhist Idealism) (1974)

Philosophy

- Sinhala Lakuna (The Sinhalese Identity) (1947)
- Budu Samaya Ha Samaja Darshanaya (Buddhism and Social Philosophy) (1948)
- Denuma Ha Dekuma (Knowledge and Reality) (1958)
- Sinhala Sakaskada (Sociological Writings) (1962)
- Bauddha Darshanaya Ha Margaya (Buddhist Philosophy and the Way) (1968)
- Nivan Muhunuvara Ha Bamunu Dittiya (Face of Nirvana and Brahmin Dogma) (1972)

Autobiography

- Ape Gama (Our Village) (1940)
- Upanda Sita (From My Childhood) (1961)

Biography

- Chechov Ha Lankava (Chechov and Sri Lanka) (1970)
- Ape Urumaya Ha Bhikshun Vahanse (The contribution of Buddhist Monks to our Cultural Heritage) (?)
- Ape Viyath Parapura Ha Bhasha Samaja Parinamaya (The role of Our Leaders in the Evolution of Our Language and Society) (?)

Books in English

- Aspects of Sinhalese Culture (1952)
- The Buddhist Jataka Stories and the Russian Novel (1952)
- The Mysticism of D H Lawrence (1957)
- Buddhism and Culture (1964)
- Revolution and Evolution (1971)
- Buddhism and Art (1973)
- Sinhala Language and Culture (1975)

History

- Purana Sinhala Stringe Enduma (Women's Attire in Ancient Lanka) (1935)
- Kalunika Sevima (Search for Our Past) (1950)

Travel

- Soviet Deshaye Negima (The Rise of the Soviet Union) (1962)

== Translations in other languages ==
Books translated in to other languages,

Bulgarian

- Madol Doova (1961)

Chinese

- A Collection of Short Stories (1961)
- Madol Doova (1961)

Dutch

- Madol Doova (1979)

English

- Landmarks of Sinhala Literature (1948)
- Lay Bare the Roots (Ape Gama) (1958)
- Madol Doova (1968)
- The Way of the Lotus (Viragaya) (1985)

French

- Viragaya (1995)

Japanese

- Madol Doova (2002)

Romanian

- Madol Doova (1962)

Russian

- Madol Doova (1954)
- A Collection of Short Stories 1 (1958)
- A Collection of Short Stories 2 (1970)
- Trilogy: Gamperaliya, Kaliyugaya, Yuganthaya (1975)

Tamil

- Gamperaliya (1964)
- Viragaya (1992)
- Madol Doova (1993)

== Films and television productions ==
Films and television productions, based on Martin Wikramasinghe's books,

Feature films

- Gamperaliya (1963)
- Madol Doova (1976)
- Kaliyugaya (1981)
- Yuganthaya (1983)
- Viragaya (1987)
- "Karuwala Gedara"(_)

Television

- Leli (Daughter in law) (1989)
- Gamperaliya (1989)
- Mamage Duwa (1992)
- Madol Doova (1994)
- Upasakamma (The Pious Woman) (1994)
- Mudiyanse Mama (Honourable Uncle) (1994)
- Mava (Mother) (1994)
- Sisiliyata Padamak (A Lesson for Ceciliya) (1994)

== Martin Wickramasinghe Trust ==
Martin Wickramasinghe Trust is an approved by the Government of Sri Lanka as a charitable organization. The Martin Wickramasinghe Trust has been established with the objectives of preservation of manuscripts, first editions of all his books, tape recording and photographs related to his life and work. Martin Wickramasinghe Folk Museum in Koggala also operated by Martin Wickramasinghe Trust Fund.

=== Martin Wickramasinghe Collection ===
A library was not established at Koggala, and Wickramasinghe's personal collection of books, draft manuscripts, are stored under the Martin Wickramasinghe Collection in the National Library of Sri Lanka, after these were dontated by the Martin Wickramasinghe Trust.
