= Stanley de Zoysa =

Sri Lankan politician (1907–1970)

Hon. Stanley de Zoysa

Minister of Finance
- In office 12 April 1956 – 22 November 1959
- Prime Minister: S. W. R. D. Bandaranaike
- Preceded by: M. D. H. Jayawardena
- Succeeded by: M. M. Mustapha

Personal details
- Born: 27 June 1907
- Died: 10 December 1970
- Spouse: Sheila de Zoysa
- Education: Royal College, Colombo
- Occupation: Businessmen

Stanley de Zoysa (27 June 1907 – 10 December 1970) was a Sri Lankan businessmen and politician. He was the former Cabinet Minister of Finance (1956–1959) in S. W. R. D. Bandaranaike's government, subsequently Minister of Interior (1959–1960) and Ceylon's Ambassador to Indonesia.

De Zoysa was the son of Sir Francis de Zoysa, KC an Advocate and member of the first State Council, and Lady Ethel Perera Amarasekera Siriwardena. He had several siblings, some of whom gained prominence in several fields: Sydney de Zoysa (former Deputy inspector general of police), A. C. "Bunty" de Zoysa (President's Counsel), Violet Rajapakse (who married Tudor Rajapakse), Olga de Zoysa (first Miss Ceylon), and Lucien de Zoysa (famous cricket commentator). His uncle was Sir Ernest de Silva.

Sydney de Zoysa was educated at the Royal College, Colombo, he went into business and became a prominent businessmen. Joining the Sri Lanka Freedom Party, he contest the 1956 general election from the Ja-Ela electorate and was elected to parliament defeating the United National Party candidate G. J. Paris Perera. He was appointed Minister of Finance on 12 April 1956 by Prime Minister Bandaranaike. He was forced to resign on 23 November 1959 following the arrest of his brother F. R. de Zoysa and his former bodyguard Ossie Corea as a result of the investigation into the Bandaranaike assassination. Both F. R. de Zoysa and Ossie Corea were released although it was found the murder weapon belong to Corea. Sydney de Zoysa was subsequently appointed Minister of the Interior in 1959 and served till 1960 when parliament was dissolved for elections. He contest the Ja-Ela electorate in the 1960 March general election and in the 1960 July general election from the Lanka Prajathanthravadi Pakshaya, but was defeated by G. J. Paris Perera. He was appointed Ceylon's Ambassador to Indonesia in the late 1960s and served till 1970. He was married to Sheila de Zoysa. He was a cousin of M. P. de Z. Siriwardena.
