= Francis de Zoysa =

Sri Lankan politician

Sir Francis Sreenath de Zoysa Abeysiriwardena, KC (1874–1942) was a Ceylonese lawyer and statesmen. He was a member of the State Council of Ceylon and a president of the Ceylon National Congress.

== Legal career ==
He was born in the coastal village of Balapitiya, to Demuni Dedrick de Zoysa Abeysiriwardena of Gamakarana Walauwa and Clara Wirasekara from Galhera, Ahungalle. De Zoysa qualified as an advocate of the Supreme Court of Ceylon, established a successful legal practice, and was appointed a King's Counsel.

== Political career ==
A president of the Ceylon National Congress, he was elected to the 2nd State Council of Ceylon from Balapitiya in the 1936 general election. In the State Council he introduced the Bribery Act.

== Family ==
He married Ethel Perera Amarasekera Siriwardena of Ragama Walauwa, and their children were:

- Sydney de Zoysa (former deputy inspector general of police)
- A. C. de Zoysa (President's Counsel)
- Violet Rajapakse (married to Tudor Rajapakse of Maha Kappina Walauwa, Balapitiya, pioneer member of Mahila Samithiya)
- Olga de Zoysa (first Miss Ceylon)
- Dickie de Zoysa (S. W. R. D. Bandaranaike's best man at his wedding)
- Gwendoline de Zoysa
- Stanley de Zoysa (former minister of finance)
- Lucien de Zoysa (cricketer, writer, actor and cricket commentator)
- Douglas de Zoysa
- Capt Kenneth de Zoysa
- Iris Wickremasinghe (first married to Michael de Zoysa Siriwardena, minister in Bandaranaike's cabinet, and then to Anton Wickremasinghe)
- Olive Amarasekera
