= Koggala =

Koggala කොග්ගල கொக்கலை
- Town
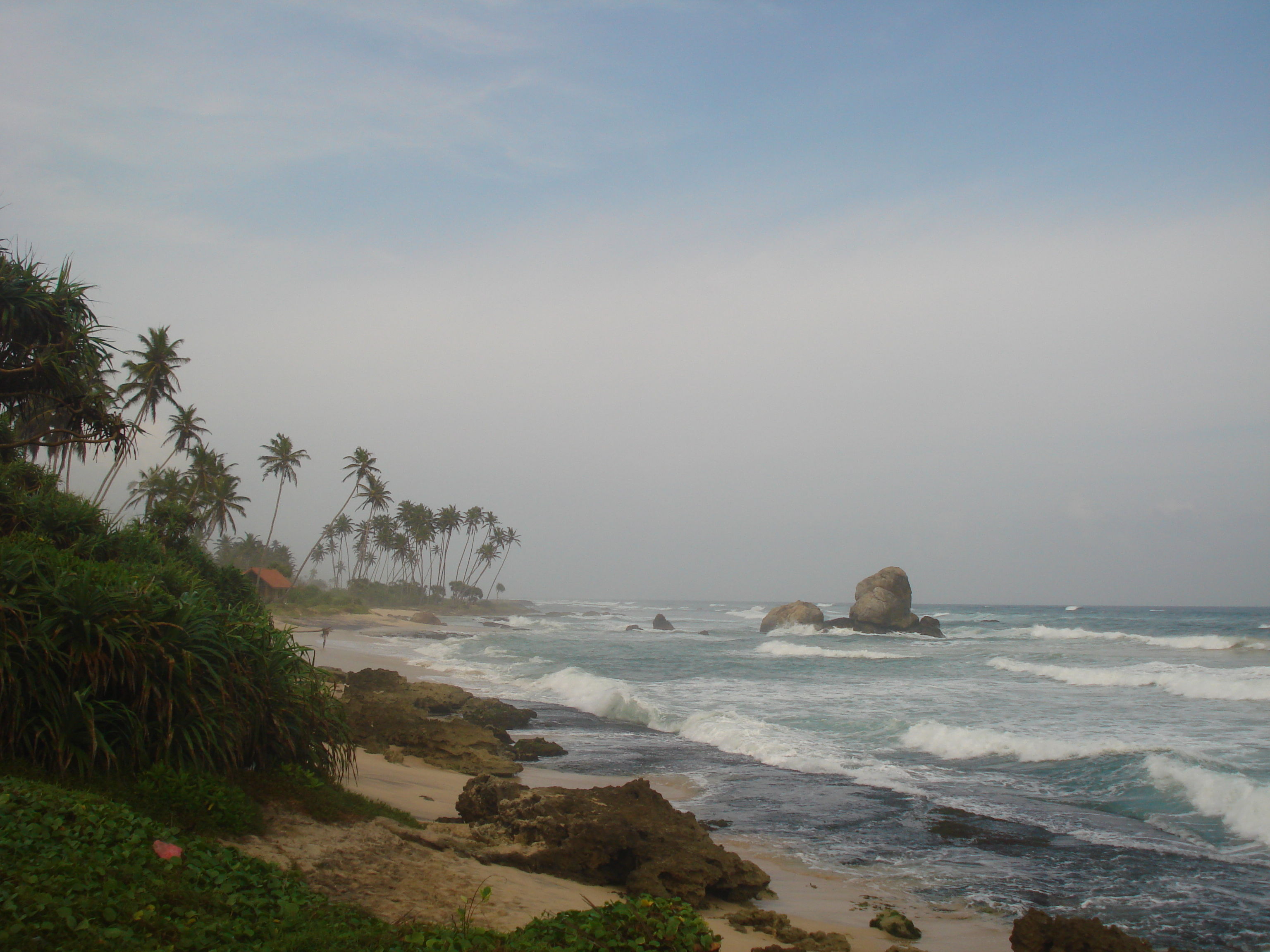
- Near Koggala beach

- Location in Sri Lanka
- Coordinates: 5°59′25″N 80°19′21″E
- Country: Sri Lanka
- Province: Southern Province
- District: Galle District
- Time zone: UTC+5:30 (Sri Lanka Standard Time Zone)
  - Summer (DST): UTC+6 (Summer time)
- Postal code: 80630
- Area code: 228

Koggala (Sinhala: කොග්ගල, romanized: Koggala; Tamil: கொக்கலை, romanized: Kokkalai) is a small coastal town, situated at the edge of a lagoon on the south coast of Sri Lanka, located in Galle District, Southern Province, Sri Lanka, governed by an Urban Council. Koggala is bounded on one side by a reef, and on the other by a large lake, Koggala Lake, into which the numerous tributaries of the Koggala Oya drain. It is approximately 139 kilometres (86 mi) south of Colombo and is situated at an elevation of 3 metres (9.8 ft) above sea level.

== History ==
Koggala has one of the longest beaches in Sri Lanka, and is located near the popular tourist resort of Unawatuna, Koggala in comparison is relatively uncluttered as a tourist destination and mostly unexplored.

Koggala was significantly affected by the tsunami caused by the 2004 Indian Ocean earthquake, where the waters measured 9.3 metres (31 ft) high.

It is the birthplace of noted Sri Lankan author Martin Wickramasinghe and a museum, Martin Wickramasinghe Folk Art Museum, dedicated to his arts and popular traditions in the town.

Approximately 5 kilometres (3.1 mi) east of Koggala is the Kataluva Purvarama Maha Viharaya temple, which was originally built in the 13th century and had some late 19th century additions. The temple is renowned for its Kandyan-style paintings in the main shrine, dating from the late 19th century. The paintings of musicians, dancers and European figures illustrates an interesting piece of social history. Some of the Jatake tales (episodes from the Buddha's series of 550 previous lives) are painted here, purportedly 200 years old. There are also some cameo-style paintings of Queen Victoria and the Queen Mother, done in gratitude for Queen Victoria's role in ensuring the free practice of Buddhism outlined in the Kandyan capitulation of Lanka in 1815.

Koggala is also the home to the Giniwella Kathaluwa and the ancient Temples. The Kathaluwa Buddhist temple is known for its murals and for the preserved first printing press, which was brought by the Dutch to Sri Lanka.

The area is also famous for its distinct stilt fishermen, who erect a single pole in the chest-deep water on the beach, just a few meters off-shore, where they perch on a cross bar and using bamboo fishing rods cast their lines out beyond the surf break to catch small fish.

During the World War II, Koggala was the largest flying-boat base in the Eastern world and the lake was considered a strategic landing point for seaplanes.

== Transport ==
Koggala is located on the Coastal or Southern Rail Line (connecting Colombo through to Matara), and the A2 highway, connecting Colombo to Wellawaya.

== Facilities ==
- Koggala railway station
- Koggala Airport

== Attractions ==
- Martin Wickramasinghe Folk Museum
- Koggala Lake
- Koggala Beach
- Turtle Hatcheries
- Kataluva Purvarama Maha Viharaya
- Stilt Fisherman

== Post and telephone ==
- Sri Lanka 00 94
- Area code 228
- Postal code 80630

== See also ==
- List of towns in Galle Province, Sri Lanka
- List of beaches in Sri Lanka
