= Yuganthaya =

1949 novel by Martin Wickremasinghe

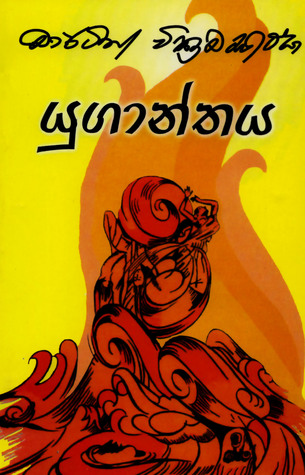
- Yuganthaya by Martin Wickramasinghe
- Author: Martin Wickremasinghe
- Language: Sinhala
- Genre: Historical novel
- Publication date: 1949
- Publication place: Sri Lanka
- Media type: Print (paperback)
- Preceded by: Kaliyugaya

Yuganthaya (Sinhala: යුගාන්තය "The End of an Era" or "Destiny") is a novel by Sri Lankan writer Martin Wickremasinghe which was first published in 1949. It is the third and last part of Wickramasinghe's trilogy that began with Gamperaliya and was followed by Kaliyugaya.

The novel was adapted into a movie of the same name in 1983 by Lester James Peries.
