= Lucien de Zoysa =

Sri Lankan cricketer, actor and playwright (1917–1995)

- Lucien de Zoysa in 1947

Personal information
- Full name: Lucien Edward de Zoysa
- Born: 1917; British Ceylon
- Died: 11 June 1995 (aged 78); Hendala, Wattala, Colombo, Sri Lanka
- Bowling: Right-arm leg-spin
- Relatives: Sir Francis de Zoysa (father); Richard de Zoysa (son); Michael de Zoysa (son)

Career statistics
Competition	First-class
Matches	12
Runs scored	55
Batting average	4.58
100s/50s	0/0
Top score	17
Balls bowled	2237
Wickets	38
Bowling average	25.81
5 wickets in innings	2
10 wickets in match	0
Best bowling	6/65
Catches/stumpings	2/–
- Source: CricketArchive, 25 February 2018

Lucien Edward de Zoysa (1917 – 1995) was a Ceylonese cricketer who played first-class cricket between 1947 and 1954. He became a stage actor, playwright, author, and cricket commentator on radio.

== Early life and education ==
Lucien de Zoysa was one of the 12 children of Sir Francis de Zoysa, a Ceylonese lawyer and statesman. He attended both of Ceylon's two pre-eminent schools: first S. Thomas' College, Mount Lavinia, and then Royal College, Colombo. In March and April 1936 he took part in the first visit to Australia by any cricket team from Asia when he toured with the Royal College team.

== Cricket career ==
A leg-spin bowler, de Zoysa played club cricket in Colombo with Sinhalese Sports Club. He was the leading wicket-taker when the club made a short tour of three non-first-class matches in India in 1945–46.

He played his first match for Ceylon in 1946–47, taking six wickets when the Ceylon Cricket Association team defeated a Southern India team in Madras by an innings. In 1949-50 he was easily the most successful bowler when Ceylon toured Pakistan. Ceylon lost three and drew two of the five matches, but de Zoysa took wickets consistently and finished with 21 wickets at an average of 16.23. In the match against Pakistan in Karachi he took 6 for 72 in the first innings, becoming the first Ceylonese player to take six wickets in an innings in an international match. A few days earlier, against the Commander-in-Chief's XI at Rawalpindi, he had taken his best first-class figures of 6 for 65 in the first innings.

In 1950-51 he was one of two Ceylonese cricketers (the other was Stanley Jayasinghe) invited to play for a combined Indian, Pakistani and Ceylonese side against the touring Commonwealth XI in Bombay.

== Later career ==
De Zoysa's main career was in the theatre. He was an actor and director, and wrote several English-language plays and stories based on the history and legends of Ceylon. He also became a cricket commentator on radio, providing English-language descriptions for many years in partnership with his former Ceylon and Sinhalese Sports Club teammate Bertie Wijesinha.

== Personal life ==
De Zoysa married his first wife, Jean Rock, a prominent tennis player in Ceylon, in 1940. Their son Michael was a Sri Lankan cricket administrator who managed some Sri Lankan touring teams. Michael died in 2019.

Lucien de Zoysa and Jean were divorced. His second wife was Dr Manorani Saravanamuttu (daughter of Manicasothy Saravanamuttu), a medical doctor and actress who played opposite him in some of his theatrical productions. They had a son, Richard, a journalist and human rights activist, who was murdered in 1990.

Lucien de Zoysa died suddenly at his home in the northern Colombo seaside suburb of Hendala, in June 1995, aged 78. He was survived by his third wife, Evelyn, and their daughter, Lana.

== Books by Lucien de Zoysa ==
- Indian Culture in the Days of the Buddha (history, 1955)
- Fortress in the Sky (play, 1956)
- Princess of the Lonely Days (play, 1957)
- Fire and Storm Wind (play, 1958)
- Put Out the Light (play, 1964)
- Self-Portrait of a King (novel, 1971)
- Stories from the Culavamsa and other historical tales (stories, 1988)
- Stories from the Mahavamsa (stories, 1988)
- First Love (cricket memoir, 1992)
