= 10th Sarasaviya Awards =

1982 awards festival for Sinhala cinema

- Date: May 29, 1982
- Site: Bandaranaike Memorial International Conference Hall, Colombo 07, Sri Lanka
- Directed by: Granville Silva

Highlights
- Best Picture: Sagarayak Meda
- Most awards: Sagarayak Meda (8)
- Most nominations: Sagarayak Meda

Television coverage
- Network: Associated Newspapers of Ceylon Limited

The 10th Sarasaviya Awards festival (Sinhala: 10වැනි සරසවිය සම්මාන උලෙළ), presented by the Associated Newspapers of Ceylon Limited, was held to honor the best films of 1981 Sinhala cinema on May 29, 1982, at the Bandaranaike Memorial International Conference Hall, Colombo 07, Sri Lanka. Minister of Finance and Planning Ronnie de Mel was the chief guest at the awards night.

The film Sagarayak Meda won the most awards with eight including Best Film.

== Awards ==
Category	Film	Recipient
Best Film	Sagarayak Meda	Ananda Abeynayake
Best Director	Sagarayak Meda	Gamini Fonseka
Best Actor	Beddegama	Joe Abeywickrama
Best Actress	Aradhana	Malani Fonseka
Best Supporting Actor	Aradhana	David Dharmakeerthi
Best Supporting Actress	Sagarayak Meda	Iranganie Serasinghe
Best Upcoming Actress		Nadeeka Gunasekara
Best Script Writer	Sagarayak Meda	Dharmasri Munasinghe
Best Cinematographer	Aradhana	Sumitta Amarasinghe
Best Editor	Sagarayak Meda	D. B. Nihalsinghe
Best Art Direction	Sagarayak Meda	Eral Kelly
Best Makeup Artist	Sagarayak Meda	Shesha Palihakkara
Best Sound Effects	Beddegama	Michael Sathyanathan
Best Music Direction	Aradhana	Rohana Weerasinghe; H. M. Jayawardena
Best Lyricist	Aradhana	Kularatne Ariyawansa
Best Male Playback Singer	Aradhana	W. D. Amaradeva
Best Female Playback Singer	Vajira	Nanda Malini
Most Popular Film	People's vote	Sagarayak Meda
Most Popular Actor	People's vote	Gamini Fonseka
Most Popular Actress	People's vote	Malani Fonseka

Category	Film
Popular Awards from Reader Vote
Popular Awards from Reader Vote	Sagarayak Meda
Popular Awards from Reader Vote	Sathweni Dawasa
Popular Awards from Reader Vote	Chanchala Rekha
Popular Awards from Reader Vote	Beddegama
Popular Awards from Reader Vote	Vajira
Popular Awards from Reader Vote	Aradhana
Popular Awards from Reader Vote	RIdee Thella
