= Joe Abeywickrama =

Sri Lankan actor (1927-2011)

Joe Abeywickrama ජෝ අබේවික්‍රම
- Born: Gammana Patabendige Don John Abeywickrama; June 22, 1927; Ratnapura, Sri Lanka
- Died: 21 September 2011 (aged 84)
- Education: Sivali Central College
- Occupation: Actor
- Years active: 1955-2011
- Known for: Crowned king of Sri Lankan cinema
- Notable work: Saraiya in Saravita; Vannihamy in Pura Handa Kaluwara; Silindu in Baddegama

Deshabandu Gammana Patabendige Don John Abeywickrama (Sinhala:ජෝ අබේවික්‍රම) (22 June 1927 – 21 September 2011), popularly known as Joe Abeywickrama, was an actor in Sri Lankan cinema, theater and television.Initially famed as a comedic actor in early 1950s, Abeywickrama became one of the greatest film actors of all time in Sinhala cinema with several critically acclaimed award winning dramatic performances. Some critics and audiences regard him as the finest actor in the local industry, while others argue that distinction belongs to Gamini Fonseka . Among the three “crowned kings” of Sri Lankan cinema, Abeywickrama was the second to die, after Gamini Fonseka. The last to die was Tony Ranasinghe

He won 18 Sarasavi Awards and Presidential Awards. At the 1999 Singapore International Film Festival, Abeywickrama won a Silver Screen Award for Best Asian Actor for his portrayal of a grieving father in Pura Handa Kaluwara (Death on a Full Moon Day), a first for a Sri Lankan.

He was the first Sri Lankan actor to participate in the Filmfare Film Festival, which he attended in 1966.

== Personal life ==
Abeywickrama was born on 22 June 1927 in Lellopitiya, Ratnapura, Sri Lanka (at that time British Ceylon) and grew up in a rural area. He was the eldest of four children, with two sisters, Nanda Abeywickrama and Missie Abeywickrama, and a brother, Allan Abeywickrama. His surroundings instilled in him a strong appreciation of nature and hard work. His father had a close friendship with John D’Oyly, from whom Abeywickrama received his name, “Joe.”

He completed primary education at Dippitigala Mixed School near Lellopitiya. Then he joined Sivali Central College, Ratnapura for his secondary education and then joined St. Aloysius College, Ratnapura for a short period of time.

After completing his education, Abeywickrama worked as the manager of the Lellopitiya Co-operative with the support of his brother Allan Abeywickrama, who himself appeared in two Sinhala films. In the 1940s he settled in Colombo and started working for Sirisena Wimalaweera's studio Nawajeewana.

Joe married Pushpa Kumari Karunarathna, the daughter of a civil engineer and architect. He first met her while living next door to her family’s home. During those days, Joe would often follow her to the temple, hoping for a chance to speak with her. With the help of Gamini Fonseka's wife Tina who discreetly exchanged letters between them, their acquaintance blossomed into a romance. Joe and Pushpa eventually married and remained together until her death in 2007. They had two children: a daughter, Udeni Kumari Abeywickrama, and a son, Channa Abeywickrama.

== Career ==
After settling in Colombo he started working for Sirisena Wimalaweera's studio Nawajeewana. Initially limited to doing office chores, Abeywickrama eventually became involved in films screened in Ratnapura by the studio. He made contacts with film industry insiders while with the studio, and on his leave obtained a role in Devasundari.

Abeywickrama began his acting career in stage plays. In 1955, he made his film acting debut with a comedy role in Devasundari directed by M.H. Munas, a Sri Lankan who made films from India. Abeywickrama's first notable role was in Saradama directed by T. Somasekaran as an eccentric police officer who collected ants. He obtained the role with the help of his friend Florida Jayalath and considers it to be his first real role and a turning point in his career. He was a comedian in all of his early films with some notable roles in the films Sirimalee, Nalangana, Pirimiyek Nisa, Kolamba Sanniya and Daruwa Kageda. Then he was invited to play a major role in the film Ranmuthu Duwa in 1962, where he acted with Gamini Fonseka for the first time. In 1956, he made a role of "comedy detective" in the film Shri 296 directed by Premnath Moraes.

In the preceding years, he appeared in many dramatic roles in several critically acclaimed films such as Deepashika, Soldadu Unnehe, Chandiya, Sweep Ticket, Allapu Gedara, Ektam Ge, and Saravita. In 1965, he won the award for the Best Actor at the Sarasaviya Awards for his role "Sarayya" in the film Saravita. In 1971, he acted in the film Welikathara directed by D. B. Nihalsinghe, where he played the role of "Gorin Mudalali". The film received several awards at local film festivals and considered one of the Ten Best Sri Lankan films of all time. He also starred in Mahagama Sekera's Tun Man Handiya in 1970. His other notable acting came through Getawarayo as "Semaneris", and in Sadol Kandulu as "dumb servant". For his role in the film Sadol Kandulu, he later won the Sarasaviya Award for the Best Actor. He won forty awards including both international and local film festivals.

In the film Beddegama directed by Lester James Peries, he played a critically acclaimed role as "Silindu". In 1982, the character gave him another Sarasviya Award as the Best Actor. His character "Nirudaka" in the film Desa Nisa is also received critics acclaim. He also appeared in two English films titled Peter of the Elephants and The Three Yellow Cats. In 2001, he acted in the film Pura Handa Kaluwara directed by Prasanna Vithanage. The film is considered a hallmark in Sinhala cinema history. He won the Best Actor award at 12th Singapore International Film Festival for his role "Wannihami" in the film. His final film role came through the war drama film Selvam. Until his death, he has acted in 172 films where 62 of them as leading actor and rest 110 as a supporting actor. He was also the first Sri Lankan actor to attend the Filmfare Awards in India.

Apart from cinema, he also appeared in few stage dramas such as: Mal Yahanawa, Beri Sil (1960) and Kele Mal (1962). He also acted in many television serials such as Andu Kola, Vanas Pathi, Gamperaliya, Sakisanda Eliyas and Esala Kaluwara. He also made the script for the popular comedy serial Sabada Pabilis. In the serial, he also wrote the theme song, "Una Puruke Balu Walige" sung by lead actor Anton Jude. Meanwhile, he also sang the song "Wel Eliyata' in the tele drama Thahanchi. one of his television production. In 2004, he wrote the script of television serial Sakisanda Eliyas.

== Author work ==
Abeywickrama published his first novel Maha Bambata Muhunu Dekai in 1972.

== Legacy ==
On 21 September 2020, a special commemorative event was held on the ninth death anniversary of Joe Abeywickrema. It was organized by The National Film Corporation and was held at the NFC Auditorium at 6 pm. After the event, one of his popular film Thun Mang Handiya was screened.

== Filmography ==
Year	Film	Role	Ref.
1957	Saradama	police officer	
1959	Avishwasaya		
1959	Sri 296		
1959	Gehenu Geta		
1959	Sirimalee		
1960	Nalangana		
1960	Pirimiyek Nisa		
1961	Daruwa Kageda		
1962	Ranmuthu Duwa	Sena	
1962	Deva Sundari		
1963	Wena Swargayak Kumatada		
1963	Deepashika		
1964	Hete Pramada Wediyi		
1964	Getawarayo	Semanaris	
1964	Suba Sarana Sepa Sithe		
1964	Sithaka Mahima		
1965	Chandiya	Peda	
1965	Sathutu Kandulu		
1965	Saaravita	Bamunusinha Arachchige Gunahamy 'Saraiya'	
1965	Hithata Hitha		
1965	Allapu Gedara	Kapila	
1965	Satha Panaha		
1965	Sweep Ticket		
1965	Landaka Mahima	Mohan	
1966	Kommissar X – Drei gelbe Katzen	Police constable	
1966	Sengawena Sewanella		
1966	Mahadena Muththa	Polbemuna	
1966	Senasuma Kothenada		
1966	Athulweema Thahanam		
1966	Seegiri Kashyapa	Rala	
1966	Kapatikama		
1966	Parasathu Mal		
1967	Sorungeth Soru		
1967	Manamalayo		
1967	Daru Duka		
1967	Sendol Kandulu		
1968	Punchi Baba	Sena	
1968	Akka Nago		
1968	Amathikama	Mudalali	
1968	Dahasak Sithuvili	Sunny	
1968	Adarawanthayo		
1968	Ataweni Pudumaya		
1969	Senehasa		
1969	Oba Nethinam		
1969	Narilatha	Alpenis	
1969	Hari Maga		
1969	Baduth Ekka Horu		
1969	Uthum Sthree		
1969	Prawesam Wanna		
1969	Para Walalu		
1969	Pancha		
1969	Romeo Juliet Kathawa		
1970	Lakseta Kodiya	Pinsiri	
1970	Thewatha		
1970	Tun Man Handiya	Abilin	
1971	Seeye Nottuwa		
1971	Welikathara	Goring Mudalali	
1971	Haralaksaya		
1972	Chandar, the Black Leopard of Ceylon	Father	
1972	Weeduru Gewal		
1973	Mathara Aachchi		
1973	Thushara		
1973	Sadahatama Oba Mage		
1974	Kalyani Gangaa		
1974	Onna Babo Billo Enawa		
1974	Niyangala Mal		
1975	Raththaran Amma		
1975	Tharanga		
1974	Sooraya Soorayamai	Abeywickrama	
1975	Sikuruliya	Berty	
1975	Sadhana		
1975	Kalu Diya Dahara		
1975	Desa Nisa	Nirudaka	
1976	Wasana		
1976	Madol Duwa	Dharmasinghe gurunnanse	
1976	Kolomba Sanniya	Andare	
1976	The God King	Swami	
1976	Unnatha Dahai Malath Dahai		
1976	Onna Mame Kella Panapi		
1977	Hithuwoth Hithuwamai	Alwis	
1977	Yali Ipade		
1977	Siripala Ha Ranmenika	Simon	
1978	Gehenu Lamai		
1978	Siripathula	Chanting man	
1978	Selinage Walauwa		
1978	Sara	Gajanayake	
1978	Veera Puran Appu	Gongalegoda Banda	
1978	Bambaru Avith	Anton Aiya	
1978	Sally		
1978	Kumara Kumariyo	Dharme	
1978	Sandawata Rantharu		
1979	Jeewana Kandulu	Vimal	
1979	Hingana Kolla	Vayya, Diyathalan Mama	
1979	Raja Kollo		
1979	Wasanthe Dawasak	Samantenne Arachchi	
1979	Visi Hathara Peya	Winson	
1979	Hari Pudumai	Sugath	
1980	Tak Tik Tuk	Detective Serasinghe	
1980	Jodu Walalu	Suminda	
1980	Ektem Ge	Wilson	
1980	Seetha		
1980	Aadara Rathne	Bertholameus	
1980	Siribo Aiya	Siribo Aiya	
1980	Bambara Pahasa	Siripala	
1980	Dandu Monara	Jinapala	
1980	Muwan Pelessa 2		
1980	Para Dige		
1980	Sinhabahu	Sinha	
1981	Kolam Karayo	Saarapala	
1981	Taranga		
1981	Baddegama	Silindu	
1981	Sayuru Thera	Fish salesman	
1981	Soldadu Unnahe	Soldier	
1981	Sathara Pera Nimithi		
1981	Pinhami		
1981	Sathara Diganthaya		
1982	Thana Giravai	Doctor Siri	
1982	Wathura Karaththaya	Shooter	
1982	Major Sir		
1982	Kele Mal	Daasa	
1982	Malata Noena Bambaru	Sunny	
1982	Rail Paara	Rail Guard	
1982	Kadaunu Poronduwa	Hemapala	
1983	Ran Mini Muthu		
1983	Sandamali		
1983	Sumithuro		
1983	Niliyakata Pem Kalemi		
1983	Samuganimi Ma Samiyani		
1983	Suboda		
1983	Muwan Pelessa 3		
1983	Monara Thenna 2		
1983	Peter of the Elephants		
1983	Muhudu Lihini		
1984	Shirani		
1984	Thaththai Duwai	Lavuris	
1984	Podi Ralahami	Podi Ralahami	
1984	Sasara Chethana		
1984	Wadula		
1984	Hima Kathara		
1984	Sahodariyakage Kathawa		
1985	Suddilage Kathaawa	Ex-Village Headman	
1986	Maldeniye Simion	Simion	
1986	Dev Duwa	Mohomed	
1986	Pooja	Jamis (the executioner)	
1986	Aadara Hasuna	Army officer (Colonel)	
1987	Viragaya	Jayasena, Aravinda's father	
1988	Rasa Rahasak	Hitler Abeynayake	
1988	Angulimala	Disapamok	
1990	Palama Yata	Uncle	
1991	Golu Muhude Kunatuwak	Podi Mahaththaya	
1991	Cheriyo Doctor	Chief psychiatrist	
1991	Sthree	Appuhamy	
1992	Umayanganaya	The eldest brother	
1994	Ambu Samiyo	Doctor	
1995	Awaragira	K.B. Sethigala	
1995	Cheriyo Captain	Captain Doson	
1996	Hitha Honda Gahaniyek		
1996	Loku Duwa	Mr. Palihawadana	
1996	Cheriyo Darling	Chief psychiatrist	
1996	Bithu Sithuwam	Senaka	
1997	Suddu Akka	Blacksmith	
1998	Vimukthi		
1999	Theertha Yathra	Father	
2000	Saroja	Indigenous doctor	
2000	Rajya Sevaya Pinisai	Sumanasekara	
2001	Purahanda Kaluwara	Vannihamy	
2001	Aswesuma	Guneris – old age	
2006	Dheewari	Mudalali	
2009	Alimankada		
2010	Tikiri Suwanda	Devendra	
2011	Mahindagamanaya	Mantha	
2011	Selvam	Sathyavelu	
2012	Prathiroo	Siyathu	
2013	Abhinikmana	Buddhadasa's Father	

== Awards ==
=== Sarasaviya Film Award ===
Year	Nominee / work	Award	Result
1965	Getawarayo	Merit Award	Won
1966	Saaravita	Best Actor	Won
1982	Beddegama	Best Actor	Won
1983	Malata Noena Bambaru	Best Actor	Won
1986	Contribution to cinema	Rana Thisara Award	Won
1987	Maldeniye Simieon	Best Actor	Won
1991	Palama Yata	Best Supporting Actor	Won
1992	Golu Muhude Kunatuwak	Best Actor	Won
1993	Umayangana	Best Actor	Won
1997	Bithu Sithuwam	Best Actor	Won
1998	Bithu Sithuvam	Best Actor	Won
2001	Purahanda Kaluwara	Best Actor	Won

=== Presidential Film Awards ===
Year	Nominee / work	Award	Result
1979	Bambaru Evith	Merit Award	Won
1980	Wasanthaye Dawasak	Best Supporting Actor	Won
1981	Siribo Ayya	Best Actor	Won
1982	Beddegama	Best Actor	Won
1983	Malata Noena Bambaru	Best Actor	Won

=== Singapore International Film Festival ===
Year	Nominee / work	Award	Result
1999	Pura Handa Kaluwara	Silver Screen Award for Best Actor	Won

=== Presidential Film Awards ===
Year	Nominee / work	Award	Result
1999	Contribution to Drama	U.W. Sumathipala Lifetime	
2000	Imadiya Mankada	Best Teledrama Actor	Won

=== Sri Lankan National Honours ===
Year	Nominee / work	Award	Result
2005	Contribution to Drama	Deshabandu	Won
