= Buddhi Wickrama =

Sri Lankan actor and dramatist (1939–2023)

- බුද්ධි වික්‍රම
- Born: Buddhisena Dayaratne Wickrama; 19 January 1939; Galle, British Ceylon
- Died: 5 January 2023 (aged 83); Homagama, Sri Lanka
- Education: Heenatigala Sariputhra College; Mahinda College
- Occupation: Actor
- Years active: 1962–2016
- Spouse: Irangani Wannakukorala (m. 1975)

Buddhisena Dayaratne Wickrama (19 January 1939 – 5 January 2023), popularly known as Buddhi Wickrama, was a Sri Lankan actor in cinema, theatre, and television. He is most notable for the roles played in the television dramas Tharadevi, Suseema, Boomarangaya, and Amba Yahaluvo.

== Biography ==
Wickrama was born in Heenatigala, Galle, British Ceylon on 19 January 1939, as the second child of the family. His father worked in the Department of Posts, and he had one elder brother and two younger sisters. He completed his primary education from Heenatigala Sariputhra College and his secondary education from Mahinda College.

While in school, he performed in the stage play Avurudda produced by Vinnie Vitharana. After that, he worked in the Department of Surveys in 1959 as a designer, where he met fellow actors Dhamma Jagoda, Santin Gunawardena, Shelton de Silva, and Mervyn Jayathunga. During this period, Buddhi joined the "Kala Pela" drama troupe founded by G. D. L. Perera. In 1962, he made his first theatre appearance in Perera's play Magul Mathe. Other stage plays he performed in include Andare, Parasthawa, Kāmarē Porē, Janēlaya, Thotupala, Mehew Lokayak, Kontharē, Manaranjana Weda Warjana, Hotabari Yuddē, Apāyē Avurudu, and Sri Wickrama. After leaving the Survey Department, Buddhi joined the Ceramics Corporation. His last stage performance was R. R. Samarakoon's Doovili.

In 1964, he made his first cinema appearance in the film Saama, directed by Perera. In 1967, he acted in the film Sadol Kandulu. He also appeared in foreign films and serials such as The Village by the Sea, Good Marriages, The Greatest Gift, and Water. He portrayed a friend of Gorin Mudalali in the film Welikathara, and as a robber in the film Haralakshaya.

In 1975, Wickrama married Irangani Wannakukorala and the couple had one daughter. They met while both were working at the Ceramics Corporation.

His first television appearance came through the 1987 serial Eka Mawakage Daruwo directed by Lucien Bulathsinhala. He then appeared in more than 40 television serials over two decades, including Kumarihami, Palingu Menike, Thara Devi, Doo Daruwo, Amba Yahaluvo, Gam Peraliya, Suseema, and Bawa Tharana as his final television appearance in 2012. Among them is the role he played as Punsiri's father in the teledrama Du Daruwo and the role 'Kendalanda' in the popular teen serial Amba Yahaluvo, which received critical acclaim.

In 2014, he underwent bypass heart surgery and retired from acting. Wickrama later began using a wheelchair. He later became bedridden after suffering a dislocated hip. In 2017, he was diagnosed with Parkinson's disease. Wickrama died on 5 January 2023, at the age of 83. He was undergoing treatment at the General Hospital in Homagama at the time of his death.

== Selected television serials ==
- Thara Devi
- Amba Yahaluvo
- Bawa Tharana
- Doo Daruwo
- Charitha Thunak
- Gamanaanthaya
- Gam Peraliya
- Hiruta Muwawen
- Kadathurawa
- Kalu Makara
- Kumarihami
- Palingu Menike
- Pitagankarayo
- Punchi Hapannu
- Sandagalathanna
- Sihina Nimnaya
- Sihinayak Addara
- Sonduru Sithaththi
- Suseema

== Filmography ==
Year	Film	Role	Ref.
1965	Saama		
1967	Sadol Kandulu		
1968	Dahasak Sithuvili	Lalith's co-worker	
1969	Romeo Juliet Kathawak		
1971	Welikathara	Goring's associate	
1971	Haara Lakshaya	1st beating victim	
1974	The Greatest Gift		
1975	Tharanga	Buddhi	
1988	Amme Oba Nisa		
1990	Vana Bambara		
1994	Des Héros Ordinaires		
1996	Amanthaya		
1997	Tharanaya		
1997	Les mystères de Sadjurah		
1998	Dehena		
1998	Anthima Reya		
2000	Chakrayudha		
2000	Rajya Sevaya Pinisai	Car robbery victim	
2000	Un dono semplice		
2003	Sudu Kaluwara	Registrar	
2005	Water	Baba	
2015	Lantin Singho		
