= G. D. L. Perera =

Sri Lankan actor and filmmaker (1935–2021)

G. D. L. Perera ජී. ඩී. එල්. පෙරේරා
- Born: Gonaduwahandunge Don Lakshman Perera; 26 June 1935; Ratnapura, British Ceylon
- Died: 14 February 2021 (aged 85); London, England
- Other name: GDL
- Education: St. Benedict's College, Colombo; Prince College, Kotahena; Nalanda College, Colombo
- Occupations: Filmmaker, actor, dramatist, journalist
- Years active: 1953–2003

Gonaduwahandunge Don Lakshman Perera (26 June 1935 – 14 February 2021 as Sinhala: ජී. ඩී. එල්. පෙරේරා), popularly known as G. D. L. Perera, was an actor and filmmaker in Sri Lankan cinema as well as a journalist.

== Early life ==
He was born on 26 June 1935 in Thiruvanaketiya, Ratnapura, Sri Lanka. He received his primary education at a mixed school in Thiruvanaketiya. Since childhood, he suffered from asthma. His parents chose to relocate him to Colombo because of its moderate climate rather than a colder village. Then he entered St. Benedict's College, Colombo for his secondary education and later entered Prince College, Kotahena. He passed the GCE Ordinary Level Examination with good distinctions. He completed his secondary education from Nalanda College, Colombo. Later, he was admitted to the Technical College in Maradana by his parents.

In 1954 he joined the government clerical profession and formed the Zonal Cultural Association with his office colleagues. In 1962, he worked in the Department of Labor. His elder brother was a regional politician. His mother died in 1960.

== Career ==
During his life in Prince College, Kotahena, he met the teacher Edwin Hewa Kapuge who turned GDL's future towards drama. In 1953, still as a student, he produced a short play titled Okkoma Pisso which was performed under the 'Kumara Ranga', the college's year-end concert. Then he produced two more plays: Aes Læbīma and Kambā Horu. During his life at the technical college, he met Walter Wimalaratne, where GDL polished his artistic abilities. While they went to watch a theatre play, he met the dramatist Thotalaga Tungasena Master. His drama career began as a stage drama producer. When the playwright Sugathapala de Silva maintained Ape Kattiya drama circle, GDL also created a collection of contemporary playwrights for his artwork called 'Kalapela' on 29 September 1955. Its founding members were Amitha Mallawarachchi, Karunaratne D. Philip, S. Karunaratne, Victor Wickramage.

Meanwhile, he wrote a script for the play titled Kandulu. The play became his turning point of the drama career which made its premiere on 9 November 1955. Then the play was staged in 1958 at the Borella Young Buddhist Society Hall. After the success in the play, he made his second play Manamalakama. The play had background vocals like in the movies where the lyrics were imitations of Hindi film songs. In 1962, he produced the play Sāmā and introduced Denawaka Hamine to the stream. Due to its high popularity, the play was chosen to stage the first play to open the Royal Theater. During this time an institution called the National Drama Arts Corporation was established and held a drama festival. GDL's play was also staged at the festival with critics acclaim. Later he has made several stage dramas such as Sakkara Vaṭṭam (1961), Mehev Lōkeka (1962), Hevanæli, Ihaṭa Vahala Nil Ahasayi, Sansāra Gamanak, Magul Mathē and Rathurōsa (1962).

The play Mehew Lokeka competed at the state drama festival where the lead actress Leoni Kotelawala won Best Actress Award for her performance. In 1964, GDL produced the play Thoṭupaḷa. It is considered to be the first stage play to discuss the ethnic issue in the country. The play won the award for the Best Play at the 1964 National Drama Festival and was re-produced in 2008. After a tragic drama, GDL produced a simple humorous stage play Andare in 1965. Sugathapala Senarath Yapa played the role of 'Andare' in the play. Along with the play Andare, the short play Magul Mathe has also been staged. He also wrote short plays: 'Magul Mathe', 'Gete', 'Kamba Horu' and 'Kekille'.

During this period, Sugathapala Senarath Yapa proposed that the production of the play Sama should be made into a film. In 1962, GDL prepared the script of the play Sama as a screenplay. Then Kala Pela stage plays were staged in all parts of the country to raise funds for the film. Finally, he directed the film Sama and made its premiere at the New Olympia Cinema Hall, Maradana on 15 June 1965. It is the first co-operative film produced in Sri Lanka as well as the first time that a Sinhala film was shown in an air-conditioned cinema hall. Due to economic difficulties, GDL was able to get only three copies of the film Sama where they were screened at Lasa in Kandy, Odeon in Galle, New Olympia in Colombo and Odeon in Mount Lavinia. The film won the Special Jury Prize at the 1966 Sarasaviya Film Awards for the best cinematic creation. In the same year, the film entered competition section of the Commonwealth Film Festival in England. The film was also screened at the Cine-Stud Amsterdam (Student Film Festival), as well as in London, Lancaster, Italy, Germany and France.

After making the blockbuster film Sama, he co-directed the film Sadol Kandulu in 1966 with Regie Perera. Actresses Malini Fonseka and Chandra Kaluarachchi started their film careers along with GDL's film Dahasak Sithuvili in 1968. In late 1968, he started short courses in film technology and taught cinema to young people. GDL won Best Director at the 1969 6th Sarasaviya Awards for the film Dahasak Sithuvili. In addition, the Sri Lanka Critics and Writers' Association presented four awards for the film: Best Screenplay, Best Cinematography (for D. B. Nihalsinghe), Best Script and Best Character (for Henry Jayasena). In the meantime, the film was also represented at the Berlin Film Festival in Germany, the Locarno Film Festival in Italy, and the New Delhi Film Festival in India. In 1970, he directed the political themed film Romeo Juliet Kathawak, although the film was a commercial failure as well as received negative reviews from critics.

In 1969 he went to London after he was awarded a scholarship by the British Council to study cinema. While in London, he directed a film called Igilena Kurullo, but it stopped halfway. Then he made a film called Dura Giya Gamanak but the National Film Corporation refused to pay for it. After that, GDL made the English film Peter of The Elephants. It was a Sri Lankan film that was commercially screened in many countries around the world except Sri Lanka. He also directed the popular films Hora Police (1994), Igilena Kurullo (1970) and Dura Giya Gamanak. Apart from Sinhala films, he also made several English films. In 1972, he had his only child. In 1982, he created his first teledrama in London, Rata Giya Aththo. At the same time, he made the first tele film in Sri Lanka called Winners and Losers in 1986. The serial Magul Mathe is said to be an adaptation of an English play which was the first drama to be telecast in Sri Lanka.

In 1996, GDL was involved in and contributed news and features to the Sinhala service of BBC Sinhala 'Sandesaya' radio program for over a decade. He was in charge of coordinating the audience response to the BBC Sinhala service, pioneered the compilation of 'Thepel Malla', which were published every Friday, reviewing listeners' comments. He initially worked with the BBC Sinhala Service in London but later joined Elmo Fernando, then a BBC Colombo correspondent, to coordinate the listeners' message from Sri Lanka. He was also in charge of compiling the historical document based on BBC Sinhala service rendered since World War II and transcribing for a series of programs. In 1999, he retired from the BBC permanently.

During his tenure in BBC, GDL made the telefilm Passage to England for O'Keefe company. His last film was made under the name Hora Police, but it was screened under the name Chakrayudha in 1999. In his later life, he contributed with many drama programs for youth in Kundasale, Kandy after he bought a four acre piece of land in Karalliyadda in Kandy and established two buildings. Then he produced a play called Surasura by the 'Kalagaraya' Cultural Center established in Kandy. In 2007, he was honored with the lifetime Rana Thisara Award in recognition of his film career at the 31st Sarasaviya Awards. He introduced many actors, actresses and composers to the Sinhala film: Buddhi Wickrama, Leoni Kotelawala, Dhamma Wanniarachchi, Sugathapala Senarath Yapa, Elson Divithuragama, Denawaka Hamine, Gamini Wickramasooriya, Nilanthi Wijesinghe, Jayatissa Alahakoon, Mallika Perera and Devananda Vaidyasekara are some of them.

He died on 14 February 2021 in London at the age of 85.

== Filmography ==
Year	Film	Roles	Ref.
1948	Weradunu Kurumanama	uncredited role	
1965	Sama	Director, screenwriter	
1967	Sadol Kandulu	Co-director, Assistant Film Editor	
1968	Dahasak Sithuvili	Director, screenwriter	
1969	Romeo Juliet Kathawak	Director, screenwriter	
1983	Peter of the Elephants	Director, producer	
2000	Chakrayudha	Director, producer, screenwriter, Film Editor, lyricist	
