= 2nd Sarasaviya Awards =

1965 awards festival for Sinhala cinema

- Date: July 1, 1965
- Site: Asoka Cinema, Colombo, Sri Lanka
- Directed by: Granville Silva

Highlights
- Best Picture: Getawarayo
- Most awards: Getawarayo (8)
- Most nominations: Getawarayo

Television coverage
- Network: Associated Newspapers of Ceylon Limited

The 2nd Sarasaviya Awards festival (Sinhala: 2වැනි සරසවිය සම්මාන උලෙළ), presented by the Associated Newspapers of Ceylon Limited, was held to honor the best films of 1964 in Sinhala cinema on July 1, 1965, at the Asoka Cinema, Colombo, Sri Lanka. Governor William Gopallawa was the chief guest at the awards night.

It is noteworthy that this year's awards will be replaced by special merit awards and no awards will be given in the categories of screenwriting, editing, music direction and art direction. The film Getawarayo won the most awards with eight including Best Film.

== Awards ==
Category	Film	Recipient
Best Film	Getawarayo	Shesha Palihakkara
Best Director	Getawarayo	Mike Wilson; Tissa Liyanasuriya
Best Actor	Dheewarayo	Gamini Fonseka
Best Actress	Getawarayo	Sobani Amarasinghe
Best Cinematographer	Getawarayo	W. A. Rathnayake
Best Lyricist	Getawarayo	Madawala S. Rathnayake
Best Male Playback Singer	Getawarayo	W. D. Amaradeva
Best Female Playback Singer	Getawarayo	Latha Walpola
Special Merit Gifts	Dheewarayo	Sandhya Kumari
Special Merit Gifts	Getawarayo	Joe Abeywickrama
Special Merit Gifts	Sithaka Mahima	Rita Ratnayake
Special Merit Gifts	Dheewarayo	Ruby de Mel
Special Merit Gifts	Sasaraka Hati	Jeevarani Kurukulasuriya
Special Merit Gifts	Sasaraka Hati	Anthony C. Perera
Special Merit Gifts	Chandali	S. D. S. Somaratne

Category	Film	No. of votes
Popular Awards from Reader Vote	Getawarayo	25,572 votes
Popular Awards from Reader Vote	Chandali	12,246 votes
Popular Awards from Reader Vote	Dheewarayo	11,621 votes
Popular Awards from Reader Vote	Sithaka Mahima	8,240 votes
Popular Awards from Reader Vote	Sasaraka Hati	6,374 votes
Popular Awards from Reader Vote	Patachara	2,996 votes
Popular Awards from Reader Vote	Samiya Birindage Deviyaya	2,412 votes
