= Sanoja Bibile =

Sri Lankan actress and comedian

- සනෝජා බිබිලේ
- Born: Thiromi Sanoja Bibile; 27 December 1967 (age 58); Kandy, Sri Lanka
- Education: Girls' High School, Kandy
- Occupation: Actress
- Years active: 1988–present
- Spouse: Hiran Thenuwara

Thiromi Sanoja Bibile (born December 27, 1967, Sinhala: සනෝජා බිබිලේ), is an actress in Sri Lankan cinema and television. She started her career with dramatic roles and moved to comedy roles. Sanoja is well known for the roles Mali Nandani in the TV series Nonavaruni Mahathvaruni and Miss Kitty in the 1996 movie Cheriyo Darling. She is a successful netball player.

She is the 1st runner up in Miss Working Girl 1996 pageant and became 4th runner up in Miss Asia 1993 pageant.

== Personal life ==
His father Sumith Bibile was an actor appeared in films such as Umathu Wishwasaya and Asoka. Sumith was born on 30 November 1930 in Kandy and died on 5 September 2017. He was educated in Dharmaraja College. Her mother was Nandanie Dehigama. Sanoja completed her education from Girls' High School, Kandy. She is a successful netball player.

On 4 November 2019, she met with an accident at 8. 45 am on Deans Road, Maradana and was hospitalized with minor injuries.

She works at Mahaweli Authority.

== Career ==
She started cinema career with the 1987 film Mangala Thegga directed by H.D. Premaratne. Her notable cinema came through Awaragira, Cheriyo Darling, Ra Daniel Dawal Migel 3 and Supiri Andare. In 2000, she entered film production with the film Alu Yata Gini.

She acted in the new music video Ashokamala sung by Sunil Malawana.

=== Selected television serials ===
- Aswenna
- Charitha Dekak
- Class Sinhala Class
- Dangamalla
- Dedunu Sihina
- Deweni Gamana
- Ganga Addara Kele
- Hapanaa
- Indrachapa
- Nonavaruni Mahathvaruni
- Oba Mageya
- Raja Bhavana
- Shaun
- Sihinayak Paata Paatin * Sivu Diyadahara

== Controversy ==
In 2012, the husband of the Chief Medical Officer (CMO) of the Kataragama hospital allegedly threatened Bibile with a sword after a heated argument had erupted between the two during Bibile went to the hospital to obtain treatment for an urgent illness. With the incident, chief medical officer has been transferred to the Middeniya Rural Hospital with immediate effect.

On 29 November 2015, while attending to pay her last respects to actress Damitha Saluwadana in Boralesgamuwa, Bibile's glass shutters of the car has been broken and stolen Rs. 32,000 in cash, a mobile phone worth Rs. 30,000 and jewelry worth Rs. 3.5 million. She immediately complaint about the burglary and Piliyandala police started the investigations.

== Filmography ==
Key
†	Denotes films that have not yet been released

Year	Film	Role	Ref.
1988	Mangala Thegga	Prostitute Susie	
1989	Sebaliyo		
1990	Saharawe Sihinaya		
1990	Awaragira	Vineetha Jayasundara	
1990	Jaya Kothanada		
1991	Hithata Dukak Nathi Miniha		
1992	Sinhayangeth Sinhaya	Shiroma	
1993	Mawila Penewi Rupe	John's mother	
1993	Soorayan Athara Veeraya	Thilaka	
1993	Chaya Maya		
1995	Chandi Kello		
1995	Demodara Palama		
1995	Sudu Walassu		
1996	Bawa Sasara		
1996	Hitha Hondanam Waradin Na		
1996	Cheriyo Darling	Miss Kitty	
1996	Madhuri	Miss	
1997	Sudu Akka		
1997	Yasoma		
1997	Vijayagrahanaya		
1997	Savithrige Rathriya		
1998	Sura Yahana Gini Gani		
1999	Akunu Pahara		
2000	Alu Yata Gini	Chathurika	
2000	Pem Kekula		
2001	Kinihiriya Mal	Princy	
2001	Sellam Kukka		
2002	Parliament Jokes	Pushapakumara's wife	
2003	Hitha Honda Pisso	Nirupa / Niru	
2003	Wedaduru Paradeesaya		
2004	Ra Daniel Dawal Migel 3	Moreen	
2004	Left Right Sir	Mary	
2005	Water	Woman Bather	
2005	Sulanga		
2007	First Love Pooja		
2008	Ai Oba Thaniwela		
2010	Subha		
2013	Seetha Man Awa	Film directress	
2014	Supiri Andare	Juhi Chawla	
2014	Rassa Kale	Queen of dwarfs	
2014	Api Marenne Na	Ginige's wife	
2015	Lantin Singho	Pilomina	
TBA	Suragana †		
TBA	Hello Mister – Mama Director †		
TBA	Adarei Jaanu †		
TBA	Madhura Katu †		
