= Yahaluvo =

- Directed by: Sumitra Peries
- Written by: Fahima Sahabdeen
- Produced by: Dr. Namal Senasinghe
- Starring: Pooja Umashankar; Sujeewa Senasinghe; Iranganie Serasinghe; Tony Ranasinghe
- Edited by: Ravindra Guruge
- Production company: CEL circuit cinemas
- Release date: 11 June 2007
- Running time: 98 min
- Language: Sinhala

Yahaluvo (Friends) (යහළුවෝ), also known as Yahaluwo, is a 2007 Sinhala romantic drama film. It was directed by Sumitra Peries, produced by Namal Senasinghe, the brother of Sujeewa Senasinghe, and scored by Navaratne Gamage. The film stars Sujeewa Senasinghe and Pooja Umashankar in lead roles along with Iranganie Serasinghe, Tony Ranasinghe, Kamal Addararachchi, and Anarkali Akarsha in supportive roles. It is the 1097th Sri Lankan film in the Sinhala cinema.

It was released in December 2007, and was a commercial failure despite positive reviews. The film represented Sri Lanka at the 39th International Film Festival of India in Goa in 2008.

== Cast ==
- Sujeewa Senasinghe as Asoka
- Pooja Umashankar as Manorani
- Himasal Thathsara Liyanage
- Iranganie Serasinghe - as Grandmother
- Tony Ranasinghe as Sinhala tuition master
- Kamal Addararachchi as Gate Keeper
- Anarkali Akarsha
- Raja Ganeshan as Gardener
- Gangu Roshana as Housekeeper
- Thesara Jayawardane as Meera
- Vasanthi Chathurani as Burgher music teacher
- Rathna Sumanapala

== Soundtrack ==
No.	Title	Lyrics	Singer(s)	Length
1.	"Ranwan Muwek Eda"	Nilar N. Kazim	Vasanthi Chathurani
2.	"Pulun Wala Rodak"	Wasantha Kumara Kobawaka	Kasun Kalhara, Indika Upamali
3.	"Ira Handa Pamula Ganga"	Rathna Sri Wijesinghe	W.D. Amaradeva
4.	"Ane Anichchan"	Nilar N. Kazim	Hemantha Ranasinghe, Navaratne Gamage, Lakmini Udawatte, Kalawathi, Suriya Kumar Muttalage
