= 6th Sarasaviya Awards =

1969 awards festival for Sinhala cinema

- Date: March 26, 1969
- Site: Women's school premises, Colombo, Sri Lanka
- Directed by: Granville Silva

Highlights
- Best Picture: Golu Hadawatha
- Most awards: Golu Hadawatha (4)
- Most nominations: Golu Hadawatha

Television coverage
- Network: Associated Newspapers of Ceylon Limited

The 6th Sarasaviya Awards festival (Sinhala: 6වැනි සරසවිය සම්මාන උලෙළ), presented by the Associated Newspapers of Ceylon Limited, was held to honor the best films of 1968 Sinhala cinema on March 26, 1969, at the Women's school premises, Colombo, Sri Lanka. Governor William Gopallawa was the chief guest at the awards night.

The film Golu Hadawatha won the most awards with four including Best Film.

== Awards ==
Category	Film	Recipient
Best Film	Golu Hadawatha	Ceylon Studio
Best Director	Dahasak Sithuvili	G. D. L. Perera
Best Actor	Bicycle Hora	D. R. Nanayakkara
Best Actress	Golu Hadawatha	Anula Karunathilaka
Best Supporting Actor	Indunila	Asoka Ponnamperuma
Best Supporting Actress	Bicycle Hora	Jessica Wickrmasinghe
Best Script Writer	Vanasara	S. A. Somaratne
Best Cinematographer	Vanasara	Noel Perera
Best Editor	Dahasak Sithuvili	S. M. Nissar
Best Sound Effects	Indunila	Nimal Weerakkody; C. Somasekaran
Best Music Direction	Golu Hadawatha	Premasiri Khemadasa
Best Lyricist	Singithi Surathal	Karunaratne Abeysekera
Best Male Playback Singer	Aadarawanthayo	Victor Rathnayake
Best Female Playback Singer	Aadarawanthayo	Nanda Malini
Most Popular Actor	People's vote	Gamini Fonseka
Most Popular Actress	People's vote	Anula Karunathilaka
Merit Awards	Abuddassa Kale	Rukmani Devi
Merit Awards	Punchi Baba	Dommie Jayawardena
Merit Awards	Golu Hadawatha	Wijeratne Warakagoda
Merit Awards	Vahal Dupatha	Chandrakala
Merit Awards	Dahasak Sithuvili	G. D. L. Perera

Category	Film
Popular Awards from Reader Vote
Popular Awards from Reader Vote	Dahasak Sithuvili
Popular Awards from Reader Vote	Bicycle Hora
Popular Awards from Reader Vote	Golu Hadawatha
Popular Awards from Reader Vote	Indunila
Popular Awards from Reader Vote	Vanasara
