= Kalu Hima =

- Sinhala: කළු හිම
- Directed by: Upali Gamlath
- Written by: Upali Gamlath
- Produced by: Sinelka Films
- Starring: Niroshan Wijesinghe; Subuddi Lakmali; Gayani Gisanthika
- Cinematography: Poorna Jayasri
- Edited by: Pravin Jayaratne
- Music by: Rohana Weerasinghe
- Distributed by: LFD Theaters
- Release date: 23 August 2018
- Country: Sri Lanka
- Languages: Sinhala; Hindi

Kalu Hima (Sinhala: කළු හිම, lit. 'Black Snow') is a 2018 Sri Lankan Sinhala/Hindi bilingual drama thriller film directed by Upali Gamlath and produced by Wajira Rajapakse for Sinelka Films. It stars Niroshan Wijesinghe and Subuddi Lakmali in lead roles along with Gayani Gisanthika and Iranganie Serasinghe. Music composed by veteran musician Rohana Weerasinghe. The film was shot completely in Nepal. It is the 1311th Sri Lankan film in the Sinhala cinema.

== Plot ==
Sachin, Thivanka, Vinu, and Suren are four Lankan friends who go hiking in the mountain range in Nepal. Sachin is Vinu's boyfriend but on the journey Thivanka also catches Vinu's attention by being helpful. In their journey, they meet with a sudden landslide and Sachin falls from a cliff. Others consider that Sachin died and they go to Sri Lanka again. 3 years later, Sachin is shown to be alive and captive in a guerilla camp. A Lankan lady who works in the camp talks with Sachin. Sachin relates his story to her. The story is a flashback showing how Sachin develops a relationship with a Hindu girl called Chunda who saved his life. One day they run away from Chunda's home as her brother and father protest against their relationship. They go to a house of Chunda's grandmother. One day Sachin goes to the town while Chunda's grandmother's house is destroyed by a flood.

Then after relating the story, the lady helps Sachin to escape from the camp and eventually Sachin comes to a village where he finds Chunda and his child who is also called Sachin. Then he decides to return to Lanka as he realizes that the guerilla troops are searching for him. When he comes to Vinu's house he finds out that she has married Thivanka and she also has a daughter. The story ends as Sachin leaves Vinu's house.

== Cast ==
- Niroshan Wijesinghe as Sachin
- Subuddi Lakmali as Chunda
- Suleka Jayawardana as Vinu
- Kavinga Perera as Thivanka
- Tiran Wickramasuriya as Suren
- Gayani Gisanthika as Lankan lady
- Iranganie Serasinghe as Chunda's granny
- Harry Wimalasena as Chunda's father
- Damayanthi Fonseka
