= The Village in the Jungle =

1913 novel by Leonard Woolf

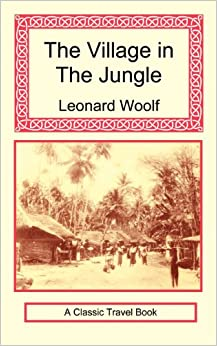
- The village in the jungle by Leonard Woolf
- Author: Leonard Woolf
- Publisher: Edward Arnold
- Publication date: 1913

The Village in the Jungle is a novel by Leonard Woolf, published in 1913, based on his experiences as a colonial civil servant in British-controlled Ceylon (now Sri Lanka) in the early years of the 20th century. Ground-breaking in Western fiction for being written from the native rather than the colonial point of view, it is also an influential work of Sri Lankan literature. It was republished by Eland in 2008.

== Background ==
Leonard Woolf worked for the British Ceylon Civil Service in Sri Lanka for seven years after graduating from Cambridge University in 1904. In Cambridge Woolf had met and befriended members of the Bloomsbury Group. He became Assistant Government Agent in Hambantota District, dealing with a variety of administrative and judicial issues. The district he was in charge of had a population of 100,000 people. Books he took with him to Sri Lanka included the complete works of Voltaire. Woolf also kept a comprehensive diary while there, and later said that his experiences in the country led to him adopting liberal political views and becoming an opponent of imperialism. He wrote The Village in the Jungle, his first novel, after he returned from Sri Lanka to England in 1911 while he was courting his future wife Virginia Stephen. He dedicated the novel to her.

== Plot ==
The novel describes the lives of a poor family in a small village called Beddegama (literally, "The village in the jungle") as they struggle to survive the challenges presented by poverty, disease, superstition, the unsympathetic colonial system, and the jungle itself. The head of the family is a farmer named Silindu, who has two daughters called "Punchi Menika" and "Hinni hami". After being manipulated by the village authorities and a debt collector, Silindu is put on trial for murder.

== Reception and influence ==
Written two decades before George Orwell's much better known anti-imperialist novel Burmese Days, The Village in the Jungle has been described by Nick Rankin as "the first novel in English literature to be written from the indigenous point of view rather than the coloniser's." Victoria Glendinning described it as "a foundational novel in the Sri Lankan literary canon", but the novel remains little known in the wider world. In 1980 a Sinhalese language film entitled Beddegama was released based on the novel.
