= Ammawarune =

- Sinhala: අම්මාවරුනේ
- Directed by: Dr. Lester James Peries
- Written by: Somaweera Senanayake
- Produced by: Silumina Films
- Starring: Malini Fonseka; Pradeep Dharmadasa; Roshan Pilapitiya
- Cinematography: K. A. Dharmasena
- Edited by: Ravindra Guruge
- Music by: Premasiri Khemadasa
- Release date: 30 December 2006
- Country: Sri Lanka
- Language: Sinhala

Ammawarune (Sinhala: අම්මාවරුනේ) is a 2006 Sri Lankan Sinhala drama film directed by Dr. Lester James Peries and produced by Jagath Wijenayake for Silumina Films. It stars Malini Fonseka, and Pradeep Dharmadasa in lead roles along with Roshan Pilapitiya and Sanath Gunathilake. Music composed by veteran musician Premasiri Khemadasa. It is the last film directed by Lester James Pieris as well. The film screened in many countries such as Australia and New Zealand on a special request.

== Plot ==
Sumanawathie's elder son is a Buddhist monk. Her daughter has run from home and married a man who ignores and quarrels with the daughter. Sumanawathie's younger son Saliya gets a job as a soldier. Sumanawathi gets upset as she is left alone in her house. As the film progresses she gets to know that her son has disappeared during a war operation. Her health declines rapidly. After a long time, Saliya comes again to her home alive. Meanwhile her elder son is killed by terrorists when he travels with a team to distribute goods to the poor people.

== Cast ==
- Malini Fonseka as Sumanawathie
- Pradeep Dharmadasa as Kashyapa Hamuduruvo
- Roshan Pilapitiya as Saliya
- Gayani Gisanthika as Premalatha
- Asoka de Zoysa as Ranbanda
- Tissa Abeysekara as Ven. Rathanapala Thero
- Sanath Gunathilake as Doctor
- Douglas Ranasinghe as Divisional Secretary
- Manjula Kumari as Sunanda
- Daya Thennakoon as Appuhamy
- Sarath Kothalawala as Rogus
- Thesara Jayawardane as Doctor's wife
- Palitha Silva as AGA officer
