= Thesara Jayawardane =

Sri Lankan actress, dancer and media personality

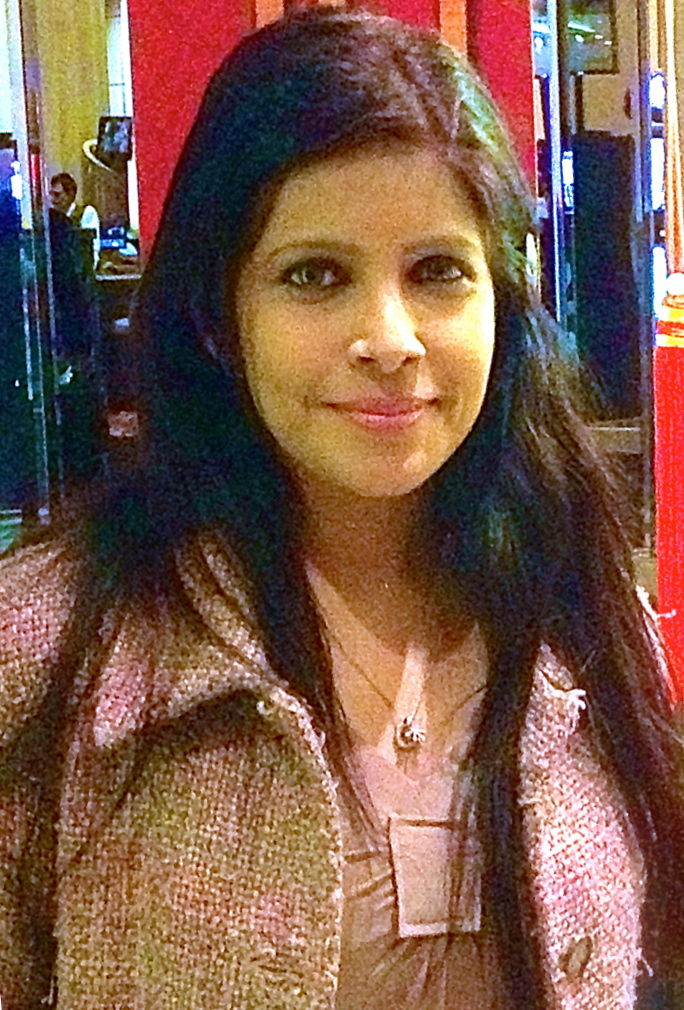
- Thesara Jayawardane
- Education: Phd, MPhil, Bsc(Eng.) NZ, LLB(Hons) (London), MA (Kelaniya), MCIM (UK), MSLIM (SL), AMA (USA), AMIE (SL), Dip.M (UK), Chartered Marketer (UK), Attorney-at-law(SL), Notary Public (SL), Commissioner for Oaths (SL), company secretary (SL)
- Occupations: Engineer, Actress, Author
- Known for: Film and teledrama actress, Singer, Dancer, TV Presenter, author, Lecturer and Senior Lecturer UOM
- Children: Jehara, Satara
- Parent(s): Amara; Jayanthi
- Website: FaceBook Page

Thesara Jayawardane (Sinhala:තෙසාරා ජයවර්ධන) is a Sri Lankan film and teledrama actress, singer, dancer , television presenter, and author.

== Personal life ==
Thesara is married to Jeeth Sumedha Samarasekara. The wedding was celebrated at Eagles Lake Side Banquet & Conventional Hall in Attidiya, Ratmalana.

== Beyond acting ==
Thesara is a full-time Senior Lecturer at the University of Moratuwa and is also a visiting Lecturer at the University of Sri Jayewardenepura, Chartered Accountants of Sri Lanka (CASL), Edulink Campus, Imperial Institute of Higher Education, Saegis Campus and CFPS Law School.

She has won the World Prize for her academic achievements in marketing in 2012. This award was presented to her for the outstanding Performance at the Postgraduate Diploma in Marketing conducted by the Chartered Institute of Marketing (UK).

== Career ==
She won OCIC / SIGNIS tele Award for Best Actress 2008 and the Best Supporting Actress Award in the State National Tele Drama Awards (Rajya Sammana Ulela) for her outstanding role as Fathima in "East is Calling". (Sinhala:නැගෙනහිර වෙරළෙන් ඇසෙනා).

== Television ==
Her maiden teledrama acting came through Athbhutha Laampuwa directed by Bennette Ratnayake.

=== Selected television serials ===
- Ataka Nataka
- Athbhutha Laampuwa
- Dhawala Yamaya
- Hima Kandulu
- Kapa Nasna Samaya
- Kekiri
- Meedum Seveneli
- Mihidum Sihina
- Nagenahira Weralin Asena as Fathima
- Pas Mal Pethi
- Pathihi
- Rangana Vijithaya
- Sabanda Babanis as Simona
- Sabanda Eliyes as Komali
- Sakisanda Suwaris as Simona
- Samanaliyak Iki binda
- Sanda Biligath Raththriya
- Sandali Saha Radika as Radika
- Situ Gedara
- Sneha as Sakuni
- Wasuda

== Filmography ==
Her maiden cinema acting came through 2006 film Sihina Devduwa directed by Suresh Kumarasinghe.

Year	Film	Role	Ref.
2006	Sihina Devduwa	Natasha	
2006	Ammawarune	Doctor's wife	
2007	Yahaluvo	Meera	
2008	Maan	Kethiswaree	
2009	Sanda Tharaka	Tharushi	
2010	San Sun Inn	Apsara	
2011	Kara & Sara	Teesha	
2014	Jal & Bari	Inspector Nisha	
2014	Sam's Story	Captain Elmo's daughter	
2018	Vaishnavee	Laxmi's friend	
2018	Nidahase Piya DS	Doctor Perera	

== Bibliography ==
Year	Title	ISBN	Notes
2011	Sanda Nodutu Tharaka (Sinhala:සඳ නොදුටු තාරකා)	ISBN 978-955-671-462-3	Sarasavi Publishers
2014	Hiru Nodutu Dedunu (Sinhala:හිරු නොදුටු දේදුනු )	ISBN 978-955-671-866-9	Sarasavi Publishers
2013	Hunger Games (Sinhala:කුසගිනි ක්‍රීඩාව – 1 )	ISBN 978-955-671-795-2	Sarasavi Publishers Sinhala translation of The Hunger Games by Suzanne Collins
2015	Catching Fire (Sinhala:කුසගිනි ක්‍රීඩාව – 2 )	ISBN 978-955-671-980-2	Sarasavi Publishers Sinhala translation of The Hunger Games by Suzanne Collins
2016	Mockingjay (Sinhala:කුසගිනි ක්‍රීඩාව – 3 )	ISBN 978-955-31-0129-7	Sarasavi Publishers Sinhala translation of Mockingjay by Suzanne Collins
2019	Kalu Samanallu (Sinhala:කළු සමනල්ලු)	ISBN 978-955-46-3543-2	KBOOKS Publishing (Sinhala:කේබුක්ස් ප්‍රකාශන)
2020	Meherunnisa The Twentieth Wife (Sinhala:මෙහෙරුනීසා ද ට්වෙන්ටියත් වයිෆ්)	ISBN 978-955-46-3538-8	KBOOKS Publishing (Sinhala:කේබුක්ස් ප්‍රකාශන)
