= Welikathara =

Welikathara වැලි කතර
- Gamini Fonseka as A. S. P. Randeniya in the climax scene of the film
- Directed by: D. B. Nihalsinghe
- Written by: Tissa Abeysekera
- Produced by: D. B. Nihalsinghe; Swarnamali Gunatunge
- Starring: Joe Abeywickrema; Gamini Fonseka
- Cinematography: D. B. Nihalsinghe
- Music by: Somadasa Elvitigala
- Release date: 27 October 1971
- Running time: 118 minutes
- Country: Sri Lanka
- Language: Sinhala

Welikathara (Sinhala, වැලි කතර), is a 1971 action thriller drama film made by Sri Lankan director D. B. Nihalsinghe. Screen play and script by Dr. Tissa Abeysekara. It is the maiden film directed by D. B. Nihalsingha. The film stars Gamini Fonseka and Suvineetha Weerasinghe in lead roles along with Joe Abeywickrama, Piyasena Ahangama and Kithsiri Perera in supportive roles.

Since Welikathara was the first film in CinemaScope in Sri Lanka, it faced many obstacles, first of which was the lack of access to cinemas capable of showing that format. (Most of them had been reserved for US films). This was solved by arranging a cross circuit release, combining cinemas in the three competing circuits at that time- another first.

The film was a box office success as well as being critically appreciated, going on to be presented by a Sri Lankan Presidential Award as one of the Ten Best Sri Lankan films of all time.

== Production ==
The film is about the clash between Goring Mudalali (Joe Abeywickrema) and ASP Randeniya (Gamini Fonseka). The film marked the turning point in the career of many of those who were involved in it. D. B. Nihalsingha went on to direct several other award-winning films, Ridi Nimnaya, Maldeneiye Simieon and Kelimadala, before he went on to pioneer color television production in Sri Lanka and South Asia. It was loosely based on a true story and the first screenplay by Tissa Abeysekara, who went on to become one of Sri Lanka's best script writers.

Tissa Abeysekara, previously an "additional dialogue writer" to Lester James Peris, marked his entry as a screenplay writer with Welikathara. He went on to become Sri Lanka's foremost script writer thereafter. Joe Abeywickrema, who until then was a comedy actor, went on to become a character actor of repute with his magnificent performance.

Gamini Fonseka, who was Sri Lanka's foremost star at that time, gave a significant performance where, in a total reversal of the heroic roles he portrayed, he acted out a character in decline. Somadasa Elvitigala added one more feather to his cap with this film after the beautiful musical score he created for Sath Samudura. The 1st Assistant Director is Ranjith Newton Fernando and the 2nd Assistant Director is Tissa De Silva.

== Cast ==
- Gamini Fonseka as Wickrema 'Wicky' Randeniya ASP
- Joe Abeywickrama as Goring Mudalali 'Dipthilage Mudiyanselage Sudu Banda'
- Suvineetha Weerasinghe as Geetha Randeniya
- Sugeela Lekchumanan as Geetha Randeniya (child)
- Kithsiri Perera as Attanayake
- Piyasena Ahangama as Abeyratne
- Devika Karunaratne as Muthu Menika
- Nawanandana Wijesinghe as Lavanis
- Dayananda Jayawardena as Martin
- Karu Nanayakkara as Stocky policeman
- G. W. Surendra as Speech giver
- G. R. Perera as Tarzan Kumara
- Chandra Kaluarachchi as Bathik dress discusser
- Elson Divithurugama as Wickrama's debator
- P. B. Miyalawa as Luncheon senior
- Buddhi Wickrama as Goring's associate
- Tudor Karunathilake as Police officer

== Production ==
The film was shot in Point Pedro and was South Asia's and Sri Lanka's first to be done in cinemascope. It was a box office success after its first screening on October 27, 1971 and critically well received.

== Awards and nominations ==
- Presidential Film Award in 1999
- Named 10th Best Sri Lankan Film of the first 50 years by Presidential council in 1997
