= Sihina Devduwa =

Sihina Devduwa සිහින දෙව්දුව
- Directed by: Suresh Kumarasinghe
- Written by: Suresh Kumarasinghe
- Produced by: Vinu Veththamuni
- Starring: Saliya Sathyajith; Thesara Jayawardane; Rajitha Hiran
- Cinematography: Lalith M. Thomas
- Edited by: Kumarasiri de Silva
- Music by: Asela Indralal
- Distributed by: Ridma Theatres
- Release date: 6 March 2009
- Country: Sri Lanka
- Language: Sinhala

Sihina Devduwa (Sinhala: සිහින දෙව්දුව) is a 2009 Sri Lankan Sinhala drama thriller film directed by Suresh Kumarasinghe and produced by Vinu Veththamuni. It stars Saliya Sathyajith and Thesara Jayawardane in lead roles along with Indika Fernando and Rajitha Hiran. Music composed by Asela Indralal. It is the 1121st Sri Lankan film in the Sinhala cinema.

== Cast ==
- Saliya Sathyajith as Vishwa
- Thesara Jayawardane as Natasha
- Indika Fernando
- Nanda Wickramage
- Rajitha Hiran
- Melani Asoka
- Vinu Veththamuni
