= Somaweera Senanayake =

Sri Lankan screenwriter and novelist (1944–2018)

- සෝමවීර සේනානායක
- Born: 25 November 1944; Udugama, Sri Lanka
- Died: 9 June 2018 (aged 73); Colombo, Sri Lanka
- Resting place: Godigamuwa Cemetery, Maharagama
- Education: Vidyodaya University
- Occupations: journalist, author, scriptwriter
- Known for: Doo Daruwo, Ammawarune, Yashoravaya
- Notable work: Doo Daruwo, Yashoravaya
- Children: 2
- Awards: Sumathi Best Teledrama Script Award (2000)

Somaweera Senanayake (25 November 1944 – 9 June 2018; Sinhala: සෝමවීර සේනානායක) was a Sri Lankan award-winning teledrama and script writer who also worked as a journalist, short story writer and as a novelist in his career. He died on 9 June 2018 at a private hospital in Colombo at the age of 73.

== Early life ==
Somaweera Senanayake was born in 1944 in a village near Avissawella area. He attended a village mixed school in Kudagama for his primary education and finished his secondary education at the Seethawaka Central College and also at the Rajasinghe Central College before obtaining an Arts Degree from Vidyodaya University (now known as Sri Jayawardenepura University). He began his career as a journalist at the Lake House and became a chief editor.

== Career ==
He also pursued his writing skills from being a journalist to a novelist and had published several well known novels in Sri Lankan literature such as Yashoravaya, Mawakage Geethaya, Baladevage Lokaya, Irahanda Payana Loke and Ambu Samiyo. Somaweera became the first Sri Lankan to receive a Master of Arts Degree for a novel (for Yashoravaya). He had published about 17 novels and written 10 children's short stories during his lifetime. He had also written cartoon stories to the Sri Lanka's first ever cartoon paper, Sathuta.

Somaweera Senanayake also stepped into the small screen industry as well as in the Sinhala film industry as a script writer. He had written scripts for over 30 teledramas including Doo Daruwo, Asal Vesiyo, Palingu Menike, Uthuru Kuru Satana, Sitha Niwana Katha and Charitha Thunak. He also wrote scripts to Ammawarune which was directed by late veteran film director Lester James Peiris and Mihidum Sihina. In 2000, he received the Sumathi Best Teledrama Script Award for the teledrama Uthuru Kuru Satana.

== Death ==
Somaweera Senanayake died on 9 June 2018 at 73 years old in a private hospital in Colombo of a heart attack while receiving treatment. The funeral was held on 11 June 2018 at the Godigamuwa Cemetery in Maharagama.
