= Awaragira =

Awaragira අවරගිර
- Directed by: Lester James Peries
- Written by: Tony Ranasinghe
- Based on: Awaragira (novel) by G. B. Senanayake
- Produced by: Dil Films
- Starring: Joe Abeywickrama; Iranganie Serasinghe; Tony Ranasinghe
- Cinematography: Donald Karunaratne
- Edited by: Gladwin Fernando
- Music by: Premasiri Khemadasa
- Distributed by: Dil Process International
- Release date: 1 September 1991
- Country: Sri Lanka
- Language: Sinhala

Awaragira (Sinhala: අවරගිර) is a 1990 Sri Lankan drama film directed by Lester James Peries and produced by Dilman Jayaratne for Dil Films. This film was based on the novel 'Awaragira' by G.B. Senanayake. It stars Joe Abeywickrama, Iranganie Serasinghe and Tony Ranasinghe in lead roles along with Lucky Dias and Vasanthi Chathurani. Music composed by Premasiri Khemadasa. It is the 836th Sri Lankan film in the Sinhala cinema. The film was released from May 14 to 27, 2004 at the Regal in Colombo and nine other CEL circuit cinemas for a short release.

== Cast ==
- Joe Abeywickrama as K.B. Sethigala
- Tony Ranasinghe as Ranbanda
- Iranganie Serasinghe as Dingiri Menike
- Kamal Addararachchi as Dayaweera
- Sanoja Bibile as Vinitha
- Vasanthi Chathurani as Vasantha
- Lucky Dias as Wickrama
- Rathna Lalani Jayakody as Seetha
- Samanthi Lanerole as Vinitha's mother
- Swarna Mallawarachchi
- Ranjan Ramanayake as Priyankara
- Leena de Silva as Kusuma
- Bandula Suriyabandara as Vinitha's father
- Susila Kottage as Asilin, Vinitha's servant

== Plot ==
K.B.Sethigala and Dingiri Menike are husband and wife respectively. Mr. Sethigala has an issue with Ranbanda since long ago because Ranbanda's father had claimed Sethigala's house. As a result, Sethigala had to leave their house. Ranbanda's family moves to Kandy, the city where Sethigala lives. Dayaweera informs about this but Sethigala does not show pleasure about that. Dayaweera, Priyankara are Sethigala's Elder and younger son respectively. Vasantha is his only daughter. Dayaweera develops a relationship with Ranbanda's daughter Seetha and marries her. After that Priyankara develops a relationship with Vinitha who is a daughter of an ASP. Priyankara is a university student. Dayaweera is an Engineer. Sethigala is an entrepreneur. Ranbanda introduces Wickrama to Sethigala at a party. Wickrama becomes interested in Seeta. Sethigala invites Wickrama to help him with his business work.

Wickrama had moved from Rathnapura to Kandy so that is the reason he came to the party. He had had a relationship with Seetha in the past. He has a bad reputation when he was in Rathnapura. Seetha had refused to marry him. Vinitha has had a relationship with a guy in her neighbourhood but she got married with Priyanakara because her parents persuaded her. Seetha is angry with Wickrama so she comes to live at Sethigala's home with Dayaweera. She also carries plans so that Sethigala excludes Wickrama from his businesses. Wickrama does not care about Vasantha and neglects her. So Vasantha develops a mental illness. One day Vinitha had written a letter and runs out from her house to escape with the aforementioned guy who she had a previous relationship but she comes back because he refused to marry her. Dingiri Menike sees the letter and reads it and gets to know about what has happened. She does not tell it to Priyankara as she thought it would create more trouble. Priyankara goes to the club to meet Wickrama there to request him to treat Vasantha well and Wickrama tells him about Vinitha. Priyankara goes home and asks Dingiri manike whether it is true or not. She admits it is true and Priyankara commits suicide by poisoning himself.

Vasantha gets to know about the incident and is heartbroken. One day she sees a coffin emerging from a wall of her bedroom. Next day her father comes to visit him. The final scene of the film is a meeting between Dayaweera, Vasantha and Wickrama. Vasantha accuses Wickrama for causing all the trouble and accuses him of spending money for other women that he has secret relationships with. Vasantha asks them to stop but Dayaweera kills Wickrama. Vasantha kills Dayaweera by stabbing him. The story ends with a scene of Sethigala and Dingiri Manike seated next to each other in their garden.

== Awards ==
=== Sarasaviya Awards ===
Year	Nominee / work	Award	Result
1996	Awaragira - Irangani Serasinghe	Best Actress	Won
1996	Awaragira - Vasanathi Chathurani	Best Supporting Actress	Won
1996	Awaragira	Best Art Director	Won
1996	Awaragira - Donald Karunaratne	Best Cameraman	Won
