= Girls' High School, Kandy =

Location
- Kandy, Central Province; Sri Lanka; 7°17′13″N 80°37′36″E

Information
- School type: National / Public 1AB
- Motto: A Deo Auxilium ("Our Help Cometh from the Lord", adapted from Psalm121:1)
- Religious affiliation: Methodist / Wesleyan
- Established: 21 May 1879; 147 years ago
- Founder: Samuel Langdon, Methodist Church of Great Britain
- Educational authority: Ministry of Education
- School code: 03379
- Principal: Renuka Edirisinghe
- Grades: Grade 1 – 13
- Gender: Girls
- Age: 6 to 19
- Enrollment: 6000+
- Language: Sinhala, English, Tamil
- Schedule: 7:30 AM - 1:30 PM
- Houses: Eaton; Langdon; Lawrance; Sansom
- Colors: Dark blue, light blue, green, and yellow
- Song: Forty years on when we think of time olden
- Athletics: Yes
- Sports: Yes
- Brother School: Kingswood College, Kandy
- Pupils: Ladies of High School
- Abbreviation: KGHS
- Website: www.ghskandy.edu.lk

Girls' High School, Kandy is a national girls' school located in Kandy, Sri Lanka. It was founded in 1879 by Wesleyan Methodist missionaries and is the oldest school for girls in Kandy.

== History ==
=== Early years ===
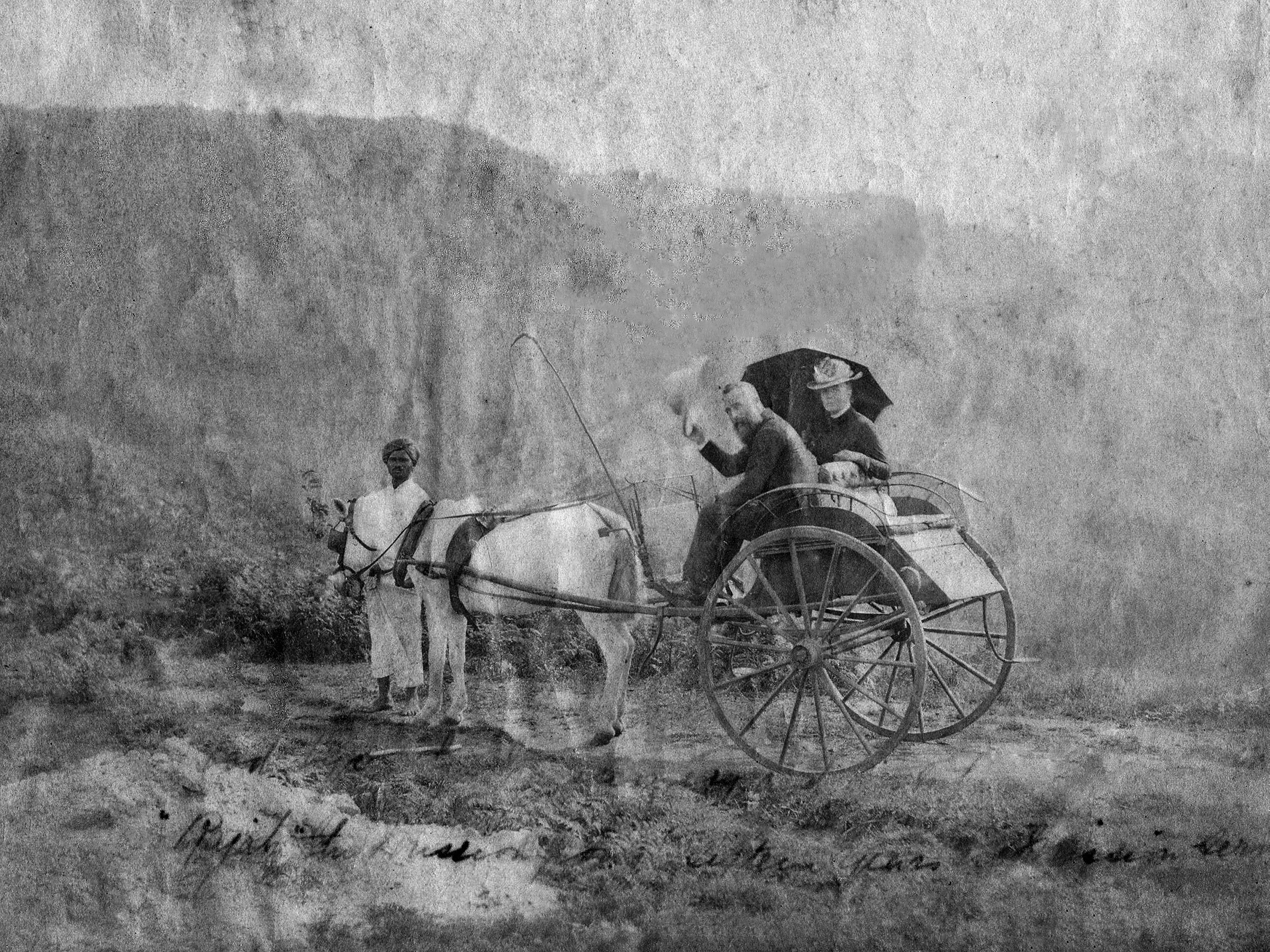
Rev. Samuel Langdon and his wife

In 1873, the need for a school in connection with Wesleyan Mission work was urged by Rev. S. Langdon and so a Day and Boarding school was built in Katukele, Kandy Sri Lanka.

The school was opened in 1879 at the Wesleyan school chapel adjoining the Girls' Boarding School, Katukele-Kandy, under the management of Mrs Langdon. Miss Payne, the next principal arrived in Colombo on 31 July 1879 but left the school in 1880. In May 1880 Miss Hay came from England and the school, which had 10 on the roll at its inception, increased to 70 and was registered to obtain a grant-in-aid from the government.

As numbers increased, in 1881 the school shifted to the more commodious precincts of the Mission in Brownrigg Street, but boarders remained at Katukele. Classes were held behind the church. Long desks and forms without backs and heavy pews from the church were moved weekly when classes had to take turns in writing. There were no games, Guiding, debating or netball, not even a library.

Since its inception the school has represented the ethnic diversity of Sri Lanka, with its student body consisting of Sinhalese, Tamils, Moors, Malays, Burghers and Chinese.

=== 20th century ===
With the dawn of the 20th century, under the guidance of F. R. Sansom, who served for 19 years, Kandy High School became one of the leading educational institutions in Ceylon. On 21 March 1917, the first company of Girl Guides was formed on the Island. Sansom prepared the way for this and Jane Green Calverly, the vice-principal was the first captain. This was followed by the 1st Brownie Company and the Ranger Company in 1918 and 1921. In June 1920 a plague broke out in Kandy and 262 students were ordered to leave the premises overnight. The kindergarten and Std 2 shifted to Trinity College, Std 3 and 4 were housed at the YWCA opposite the police station and the senior girls at the YWCA near Kandy Lake. Calverly had a busy time cycling from one place to another and supervising the classes, so she invested in a scooter which made her day easier. In 1917 the first company of Girl Guides was formed on the island, and the school was the first to play netball in Sri Lanka.

== Houses system ==
The four houses are Eaton, Langdon, Lawrance, and Sansom. Their respective house colours are light blue, dark green, yellow and dark blue.

- - Eaton House (symbolises the sky and it is for patience and honesty)
- - Langdon House (symbolises the earth and it is for prosperity and productivity)
- - Lawrence House (symbolises the sun and it is for brightness and sharpness)
- - Sansom House (symbolises the mountain and it is for courage and stability)

== Sports ==
The school's chess team has succeeded considerably in international, all-island and provincial tournaments. In 2013, school won the All Island under 15 'B' Division Badminton Championship for the Janaka Bogollagama Memorial Shield. In the same year, they became the champions in chess for the fourth successive year at the All-Island Schools Chess Championship. In 2017, The Under 11 chess team became the champions of the Under 11 Girls’ (‘A’ Division) event at the All- Island Chess festival for the second consecutive time. In 2014 the team became all-island champions of their respective under 9 age category.

In 2011, they won the Central Province Schools under 19 Table Tennis, Volleyball (under 19) Championships and under 14 and under 15 'Milo' netball titles in tournaments organised by the Central Province Education Department. In 2018, the girls won Under 18 Provincial Netball Championship. In 2019, girls won several events at the Junior Nationals, Sir John Tarbat Senior Athletic Championship and All Island Relay Championship.

The school has produced several notable netball players to national team such as Maheesha Bandara, Venuki Boyagoda, Faika Feroze and Yohani Nilupuli de Silva.

Following sports are available on Girls' High School.

- Netball
- Basketball
- Table tennis
- Chess
- Hockey
- Carrom
- Judo
- Volleyball

== Societies ==
There are 18 school societies in Girls' High School, Kandy.

- Research Society
- Entrepreneurship Society
- Science Society
- Astro Club
- Aviation Club
- Leo Club
- Media Unit - The Media Unit of Kandy Girls' High School is an active unit to produce young media personalities. The unit organizes the all-island, trilingual, inter-school Media Day Competition and the Media Day as "Shasthra Dhara" annually.
- Photography Club
- Interact Club
- Buddhist Society
- English Debating Society
- French Club
- Tamil Literary Union
- Islamic Society
- Girl Guide
- Dancing Club
- St. Jhones
- Yowun Gaweshika

== Past principals ==
S. Langdon was the first principal of the school who had a tenure from 1879 to 1880. R. Allen was the last Methodist principal. In 1945, Grace Paul became the first Sri Lankan principal in the school’s history. In 1964, Hema Jayasinghe became the first old girl to become the principal of the school.

Name	Time range	
Name	Date entered office	Date departed office
S. Langdon	1879	1880
E. S. Hay	1880	1883
Young	1883	1888
M. R. Smith	1888	1890
Lawrance	1890	1900
F. R. Sansom	1891	1919
J. Green Calverly	1920	1921
C. M. Gordon	1921	1934
E. M. Shire	1934	1935
R. Allen	1935	1944
G. J. Paul	1945	1955
Erica La Brooy	1955	1963
Hema Jayasinghe	1964	1967
Charitha Abayaratna	1967	1969
T. K. Ekanayake	1969	1990
H. M. M. K. Amunugama	1990	2000
G. N. Silva	2000	2002
R. N. Amarasinghe	2002	2003
K. D. S. Perera	2003	2004
H. M. Wataliyadda	2004	2007
Malkanthi Abeygunasekera	2007	2023
Nilanka Abeywardene	2023	2024
Renuka Edirisinghe	2024	2026
Poornima Weeramuni	2026	Present

== Notable alumni ==
- Irangani Serasinghe (a Sri Lankan actress)
- Jean Arasanayagam (an English-language poet and fiction writer)
- Preeni Withanage ( Chartered engineer )

== See also ==
- Kingswood College, Kandy
