= Jayatissa Alahakoon =

Sri Lankan musician (1932-2019)

Jayatissa Alahakoon ජයතිස්ස අලහකෝන්
- Born: Alahakoonge Don Jayatissa; 6 May 1932; Nittambuwa, Sri Lanka
- Died: 23 January 2019 (aged 85); Colombo, Sri Lanka
- Education: Sri Sangharaja Central College
- Occupations: Musician, Violinist, Composer
- Years active: 1952–2002
- Spouse: Anula Dissanayake
- Children: 6
- Father: Martin Perera

Visharada Alahakoonge Don Jayatissa (born 6 May 1932 – died 23 January 2019 as Sinhala: ජයතිස්ස අලහකෝන්) [Sinhala]), popularly known as Jayatissa Alahakoon, was a prolific music director and composer in Sri Lankan cinema and theater.

== Personal life ==
He was born on 6 May 1932 in Attanagalla, Nittambuwa, Sri Lanka. He grew up in a small house next to the New Olympia Cinema on Daly Road in Maradana. His father Alahakoonge Don Martin Perera was a playwright and singer at the Tower Hall. His father also acted in the early films such as Podi Putha and Rekhava. From 1946 to 1985 he lived on Dudley Road, Maradana, Colombo. Jayatissa completed education from Maradana Sri Sangharaja Central College.

He was married to Anula Dissanayake of Peradeniya. The couple had four sons: Waruna, Aruna, Nuwan, Anuradha and two daughters: Waruni and Geetha. Eldest son Waruna is the Deputy Director of the Aesthetics Division of the Ministry of Education. Geetha is a dancer who plays a major role in the play Vikruthi.

He died on 23 January 2019 at the age of 85.

== Career ==
When his father realized Jayatissa's passion for music, father sent him to several musicians such as H. W. Rupasinghe, M. Romulus Silva, T. D. Edwin Perera and W. Sylvester to study music formally. Later he mastered the violin under W. D. Amaradeva and Victor Perera. In 1968 he passed the Central Examination from the Bhatkhande Music Institute Deemed University, Lucknow and was appointed as a Government Music Teacher and worked in several schools in the island.

Since 1960, he involved in the stage plays as a music director. He was a close friend of popular director G. D. L. Perera. First a music assistant he played violin to Ananda Samarakoon's play Kalu Ethana, Prof. Ediriweera Sarachchandra's Maname, Kada Walalu, Gunasena Galappaththi's Sanda Kinduru, Mudu Puththu, Devatha Eli, Liyathambara, Thaththa, Dharmadasa Kuruppu's Senaka Nadagama and Prof. M. H. Gunathilaka's Sakkaya Ditti. He performed on the Tower Hall with his violin contributions to popular songs of the renowned stage plays Wessanthara, Sirisangabo, Shakuntala, Suvinitha Bharya, Vidura, Dharmasoka, Padmawathi and Sri Wickrama. In 1958, he co-directed music for the stage play, Thammenna directed by G. D. L. Perera.

In 1960, he became the music director for the play Saama directed by G. D. L. Perera. In 1961, while directing the music, three talented musicians were selected for the orchestra for the play Sakkarawattama. They were Sarath Dassanayake with sitar, Victor Rathnayake with violin and Wijeratne Ranatunga with tabla. Among the plays he composed music for are columns, plays, lyric plays, sealing plays, realistic plays, stylized plays. He has directed music in a number of stage plays: G. D. L.'s Magul Mathe and Mehew Lokeka, Chandi Kannangara's Hevayo, S. Karunaratne's Buhuman Soya, Wetta Pittala, Erabadu Mal and Mala Kolan, Sugathapala Senarath Yapa's Mati Balallu, Hiru Nonagina Rajaya, Sumana Aloka Bandara's Sadukin Nivana Kiri Kandulak, Gunasena Galappaththi Mahene Ririyaka, Namel Weeramuni's Hatharaweni Thattuwa, Madyawediyakuge Asipatha, Mungen Ang, Mudalinayake Somaratne's Gini Kandu and Suneth Gokula's Ran Pihatu.

Also, as a professional artist, he has decorated the backgrounds of a number of stage plays. He also composed music for the self-produced drama Embala Sahodara. In 1965 he made his maiden background song for the film Saama directed by G. D. L. Perera. In the film, he composed the music for one of the songs: "Wananthare Gal Arane". Screened in 1968, he directed the music for G. D. L.'s film Dahasak Sithuvili and composed melodic songs for three songs including popular song "Sathuta Vilai Sepatha Malai".

Meanwhile, he also composed music for several popular artists: "Ai Thavamath Mula Wenna" and "Minimuthu Nehe Mata" (by Wijeratne Warakagoda), "Galak Pala Galak Dutimi" and "Amma Amma" (by Mallika Perera), "Kap Suwahas Kal" and "Kuravi Kevillan" (by Nanda Malini). During this period, he worked as a music teacher at Sanghabodhi Vidyalaya, Maradana and Vidyawardana Vidyalaya, Borella. His final music direction came through G. D. L.'s film Hora Police.

On 2 September 1976, Jayatissa was the lead actor in the short film Sirisena Saha Violinaya, made by young artists who had the opportunity to make a Sinhala film under the State Film Corporation's Short Film No. 1 program. The background music was also done by Jayatissa. In 2017, he was honored with Suwada Padma Silva Award for his contribution to the Sinhala song.

== Filmography ==
Year	Film	Role	Ref.
1965	Saama	Composer	
1968	Dahasak Sithuvili	Composer	
1968	Hora Police	Composer	
1976	Sirisena Saha Violinaya	Sirisena	
2000	Chakrayudha	Composer	
