= Tharanga =

Tharanga is both a given name and a surname. Notable people with the name include:

- Tharanga Goonetilleke, Sri Lankan soprano opera singer
- Tharanga Lakshitha (born 1982), Sri Lankan cricketer
- Tharanga Paranavitana (born 1982), Sri Lankan cricketer
- Tharanga Suresh (born 1981), Sri Lankan cricketer
- Pulina Tharanga (born 1993), Sri Lankan cricketer
- Supun Tharanga (born 1986), Sri Lankan cricketer
- Upul Tharanga (born 1985), Sri Lankan cricketer

== See also ==
- Jeevana Tharanga, film
