= Suba (film) =

- Directed by: Ariyadasa Peiris
- Written by: Ariyadasa Peiris
- Produced by: Charithamali Films
- Starring: Muthu Tharanga; Manjula Moragaha; Cletus Mendis
- Cinematography: Dinesh Kumara
- Edited by: Randika Nadeeshan
- Music by: Rohana Weerasinghe
- Release date: 5 November 2010
- Country: Sri Lanka
- Language: Sinhala

Suba is a 2010 Sri Lankan Sinhala drama film directed by Ariyadasa Peiris and co-produced by K.R. Sirwardana, Ajith Kulathunga, W.R. Dammika, Swetha De Silva and Ariyadasa Peiris for Charithamali Films. It stars Muthu Tharanga and Manjula Moragaha in lead roles along with Cletus Mendis and Sanoja Bibile. Music composed by Rohana Weerasinghe. It is the 1146th Sri Lankan film in the Sinhala cinema.

== Cast ==
- Muthu Tharanga
- Manjula Moragaha
- Cletus Mendis
- Apsara Boteju
- Sanoja Bibile
- Sandun Wijesiri
- Jeevan Handunneththi
- Ranjith Peiris
- Premadasa Vithanage
- Gratiel Chitrangani
