= Avurududa =

1986 film directed by Wimal Saman Jayaweera

Avurududa අවුරුදු දා
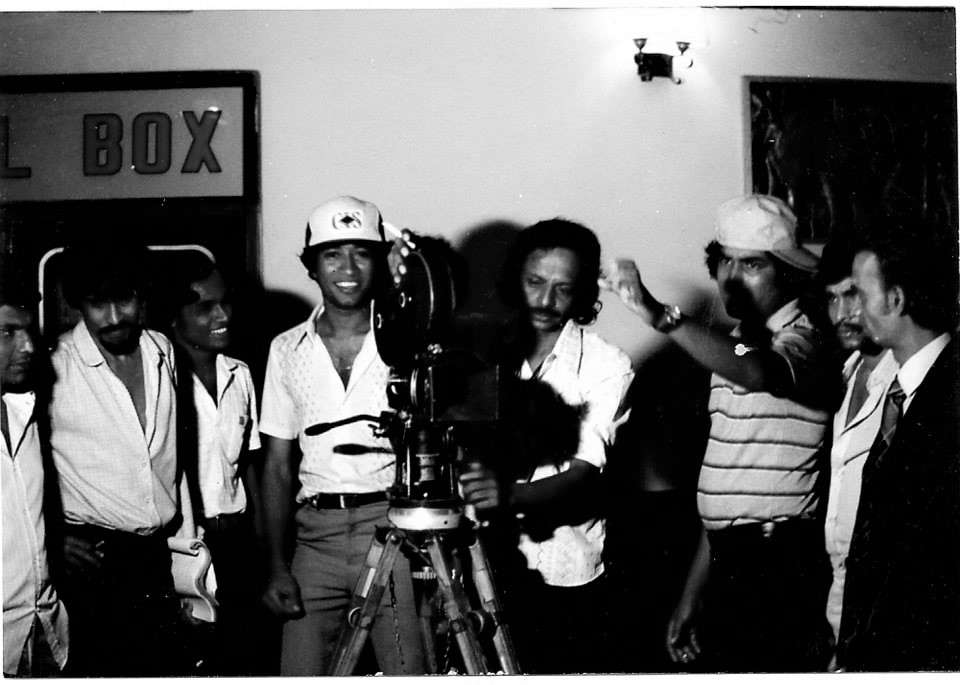
- Crew of Avurududa
- Directed by: Wimal Saman Jayaweera; Nimal Tennakoon
- Written by: Nimal Tennakoon
- Produced by: S.S Cine Talents
- Starring: Malani Fonseka; Henry Jayasena; Iranganie Serasinghe; Sanath Gunathilake; Ranjith Mahendra Peiris; Somie Ratnayake
- Cinematography: Merceline S. Perera
- Music by: Premasiri Kemadasa
- Release date: 5 December 1986
- Running time: 75 minutes
- Country: Sri Lanka
- Language: Sinhalese

Avurududa (අවුරුදු දා), is a 1986 Sri Lankan Sinhala language drama film co-directed by Wimal Saman Jayaweera and Nimal Tennakoon and co-produced by Saman Jayaweera, Padmasiri Ranasingha and Sarath Kulathunga for S.S Cine Talents. Music directed by Premasiri Khemadasa.

Avurududa received favorable reviews and won the 1986 Presidential award for the best Screenplay.

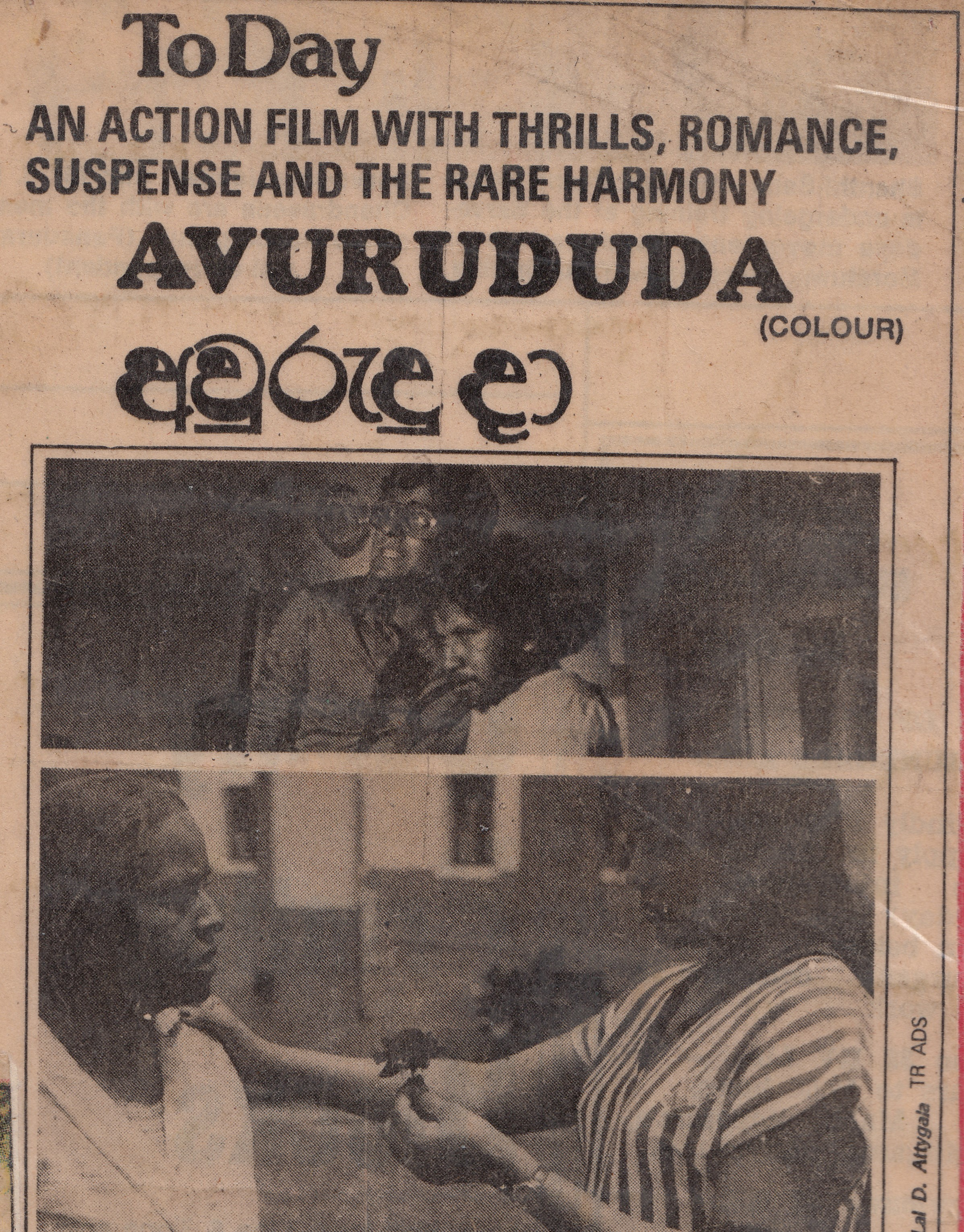
Avurududa paper adverticement

== Cast ==
- Malini Fonseka
- Sanath Gunathilake
- Henry Jayasena
- Iranganie Serasinghe
- Somy Rathnayake
- Miyuri Samarasinghe
- Ranjith Mahendra Peiris
- Piyaratne M. Senarath
- T. M. Sangadasa

== Technical crew ==
- Song _ Malani Bulathsinhala
- Art direction by Kithsiri Mevan Jayasena and Chandraguptha Thenuwera
- Makeup and Costumes by Ranjith Mathagaweera
- Assistant directors were Christy Shelton Fernando and Ranjith Liyanarchchige
- Special voice by Hettiarchchi
