= G. B. Senanayake =

Sri Lankan Author

- ජී.බී. සේනානායක
- Born: 14 July 1913; Mulleriyawa, Sri Lanka
- Died: 16 March 1985 (aged 71); Ekala, Ja-Ela
- Resting place: Borella Cemetery
- Education: Ananda College
- Occupation: Author
- Notable work: Medha, Waradaththa, Awaragira
- Relatives: P. B. Senanayake (nephew)

Gunathilake Bandara Senanayake (14 July 1913 – 16 March 1985) (known as G.B Senanayake) (Sinhala: ජී.බී. සේනානායක) was a prominent Sinhala author who portrayed Sinhala middle-class life in his novels. He is credited with introducing free verse poetry to Sinhala. He became blind later in his life and still managed to write 16 books with help from his sister-in-law Deemathi Senanayake and niece Dayani Senanayake.

The second stage of Sinhala short stories begins with G.B. Senanayake's short stories. Though mainly focused on short stories Senanayake also wrote Novels and Poetry as well. He introduced 'Nisandas' during a time when Sinhala poetry was in need of a different style. G.B. Senanayake was a writer who was very concerned about being grammatically correct in writing.

== Biography ==
Born on 14 July in the year 1913 in Mulleriyawa, Colombo, Gunathilaka Bandara Senanayake was the youngest of a family of four boys.

He had his primary education at St. Joseph's College in Grandpass. Then he had his secondary education at Ananda College Colombo. Due to economic problems he gave up schooling at the age of 14.

Later he did further studies on his own. At the age of 18 he started going to the public library in Colombo which gave him the opportunity to access thousands of books. G.B. Senanayake calls the public library his own university.

Martin Wickramasinghe, then editor of the 'Dinamina' newspaper recognising G.B. Senanayake's abilities offered him a job at Lake House. For some time Senanayake worked as a professional journalist at 'Dinamina' and 'Sinhala Bauddhaya'.

Later he left Lake House and while living an unmarried life devoted his time to writing books.

G.B. Senanayake was awarded the Sahithya Shoori (literary doctrine) award by the Sri Jayawardanapura University in 1985.

During the later part of his life Senanayake started losing his eyesight. Yet notwithstanding, he didn't give up writing. 'Vinividimi Andura' is a book written during that time.

G.B. Senanayake died on 16 March 1985 in Ekala, Ja-Ela. His final resting place is Borella Cemetery, Colombo

== Literary work ==
At the age of 19 he started writing short stories to the newspapers. Though they weren't published he didn't give up. This was how Martin Wickramasinghe got to know about Senanayake's talents.

Senanayake's first collection of short stories was 'Duppathun Nethi Lokaya' which was published in 1945. This was followed by 'Paliganima' (revenge), published in 1946. The works he included in 'Paliganima" calling works between prose and poetry is considered as the beginning of 'Nisandas' (Free Verse Poetry).

Some of his books are used as text books for Sinhala General Certificate of Education Advanced Level examination and at Universities.

Three of his novels won the Sinhala Literary Awards granted by the Ministry of Cultural Affairs. The novel 'Medha' is a historical novel based on the Indian society during the time of the Enlightened One. 'Medha' was first published in 1964 in Sinhala.

When he lost this eyesight he was halfway through writing the book 'Sahithya Sithuwili Dharshana'. When he declared his fear of being unable to finish the book his sister-in-law offered to write it if dictated. Out of his 50 odd books about 20 were written after he became blind.

His last poem 'Rathriya' was written barely five hours before his death.

== Contribution towards the development of Sinhala short stories ==
G.B. Senanayake is considered as the writer who paid special attention to the artistic side of short stories and developed Sinhala short stories from a skilled aspect.

Senanayake improved Sinhala short stories as a pleasing and flexible medium. Especially language and structure were more polished in G.B. Senanayake's works. On the other hand, the characters and incidents are allowed to develop with an interrelationship with reason and result in his stories. Likewise G.B. allows incidents and facts causing the incidents and the mental status caused by the incident and its development to come out automatically.

It can be seen that Senanayake's stories improved the composition and regulations of Sinhala short stories. G.B. Senanayake has been a person who has shown ability in drawing the language flexibly into fiction writing. He thought that written language was artificial. He didn't fancy high flown language used by intellectuals.

Critics show that it was G.B. who highlighted the importance of poetic styles in short stories.

It is said that Senanayake became more prone to artistic side of the work because he was influenced by foreign literature. Being influenced by French and Russian literature would have forced Senanayake to exceed the limits of Sinhala short stories.

G.B. was most influenced by French short story styles, especially [Guy de Maupassant]. Maupassant tried to bring out the tragedy of the high class. Likewise Senanayake tried to speak about the middle class of the middle-class people living in towns. He brought it out in a more personalised manner rather than bringing it in a subject wise manner. Because of this while bringing out feelings he also brought out signs and descriptions of the environment.

Looking at how Russian literature affected G.B. Senanayake's works it seems that Anton Chekhov's works have influenced him. Especially exploring the artistic beauty of his own short stories was a path he found from Russian literature.

== Films and television productions ==
Films and television productions, based on G.B. Senanayake's books,

- Nidhanaya
- Awaragira
- Duwata Mawaka Misa (Mother Alone)

== G.B Senanayake Foundation ==
G.B Senanayake Foundation is an approved charitable organization by the Government of Sri Lanka. The G.B Senanayake Foundation has been established with the objectives of preservation of manuscripts, first editions of all his books, tape recording and photographs related to his life and work.
