= Jean Arasanayagam =

Sri Lankan poet (1931–2019)

- Born: Jean Lynette Christine Solomons; 2 December 1931 Kandy, Sri Lanka
- Died: 30 July 2019 (aged 87)
- Occupation: Writer
- Education: Girls' High School, Kandy; University of Peradeniya; University of Strathclyde
- Genre: Fiction, Poetry
- Spouse: Thiyagarajah Arasanayagam
- Children: 2

Jean Arasanayagam (born Jean Solomons; 2 December 1931 – 30 July 2019) was a Sri Lankan poet and fiction writer. She wrote her books in English, and they have been translated into German, French, Danish, Swedish and Japanese.

== Biography ==
Jean Lynette Christine Solomons, born on 2 December 1931 in Kandy, Sri Lanka, was the youngest of three children born to Harry Daniel Solomons and Charlotte Camille (née Jansz).

Arasanayagam attended the Girls' High School, Kandy, graduated from the University of Peradeniya, and received a Master of Arts in Linguistics from the University of Strathclyde.

While primarily recognised as a poet, Arasanayagam was also a talented painter who showcased her artwork at Commonwealth exhibitions in London and Paris, as well as at the Lionel Wendt Art Centre in Colombo.

Her husband along with their daughters, Devasundari and Parvathi, all possess a deep love for writing. Thiyagarajah achieved recognition by winning the Gratiaen Prize in 2016, while Parvathi has established herself as a published writer in the genres of fiction, short stories, and poetry.

She died on 30 July 2019, aged 88, after a brief illness.

== Dominant themes ==
Throughout Arasanayagam's diverse body of work–which encompasses poetry, short fiction, fiction, and memoirs–she consistently explores several prominent themes, including identity, heritage, displacement, and ethnic violence.

Critics widely acknowledge that the year 1983 had a profound impact on Arasanayagam's literary career, leading to a noticeable sense of urgency and heightened political awareness in her writing after that period. Her collection Apocalypse 83 (1984) specifically addresses the riots that took place in July 1983, serving as a strong protest against the anti-Tamil violence that unfolded in the aftermath of Sri Lanka's independence.

Being married to a person of Tamil-Hindu ancestry, she became a target of Sinhala nationalist forces during the events of Black July in 1983. Living in Kandy, Sri Lanka, at the time and working as a lecturer in a teachers' college in the nearby town of Peradeniya, she and her family faced direct threats. A mob set fire to a neighbor's house and posed a danger to the Arasanayagam family themselves. As a result, they were forced to flee their home, seeking refuge in the houses of sympathetic neighbors before being ultimately taken to a refugee camp by the army. This traumatic experience profoundly influenced her personal identity and subsequently became a recurring theme in her writing, as she explored the events of Black July and other acts of violence witnessed in the country following its independence.

Arasanayagam also wrote about the suffering of women during the colonial period, highlighting the period's prevalent patriarchal practices. An example of this can be seen in "Maagdenhuis - The House of the Virgins Amsterdam/Kalpitiya," where she narrates the experiences of Dutch female orphans who were brought to Sri Lanka to serve as sexual companions for Dutch colonisers. Through her writing, she exposes the exploitative nature of colonial relationships and highlights the suffering endured by women subjected to such circumstances.

== Critical reception ==
Katrina M. Powell said Arasanayagam's poetry ‘uniquely links identity, documentation and alienation’. Reggie Siriwardene, the Sri Lankan poet and critic, described her work as being the voice of ‘our collective sense of horror and tragedy” after her first-hand experience of the violence of the ethnic riots translated into her writing. Furthermore, Alka Nigam stated that her poetry "in ‘mournful melodies’ struggles with both the inner and outer turmoil,” agreeing with Arasanayagams's own admission that "the crux of her poems is a life time's search for an identity". Similarly, Melanie Murray sees Arasanayagam's poems as ‘engaging with issues of identity and territory by exploring her (colonial) past to come to grips with the present’.

Arasanayagam's poetry was integrated into a convocation at Bowdoin College, where the college's then-president, Barry Mills expressed admiration for her significant contributions, describing her as a "voice of conscience, of experience, of wisdom, and of hope." He commended her for generously supporting and encouraging young writers and recognised her profound impact on the literary community and her commitment to fostering the growth and development of aspiring writers.

== Awards and recognition ==
Arasanayagam's several noteworthy achievements during her career.

In 1990, she was honored as an Honorary Fellow in the Creative Activities of the International Writing Programme at the University of Iowa. She also served as a visiting fellow at the Faculty of Arts at the University of Exeter and held the position of international writer-in-residence for the University of Exeter and Southwest Arts in the United Kingdom in 1994.

In recognition of her literary prowess, Arasanayagam received the Premchand Fellowship from India's Sahitya Akademi in 2014. In 1984, she was the recipient of the National Award for Literature, a testament to her outstanding literary contributions. In 2017, The Life of the Poet won the Gratiaen Prize. The same year, she was also honored with the Sahityarathana, which acknowledged her lifetime achievements and immense contributions to literature in Sri Lanka.

== Publications ==
=== Poetry ===
- Kindura (1973)
- Poems of Season Beginning and a Season Over (1977)
- Apocalypse '83 (1984)
- The Cry of the Kite (1984)
- A Colonial Inheritance and Other Poems (1985)
- Out of Our Prisons We Emerge (1987)
- Trial by Terror (1987)
- Reddened Waters Flow Clear (1991)
- Shooting the Floricans (1993)
- Nallur
- ruined gopuram
- mother-in-law
- Fusillade

=== Prose ===
- The Cry of the Kite (A collection of short stories) (Kandy, 1984)
- The Outsider (Nagasaki University: Bulletin of the Faculty of Liberal Arts, 1989)
- Fragments of a Journey (Colombo : WERC, 1992)
- All is Burning (New Delhi : Penguin Books India, 1995)
- Peacocks and Dreams (New Delhi : Navrang, 1996)
- In the Garden Secretly and Other Stories (Penguin, 1999)
