= Sumathi Best Teledrama Script Award =

The Sumathi Best Teledrama Script Award is presented annually in Sri Lanka by the Sumathi Group of Campany associated with many commercial brands for the best Sri Lankan script of the year in television screen.

The award was first given in 1995. Following is a list of the winners of this prestigious title since then.

Year	Best Script	Teledrama	Ref.
1995	Jayantha Chandrasiri	Dandubasnamanaya	
1996	K.B Herath	Isiwara Asapuwa	
1997	Tissa Abeysekara	Pitagamkarayo	
1998	Nimal Senanayake	Durganthaya	
1999	Prasanna Jayakody	Nisala Wila	
2000	Somaweera Senanayake	Uthuru Kuru Satana	
2001	Susiran de Silva	Ekata Gatuma	
2002	Sumithra Rahubadda	Kulawamiya	
2003	Prasanna Jayakody	Hada Wila Sakmana	
2004	Jayalath Manoratne	Ramya Suramya	
2005	Lalith Rathnayake	Theth Saha Wiyali	
2006	Reginald Jayamanna	Wasantha Kusalana	
2007	Aruna Premaratne	Rala Bidena Thana	
2008	Tissa Abeysekara	Kaluwara Gedara	
2009	Lalith Rathnayake	Arungal	
2010	Rasika Suraweera Arachchi	Abarthu Atha	
2011	Sudath Dharmasiri	Swayanjatha	
2012	Aruna Premaratne	Me Wasantha Kalayay	
2013	Namal Jayasinghe	Appachchi	
2014	Aruna Premaratne	Chess	
2015	Jackson Anthony	Daskon	
2016	Sumith Rathnayake	Maddahana	
2017	Jackson Anthony	See Raja	
2018	Lalith Rathnayake	Thaththa	
2019	Namal Jayasinghe	Weeraya Gedara Awith	
2020	Susith Wijemuni	Thanamalvila Kollek	
2021	Wasantha Karunaratne	Sakarma	
2022	Supun Rathnayake	Thumpane	
2023	Prasanna Jayakody	Eya Dan Bandala	
