= Abhinikmana =

- Sinhala: අභිනික්මන
- Directed by: Hector Kumarasiri
- Written by: Hector Kumarasiri
- Produced by: Vas Media Films
- Starring: Sudarshana Bandara; Lochana Imashi; Mahendra Perera
- Cinematography: Nimal Nakalanda
- Edited by: M. S. Aliman
- Music by: Nimantha Heshan
- Distributed by: CEL Theatres
- Release date: April 19, 2013
- Country: Sri Lanka
- Language: Sinhala

Abhinikmana (Sinhala: අභිනික්මන) is a 2013 Sri Lankan Sinhala spiritual drama film directed by Hector Kumarasiri and produced by Nimal Chandrasiri for Vas Media Films. It stars Sudarshana Bandara and Lochana Imashi in lead roles along with Mahendra Perera, Joe Abeywickrama and Iranganie Serasinghe. Music composed by Nimantha Heshan. It is the 1187th Sri Lankan film in the Sinhala cinema.

The film recorded as the final film acting of cinema legend Joe Abeywickrama.

== Cast ==
- Sudarshana Bandara as Buddhadasa 'Budhadasi Hamudurwo'
- Lochana Imashi as Seedevi
- Mahendra Perera as Somadasa
- Iranganie Serasinghe as Buddhadasa's Amma
- Joe Abeywickrama as Buddhadasa's Thatha
- W. Jayasiri as Chief monk
- Manohari Wimalathunga as Veda Hamine
- Jeevan Handunnetti as Dancing Mama
- Premadasa Vithanage as Upasaka Appu
