= Beddegama (film) =

- Directed by: Lester James Peries
- Written by: A.P. Gunarathne; Lester James Peries
- Story by: Leonard Woolf
- Based on: The Village in the Jungle
- Produced by: P. Wilfred Perera
- Starring: Malini Fonseka; Joe Abeywickrama; Vijaya Kumaratunga
- Cinematography: Willie Blake; Donald Karunaratna
- Edited by: Gladwin Fernando
- Music by: Nimal Mendis
- Release date: February 20, 1981 (Sri Lanka)
- Running time: 130 minutes
- Country: Sri Lanka
- Language: Sinhala

Beddegama (The Village in the Jungle) is a 1981 Sinhala drama film directed by Lester James Peries that follows the lives of village people in British Colonial Sri Lanka. The film is based on the 1913 book The Village in the Jungle by Leonard Woolf. Sir Arthur C. Clarke also has a minor role in the film as an English Judge.

== Plot ==
The lives of a poor family in a small village called Beddegama (literally, "The village in the jungle") as they struggle to survive the challenges presented by poverty, disease, superstition, the unsympathetic colonial system, and the jungle itself. The head of the family is a hunter named Silindu, who has two daughters named Punchi Menika and Hinnihami. After being manipulated by the village authorities and a debt collector, Silindu is put on trial for murder

== Cast ==
- Malini Fonseka as Punchi Menika
- Joe Abeywickrama as Silindu
- Vijaya Kumaratunga as Babun
- Tony Ranasinghe as Fernando mudalali
- Nadeeka Gunasekara as Hinni hami
- Trilicia Gunawardena as Karalina, Silindu's sister
- D. R. Nanayakkara as Exorcist and traditional physician
- Henry Jayasena as Village head Babehami Arachchi
- Arthur C. Clarke as Leonard Woolf
- David Dharmakeerthi as Mudali
- Indira Abeydheera as Nanchohami
- Vincent Vaas

== See also ==
- List of Sri Lankan films
