= Heenatigala =

- Village
- Location within Sri Lanka
- Coordinates: 06°01′45″N 80°15′25″E
- Country: Sri Lanka
- Province: Southern Province
- District: Galle
- Time zone: UTC+5:30 (Sri Lanka Standard Time)

Heenatigala is a village in Galle District in Sri Lanka, located 8.8 km (5.5 mi) south-west of Galle and 4 km (2.5 mi) west of Unawatuna.

Heenatigala is located between the A17 highway and A2.

== See also ==
- List of towns in Southern Province, Sri Lanka
