= Sivali Central College =

- සීවලී මධ්‍ය විද්‍යාලය

Location
- Ratnapura; Sri Lanka; 6°42′48″N 80°23′07″E

Information
- Type: National
- Motto: Pagngnaya Parisujjati (Verily, let thy soul be made pure by way of wisdom.)
- Religious affiliation: Buddhist
- Established: 1909; 116 years ago
- Founder: A. C. Attygalle
- Authority: Ministry of Education
- Principal: Cptn. Neel Dhammika Wathukarawaththa
- Staff: 35
- Faculty: 140
- Grades: Lower Middle (6th class) - Advanced High (13th class)
- Gender: Co-educational
- Age: 11 to 19
- Enrollment: Over 3500
- Education system: National Education System
- Language: English; Sinhala
- Colours: Green and Gold
- Alumni: Sivalites
- Website: sivalicc.lk

Sivali Central College is a school situated in Hidellana, near Ratnapura, Sabaragamuwa Province, Sri Lanka. The school provides secondary education to boys and girls aged 11 to 19 and has a student population of around 3,500.

== History ==
Sivali Central College was founded as a Buddhist secondary school unconnected to any monastery in 1909 by A. C. Attygalle. It was initially located in a small house on Warakathota Road in Ratnapura. In 1925 the chief monk of Nadun Viharay in Ratnapura offered the property Sivali Garden to the school and in 1935 it was renamed as Sivali College. With the introduction of the free education system by C. W. W. Kannangara, Sivali College became the Sivali Central College. It was the first Central College in Ratnapura district. It moved to Hidellana in 1955. Sivali Central College became a National College on 5 February 1992.

== Houses ==
The school is divided into four houses, each named after significant figures and symbols in Sri Lankan history and culture. Each house competes throughout the year to accumulate points for the House Cup during the Inter-House Sports Meet.

1. Atigala - Yellow
2. Parakrame - Green
3. Vijaya - Red
4. Gaemunu - Blue
