= Henry Jayasena =

Sri Lankan actor (1931–2009)

Henry Jayasena හෙන්රි ජයසේන
- Born: Bastiankoralage Henry Rodrigo Jayasena; 6 July 1931; Gampaha, Sri Lanka
- Died: 11 November 2009 (aged 78); Colombo South (Kalubowila) General Hospital - Sri Lanka
- Education: Lorenz College Gampaha; Nalanda College Colombo
- Occupations: Film, television, and stage actor, Playwright and Director
- Years active: 1958–1999
- Known for: Acting, cinema, theatre
- Spouse: Manel Ilangakoon (m. 1962)
- Children: Sudaraka Jayasena
- Awards: Doctor

Kala Keerthi Dr Bastian Koralage Henry Rudrigo Jayasena (born 6 July 1931 – died 11 November 2009 as Sinhala: හෙන්රි ජයසේන), popularly known as Henry Jayasena, was an actor in Sri Lankan cinema, theater and television. With a career spanning more than four decades, Jayasena is considered one of the best dramatists in Sri Lankan drama.

== Personal life ==
He was born on 6 July 1931 in Bendiyamulla, Gampaha. He attended the Gampaha branch of Lorenz College for primary education. He then attended Nalanda College Colombo for his secondary education. During his time at the school, he was classmates with many successful people, among who were Dr. Dharmasena Attygalle, Karunaratne Abeysekera, Dr. Harischandra Wijayatunga, Dr. Hudson Silva, Hon. Rupa Karunathilake,

Jayasena was married to fellow actress Manel Ilangakoon in 1962. Manel played the lead role in Jayasena's play Kuweni and won the best actress award for her performance at the State Drama Festival. The couple has one son, Sudaraka Jayasena. Manel has acted in many popular television serials such as Ekagei Kurullo, Sathpura Wasiyo and Hiru Kumari. She died in 2004 at age 68.

== Early career ==
Prior to acting, Jayasena began his career as an assistant teacher of English at the Dehipe Primary School in Padiyapellela in the Nuwara Eliya district in 1950. While teaching at the school, he directed his first stage play, Janaki. However, Jaysena left this post a few months later after passing the General Clerical Service Examination and securing a job with the Public Works Department (PWD) of Sri Lanka.

Before retiring from government work, he also served as Deputy Director for the National Youth Services Council in the Arts and Sports Division as well as the Sri Lanka Rupavahini Corporation in Programs Division.

== Golden career ==
While with Public Works Department, Jaysena created many of his most famous plays, including Pawkarayo (1958), Janelaya (1962), Kuweni (1963), Thavath Udesenak (1964), Manaranjana Wedawarjana (1965), Ahas Malilga (1966), Hunuwataye Kathawa (1967), Apata Puthey Magak Nethey (1968), Diriya Mawa (1972), Makara (1973) and Sarana Siyoth Se Puthini Habha Yana (1975).

Jaysena started his cinema career with the 1959 film Sri 296 with the role "Jayaweera". During the 1960s, Jaysena played the starring roles of "Piyal" in Gamperaliya (1964), "Azdak" in Hunuwataye Kathawa (1967) and "Lalith" in Dahasak Sithuvili (1968) and Avurududa (1986).

He also worked consistently in television series after the introduction of television to Sri Lanka in the late 1970s. Jayasena was involved with the Sri Lanka Rupavahini Corporation from its early beginnings in the 1980s. He portrayed the role of "Sudu Seeya" in the tele drama Doo Daruwo directed by Nalan Mendis and written by Dr. Somaweera Senanayaka. The serial became highly popularized and was awarded at many local television award festivals. It was the longest tele drama telecast during the 1990s in Sri Lanka.

Jayasena retired from acting in 1999 due to treatments for a terminal disease. However, he made two supporting appearances in two films, Punchi Suranganavi in 2002 and Randiya Dahara in 2004.

=== Selected stage plays ===
- Harischandra
- Janelaya
- Thavath Udesanak
- Manaranjana Wedawarjana
- Ahas Maliga
- Hunuwataye Kathawa
- Kuweni
- Apata Puthe Magak Nathe
- Diriya Mawa
- Makara
- Sarana Siyoth Se Puthuni Haba Yana

== Beyond acting ==
Apart from acting, he also worked as a screenplay writer, lyricist and author. He contributed to the local newspaper by writing for the "Artscope page" of the Sri Lanka Daily News for many years.

=== Author work ===
- Minisun Woo Daruwo
- Hunuwataye Kathawa
- Karaliyaka Kathawak
- Niliyakage Kathawak
- Nim Nethi Kathawak
- Balga Gilano
- Adarshawath Baenku Niyamuwaku A Gaman Maga
- Sudu Seeyage Kavi Sindu
- Play Is The Thing
- Kuweni
- Janelaya

== Legacy ==
In 2003, Jayasena was presented with Nalanda Keerthi Sri award by his school Nalanda College, Colombo.

== Filmography ==
Year	Film	Role	Ref.
1959	Sri 296	Jayaweera	
1959	Gehenu Geta	Bandula	
1963	Wena Swargayak Kumatada		
1963	Gamperaliya	Piyal	
1963	Suhada Sohoyuro		
1964	Heta Pramada Wadi	Manager	
1966	Seegiri Kashyapa	Chandra Deva	
1967	Sadol Kandulu		
1968	Dahasak Sithuvili	Lalith	
1972	Atheethayen Kathawak		
1972	Miringuwa		
1977	Maruwa Samaga Wase	Police Inspector	
1979	Palagetiyo	Gunadasa	
1979	Dutugemunu	King Kavanatissa (voice)	
1979	Handaya	Perera	
1980	Hansa Vilak	Douglas Ranawira	
1980	Ganga Addara	Head Doctor	
1981	Baddegama	Village Headsman	
1981	Soldadu Unnehe	Willie 'Mahattaya'	
1981	Sooriyakantha	Kirthi Bandara	
1982	Thana Giravi	Doctor Siri Kulasekara / Douglas Kulasekara	
1982	Kadawunu Poronduwa remake	Doctor	
1983	Kaliyugaya	Piyal	
1984	Hima Kathara	Captain	
1984	Ammai Duwai		
1986	Avurududa		
1988	Sandakada Pahana	Shelterer	
1993	Ordinary Magic	Priest	
1996	Amanthaya		
2002	Punchi Suranganavi	Doctor	
2004	Randiya Dahara	Samantha's father	
