= Tharanga Suresh =

Sri Lankan cricketer (born 1981)

Tharanga Suresh (full name Weerakonda Arachchige Tharanga Suresh Weerakoon; born 8 October 1981) was a Sri Lankan cricketer. He was a left-handed batsman and right-arm off-break bowler who played for Singha Sports Club. He was born in Galle.

Having played for Singha Under-23s during the 2000 season, Suresh made a single first-class appearance for the senior team, during the 2003-04 Premier Championship. He scored 18 runs in the first innings in which he batted, from the lower-middle order, but when placed at the top of the order in the second innings, scored a duck.
