= Getawarayo =

- Directed by: Mike Wilson; Tissa Liyanasuriya
- Written by: K.A.W. Perera
- Produced by: Shesha Palihakkara
- Starring: Gamini Fonseka; Sobani Amarasinghe; Nilmini de Silva; Joe Abeywickrema; Carl Gunasena; Jeevarani Kurukulasuriya; Tony Ranasinghe
- Cinematography: W. A. Rathnayake
- Edited by: Titus Thotawatte
- Music by: W.D. Amaradeva
- Distributed by: Serendib Productions
- Release date: 1964
- Running time: 108 minutes
- Country: Sri Lanka
- Language: Sinhala

Getawarayo is a 1964 Sri Lankan drama film co-directed by Mike Wilson and Tissa Liyanasuriya and produced by Shesha Palihakkara. The film starring Gamini Fonseka in lead role along with Sobani Amarasinghe, Joe Abeywickrema, Jeevarani Kurukulasuriya and Tony Ranasinghe made supportive roles.

Screened on February 24, 1964, the film was a critically acclaimed production and a blockbuster. The movie won the Best Director and Best Film awards at the 1965 Sarasaviya Film Festival.

== Plot ==
A village fisherman Jayasena Fernando (Gamini Fonseka) acquires a job in the city at the company where his friend Semanaris (Joe Abeywickrama) works. As Jaya becomes successful he draws the ire of rich boatsman Lalith Hettiarachchi (Carl Gunasena) and the interest of his boss's daughter Surangani (Nilmini De Silva). Jaya gradually forgets about his former girlfriend Karuna (Sobini Amarasinghe) after a misunderstanding with her brother(Vincent Vaas) and begins vying for Sue's attention. In the end Jaya realizes that Sue doesn't matter to him and that he loves Karuna. He decides to go back home after beating Lalith in a motor boat race. Karuna however has married when Jaya returns and the film ends with him contemplating his future to the strains of Amaradeva's voice.

Tony Ranasinghe plays a newspaper reporter who is sympathetic to Jaya.

== Cast ==
- Gamini Fonseka as Jayasena 'Jaya' Fernando
- Joe Abeywickrama as Semaneris
- Sobani Amarasinghe as Karuna
- Karl Gunasena as Lalith Hettiarachchi
- Nilmini de Silva as Suranganie 'Sue' Frederick
- Vincent Vaas as Bandusena
- Tony Ranasinghe as Mr. Ilangakoon
- Paul Ekman as Paul Ekman
- Hector Ekanayake as Douglas 'Dougie' Ekanayake
- Thilakasiri Fernando as Jaya's Thaththa
- Douglas Wickremasinghe as Mr. Frederick
- Lakshmi Bai as Maldeniya Hamine 'Hani Hamy'
- Devika Karunaratne as Jaya's sister
- Bandu Munasinghe as Boxer
- M. A. Simeon as Semaneris' derisive co-worker
- Pujitha Mendis as Bucket hat actor ("Etha Gaw Ganan")
- Austin Abeysekara as Store Mudalali
- Dayananda Jayawardena as Bar visitor
- Donald Karunaratna as Dancer ("Etha Gaw Ganan")

== Production ==
The movie was Sesha Palihakkara's second production. Gamini Fonseka was chosen to star in the film as he was becoming a major star at the time. It was first screened on February 26, 1964.

== Soundtrack ==
W.D. Amaradeva composed the majority of the movie's music. "Etha Gaw Ganan Durin" was sung by Narada Disasekara with lyrics by Mahagama Sekera and music by Amaradeva. Amaradeva composed and sang "Swarna Vimanaya" with lyrics by Madawela S. Ratnayake.
