= Preeni Withanage =

Sri Lankan mechanical engineer and petroleum sector official

Eng. Preeni Withanage
- Occupation: Chartered Mechanical engineer

D. T. K. Preeni Withanage is a chartered mechanical engineer and was an upstream petroleum sector official in Sri Lanka. She served as the Director National Development at the Petroleum Development Authority of Sri Lanka (PDASL) from July 2009 to October 2026. Earlier in her career, she worked in manufacturing technology at the National Engineering Research and Development Centre (NERD) and later in Sri Lanka's upstream petroleum sector.

== Career ==
Withanage headed the Centre for Manufacturing Excellence (CME) at the National Engineering Research and Development Centre (NERD). The centre had been established to provide technological support to Sri Lankan industry in areas including precision manufacturing, die and mould production, computer aided design and manufacturing, research and development, and technical training.

From July 2009 to October 2026 she served as Director National Development at the Petroleum Development Authority of Sri Lanka, where her work included resource monetisation, local content development, contract management, fiscal modelling and the coordination of operational and environmental authorisations for Sri Lanka's upstream petroleum sector.

Withanage was involved in formulation of Sri Lanka's upstream petroleum policies including Sri Lanka National Policy on Natural Gas policy. In 2017, she took part in consultations on the country's long term electricity generation plan, helping to plan the electricity generation policy of Sri Lanka from 2018 to 2037.

In 2018 and 2019, she was involved in plans for new offshore exploration licensing rounds covering the Mannar and Cauvery basins. She also proposed a natural gas fund to manage potential government revenues from offshore hydrocarbon resources and development of a national natural gas policy. She was involved in drafting the national natural gas policy framework covering the natural gas value chain, private sector participation, public consultation and implementation of the policy.

Withanage was listed as a “Role Player” by the World Women Leadership Congress in 2016.
