= Dahasak Sithuvili =

- DVD cover for the film
- Directed by: G. D. L. Perera
- Written by: G. D. L. Perera
- Produced by: Hela Kala Pela
- Starring: Henry Jayasena; Nilanthi Wijesinghe; Joe Abeywickrama
- Cinematography: D. B. Nihalsinghe
- Edited by: S. M. Nizar
- Music by: Jayatissa Alahakoon
- Release date: 20 September 1968
- Country: Sri Lanka
- Language: Sinhala

Dahasak Sithuvili is a 1968 Sri Lankan film directed and written by G. D. L. Perera and produced by Hela Kala Pela. The film stars Henry Jayasena and Nilanthi Wijesinghe in lead roles, whereas Joe Abeywickrama, Malini Fonseka and Denawaka Hamine made supportive roles. Music was directed by Jayatissa Alahakoon. The film won several awards at local film festivals.

== Cast ==
- Henry Jayasena as Lalith
- Nilanthi Wijesinghe as Nilanthi Pannawana
- Joe Abeywickrama as Sunny
- Malini Fonseka as Lalith's sister
- Denawaka Hamine as Lalith's mother
- Dhamma Wanniwarachchi as Sagara
- D.R. Nanayakkara as Man on bus
- Tony Ranasinghe as Music master
- Ione Weerasinghe as Lila
- Sumana Amarasinghe as Sagara's office receptionist
- Elson Divithurugama as Party goer
- Buddhi Wickrama as Lalith's co-worker
- Chandra Kaluarachchi as Nilanthi's aunt

== Awards ==
- Best Film – 2nd place at 6th Sarasaviya Awards - 1969
- Best Editor – S.A. Nizar at 6th Sarasaviya Awards - 1969
- Best Director – G.D.L. Perera at 6th Sarasaviya Awards - 1969
- Special Award – Kala Pela at 6th Sarasaviya Awards - 1969
- Best Actor – Henry Jayasena 2nd place at Vicharaka Sammana Ulela 1969
- Best Cinematographer – D. B. Nihalsinghe 2nd place at Vicharaka Sammana Ulela 1969
- Best Script Writer – G.D.L. Perera 2nd place at Vicharaka Sammana Ulela 1969
- Best Story – Henry Jayasena 2nd place at Vicharaka Sammana Ulela 1969
