= Adarawanthayo =

- Directed by: Amaranath Jayathilake
- Starring: Tony Ranasinghe
- Release date: 24 November 1968
- Running time: 130 minutes
- Country: Sri Lanka
- Language: Sinhalese

Adarawanthayo is a 1968 black & white Sri Lankan drama film directed by Amaranath Jayathilake.
