= Doo Daruwo =

- Created by: Somaweera Senanayake
- Starring: Henry Jayasena; Iranganie Serasinghe; Yashoda Wimaladharma
- Country of origin: Sri Lanka
- Original language: Sinhala
- No. of episodes: 230

Production
- Running time: 30 minutes

Original release
- Network: Rupavahini
- Release: 1990 – 1995

Doo Daruwo (Sinhala, 'children') was one of the longest running Sri Lankan television serials, airing from 1990 to 1995. It was one of the most popular shows of its time and drew in 8 million viewers at its peak.

== Plot ==
This was a story that revolved around a family; how a family starts, grows rich by indulging in all types of vices and more importantly, how it changes over generations while infusing different social morals into it.

== Cast and crew ==
=== Cast ===
- Henry Jayasena – Sudu Seeya
- Iranganie Serasinghe - Dulsey Aachchi
- H.A. Perera - Dias
- Sunethra Saratchandra - Kusumalatha
- Neil Alas - Sumanadasa
- Veena Jayakody - Sudharma
- Jayalath Manoratne - Punsiri
- Chandani Seneviratne - Nandani
- Nilmini Tennakoon – Deepthi
- Chithra Warakagoda - Indumathi
- Ajith Lokuge - Jayantha
- Yashoda Wimaladharma – Priyanvada
- Kelum Wijesuriya
- Deepani Silva - Gnawathi
- Buddhi Wikrama - Simion
- Chandra Kaluarachchi - Asilin

=== Crew ===
- Director – Nalan Mendis
- Producer– Sandya Mendis-Susila Productions
- Scriptwriter – Somaweera Senanayake
- Asst. Director – Udeni Alwis/ Roshan Dhananjaya/ Gamini Silva
- Art Director – Kumara Dahanayake
- Cameraman – Ayeshmantha Hettiarchchi
- Music Director – Rohana Weerasinghe
- Make-up Director – J Suranimala/ Rohan Mudannayake/ W. Jayatissa
- Editor – Ravindra Guruge/ Sisira K Senaratne
