= Shesha Palihakkara =

Sri Lankan actor and dancer (1928–2009)

Shesha Palihakkara ශේෂා පලිහක්කාර
- Born: David Sydney Loku Palihakkara; June 5, 1928; Kadawatha, Sri Lanka
- Died: July 12, 2009 (aged 81); Colombo
- Education: St. Benedict's College, Colombo; St. Joseph's College, Colombo
- Occupation: Actor
- Years active: 1953-2001
- Notable work: Rekava

David Sydney Loku Palihakkara (June 5, 1928 – July 12, 2009), popularly known as Shesha Palihakkara, was a Sri Lankan dancer, film actor, and producer. He achieved critical recognition with a starring role in Lester James Peries' masterpiece Rekava and as producer of Getawarayo, Saravita and Ranmuthu Duwa.

== Personal life ==
Palihakkara was born in the village of Ruppagoda, in Kadawatha of the Gampaha district. He attended the St. Benedict's College, Colombo in Kotahena and St. Joseph's College in Colombo. At the age of 14, Palihakkara witnessed the Sinhala dancer Chitrasena perform in the Vidura ballet and was inspired to be a dancer.

Palihakkara left school without getting his Senior School Certificate in his late teens, and went to India to train at Shanthi Nikethan. He stayed at the school for two years focusing on dance along with painting and sculpting. Palihakkara then enrolled at the Institute of Kala Kshethra in South India majoring in dance.

After finishing his studies, he returned to Sri Lanka in 1948 and took part in a national pageant organized in celebration of the country's recent independence. Later with the help of Dr. P.R. Anthonis and K.D.A. Perera, Palihakkara briefly started a dance school in Borella. He left for England in 1949 to join the Indian dancer Ramgopal's travelling ballet troupe, which performed in various venues in Europe.

Shesha died on July 12, 2009.

== Cinema career ==
Shesha Palihakkara with Clarice de Silva in the film Matalang (1955)

On his return to Sri Lanka, Palihakkara was asked to choreograph movies like Ahankara Isthri and Puduma Leli. He got his first starring role in Matalang and travelled to Madras, India to film the movie in 1953. Palihakkara played a cruel king and his rogue bandit son; the film was a huge success and made Palihakkara a heart throb in Sri Lanka.

He next appeared in Rekava as an astrologer and stilt walker. The film wasn't a box office hit, but was critically praised and is considered a landmark in Sri Lankan cinema. In 1954, Palihakkara worked in the makeup department of the United States film Bridge on the River Kwai which was filmed in Sri Lanka.

After the film was made, Palihakkara traveled to London to rejoin his friend Ramgopal and his dancing troupe. Ten months later he became a member of the Asian Music Society. In 1959 he was stricken with asthma and returned to Sri Lanka.

With the help of director Mike Wilson and Sir Arthur C. Clarke, Palihakkara developed the first Sinhala colour film Ranmuthu Duwa in 1960 for his production group Serendib Productions. It was also the first Sinhala film to feature under water scenes of the ocean surrounding Sri Lanka. His second production Getawarayo was directed by Mike Wilson and Thissa Liyanasooriya and won several awards at the 1966 Sarasaviya Awards. His last production Sarawita was made the following year.

Palihakkara abandoned his film career after Saravita and pursued business in the plantation industry. He returned to film in the 2000s (decade) with a role in Chandran Ratnam's production Romeo and Juliet written and directed by Rob Nevis .

In 2007, Palihakkara was honored with a Ranathisara award at the Sarasaviya Festival for his contributions to cinema.

== Filmography ==
Year	Film	Acting role	Other roles
1955	Matalang	Chitramba Kumaru / Matalan	
1956	Ramyalatha		Choreographer
1956	Rekava	Stilt walker / balloon vendor	Make-up Artist
1962	Ranmuthu Duwa		
1964	Getawarayo		Producer
1965	Saravita		Producer
1967	Ran Rasa		Make-up Artist
1970	Lakseta Kodiya		
1978	Seetha Devi		Make-up Artist, Choreographer
1980	Ektam Ge		Make-up Artist
1980	Sankhapali		Choreographer
1981	Sagarayak Meda		Make-up Artist
1982	Bambara Geethaya		Make-up Artist
1982	Sakvithi Suwaya	Notharis Unnahe	Make-up Artist
1984	Hima Kathara		Make-up Artist
1985	Adara Kathawa		Make-up Artist
1986	Peralikarayo		Make-up Artist
1987	Viragaya		Make-up Artist
1987	Sathyagrahanaya	Mr. Ranataunga	Producer, Art Director, Make-up Artist
1990	Christhu Charithaya		Make-up Artist
1993	Ragini		
2001	Poronduwa		
