= Iranganie Serasinghe =

Sri Lankan actress, teacher and journalist (born 1927)

Iranganie Serasinghe අයිරාංගනී සේරසිංහ
- Born: Iranganie Roxanna Meedeniya; 9 June 1927 (age 99); Ruwanwella, British Ceylon
- Education: St. Bridget's Convent; Bishops' College; Girls' High School, Kandy; University of Ceylon (BA)
- Occupations: Teacher (Musaeus college); Journalist (Times, SLBC); Film, Television and Stage actress
- Years active: 1956-2020
- Spouses: Prof. S.B. Dissanayake (Div.); Winston Serasinghe
- Children: 2
- Relatives: J. H. Meedeniya (grandfather); D. R. Wijewardena (uncle); Francis Molamure (uncle); Tissa Vitharana (brother-in-law); Ranil Wickramasinghe (first cousin once removed (younger generation))
- Awards: Kala Keerthi, Sri Lankan of the year

Iranganie Roxanna Meedeniya (born 9 June 1927), best known as Iranganie Serasinghe, is a Sri Lankan actress of stage, cinema and television. Since her debut in Rekava, Serasinghe has become recognized for playing motherly figures in various films and television serials. She is the aunt of former president Ranil Wickramasinghe.

== Early life and education ==
She was born on June 9, 1927, in Mudungomuwa, Ruwanwella, Sri Lanka, to Joseph Hercules Meedeniya, Rate Mahatmaya of Ratnapura and Violet Ellawela. Her paternal grandfather was J. H. Meedeniya Adigar was elected unopposed to the Ruwanwella seat in the State Council, and her uncles included D. R. Wijewardena and Sir Francis Molamure. Her mother was the sister of Nanda Ellawala's father, who was a Member of Parliament for Ratnapura. She had three siblings: Indrani Meedeniya, Kamani Vitharana, who married Professor Tissa Vitharana and Mahinda Meedeniya.

Her early touches with nature later led her to become an environmental activist. While attending Bishop's College she played in several end-of-term plays; at Girls' High School, Kandy whilst pursuing a HSC; Meedeniya took a leading role in Bernard Shaw's Pygmalion. Against her father's and Rate Mahatthaya's wishes, Meedeniya entered the University of Colombo in 1947 with the support of her cousins. He died in her first year away, at a time when Marxist ideas were the norm. She immersed herself in the Ceylon theater scene while there under the guidance of Professor E. F. C. Ludowyk; she also became a proficient dancer with lessons from Chitrasena.

She was the first student to study drama at the Royal Academy of Dramatic Art in London and the Bristol Old Vic Theatre School under the guidance of Professor Ludowyk. She eventually graduated with an arts degree and traveled to London with letters of recommendation from Ludowyk following a marriage to Professor Dissanayake (they divorced some time later). There, with the help of actresses Flora Robson and Sybil Thorndike, Meedeniya attended Bristol Old Vic Theatre School for a year and the London School of Speech Training and Dramatic Art for two years.

She was first married to a contemporary student at the university and later became a specialist dentist, Professor S. B. Dissanayake. That marriage did not last long. She was then married to fellow actor Winston Serasinghe, during playing English stage plays. There was a 17 year age gap between the two. Winston had appeared in Rekava and some other productions with her. The couple had two sons: Ravi & Ranjit. Her son Ravi died by an accident at the age of 31. Her husband Winston died in 1999.

== Career ==
Returning to Sri Lanka, Meedeniya met up with Ludowyk and Austrian Jew director Neuman Jubal and got back into theater. The Lionel Wendt Art Centre theater portion of the center opened on 12 December 1953 with the production of Maxim Gorky's "The Lower Depths", starring Iranganie Serasinghe and produced by Neuman Jubal. Doing mainly English roles at first, she started playing in Sinhala theater in Henry Jayasena's Apata Puthe Magak Nethe and followed with roles in Damma Jagoda's Sinhala version of A Streetcar Named Desire, Ves Muhunu, and Porisadaya. The following years saw Meedeniya in constantly changing settings–teaching briefly at Musaeus College, working for The Times of Ceylon after returning from London, doing a stint at the SLBC and handling a post in the tourist trade working as a junior executive and guide of Walkers Tours and Travels (Pvt)Ltd. Accordingly, Serasinghe is the first Sri Lankan actress to have received an academic training in acting.

Meedeniya started her career in cinema in Lester James Peries "Be Safe or Be Sorry" for the Government Film Unit. Peries subsequently cast her in his debut feature film Rekava as a mother, 'Kathirinahamy'. In 1956, she won the Deepashikha Award for Best Actress for her debut performance in the film. With the new surname, Iranganie Serasinghe achieved fame as an actress appearing in many of Peries' early works. Later she won the Sarasaviya Award for Best Supporting Actress for her performance in the film Sagarayak Meda in 1982. Her next notable character came through the film Sudu Sewaneli directed by Sunil Ariyaratne where she played the character of a poor old mother. In 2000, she won the Presidential Award for Best Supporting Actress for this role. In 2021, she was honored with lifetime achievement award during the ceremony held for 21 artists who made an invaluable contribution to Sinhala cinema in the early decades of Sinhala Cinema.

== Beyond Drama ==
Prior to entering the film industry, she was the editor-in-chief of the Times of Ceylon. As a revolutionary political figure, Iranganie was a communist militant at university. As a result, Peter Kehnemann, Bernard Zoysa, and Doric de Souza became active in politics at a time when Colvin R. De Silva has repeatedly invited her to contest a seat from the Lanka Sama Samaja Party.

== National Awards ==
- Kala Keerthi - Sri Lankan Government
- Sri Lankan of the Year (2017) - Entertainment Distinguished Achievement - Ada Derana
- Best actress Special jury award - State Radio Awards 2019

== Biography ==
- Irangani as Told to Kumar de Silva - by Kumar de Silva
- අයිරාංගනී - Sinhala version by same author.

== Filmography ==
=== Film ===
Key
†	Denotes films that have not yet been released

Year	Show	Role	Ref.
1956	Rekava	Karthina	
1960	Sandesaya	Female Spy	
1966	Delovak Athara	Nissanka's mother	
1967	The Yellow Dress		
1969	Bakmaha Deege	Kumarihami	
1969	Romeo Juliet Kathawak		
1970	Thewatha		
1970	Priyanga		
1974	The God King	Varuni	
1981	Sagarayak Meda		
1982	Deveni Gamana	Saman's mother	
1984	Indiana Jones and the Temple of Doom	Village Woman	
1984	Dadayama	Brothel owner	
1984	Avurududa	Malani's Mother	
1985	Adara Kathawa)	Kanthi's mother	
1990	Awaragira	Dingiri Menike	
1996	Loku Duwa	Punna's Mother	
1998	Iqbal (Italy)	Nonna	
2001	Poronduwa	Mrs. Rambukwella	
2001	Kinihiriya Mal	Sylvia Madam	
2002	Sudu Sevanali		
2002	Mansion by the Lake	Aunt Catherine	
2003	Sakman Maluwa	Tissa;s mother	
2003	Irasma	Ima's granny	
2005	Pawana Ralu Viya	Mrs. Weerasinghe	
2005	Sudu Kalu Saha Alu	Nogo Nonna	
2005	Water	Mother in Law	
2007	Nisala Gira	Radha's mother-in-law	
2007	Samaara	Indu's paternal granny	
2008	Heart FM	Shakya's granny	
2008	Rosa Kale	Akalanka's granny	
2013	Abhinikmana	Buddhadasa's mother	
2013	It’s a Matter of Love	Chathuri's granny	
2014	Kalpanthe Sihinayak	Menu's elder mother	
2016	Tradition (film)	Grand Ma	
2017	Paha Samath	Vinura's granny	
2018	Vaishnavee	Osanda's granny	
2018	Kalu Hima	Chunda's granny	
2019	Sulanga Apa Ragena Yavi	Granny	
2022	CineMa		
2023	Guththila		
2022	Gaadi	Bulathgama Disawe's mother	
2024	Minnu		
2025	Theja		

=== Television ===
Year	Show	Role
1980s	Yashorawaya (යශෝරාවය)	Suduhamine
1990–1995	Doo Daruwo (දූ දරුවෝ)	Dulsey/Sudu aachchi
1988	Village by the Sea-Gamperaliya	
1996–1997	Nadayo	
1997	Ammai Thaththai (අම්මයි තාත්තයි)	
1999–2001	Sathpuravesiyo (සත්පුරවැසියෝ)	
2000	Smarana Samapthi	
2001	Suseta Mayam	
2003/04	Paaradeesaya	
2004	Vihanga Geethaya	
2004	Jeewithayata Idadenna	
2004	Nonimi Yathra	
2005	Dangayanta Pamanai	
2006	Mage Kaviya Mata Denna	
2006	Veeduru Mal	
2007	Samanala Wasanthaya	
2007	Weten Eha	
2009	Sudu Hansayo	
2008–2009	Muthu Kirilli	
2010	Doratu Rakinno	
2010–2011	Amanda	granny
2012	Duwaru	
2018	Thaththa	Prison officer's step mother
2020	Sihini	A rich bed-ridden old lady - isolated by her children
