= D. B. Nihalsinghe =

Sri Lankan filmmaker

D. B. Nihalsinghe ඩී. බී. නිහාල්සිංහ
- Born: Diongu Badaturuge Nihalsingha; May 27, 1939
- Died: April 21, 2016 (aged 76)
- Education: Ananda college
- Alma mater: University of South Australia; Norwich University; University of Ceylon
- Occupations: Director; cinematographer; editor; producer
- Years active: 1964–2016
- Parents: D. B. Dhanapala (father); Rathi Dhanapala (mother)

Dr. Diongu Badaturuge Nihalsingha (known as D. B. Nihalsinghe, 27 May 1939 – 21 April 2016) was an accomplished Sri Lankan film director, cinematographer, editor, producer. He was noted for his versatility : as a film cameraman, as a film director, as a (pioneering) television director, as an administrator, and as a teacher. He is a pioneer who introduced professional television production to Sri Lanka (in 1979), commencing with Sri Lanka's and South Asia's first color teledrama, Dimuthu Muthu. He was the founding Chief Executive Officer and General Manager of Sri Lanka's National Film Corporation and a distinguished alumni of the then University of Ceylon, Peradeniya (presently University of Peradeniya). He is the only Sri Lankan who has been conferred Life Fellowship of the Society of Motion picture and Television Engineers USA, the oldest film organisation in the world, established in 1915. The Society determines film and television standards worldwide.

His best known work is Welikathara, Sri Lanka's first and South Asia's second Cinemascope film, included as among the ten best Sri Lankan films awarded the Sri Lanka Presidential award, while Maldeniye Simiyon is also noted for the award for its actress Anoja Weerasinghe as Best Actress at the 16th New Delhi International Film Festival. Two more of his films, Ridei Nimanaya and Kelimadala are also noteworthy, with the latter winning the highest number of national awards at that time. He is also notable for being the pioneer with first ever degree for TV and cinema degree from the University of Kelaniya.

== Biography ==
=== Early life ===
Nihalsinghe was an accomplished student leader as Head Prefect and as Sergeant of the cadet platoon at Ananda college and originally hoped to join the army. By the time he left school he had become more interested in film. As a present for completing the SSC examination, Nihalsinghe's father veteran journalist D.B Dhanapala presented him with a 16mm Bolex cine camera.

Nihalsingha entered the University of Ceylon at Peradeniya and read for a degree in Economics. While at the University he did the camera work for the first documentary to be made by University students, "Niyanada Rata", directed by a student K.K.L de Silva.

After leaving the University, Nihalsingha got an opportunity to enter the film field when a friend of his father offered him a job as a cameraman for the Australian Broadcasting Corporation in Colombo which he took. In 1965 he was offered a post with Hearst Metrotone News on the weekly newsreel, Metro News for the Military Assistance Command in Vietnam.

=== Film career ===
On his return to Sri Lanka, Nihalsinghe was asked to be cameraman and editor of Sath Samudura. He brought to the film a fluid newsreel look, (a total departure from the Indian studio style camera work) hand-holding the 35mm Arriflex film camera- a point which was noted by reviewers. He is famous for the first teledrama in Sri Lanka, Dimuthu muthu.

Nihalsingha received the Cardiff Commonwealth Film Festival award for his first film Bakhti. In 1971, he made the groundbreaking Welikathara in cinemascope. "Welikathara" was South Asia's second CinemaScope film and Sri Lanka's first. Maldeniye Simiyon (1986) won star Anoja Weerasinghe the 'Silver Peacock' as the Best Actress at the 11th Delhi International Film Festival, 1987. Kelimadala (1992) won a dozen awards at the Sarasaviya film festival. Ridi Nimnaya (1982) starred Sanath Gunatileke.

=== Industry work ===
After graduating from the University of Ceylon with a degree in Economics, Nihalsingha began his career, winning the Most Promising Filmmaker award for his documentary Bhakthi at the Cardiff International Film Festival in 1965. He then began as a newsreel cameraman for Hearst Metrotone News, the US-based weekly global newsreel, in 1965. He was sent to Vietnam attached to the Military Assistance Command, Vietnam (MAC-V) to cover war-related work for the NEWS of the DAY weekly global newsreel. Returning to Sri Lanka, he began a career in film encompassing documentary and feature films beginning as cameraman and editor of Sath Samudura, (Nuwan Nayanajith in Nihalsingha:The Pioneering Third Eye) as a milestone in Sri Lankan cinema. His fluid camera work in this film, originating from his newsreel experience, was widely recognised as fresh in an industry where massive Mitchell Indian-style immobile camera work was the norm.

At the age of 29, Nihalsingha became the youngest person to hold the post of Director of the Ceylon Government Film Unit, succeeding George Wicremasinghe (who was its first Sri Lankan Director). The Government Film Unit is the one institution with continuity whose productions have won the highest number of international awards for its documentaries.

Besides invigorating documentary film production, he was instrumental in introducing 35 mm still film to Sri Lanka to replace 120 film when he was asked to oversee the photographic aspects of the National Identity Card project. Using Practica cameras gifted by the (then) East Germany and amid much opposition of photographers, he managed to win them over and thereby establish 35 mm still film as the staple of Sri Lankan still photography until that was overtaken by digital photography.

Nihalsingha's skill as film administrator was best seen in the work he did as founding CEO and general manager of the State Film Corporation from 1972 to 1978. To offset foreign domination of Sri Lankan theatres (80 percent), Nihalsingha launched a series of initiatives which unleashed the suppressed demand for domestically produced films. The initiatives resulted in audience surging from 30 million a year in annual attendances in 1971 to an unprecedented 74.4 million by 1979. The domestic film share of screen time went up from 20% in 1971 to 58% in 1979.( Committee of Inquiry Report, 1985; Committee Report 1997)

== Awards ==
Nihalsingha was awarded the Sri Lankan national honour of KalaKeerthi for his lifetime contribution to Sri Lankan film and television while the Society of Motion Picture and Television Engineers of America (SMPTE) made him a Fellow and later, Life Fellow in 2004 for "achieving outstanding rank among engineers and administrators in motion pictures and television by proficiency and contributions." He was the only Fellow of the SMPTE in Sri Lanka and South Asia. SMPTE is the oldest film and television body in the world, formed in 1915 in New York. It determines motion picture and television standards.

British Kinematograph, Sound and Television Society also made him a Fellow of the society in recognition of lifetime services to film and television in Sri Lanka and South Asia for "the development of film and television production techniques" which included pioneering professional color television production in South Asia in 1979.

In 1979, Nihalsingha left the State Film Corporation and formed the Tele-Cine Limited with the help of Hemasiri Premawarne and Chandra Seneviratne. Tele-Cine Ltd was South Asia's and Sri Lanka's pioneer in professional color television production of television drama, commercials, musicals and documentary. As CEO of Tele-Cine for 16 years, Nihalsingha directed and pioneered the first television drama series in South Asia, Dimuthu Muthu, starring Devika Mihirani and Amarasiri Kanlansooriya. He later went on to direct several pioneering tele-drama series, creating the template for tele-drama production and training and introducing technical personnel in a context where there were none. This is a legacy which lasts to this day in Sri Lanka.

In 1995, Nihalsingha resigned from TCL in 1994 when he was invited to join Television Broadcast (Overseas) Limited in Hong Kong. He was sent to Malaysia's ASTRO as its general manager of Film and Television Production and later, in 2003, as its Executive Director of Feature Film Production. In Kuala Lumpur, Nihalsingha trained several hundred Malaysian young people in all facets of film and television production.

He returned to Sri Lanka in early 2006 and was active in migration of film to digital and television migration to digital.

Besides a BA in Economics from the University of Ceylon, Peradeniya, Nihalsingha has an MA in Film Studies from the Norwich University, Vermont, USA and a PhD in Public Enterprises from the University of South Australia in Adelaide.

== Filmography ==
Year	Film	Ref.
1971	Welikathara	
1982	Ridee Nimnaya	
1986	Maldeniye Simiyon	
1991	Kelimadala	

== Cinematography ==
Year	Film	Ref.
1967	Sath Samudura	
1968	Dahasak Sithuvili	
1969	Binaramali	
1969	Paara Walalu	
1971	Welikathara	
1982	Kele Mal	
1983	Muhudu Lihini	
1986	Maldeniye Simiyon	
