= Rashmi (film) =

2022 Sri Lankan film

- promotional poster
- Sinhala: රශ්මි
- Directed by: Preethiraj Weeraratne
- Written by: Preethiraj Weeraratne
- Produced by: Preethiraj Weeraratne
- Cinematography: Kularuwan Gamage
- Edited by: Dilan Gunawardena
- Music by: Iraj Weeraratne
- Distributed by: EAP Theatres
- Release date: March 18, 2022
- Country: Sri Lanka
- Language: Sinhala

Rashmi (Sinhala: රශ්මි) is a 2022 Sri Lankan Sinhala action comedy film directed and produced by Preethiraj Weeraratne. The film stars Upeksha Swarnamali, Pubudu Chathuranga, and Akalanka Ganegama in lead roles with Jayasekara Aponso, Lucky Dias, and Duleeka Marapana in supporting roles. It is the last film to be screened before the death of veteran actor Wilson Karu. The cameo appearances of the film done by Mahendra Perera, Susila Kottage, Manel Wanaguru, Manel Chandralatha, Miyuri Samarasinghe, and Ruwanthi Mangala.

== Plot ==
The film revolves around a woman called Rashmi who had a salon. She found her daily expenses from this small business. She is married to Amal who is a playboy. Due to this, Amal did not pay much attention to Rashmi. Rashmi did not get the love he wanted. Meanwhile, Rashmi meets a young man named Akash, a journalist by profession as well as a novelist. Rashmi loves Akash because she received love from him that she did not get from Amal where the story twists between their worlds.

== Cast ==
- Upeksha Swarnamali as Rashmi
- Pubudu Chathuranga as Amal
- Akalanka Ganegama as Akash Seneviratne
- Lucky Dias
- Rajitha Hiran
- Cletus Mendis
- Wimal Kumara de Costa
- Jayasekara Aponso as Mr. Maannakkara
- Wilson Karu
- Duleeka Marapana as Pearl, Maannakkara's wife
- Teddy Vidyalankara
- Ruwanthi Mangala
- Srimal Wedisinghe as Minister
- Anusha Rajapaksa
- Nethu Priyangika
- Lakshika Jayawardena
- Sanka Prasad
- Keerthi Ranjith Peiris

== Production ==
The film marked the sixth film production and second cinema direction of Preethiraj Weeraratne after 2019 film Thiththa Aththa. However the production schedule was completed in 2013. Ranjan Saliya's very popular song 'Sil Bidagaththe' sung to the music of Iraj Weeraratne with Samitha Mudunkotuwa is also included in this film. The songs have been composed by Wasantha Dukgannarala. Kularuwan Gamage is the cinematographer, Dilan Gunawardena is the color coordinator and editor, Sithum Sanjeewa and Suresh Kumarasinghe are the assistant editors. Sarath Ranaweera contributed to the script, Kanishka Bandara Meghasuriya, Heshan Miyuranga Kodagoda and Ranjana Premaratne co-produced the art direction and Rishini Weeraratne contributed to production assistance. Production as well as directing the dialogue and script were done by director himself.

== Release ==
The film was released on 18 March 2022 in many village level cinemas. The film marked 50 days of screening in 4 May 2022. According to the director, forty-five per cent of the production revenue from the screening was to be spent on the maintenance of cinemas and another two and a half per cent on the economically disadvantaged artists who worked with him so far.
