= Gratien Ananda =

Sri Lankan singer

Greshan Ananda ග්‍රේෂන් ආනන්ද
- Born: Bajjala Walawwe Gretien Ananda Abeykoon; 15 March 1957; Tangalle, Hambantota
- Died: 29 December 2010 (aged 53); National Hospital of Sri Lanka, Colombo
- Education: St.Mathew College Dematagoda; Saint Joseph's College, Colombo
- Occupations: Singer, player, composer and lyricist
- Spouse: Srima Abeykoon
- Children: 2
- Musical career
- Genres: Pop; soul; rhythm and blues; Indian classical music
- Instruments: Vocals, guitar
- Years active: 1976–2009
- Labels: MEntertainments; Nilwala; Torana; Ransilu

Bajjala Walawwe Gretien Ananda Abeykoon (Sinhala: ග්‍රේෂන් ආනන්ද; 15 March 1957 – 29 December 2010), also as Gration Ananda or Greshan Ananda, was a Sri Lankan singer, composer, songwriter and a lyricist. Considered as the best Sinhalese film score musician to have emerged in the country since the veteran artist the Late H.R. Jothipala, Ananda sang for more than 400 films with a musical career that spanned nearly three decades.

He died at the age of 53 while receiving treatments at National Hospital of Sri Lanka, Colombo.

== Personal life ==
He was born on 15 March 1957 to a family immersed in music. His father Bajjala Walawwe Shelton Abeykoon was a police officer and mother Bernadette Bernadine Jayawardena Amadoru, was a music teacher and a pianist. His grand father Brigadier Charley Jayawardena Amador was a renowned musician who served in the British Army. He spent his early childhood in Kandy, after he moved to hometown Tangalle for primary education. The family had to move frequently as the father's job was transferred from time to time, where he attended to as many as 10 schools. He first went to Little Flower Convent in Tangalle and then to St.Mathew College Dematagoda. Then he completed Advanced Level Examination from Saint Joseph's College, Colombo.

He was a devoted Catholic, where he never missed a Tuesday mass at St Anthony's Church, Kochchikade in Colombo. He polished his music ability as a chorister of All Saints' Church in Borella by Reverend Father John Herath OMI.

As a result of a romantic relationship, Ananda married his longtime partner Srima Abeykoon on January 11, 1985, at St. Cecilia's Church, Colombo. The couple has one daughter, Dulanjalee Chathurya and one son, Mario Angelo. His son Mario Ananda was born on 12 May 1991 and completed education from father's school, St.Joseph College. He started music career after Gratien's death to continue his legacy. In October 2020, his daughter Dulanjali released her maiden song Nidahase with a music video.

== Career ==
=== As a singer ===
His music education took place in his own home, since his mother was a music teacher, he was able to associate various musical instruments at his home. When he turns five, he will be able to play the mouth organ wonderfully. Ananda started to play mouth organ since the age of 3. His music ability was first identified by school music teacher Rev.Father John Herath, where Ananda started to play trumpet and then keyboard. He practiced piano under Lal Perera and Claud Fernando. Then he graduated from Royal College of Music, London with a Diploma in Western Music.

In 1976, Ananda started to play under different bands most notably Stanley Perera's Fortunes, which became his turning point. During that time, he met musician Sarath Dassanayake and joined his orchestra to play guitar. Within the orchestra, his first played the guitar for H.R. Jothipala's Taj Mahalak song. With his extreme musical talent, he was elevated to the position of Assistant Music Director in the orchestra. Under Sarath Dasanayake and Mervin Perera, he started to learn classical Eastern Music.

Later, he worked as the Lead guitarist for many bands including Dreamers, Earnest and the Combo, Superset and Seac for many years. He was also invited to play as a guitarist for Victor Rathnayake's SA Concert. Sanath Gunathilaka was the most successful actor to match Gretien's voice. Ananda first rendered his voice to Gunathilaka's acting in Yasapalitha Nanayakkara's Newatha Hamuwemu. Since then, the Sanath-Greshan combination has created a huge number of film songs. It is also significant that all of these songs are extremely popular.

He released his first cassette in 1978. Ananda was able to sing together with Neela Wickramasinghe for a disc in 1978. His first LP Record contained four songs and all songs had been composed musically by Gration himself. With that song Atha Duraka Detha Pawela, Ananda was invited to sing as a playback singer for films. His maiden playback singing came through Sena Samarasinghe's film Mal Kekulu through the duet Bindu Bindu Kandulu Gala with Shyami Fonseka. After the film, he continued his enormous contribution to Sinhala cinema, where he sang for more than 400 films.

In 2004, he celebrated 25 years in music with a concert Ananda Rathriya at the BMICH on 25 September at 6.00 pm. The DVD of the concert was released in 2005 with the brand Torana Music Box. The DVD comprises 20 popular songs sung by Ananda.

His final song album was Desithaka Gee produced in year 2007 with 12 new songs. In 2009, he launched a CD at the Namel Malini Punchi Theatre on 14 February at 9 am. The CD comprises 23 songs sung at Ananda Rathriya and his son Mario also launched Gayana Gayum made up of 16 tracks on the same day.

=== Music direction ===
He started to compose music for songs Etha Duraka Etha Pawela by himself and Neela Wickramasinghe and Tedini Viraja by Edward Jayakody. Both songs became popular hits, where K.A.W Perera invited Ananda to direct music for his film Durga. With that film, he directed music for about 16 films such as Dhawala Pushpaya, Randenigala Singhaya, Sinha Patawu, Hai Master and Hitha Honda Gaheniyak.

He also composed music for television serials. His first tele-drama music came through Gamana and Premada Weadi, both by K.A.W Perera.

=== As a lyricist ===
Ananda composed melodies for his fellow artistes, some of them became very popular. Some of his lyrics include Mage Punchi Kumari and Mage Athita Diviya (Wrote by great actor Sanath Gunathilake) for Milton Mallawarachchi, Aradhana Nethu Chaya and Sudu Rosa Mal for Priya Suriyasena, Mangalle Mal for Chandralekha Perera, Sandalatha for Sanath Nandasiri.

== Legacy ==
- For his enormous contribution to Sri Lankan cinema and music industry, he was awarded with a special award by the Pope Benedict in Vatican City in 2006.
- Sarasaviya Award for the Best Film Director 1988 – nominated (Durga).
- Sarasaviya Award for the Best Male Vocalist 1994 – won (Raja-Daruwo).
- Sarasaviya Award for the Best Male Vocalist 2007 – won (Anjalika).
- OCIC SIGNEES International Award – won (for contribution to Sri Lankan field of Art).

== Illness and death ==
On 22 December 2010, Ananda was hospitalized to receive treatments for a number of illnesses including liver failure.

In December 2010, Ananda died at the age of 53 while taking medical assistance at the Colombo National Hospital. He was cremated at the Borella Cemetery. Hospital confirmed that, he died at 6.45 am while receiving treatment at the Intensive Care Unit (ICU).

== Playback singing filmography ==
Year	Film
1988	Durga
1989	Randenigala Sinhaya
1994	Dhawala Pushpaya
1996	Hitha Honda Gahaniyak
1980	Mal Kekulu
1982	Bicycale
1982	Thani Tharuwa
1982	Newatha Hamuwemu
1983	Chandira
1983	Athin Athata
1983	Samanala Sihina
1984	Hitha Honda Kollek
1984	Sasara Chethana
1984	Jaya Sikurui
1985	Rajina
1985	Aya Waradida Oba Kiyanna
1985	Rosy
1985	Varsity Kella
1986	Prarthana
1986	Dushyanthi
1986	Jaya Apatai
1986	Soora Saradiyel
1986	Dinuma
1987	Thaththi Man Adarei
1987	Yukthiyada Shakthiyada
1987	Raja Wadakarayo
1987	Randamwal
1987	Obatai Priye Adare
1988	Rasa Rahasak
1988	Nawa Gilunath Ban Chun
1988	Satana
1988	Newatha Api Ekwemu
1989	Mamai Raja
1989	Okkoma Rajawaru
1989	Nommara 17
1990	Dase Mal Pipila
1990	Thanha Asha
1990	Jaya Shakthi
1990	Yukthiyata Wada
1990	Dedunnen Samanaliyak
1990	Weera Udara
1990	Hodin Naththam Narakin
1990	Pem Rajadahana
1990	Madu Sihina
1990	Chandi Raja
1990	Honda Honda Sellam
1990	Wana Bambara
1991	Uthura Dakuna
1991	Paradise
1991	Wada Barinam Wadak Na
1991	Sihina Ahase Wasanthe
1991	Obata Pamanai Adare
1991	Asai Bayai
1991	Raja Sellan
1991	Salambak Handai
1991	Ran Hadawatha
1991	Cheriyo Doctor
1991	Dhanaya
1991	Suwadena Suwadak
1992	Ranabime Weeraya
1992	Sakwithi Raja
1992	Sakkara Sooththara
1992	Sinha Raja
1992	Kiyala Wadak Na
1992	Umayangana
1992	Oba Mata Wiswasai
1992	Suranimala
1992	Sathya
1992	Sinhayangeth Sinhaya
1993	Chaya
1993	Sargent Nallathambi
1993	Sasara Sarisarana Thek Oba Mage
1993	Come o Go Chicago
1993	Yasasa
1993	Bambadara Bisaw
1993	Sandareka
1993	Lassanai Balanna
1993	Lagin Giyoth Ahak Na
1993	Soora Weera Chandiyo
1994	Rajawansen Ekek
1994	Abhiyogaya
1994	Sujatha
1994	Mawubime Weerayo
1994	150 Mulleriyawa
1994	Hello My Darling
1995	Wasana Wewa
1995	Vijay Saha Ajay
1995	Ira Handa Illa
1995	Pudumai Eth Aththai
1995	Wairayen Wairaya
1995	Demodara Palama
1995	Chandiyage Putha
1995	Age Wairaya
1995	Cheriyo Captain
1996	Mana Mohini
1996	Hiru Sanduta Madiwee
1996	Mal Hathai
1996	Cheriyo Darling
1996	Bawa Sasara
1997	Soorayo Wadakarayo
1997	Ramba Saha Madhu
1997	Apaye Thappara 84000k
1997	Raththaran Minihek
1998	Yudha Gini Meda
1998	Re Daniel Dawal Migel
1998	Sathutai Kirula Ape
1998	Girl Friend
1999	Ayadimi Sama
1999	Koti Sana
1999	Seetha Samire
1999	Nagaran
2000	Danduwama
2000	Thisarawi
2000	Jack And Jill
2001	Oba Koheda Priye
2001	Wasanthaye Kunatuwak
2001	Dinuma Kageda
2001	Rosa Wasanthe
2002	Seethala Gini Kandu
2002	Kamasuthra
2002	Magul Sakwala
2002	Jolly Halo 2
2002	Somy Boys
2003	Vala in London
2004	Diya Yata Gindara
2004	Sumedha
2004	Left Right Sir
2006	Dedunu Wassa
2006	Samaara
2006	Anjalika
2006	Double Game
2007	Weda Beri Tarzan
2007	Hai Master
2008	Rosa Diganthe
2008	Ai Oba Thaniwela
2009	Juliya
2009	Sinasuna Adaren
2010	Mago Digo Dai
2015	Sanjana

== Track listing ==
No.	Song	Film	Accompany singers
1	Semata Pihitawana	Re Daniel Dawal Migel	Nuwan Gunawardana and Champa Kalhari
2	Mal Mal Sihinaya	Re Daniel Dawal Migel	Nuwan Gunawardana and Champa Kalhari
3	Maa Rahasin Amatha	Re Daniel Dawal Migel	Latha Walpola
4	Wennati Oba Edath Pemwathi	Numba Nadan Apita Pissu	Uresha Ravihari
5	Adara Wassak	Numba Nadan Apita Pissu	Uresha Ravihari
6	Pemkala Chamara Sala Sala	Numba Nadan Apita Pissu	Uresha Ravihari
7	Getapichcha Suwandata	Seethala Gini Kandu	Chandrika Siriwardena
8	Heda Pennuwe Raja Wani	Seethala Gini Kandu	Victor Vijayantha, Walter Fernando, Maya Damayanthi, Susil Perera
9	Dewathi Dewa	Nommara 17	Angeline Gunathilake
10	Meda Sale Bandanne	Nommara 17	Vijaya Kumaratunga, Angeline Gunathilake
11	Handa Wage Handa Mage	Vala In London	Uresha Ravihari
12	Ninden Sihinen	Vala In London	Uresha Ravihari
13	Sanda Wathure Ran Tharaka	Ai Oba Thaniwela	Milton Mallawarachchi, Latha Walpola, W. Premaratne
14	Dan Dan Munen	Ai Oba Thaniwela	Milton Mallawarachchi, Latha Walpola, Malini Bulathsinhala
15	Seetha Meedume Seetha Sakwale	Koti Sana	Nirosha Virajini
16	Ahase Meedum Duhul Walaa	Oba Koheda Priye	Latha Walpola

== Solo tracks ==
1. Adara Seenuwa
2. Adari Sagari Ma Hade Mandire
3. Akasha Gangawe Pawee Gena
4. Anupama Senehe
5. Bale Punchi Kale Wage
6. Bindu Bindu Kandulu Gala
7. Chandana Allen Nala (Originally sung by H.R. Jothipala)
8. Datha Dilena Bandi Walalu
9. Dathe Ran Muthu
10. Dawadi Thilina Ran Mini Muthu
11. Deege Bara Bage
12. Didulana Podi Ran Tharuwak
13. Dilidune Daruwane
14. Ea Geetha Rawe
15. Ea Kale Wage Na Adare
16. Eeye Men Oba
17. Ganga Nadiye Hamuwu
18. Gangule Iwure
19. Gata Pichcha Suwandata
20. Geetha Gaya (Supem Pa)
21. Hama Hawasaka Ma
22. Hawasata Paya
23. Hima Kandu Yahane
24. His Veedo Bandun
25. Hithumathe Jeewithe
26. Jayasri We Kumariye
27. Jeewithayata Maga Penwa
28. Kalaya Galana Me Nadiye
29. Kawadada Hitha Hinahenne
30. Kowula Kohedo (his last song)
31. Kreedakayo Tharagaye Yedena
32. Kumariye Oba Langa Ma
33. Lassana Midule
34. Ma Awe Pawasannai
35. Ma Dayabara Priyawiye (Originally sung by Milton Mallawarachchi)
36. Ma Ha Ae Suratha Dara
37. Ma Upanna Deshayai
38. Mage Jeewithaye Pa Sandu Se
39. Mage Loke Sihine Oba We
40. Mahada Sanasu Preme
41. Mal Sinaha Pawe (I Love You)
42. Mama Raga Thala
43. Mangalle Mal Mala Dala
44. Maranaye Dora Aree
45. Mayawa Randawu Sinawe
46. Me Punchi Hithakata
47. Me Seetha Ra Yamaye
48. Mee Bindu Gala Gala Thibunu
49. Minisiyawe Mahima Thawa
50. Mulu Lowa Mawitha Kalo
51. Muwa Hasaral Mawuye
52. Nawa Aare As Bandum Enne
53. Nethu Piya Wasa
54. Pata Pata Suwanda Hamana
55. Pera Wasanthaya
56. Pin Pata Pipi Mala
57. Punchi Punchi Punchi Patawune Ma
58. Ra Thun Yame Palu
59. Raja Madure Ipadeela
60. Rallen Ralla Wellen Wella
61. Ranin Mala
62. Rayak Dawalak Nopeni Nodani
63. Sammani Duwani
64. Sanda Langa Danga Kala
65. Sanda Se Nisha Thalawe
66. Sanda Seethalada
67. Sanda Yame Paya Tharu Uyane
68. Sandu Sagawela
69. Sangawee Yannata Bari Wu
70. Sara Sande Sina Sele (Originally sung by H.R. Jothipala)
71. Sathutin Nidalle
72. Senehasa Pibidi
73. Senehe Irak Patha
74. Sihina Ahase Wasanthe (solo slow)
75. Sihinayaki Jeewithe
76. Sihiniga Nalawenna
77. Sithata Ganna Wera Wadanna
78. Sithehi Yamak Nam
79. Sithumi Duwe Visura Puthe
80. Snehaye Handa Jesuni
81. Sonduru Rayaka Yame
82. Suhada Madura Preme
83. Sunil Wala Salu Pili Patala (Originally sung by H.R. Jothipala)
84. Sura Anganawo Ra Ahase Paya
85. Sura Lowa Madale Geetha Gayanne
86. Tharu Yaye Athin Athata
87. Tharuwak Pipi Ra
88. Vil Jale Pipena Nelumata
89. Wareka Sada Sulagak Wagei

== Duets ==
1. Ada Nathuwada Awi Mana – with Anjalin Gunathilaka
2. Ada Vinode Sapa Soyala – with Anjalin Gunathilaka
3. Adara Geetha Gayala – with Kalawathee
4. Adare Nam Pothe – with Champa Kalhari
5. Adaredo Dasin Pawasa Giye – with Shyami Fonseka
6. Al Hene Pal Rakiddi – with G.S.B. Rani Perera
7. Ananda We Jeewithe – with Nathasha Perera
8. Amma Amma - with Milton Mallawarachchi
9. Ananda Wena - with Milton Mallawarachchi, Latha Walpola and Anjalin Gunathilaka
10. Api Santhosen Inne – with Milton Perera
11. Asha Nura Sanda Paya – with Mariyasel Gunathilaka
12. Ashawe Ashawe Paya – with H.R. Jothipala
13. Atha Duraka Desa Pawela – with Neela Wickramasinghe
14. Awa Awa Adare Soyala – with Chandraleka Perera
15. Ayachana Obe Netha Randu Sithuwame
16. Cheriyo Kiyala Me – with Freddie Silva
17. Dase Obe Senehe Mawewi – with Uresha Ravihari
18. Gee Rasa Denna – with Chandrika Siriwardena
19. Hima Kumariye – with Nathasha Perera
20. Hima Renu Watena – with Latha Walpola
21. Hinahedo Jala Rakusa – with H.R. Jothipala
22. Jeewithe Mal Supipunu Mawathe – with Dayan Witharana
23. La Neela Akashaye – with Anjalin Gunathilaka
24. Ma Ha Lanwela – with Milton Mallawarachchi
25. Ma Mal Kumarayo – with Anjalin Gunathilaka
26. Madura Prema Nimnaye – with Sujatha Aththanayaka
27. Mage Adare Vimane – with Uresha Ravihari
28. Mal Mee Man Math (Ding Dong Oh Baby) – with Chandrika Siriwardena
29. Mal Loke Pavi Pavi Yawi - with Milton Mallawarachchi
30. Mal Muthulel Hiripoda Warusawaka – with Malani Bulathsinhala
31. Mala Gira Jodu Sadi – with Chandraleka Perera
32. Malliye - with H.R. Jothipala
33. Manaliyak Sanda Wage – with Anjalin Gunathilaka
34. Me Gee Sandawe – with Kumari Munasinghe
35. Mey Gangaadhare - with Milton Mallawarachchi and Latha Walpola
36. Nil Nuwan Sandalle – with Nirosha Virajini
37. Nilla Madin Yan Adara – with Maya Damayanthi
38. Nindedi Rathri Sihine – with Chandrika Siriwardena
39. Oba Ewidin - with Uresha Ravihari
40. Obage Denethin Galai Adare – with Latha Walpola
41. Pawee Pawee Seetha Maruthe – with Anjalin Gunathilaka
42. Payana Sanda Kirane – with Latha Walpola
43. Pem Loke Pavi Pavi Yawi – with Milton Mallawarachchi
44. Pipena Male Suwanda Dane – with Latha Walpola
45. Punchi Ranpata Samanalayo – with Nathasha Perera
46. Rosa Mal Wimanaye – with Chandrika Siriwardena
47. Sagare Wageya Mage – with Uresha Ravihari
48. Sansara Gee Rawaye – with Latha Walpola
49. Sihina Lathaviya Sathapena Dase – with Neela Wickramasinghe
50. Sinaha Kandulu – with H.R. Jothipala
51. Sihina Ahase Wasanthe - with H.R. Jothipala and Anjalin Gunathilaka
52. Sudu Muthulal Sihine – with Latha Walpola
53. Thisara Vile – with Samitha Mudunkotuwa
54. Udarata Sinhala Porane – with W.D. Amaradewa
55. Wadath Agei Hadath Penei – with Freddie Silva
