= Freddie Silva =

Sri Lankan actor and singer

Freddie Silva ෆ්‍රෙඩී සිල්වා.
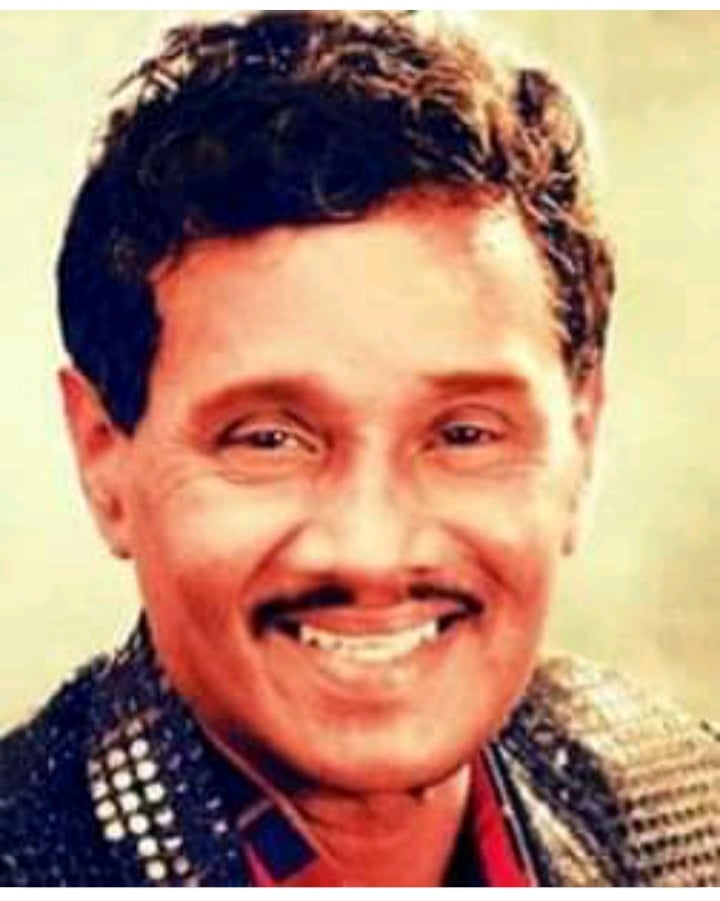
- Born: Haupe Liyanage Athukorala Morris Joseph Ranabahu; May 18, 1938; Puwakaramba, Moratuwa, Sri Lanka
- Died: October 29, 2001 (aged 63); Siddamulla, Piliyandala, Sri Lanka
- Other name: Freddie Silva
- Occupations: Actor, playback singer
- Years active: 1963–2001
- Spouses: Kamala Swarnalatha Perera (divorced) Srimathi Chitra Ranjini Herath (divorced)
- Partner: Manel Chandralatha
- Children: Janesh Silva (Deceased); Chandani Silva; Shashi Praba Subashini; Prageeth Madushanka Silva

Haupe Liyanage Athukorala Morris Joseph Ranabahu (born 18 May 1938 – died 29 October 2001: Sinhala: ෆෙ‍්‍රඩී සිල්වා), popularly known as Freddie Silva, was a Sri Lankan film actor, and playback singer, who appeared from 1963 until 2001. Freddie was known for being one of the most popular Sri Lankan comedians of the 1960s, 1970s and 1980s. He appeared in over 400 films and Produced 2 films, of which 300 were screened at the celebration of fifty years in Sinhala Cinema.

== Early life ==
Silva was born on 18 May 1938 in Puvakaramba, Moratuwa, Sri Lanka as the only child of the family. Silva's father was an overseer for the Moratuwa Urban Council and his mother was a member of Salvation Army. Growing up he was fascinated with singing and dancing. St. Sebastian's College, Moratuwa was his Alma mater.

== Music career ==
In the 1950s Silva performed the Alanson Mendis composition "Bar Bar Bar" in front of Sir John Kotelawala and was warmly received. He used this opportunity to get a letter of recommendation from Kotelawala which he presented to Livy Wijemanne of Radio Ceylon to secure a job as a radio artist.

Silva's first recording was "Mottapala." He followed the song with "Bar Bar Bar" now updated with music by P. L. A. Somapala. It was a success. Subsequent efforts teamed Silva with the late Premakirthi de Alwis. Their work include comedic songs like "Aron Mama", "Pankiritta", "Nedeyo", "Handa Mama", "Kekille Rajjuruwo" and "Parana Coat" (from Lokuma Hinawa). Silva's crowning achievement is considered the tune "Kundumani."

== Acting career ==
Silva got his first screen role through a chance meeting with K. A. W. Perera in 1963. At that time he was living with H. R. Jothipala and Roy de Silva and frequented parties as a guest entertainer. Perera cast Silva in Suhada Sohoyuro alongside L. S. Ramachandran and Vijitha Mallika. He appeared at a dance on the beach singing "Diya Rella Werale Hapi Hapi" with Pushparani and went on to be cast in mainly comedic roles.

The serious side of Silva was seen in Sekaya (1965), Lasanda (1974) and Sukiri kella (1975). In the 1975 film he played a mentally handicapped character and in preparation for the role lived with a real handicapped boy in Koralawella.

By the 1980s, producers were reluctant to make a film without Silva fearing that the movie would flop. He was then living an extravagant life and saved little. In 1989 Silva was awarded the Ranathisara award by leading film weekly Sarasaviya. A turning moment came when his friend Vijaya Kumaratunga (who he appeared alongside in ten films the last being Yukthiyada Shakthiyada) was murdered. He cites this event as leading to the downfall of cinema. Still Silva stayed busy appearing in 15 of the 26 films made in 1992.

== Personal life ==
Freddie Silva was a father of four children from his two marriages to Kamala Swarnalatha Perera and Chithra Herath. His first son Janesh Silva was also an actor and a singer. Freddie's first marriage daughter Chandani Silva is a singer and actress.

Janesh Silva was born on 26 January 1962 and attended to Carey College for studies. He was married to Hemamala and they have one son Janith Silva. Janesh died on June 10, 2012, while he was taking medical treatment for cancer. Janesh Silva is known as a comedian that acted in 10+ films.

Freddie Silva died on 29 October 2001 in Siddamulla at the age of 63.

== Filmography ==
| Year | Film | Role |
|---|---|---|
| 1963 | Suhada Sohoyuro | |
| 1965 | Sepatha Soya | |
| 1966 | Seethala Wathura | |
| 1966 | Mahadena Muththa | |
| 1969 | Paara Walalu | |
| 1970 | Ohoma Hodada | |
| 1971 | Samanala Kumariyo samaga Api Kawadath Soorayo | |
| 1972 | Sujeewa | |
| 1973 | Haddinnath Tharu | Asoka's friend |
| 1973 | Sunethra | Geetharatne |
| 1973 | Dahakin Ekak | |
| 1973 | Hondata Hondai | Komalawathie |
| 1974 | Lasanda | Vijay |
| 1974 | Duleeka | |
| 1974 | Kasthuri Suwanda | Kamal's friend |
| 1974 | Dinum Kanuwa | |
| 1974 | Sheela | Poster affixer / Guru |
| 1974 | Sihasuna | |
| 1974 | Shanthi | |
| 1974 | Jeewana Ganga | |
| 1974 | Unnath Daahai Malath Daahai | |
| 1975 | Obai Mamai | Sirisena |
| 1975 | Sukiri Kella | Pushpananda / Robert Louis Nanapala |
| 1975 | Sadhana | |
| 1975 | Mage Nandi Shyama | |
| 1976 | Hariyata Hari | Chauffeur 'Somapala' |
| 1976 | Rajagedara Paraviyo | |
| 1976 | Kolamba Sanniya | Tarzan |
| 1976 | Haaratha Hathara | |
| 1976 | Aasha | |
| 1976 | Wasana | Martin |
| 1976 | Ran Thilakaa | |
| 1976 | Kauda Raja | Peacock Dancer ("Dine Lanka") |
| 1976 | Adarei Man Adarei | |
| 1977 | Maruwan Samaga Waase | Mudalali store frequenter |
| 1977 | Tom Pachayaa | |
| 1977 | Hithuwakkarayo | |
| 1977 | Siri Madaara | |
| 1977 | Hariyanakota Ohoma Thamai | |
| 1977 | Niluka | |
| 1977 | Chin Chin Nona | |
| 1977 | Saja | |
| 1977 | Sithaka Suwanda | Tintin |
| 1978 | Sasara | |
| 1978 | Maduwanthi | Freddie |
| 1978 | Siripathula | |
| 1978 | Apsara | |
| 1978 | Deepanjali | |
| 1979 | Samanmalee | |
| 1979 | Minisun Athara Minisek | |
| 1979 | Muwan Pelessa | Pina |
| 1979 | Rose Mal Thunak | Flutist |
| 1979 | Akke Mata Awasara | |
| 1979 | Subhani | |
| 1979 | Nuwan Renu | Pabilis |
| 1979 | Wisihathara Peya | |
| 1979 | Hari Pudumai | |
| 1980 | Silva | |
| 1980 | Muwan Pelessa 2 | Pina |
| 1980 | Adara Rathne | Student leader |
| 1981 | Kolam Karayo | Ahanga Lal Sulojana |
| 1981 | Geethika | Silva 'Mahathaya' |
| 1981 | Anjaana | |
| 1981 | Ek Dawasak Ra | Photographer |
| 1981 | Amme Mata Samawenna | Freddie |
| 1982 | Miss Mallika 1982 | |
| 1982 | Wathura Karaththaya | Reporter |
| 1982 | Kadawunu Poronduwa remake | Sewaris 'Unnah' |
| 1983 | Sumithuro | |
| 1983 | Chandi Siriya | |
| 1983 | Sister Mary | Friend |
| 1983 | Hasthi Viyaruwa | Velu |
| 1984 | Ara Soyza | Soyza |
| 1984 | Thaththai Puthai | Silva |
| 1984 | Kakiley Rajjuruwo | Andare |
| 1985 | Araliya Mal | Bandara |
| 1986 | Dinuma | Ustad |
| 1986 | Mal Varusa | Lona |
| 1987 | Yugayen Yugayata | |
| 1987 | Thaththi Man Adarei | |
| 1987 | Yukthiyada Shakthiyada | |
| 1987 | Raja Wedakarayo | Upul 'Music Master' |
| 1987 | Ran Dam Wel | |
| 1987 | Obatai Priye Adare | |
| 1987 | Ahinsa | |
| 1987 | Hitha Honda Chandiya | Serpino |
| 1988 | Newa Gilunath Bandchun | Gira |
| 1988 | Rasa Rahasak | Sena |
| 1988 | Gedara Budun Amma | Minister |
| 1988 | Amme Oba Nisa | |
| 1988 | Angulimaala | |
| 1988 | Durga | |
| 1988 | Satana | |
| 1988 | Newatha Api Ekwemu | |
| 1988 | Chandingeth Chandiya | |
| 1989 | Badulu Kochchiya | |
| 1989 | Mamai Raja | Ranjith's Advisor's son |
| 1989 | Nommara 17 | Potato 'Nommara 13' |
| 1989 | Obata Rahasak Kiyannam | |
| 1989 | Randenigala Sinhaya | Sunny 'Aiyya' |
| 1990 | Sambudu Mahima | |
| 1990 | Dese Mal Pipila | Bandu |
| 1990 | Thanha Aasha | Amadoru |
| 1990 | Dedunnen Samanaliyak | |
| 1990 | Walavuve Haamu | |
| 1990 | Pem Raja Dahana | Guru |
| 1991 | Uthura Dakuna | Alwis |
| 1991 | Paaraadeesaya | |
| 1991 | Bambara Kalape | |
| 1991 | Love In Bangkok | Jackie |
| 1991 | Cheriyo Doctor | Doctor Koko |
| 1992 | Sathya | |
| 1992 | Jaya Siri We Kumariya | |
| 1992 | Kadiraa | |
| 1992 | Kiyala Wadak Na | Jackie |
| 1992 | Malsara Doni | PPL Perera |
| 1992 | Okkoma Kanapita | Don Juan alias Ali baba |
| 1992 | Sinhayageth Sinhaya | Sergeant Jayapala |
| 1993 | Jooriya Mamai | |
| 1993 | Sarjant Nallathambi | |
| 1993 | Surayan Athara Veeraya | Sunil |
| 1993 | Sura Veera Chandiyo | CID Silva |
| 1993 | Prathigna | Sena |
| 1993 | Mewila Penevi Roope | |
| 1994 | Okkoma Hodatai | Bandara Silva alias Himself |
| 1994 | Raja Wansen Ekek | Sunny |
| 1994 | Vijaya Geetha | Dougie "Payan' Jayasuriya |
| 1995 | Inspector Geetha | |
| 1995 | Pudumai Eth Aththai | |
| 1995 | Vairayen Vairaya | |
| 1995 | Cheriyo Captain | Ping Pong |
| 1996 | Sura Daruwo | |
| 1996 | Manamohini | Dougie |
| 1996 | Sihina Vimane Rajakumari | |
| 1996 | Cheriyo Darling | Doctor Coco |
| 1997 | Raagaye Unusuma | |
| 1997 | Soorayo Wedakaarayo | |
| 1999 | Kolompoor | Freddie |
| 2001 | Jolly Hallo | Father |
| 2001 | Oba Koheda Priye | Dulcy |
| 2001 | Pissu Puso | Pachavansa |
| 2002 | Parliament Jokes | Politician |
| 2002 | Pissu Double | Gajadeva |
| 2003 | Vala In London | Charlie |
| 2006 | Supiri Balawatha | Freddie |

=== As producer ===
| Year | Film | Director |
|---|---|---|
| 1994 | Okkoma Hodatai | |

== Songs ==
- Aachchi Podi Wedawarjanayak
- Aappa Weladaamey Umba - with Kalawathee
- Aaraadhitha Amuththek (Vikata Rasaanga) - with Gemunu Wijesuriya
- Aaron Maama
- Aaronge Malli Baaron
- Aawaa Mey Mama - with Anjaleen Gunathilake
- Ahanna Balanna
- Aladinge Puduma Pahana - with Nihal Nelson
- Allapu Gedarin
- Aluth Kathawak
- Aluth Kalaawak
- Amuthu Adum ada
- Anangaya Anangaya - with Anjaleen Gunathilake
- Amuthu Sathaa
- Andare
- Andare Mehe Waren - with Desmond De Silva
- Anna Hande Haawa
- Api Kaatada Baya - with H.R. Jothipala
- Arabiye Thele
- Arulu Burulu
- Ata Sakilla Waage
- Athaka Selawena
- Athadunna Hithawanthi
- Aththa Yukthiyata
- Au Au Au Au Mage Sawarina
- Ayiya Saami - with Kalawathee
- Baanumathi
- Bachna Bachana
- Balla Balla
- Ballan Biruwata
- Ballata Ethiwedakuthne
- Bam Manna
- Bar Eken Beela
- Bara Karaththe
- Batakola Wattiyakata - with Kalawathiee
- Beela Beela
- Blade Thaley
- Bombay Sundaree
- Bola Kadala Seeni Kadala - with Kalawathee
- Boru Manasgaatha Noweyi
- Bulath Wadiyak
- Buruthu Buruthu Mal
- Buuru Naamba
- Chandrase Kelum
- Cheriyo Kiyala Me - with Gration Ananda
- Cheene Indalaa Aawe - with Kalawathee
- Chi Chi Chi
- Chimpanci Putha
- Chin Chin Nona - with H. R. Jothipala and Milton Perera
- Dannawu Rata Pawathenna Wu
- Dawasak Daa Kakuluwekuta
- Deweta Dige Man Awa
- Dil Thadap Thadap (Illagena Kana Parippu)
- Diya Yata Wiskam
- Duka Wanasana Sepa - with Milton Mallawarachchi and M. S. Fernando
- Ekamath Eka Rataka Ea Kale
- Enakota Enawa Hina Wevi (Nadayo)
- Enna Enna Wadiwenna
- Gaha Kola Mal - with H.R Jothipala
- Gaja Labai Nona Mahathune (Pacha)
- Galkisse Muhudu Werale
- Galu Muwadora Pitiye (Dahas Gananakin)
- Ganu Parane Mawwe Deyyo
- Gigiri Jagari Handawana
- Giri Goris
- Handa Mama Udin
- Indi Gaha Yata Wadiwela
- Ipadunu Rata Daya
- Irida Pole Domba Gaha Yata
- Jack Saha Jil
- Kamatha Gawa' - with Nirosha Virajini
- Kaputulanthe Wasiyo
- Kawadawath Na Mehema Deyak
- Kawuda Gona (Oon Maru Hathara Hina)
- Kawuda Me Ane - with Kalawathee
- Kewilige Patiya (Kaputige Kooduwe)
- Lagadi Papai Nondi Jimai
- Lokaya Namathi Game
- Maduruwathi (Keen Koon Hangi Hangi)
- Maha Kaleka Benayaka (Naga Rajaya)
- Maha Kelaye Nuga Sewane (Bakamuna)
- Mamai Motta Pala
- Mame Me Bakamuna - with H.R Jothipala
- Mangala Athupita Sarasi
- Mayam Mawala Pala
- Me Danno Danithi
- Mini Gejji Handana
- My Name Is Saiman Silva
- Naga Rajaya (Maha Kalayaka Benayaka)
- Nandamma Na Nedo - with Srilal Abeykoon
- Nikamma Inna Wadata Adanna (Pin Batha)
- Nitharama Biruwata Ballek
- Oba Raja Weela - with Kalawathee
- Onna Babo Billo Enawa
- Or Mister
- Pana Palayan Labana Sumane
- Pankiriththa
- Parana Coat
- Parawiya Wage Raja Malige
- Pata Sarungal Wagei - with Vijaya Kumaranatunga
- Princy Darling My Sweety
- Raigamayanani Gampolayanani
- Raja Umbane Gona
- Rakinna Kiyala Aran Thibba
- Ran Thatiyaka Kiri Pani Purawala
- Rupiyal Lakshayak Thagi
- Salli Labenakota
- Sando Gundo (Kalayakin Nowa Munagahune)
- Sopinath Ekka Man
- Surangani Surangani
- Thamath Innawa (Vijaya Kuwenila)
- Thangamani - with Kalawathee
- Thea Kude Pite Badan
- Tikiri Kirilliyo
- Topsina Premi Mage
- Upan Dine Langa Ena Hinda
- Vikara Loke Loka Vikare
- Wadath Agei Hadath Penei - with Gration Ananda
- Weda Mahaththaya
- Wella Simbimin Rali Perale
- Yakada Kate - with Anjaleen Gunathilaka
- Yantham Athi
- Yantham English Dana Gaththa
