= Oba Koheda Priye =

2001 film by Hemasiri Sellapperuma

Oba Koheda Priye ඔබ කොහෙද ප්‍රියේ
- Directed by: Hemasiri Sellapperuma
- Written by: Hemasiri Sellapperuma
- Based on: Hemasiri Sellapperuma
- Produced by: Sinhagiri Films
- Starring: Sanath Gunathilake; Sabeetha Perera; Ranjan Ramanayake
- Cinematography: M. H. Gafoor
- Edited by: M. S. Aliman
- Music by: Sarath Dassanayake
- Production companies: Prasad Color Lab; Sarasavi Lab
- Release date: 30 March 2001
- Country: Sri Lanka
- Language: Sinhala

Oba Kohida Priye (Sinhala: ඔබ කොහෙද ප්‍රියේ) is a 2001 Sri Lankan Sinhala action family film directed by Hemasiri Sellapperuma and produced by Sugathadasa Marasinghe for Sinhagiri Films. It stars Sanath Gunathilake and Sabeetha Perera in lead roles along with Ranjan Ramanayake, and Freddie Silva. Music composed by Sarath Dassanayake. It is the 950th Sri Lankan film in the Sinhala cinema.

== Cast ==
- Sanath Gunathilake as George Madanayake
- Sabeetha Perera Dual role as Nilmini, Nimmi
- Ranjan Ramanayake as Priyantha
- Freddie Silva as Dulcy
- Wilson Karunaratne as Wilson
- Bandu Samarasinghe as Princy
- Rex Kodippili as Mr. Madanayake
- Manel Chandralatha
- Teddy Vidyalankara as Teddy

== Soundtrack ==
No.	Title	Singer(s)	Length
1.	"Me Pawan Sale"	Angeline Gunathilake
2.	"Ahase Meedum Duhul Walaa"	Gratien Ananda, Latha Walpola
3.	"Hangado Adare"	Ranjan Ramanayake, Latha Walpola
4.	"Me Geethika Me Yathika"	Latha Walpola
5.	"Gori Bori"	Angeline Gunathilake, Latha Walpola, Freddie Silva, Bandu Samarasinghe
