= Angeline Gunathilake =

Sri Lankan songstress and playback singer (1939–2019)

Angeline Gunathilaka
- ඇන්ජලීන් ගුණතිලක
- Born: Angelina Rachel de Lanerolle; 23 December 1939; Matara, Sri Lanka
- Died: 29 March 2019 (aged 79); National Hospital of Sri Lanka, Colombo
- Education: St. Mary's Convent Matara; St. Thomas' College, Kotte
- Occupations: songstress, playback singer
- Spouse: Leslie Gunathilaka (m. 1966)
- Children: 2
- Musical career
- Genres: Pop; soul; rhythm and blues; Indian classical music
- Instrument: Vocals
- Years active: 1956–2017
- Labels: His Master's Voice; Torana; Evoke

Angeline Rachel de Lanerolle (Sinhala: ඇන්ජලීන් ගුණතිලක; 23 December 1939 – 29 March 2019), popularly known as Angeline Gunathilake, was a Sri Lankan singer, primarily working as a playback singer in Sinhala film industry. Considered the Silver bell of Sinhala cinema, Gunathilaka worked on over 5000 playback songs in a musical career that spanned nearly six decades. She was an A-grade singer who graduated from Sri Lanka Broadcasting Corporation.

She died at the age of 79 while receiving treatment at National Hospital of Sri Lanka, Colombo.

== Personal life ==
Angeline Gunathilaka was born on 23 December 1939 in Matara district, the seventh of ten siblings. She went to St. Mary's Convent Matara for primary education. Her father worked at the Department of Railways. Due to her father's employers transferring him, the family moved to Colombo at the age of 8. She then attended St. Thomas' College, Kotte for secondary education.

She married Leslie Gunathilaka on 29 March 1966. The couple has 2 daughters. Her grandson, Imal Jude Malwattege, pursued a career in music.

On 29 March 2019, Gunathilaka died while receiving treatment at the National Hospital, Colombo. Her final rites were held at the General Cemetery Borella on Tuesday, April 2 at 4 p.m.

== Singing career ==
At the age of 8, Angeline joined the Radio Ceylon amateur program, and secured the second place in a musical talent show. After that, she studied music under maestro Sunil Santha. At the age of 13, she was selected for the Lamapitiya programme conducted by veteran lyricist and broadcaster Karunaratne Abeysekera.

Angeline started her singing career with the solo song Adara Ambare. While she performed on the Lamapitiya program, she attended a singing competition called Tharu Thenuma organized by Sri Murugan New Art Films. She won the competition and was selected for first playback singing. Her debut as a playback singer came with the film Sohoyuro screened in 1958. In the same year, she sang the first duet of her career with Sydney Artigla. She then collaborated with Morris Dahanayake, R. Sivananda and V. Vardaraja for duets. Aside from singing, she studied dance under the maestro Panibharatha.

She rose to prominence within a small period of time, where she met P. L. A. Somapala. He invited Gunathilaka to record songs under His Master's Voice label. She recorded songs with Chitral Somapala and Mohideen Baig for the 2500th Buddha Jayanthi commemoration. Along with Buddhist songs, she worked on many Christmas songs, which she sang together with C.T. Fernando under the influence of Marcelline Jayakody. She continued to gain popularity in the Sri Lankan music industry, where she started to play duets with Wally Bastian. She also sang virindu songs for the film Deyyange Rate.

From 1958 to 1999, Gunathilaka performed as a singer on behalf of many actresses including Leena De Silva, Florida Jayalath, Sandya Kumari, Claris De Silva, Jeevarani Kurukulasuriya, Malani Fonseka, Geetha Kumarasinghe, Soniya Dissanayaka, Shriyani Amarasena, Kanthi Lanka, Sumana Amarasinghe, Fareena Layee, Shrima Koddikara, Sabeetha Perera, Manel Wanaguru, Shriyani Fonseka, Shirani Kurykulasuriya, Anoja Weerasinghe, Swarna Mallawarachchi, Sangeetha Weeraratne, Suvinitha Koongahage, Dilhani Ekanayake, Manel Chandralatha and many more. Gunathilaka gained widespread popularity for a duet with H.R. Jothipala. The two contributed to a vast number of films across many genres. On 9 August 2009, she performed a musical show Angeline Rocks with The Boys at 6.30 pm at the BMICH.

On 23 August 2014, she performed a live concert at Bandaranaike Memorial International Conference Hall.

== Playback singing filmography ==
Angeline Gunathilaka worked on over 200 Sinhala films across six decades.

Year	Film
1958	Sohoyuro
1958	Deiyyange Rate
1958	Daskama
1959	Gehenu Geta
1961	Suvineetha Laalani
1962	Sansare
1962	Suhada Divi Piduma
1963	Wena Swargayak Kumatada
1963	Deepashika
1964	Sobana Sitha
1965	Sweep Ticket
1966	Senasuma Kothanada
1966	Athulweema Thahanam
1966	Kinkini Paada
1966	Seyawak Pasupasa
1966	Sudu Duwa
1966	Sanda Nega Eddi
1967	Hathara Kendare
1967	Ran Rasa
1969	Hari Maga
1969	Hathara Peraliya
1969	Surayangeth Sooraya
1969	Prawesamwanna
1969	Pancha
1970	Dan Mathakada
1970	Geetha
1970	Ohoma Hondada
1970	Suli Sulang
1971	Poojithayo
1971	Ran Onchilla
1971	Kathuru Muwath
1971	Hathara Denama Surayo
1971	Abirahasa
1972	Adare Hithenawa Dekkama
1972	Edath Sooraya Adath Sooraya
1972	Sujeewa
1972	Ada Mehemai
1972	Lokuma Hinawa
1972	Ihatha Aathmaya
1973	Suhada Pethuma
1973	Thushara
1973	Hondama Welawa
1973	Sinawai Inawai
1973	Sunethra
1973	Hondai Narakai
1973	Daahakin Ekek
1973	Hondata Hondai
1974	Duleeka
1974	Kasthuri Suwanda
1974	Sheela
1974	Surekha
1974	Hadawath Naththo
1974	Kalyani Ganga
1974	Shanthi
1974	Onna Babo Billo Enawa
1974	Susee
1974	Duppathage Hithawatha
1974	Lasandaa
1974	Sahayata Danny
1974	Mehema Harida
1974	Wasthuwa
1975	Hitha Honda Minihek
1975	Obai Mamai
1975	Kaliyuga Kale
1975	Raththaran Amma
1975	Awa Soya Adare
1975	Sookiri Kella
1975	Siril Malli
1975	Mage Nangi Shyama
1975	Lassana Kella
1975	Kokilayo
1975	Gijulihiniyo
1975	Sooraya Soorayamai
1975	Ranwan Rekha
1975	Damayanthi
1975	Lassana Dawasak
1975	Sadhanaa
1975	Hadawathaka Wasanthaya
1975	Sangeetha
1976	Pradeepe Maa Wewa
1976	Kawuda Raja
1976	Waasana
1976	Gangaa
1976	Waanarayo
1976	Aasha
1976	Unnath Dahai Malath Dahai
1976	Onna Maame Kella Panapi
1976	Nilla Soya
1976	Adarei Man Adarei
1976	Nedeyo
1976	Ran Thilakaa
1977	Neelaa
1977	Sudu Paraviyo
1977	Hithuwakkarayo
1977	Hariyanakota Ohoma Thama
1977	Hithuwoth Hithuwamai
1977	Nilukaa
1977	Pembara Madhu
1977	Chin Chin Nona
1977	Hitha Honda
1977	Sajaa
1977	Chandi Putha
1977	Aege Adara Kathawa
1977	Maruwa Samaga Waase
1977	Tom Pachaya
1977	Niwena Ginna
1978	Sithaka Suwanda
1978	Vishmaya
1978	Madhuwanthi
1978	Shri Pathula
1978	Aasha Desin
1978	Kundala Keshi
1978	Tikira
1978	Sally
1978	Durga
1978	Apsara
1978	Deepanjali
1978	Apeksha
1978	Kumara Kumariyo
1979	Samanmali
1979	Geheniyak
1979	Jeewana Kandulu
1979	Hingana Kolla
1979	Monara Thenna
1979	Eka Hitha
1979	Rosa Mal Thunak
1979	Akke Mata Awasara
1979	Sawudan Sema
1979	Subhani
1979	Visihathara Peya
1980	Mal Kekulu
1980	Tak Tik Tuk
1980	Seetha
1980	Doctor Susantha
1980	Raja Dawasak
1980	Sankhapaali
1980	Sabeetha
1982	Mihidum Sihina
1981	Ranga
1981	Eka Dawasak Rae
1981	Geethika
1981	Jeewanthi
1981	Bangali Walalu
1982	Thana Girawu
1982	Sudu Ayya
1982	Pethi Gomara
1982	Sanasanna Maa
1982	Sitharaa
1982	Thakkita Tharikita
1982	Newatha Hamuwemu
1982	Miss Mallika
1982	Ran Mini Muthu
1983	Sandamali
1983	Sumithuro
1983	Menik Maliga
1983	Loku Thaththa
1983	Mal Madhu
1983	Hithath Hondai Wedath Hondai
1984	Hitha Honda Kollek
1984	Bambara Patikki
1984	Namal Renu
1984	Hadawathaka Wedana
1984	Birinda
1984	Jaya Sikurui
1985	Raththaran Kanda
1985	Channai Kello Dennai
1985	Rosy
1985	Kirimaduwel
1986	Mal Warusa
1986	Prarthana
1986	Peralikarayo
1986	Gimhane Gee Naade
1986	Jaya Apatai
1986	Dinuma
1987	Yugayen Yugayata
1988	Yukthiyada Shakthiyada
1988	Raja Wedakarayo
1988	Obatai Priye Adare
1988	Rasa Rahasak
1988	Chandingeth Chandiya
1988	Amme Oba Nisa
1988	Newa Gilunath Ban Chun
1988	Satana
1989	Mamai Raja
1989	Nommara 17
1989	Shakthiya Obai Amme
1989	Waradata Danduwam
1990	Jaya Shakthi
1990	Dedunnen Samanaliyak
1990	Madhu Sihina
1990	Chandi Raja
1991	Sihina Ahase Wasanthe
1991	Asai Bayai
1991	Salambak Handai
1991	Alibaba Saha Horu Hathaliha
1991	Dhanaya
1992	Sakwithi Raja
1992	Sakkara Sooththara
1992	Sinha Raja
1992	Kiyala Wadak Na
1992	Sathya
1992	Sinhayangeth Sinhaya
1993	Sargent Nallathambi
1993	Sasara Saraisarana Thek Oba Mage
1993	Yasasa
1993	Soora Weera Chandiyo
1994	Raja Wansen Ekek
1994	Abhiyogaya
1995	Wasana Wewa
1995	Pudumai Eth Aththai
1995	Wairayen Wairaya
1995	Chandiyage Putha
1996	Mana Mohini
1996	Hitha Honda Geheniyak
1996	Bawa Sasara
1997	Soorayo Wedakarayo
1997	Vijayaggrahanaya
1997	Ragaye Unusuma
1998	Akkai Nangiyi
1998	Mohothin Mohotha
2001	Oba Koheda Priye
2001	Dinuma Kageda
2006	Double Game
2008	Hatha Denama Soorayo Remake
2008	Rosa Diganthe
2009	Sihina Dewuduwa
2017	Madhumali
