= Akalanka Ganegama =

Sri Lankan cricketer (born 1981)

Personal information
- Full name: Withanaarchchige Chamara Akalanka Ganegama
- Born: 29 March 1981 (age 45); Colombo, Sri Lanka
- Batting: Right-handed
- Bowling: Right-arm fast-medium
- Role: Bowling all-rounder

International information
- National side: Sri Lanka (2001–2006)
- ODI debut (cap 107): 8 April 2001 v Pakistan
- Last ODI: 29 January 2006 v Australia

Domestic team information
- Years: Team
- 2000/01–2012/13: Nondescripts
- 2013/14–2014/15: Colombo
- 2015/16: Chilaw Marians
- 2016/17–2017/18: Sri Lanka Ports Authority
- 2018/18–2019/20: Galle Cricket Club

Career statistics
| Competition | ODI | FC | LA | T20 |
|---|---|---|---|---|
| Matches | 4 | 138 | 126 | 39 |
| Runs scored | 7 | 2,375 | 571 | 271 |
| Batting average | 3.50 | 15.32 | 12.14 | 13.55 |
| 100s/50s | 0/0 | 1/5 | 0/0 | 0/0 |
| Top score | 7 | 133 | 31 | 38 |
| Balls bowled | 66 | 14,557 | 4,797 | 617 |
| Wickets | 2 | 322 | 147 | 30 |
| Bowling average | 44.00 | 26.70 | 24.10 | 27.00 |
| 5 wickets in innings | 0 | 13 | 2 | 0 |
| 10 wickets in match | 0 | 0 | 0 | 0 |
| Best bowling | 2/27 | 7/25 | 5/20 | 4/13 |
| Catches/stumpings | 1/– | 60/– | 38/– | 17/– |
- Source: Cricinfo, 4 May 2023

Withanaarchchige Chamara Akalanka Ganegama (born 29 March 1981), generally known as Akalanka Ganegama, is a former Sri Lankan international cricketer, and currently a TV presenter, dancer and singer as well as an entrepreneur.

He played cricket as a right-handed batsman and a right-arm medium-fast bowler who played in two One Day Internationals for Sri Lanka and has also played Twenty20 and List A cricket. He played domestic cricket for Nondescripts and currently for Chilaw Marians.

== Beyond cricket ==
Currently he is also working as an actor, and a dancer. He won "Sirasa Dancing Stars – season 2" competition held on 2008. He also sang a single song, named "Harima Hadai" with feat Iraj and Clews.

== Personal life ==
Ganegame married his long time partner Sehara Perera. The wedding was celebrated on 20 January 2024.

== Filmography ==
| Year | Film | Role | Ref. |
|---|---|---|---|
| 2012 | Super six | Hotel waiter | |
| 2016 | Cindrella | Chandula | |
| 2022 | Rashmi | Akash | |
