= Weeraratne =

Weeraratne is a Sri Lankan surname. Notable people with the surname include:

- Chandula Weeraratne (born 1995), Sri Lankan cricketer
- Iraj Weeraratne (born 1981), Sri Lankan rapper and songwriter
- Kaushalya Weeraratne (born 1981), Sri Lankan cricketer
- Sangeetha Weeraratne (born 1973), Sri Lankan actress
