= Wilson Karunaratne =

Sri Lankan film actor (1942–2022)

Wilson Karunaratne විල්සන් කරුණාරත්න
- Born: 28 October 1942; Colombo, British Ceylon
- Died: 3 May 2022 (aged 79); Colombo, Sri Lanka
- Education: Lumbini College
- Occupations: Actor, Stunt Director
- Years active: 1972–2019

Wilson Karunaratne, popularly known as Wilson Karu (28 October 1942 – 3 May 2022) was an actor in Sri Lankan cinema, and stunt director. Considered one of the best villains in Sinhala cinema, Karunaratne acted in more than 240 films across many genres primarily as main antagonist.

== Personal life ==
Wilson Karu was born on 28 October 1942 in Colombo, Sri Lanka as the second child of the family with four siblings. He had one elder brother, one younger sister and one younger brother. He completed education from Lumbini College, Colombo. During young ages, he played football, cricket, gymnastics, wrestling, judo and karate. Once he was selected to go to a football training camp in Pakistan, but he could not attend the camp as he fell from motor bike and broke the shoulder.

He never married and lived alone after the death of his parents. He died on 3 May 2022 at the age of 79. His remains were laid at Jayaratne parlour for public respect on 3 May 2022 and cremation took place at Kirulapone crematorium at 4 p.m on 4 May 2022.

== Career ==
He had a long standing passion to be an actor star where he frequently went to the film halls to watch English and Sinhala films. A relative called Punya Bulathsinhala referred him to the director of the film Hadawath Naththo Subayar Makeem in 1974. Karunaratne made his maiden cinematic appearance through the 1974 film Hadawath Naththo as a stuntman. The first scenario was the fight with Robin Fernando at the Rubber Estate. He went missing from the films for about a year after Hadawath Naththo. After that, with the help of Karunadasa Perera, the then production manager of the films, Karu re-entered the film industry by joining the fight scenes in films such as Yakadaya, Hitha Mithura, Sankapali and Saradielge Putha directed by Neil Rupasinghe and Sarath Rupasinghe.

In 1987, he got a lead role in the film Kiwule Gedara Mohottala directed by Pathiraja L.S. Dayananda. In one scene in the film, he had to jump from a height of about 80 feet, where his spine hit a rock. Dr. Godagama Jayasinghe treated his spine for months. He continued to make several near-to-death moments during jumps, summersaults and scenes in moving trains and trucks in the films such as: Dinesh Priyasad's Demodara Palama, Malani Fonseka's Sasara Chethana, Cyril Weerasinghe's Anuradha, Preethiraj Weeraratne's Pudumai Eth Aththai, Ranjith Siriwardena's Yudha Gini Meda etc. He won a merit award for the role "Nicholas" in Fonseka's film Sasara Chethana.

With that he acted in more than 250 Sinhala films and 15 television serials particularly as the villain. Apart from cinema, he appeared in the television serials Thara Devi produced by Lucien Bulathsinhala and also in the serials Eranga and Ran Kahawanu. Meanwhile, he also worked as the stunt director in few films. In 2018 he appeared in the music video Danuna produced by Iraj Weeraratne, where the public later criticized his appearance for the life of popular singer Victor Rathnayake.

== Arrest ==
In May 2020, Karu was arrest by the police due to obstruction of police duty in violation of quarantine laws. The incident had taken place in the Kirulapone area while attempting to obtain the Rs. 5000 allowance. He was produced to the court by Kirulapone police.

== Accident ==
In March 2021, Karu fell at his home and no one noticed for several hours. Neighbors rushed him to hospital after they saw the water continue to flow in the bathroom for a long time. He then received treatment at Ward 43 of the Colombo General Hospital. A Bodhi Pooja for a speedy recovery was held at the Bellanwila Temple on 21 March 2021.

== Filmography and stunt coordination ==
- No. denotes the Number of Sri Lankan film in the Sri Lankan cinema.

Year	No.	Film	Roles	Ref.
1974	288	Hadawath Naththo		
1974	302	Jeewana Ganga		
1976	352	Saradiyelge Putha	Rate Mahaththaya's son	
1977	365	Hithuwoth Hithuwamai	Karu	
1977	381	Yakadaya	Truck fighter	
1978	389	Seetha Devi		
1978	394	Hitha Mithura		
1978	395	Selinage Walawwa	Thug	
1978	399	Veera Puran Appu	Rebel	
1978	407	Apeksha		
1979	422	Wasanthaye Dawasak	Premasiri	
1979	429	Sugandhi		
1980	441	Jodu Walalu		
1980	451	Sasaraka Pathum		
1980	465	Sinhabahu		
1980	469	Kiduru Kumari	Fishermen leader	
1981	475	Sathweni Dawasa		
1981	477	Valampuri		
1981	485	Vajira	John. as Stunt coordinator	
1982	508	Bambara Geethaya	Landlord	
1982	512	Bicycale	Hichchi Mahaththaya	
1982	520	Anuradha		
1982	521	Jeewithayen Jeewithayak	as Stunt coordinator	
1983	547	Sumithuro	Share demander	
1983	550	Yali Pipunu Malak		
1983	552	Samuganimi Ma Samiyani	as Stunt coordinator	
1983	554	Chuttey	Henchman	
1983	560	Hasthi Viyaruwa		
1983	564	Manik Maliga		
1983	567	Samanala Sihina	as Stunt coordinator	
1983	568	Chandi Pataw	Gracien	
1984	578	Mala Giravi	Pipe yard samaritan	
1984	579	Kiri Kawadi	Cyril	
1984	584	Thaththai Puthai	Karu	
1984	589	Bambara Patikki		
1984	593	Sasara Chethana	Nicholas	
1984	601	Batti		
1984	607	Birinda		
1985	619	Puthuni Mata Samawenna		
1985	628	Du Daruwo		
1985	631	Sura Duthiyo		
1985	634	Kirimaduwal	as Stunt coordinator	
1986	643	Maldeniye Simion	Wilson	
1986	646	Koti Waligaya		
1986	647	Pooja	as Stunt coordinator	
1986	649	Dinuma	Piyadasa aka Bottle Piya	
1987	660	Kivulegedara Mohottala	Kiwuleygedera Mohottala	
1987	657	Thaththi Man Adarei		
1987	662	Kele Kella	Fighting logger	
1987	664	Nommana Ekai	Willie. as Stunt coordinator	
1987	665	Raja Wadakarayo	Dixon	
1987	666	Randamwal		
1987	668	Obatai Priye Adare	Henchman	
1988	674	Gedara Budun Amma	Mr. Gajanayake	
1988	676	Amme Oba Nisa		
1988	682	Ko Hathuro		
1989	688	Okkoma Rajawaru		
1989	691	Nommara 17	Wilson	
1989	690	Shakthiya Obai Amme		
1989	693	Waradata Daduwam		
1990	698	Thanha Asha	Willie	
1990	699	Jaya Shakthi		
1990	704	Hodin Naththam Narakin		
1990	707	Pem Rajadahana		
1990	710	Madu Sihina		
1990	712	Christhu Charithaya	Left side thief	
1990	713	Honda Honda Sellam	Don John	
1990	714	Hitha Honda Puthek		
1990	715	Hima Giri		
1991	718	Paaradise		
1991	719	Wada Barinam Wadak Na		
1991	721	Sihina Ahase Wasanthaya		
1991	724	Hithata Dukak Nathi Minisa		
1991	725	Asai Bayai		
1991	729	Esala Sanda		
1991	731	Salambak Handai		
1991	735	Ali Baba Saha Horu Hathaliha		
1991	736	Dhanaya		
1992	742	Ranabime Weeraya		
1992	747	Bajar Eke Chandiya		
1992	751	Ahimi Dadaman		
1992	752	Malsara Doni		
1992	755	Kiyala Wadak Na	Kapila's friend	
1992	758	Okkoma Kanapita		
1992	760	Oba Mata Wishwasai		
1992	762	Suranimala		
1992	763	Sathya		
1992	764	Muwan Palesse Kadira		
1992	765	Sinhayangeth Sinhaya	Chula Gunathilaka	
1993	771	Sargent Nallathambi	B. O. G. de Soysa	
1993	776	Sasara Sarisaranathek Oba Mage		
1993	784	Bambasara Bisaw		
1993	786	Sandarekha		
1993	792	Soora Weera Chandiyo	Wilson	
1994	796	Ekada Wahi		
1994	797	Jayagrahanaya		
1994	805	Ahas Maliga		
1994	808	Mawbime Weerayo		
1994	810	Okkoma Hondatai		
1994	813	Aathma		
1995	820	Inspector Geetha	Douglas	
1995	825	Rodaya		
1995	822	Vijay Saha Ajay		
1995	826	Ira Handa Illa		
1995	827	Pudumai Eth Aththai		
1995	829	Wairayen Wairaya		
1995	830	Demodara Palama	Maurice	
1995	834	Age Wairaya	Rocky	
1995	837	Edath Chandiya Adath Chandiya	Dougie	
1996	845	Api Baya Naha	Nayana abductor	
1996	851	Sura Duruwo		
1996	852	Veediye Weeraya		
1996	854	Mana Mohini	Kira	
1996	858	Hiru Sanduta Madi Wee		
1996	859	Seema Pawuru		
1996	862	Mal Hathai		
1997	873	Soorayo Wadakarayo		
1997	879	Viyaru Gaheniyak		
1997	888	Ninja Sri Lanka		
1998	892	Yuda Gini Mada	Wilson	
1998	895	Sathutai Kirula Ape		
1998	900	Girl Friend		
1998	903	Age Wairaya 3	Tony	
1999	910	Salupata Ahasata		
1999	917	Ayadimi Sama	Tikiri's father	
2000	935	Dadabima	Baladasa henchman. as Stunt coordinator	
2000	936	Danduwama	Mervin	
2000	939	Age Wairaya 4	Bullet	
2000	944	Pem Kekula		
2001	950	Oba Koheda Priye	Wilson	
2001	951	Oba Magema Wewa		
2002	973	Parliament Jokes	Walisundara	
2003	1002	Vala In London	Gajasinghe	
2003	1015	Sonduru Dadabima	Inspector Wimalasena	
2003	1016	Yakada Pihatu	Gal Somey	
2003	1017	Bheeshanaye Athuru Kathawak		
2005	1051	One Shot	Minister Walisundara	
2005	1060	Seethala Hadu		
2007	1091	Hai Master		
2008	1108	Ali Pancha Mage Mithura		
2008	1117	Nil Diya Yahana	as Stunt coordinator	
2011	1164	Putha Mage Sooraya		
2012	1173	Vijaya Kuweni	Chief of Yaksha clan	
2014	1208	Ahelepola Kumarihami		
2014	1209	Parapura		
2015	1219	Bonikka		
2015	1224	Sanjana		
2019	1330	Thiththa Aththa		
2022		Rashmi		
