= Thiththa Aththa =

Sri Lankan comedy film

- Sinhala: තිත්ත ඇත්ත
- Directed by: Prithiraj Weerarathna
- Written by: Prithiraj Weerarathna
- Produced by: Prithiraj Weerarathna
- Starring: Tennison Cooray; Rajitha Hiran; Sanath Gunathilake
- Cinematography: Sajitha Weerapperuma
- Edited by: Pravin Jayaratne
- Music by: Iraj Weerarathne
- Distributed by: MPI Theaters
- Release date: 20 April 2019
- Country: Sri Lanka
- Language: Sinhala

Thiththa Aththa (Sinhala: තිත්ත ඇත්ත, lit. 'Bitter truth') is a 2019 Sri Lankan Sinhalese comedy film directed and produced by Prithiraj Weerarathna. It stars Tennison Cooray in lead role along with Don Guy, Sanath Gunathilake, Susila Kottage and Rajitha Hiran in supportive roles. Music composed by Iraj Weerarathne.

== Cast ==
- Tennison Cooray Walgama, Walisinghe's secretary
- Don Guy as Minister Walisinghe
- Sanath Gunathilake
- Rajitha Hiran as Vise Kurutta
- Wilson Karunaratne
- Susila Kottage
- Nilmini Kottegoda
- D.B. Gangodathenna
- Chathura Perera
- Udaya Kumari
- Sando Harris
- Mervyn Silva
- Madushani Wickramasinghe
- Manel Chandralatha

== Songs ==
The film consists with three songs.

| No. | Title | Lyrics | Singer(s) | Length |
|---|---|---|---|---|
| 1. | "Wisekara Kurutta" | Indika Wickramaratne | Iraj Weeraratne |
| 2. | "Hithuwakkari" | Wasantha Dukgannarala | Iraj Weeraratne ft. Nilukshi |
| 3. | "Kaada Raaja" | Shehan Galahitiyawa | Iraj Weeraratne, Peshala Manoj |
