= Dhawala Pushpaya =

Dhawala Pushpaya ධවල පුෂ්පය
- DVD poster
- Directed by: K.A.W. Perera
- Written by: K. A. W. Perera
- Produced by: EAP Films
- Starring: Vasanthi Chathurani; Ravindra Randeniya; Priyankara Perera
- Cinematography: Andrew Jayamanne
- Edited by: Elmo Halliday
- Music by: Gratien Ananda
- Production company: Hong Kong Color Movie Lab
- Distributed by: EAP Theatres
- Release date: 20 May 1994
- Country: Sri Lanka
- Language: Sinhala

Dhawala Pushpaya (Sinhala: ධවල පුෂ්පය Translation : White Flower) is a 1994 Sri Lankan Sinhala romantic drama film directed by K.A.W. Perera and produced by Soma Edirisinghe for EAP Films. It stars Vasanthi Chathurani, Ravindra Randeniya and Priyankara Perera in lead roles along with Anjela Seneviratne and Vijaya Nandasiri. The music was composed by Gratien Ananda. It is the 1165th Sri Lankan film in the Sinhala cinema.

== Plot ==
The story centers on the romance between Dr. Nalin (played by Ravindra Randeniya), a doctor at a hospital, and Shobha (played by Vasanthi Chathurani), a new nurse who has recently joined the staff.

The primary conflict arises from Dr. Nalin's sister, who is also the matron of the hospital. She strongly disapproves of the relationship between her brother and the nurse and actively works to separate them. The film explores the challenges the couple faces due to this familial opposition within their professional environment.

== Cast ==
- Vasanthi Chathurani as Soba
- Ravindra Randeniya as Nalin
- Priyankara Perera as Vinod
- Anjela Seneviratne as Brenda
- Vijaya Nandasiri as Pathirana
- Mercy Edirisinghe as Bording owner
- Manike Attanayake as Matron
- Premasiri Kalpage
- Channa Perera - uncredited role

== Soundtrack ==
No.	Title	Singer(s)	Length
1.	"Landak Landak Dutimi Landak"	Mervin Perera
2.	"Prarthana Dehade"	Gratien Ananda
3.	"Pinimal Thalawe"	Latha Walpola
