= Vala In London =

Vala In London වැලා ඉන් ලන්ඩන්
- Directed by: Hemasiri Sellapperuma
- Written by: Hemasiri Sellapperuma
- Based on: Hemasiri Sellapperuma
- Produced by: T. Quintus Peiris
- Starring: Ranjan Ramanayake; Tennyson Cooray; Sabeetha Perera
- Cinematography: M. H. Gafoor
- Edited by: Kumarasiri de Silva
- Music by: Sarath Dassanayake
- Production company: Dil Foses Studio
- Distributed by: Dil Films
- Release date: 12 February 2003
- Country: Sri Lanka
- Language: Sinhala

Vala In London (Sinhala: වැලා ඉන් ලන්ඩන්) is a 2003 Sri Lankan Sinhalese comedy film directed by Hemasiri Sellapperuma and produced by T. Quintus Peiris for NS Films. It stars Ranjan Ramanayake, Tennyson Cooray, and Sabeetha Perera in lead roles along with Wilson Karunaratne and Freddie Silva. Music composed by Sarath Dassanayake. It is the 971st Sri Lankan film in the Sinhalese cinema.

== Cast ==
- Ranjan Ramanayake as Suranga
- Tennyson Cooray as Valentine 'Vala' / Professor Surpentine
- Sabeetha Perera as Nayomi
- Uresha Geethanjali as Gayomi
- Wilson Karunaratne as Gajasinghe
- Freddie Silva as Charlie
- Manel Chandralatha as Sobani
- Teddy Vidyalankara as Gajasinghe's son
- Gemunu Wijesuriya as Helped slumdweller's husband
- Sunil Hettiarachchi as Vala's father
- Berty Gunathilake as Gajasinghe's servant

== Soundtrack ==
No.	Title	Singer(s)	Length
1.	"Padila Pina Padila"	Ishak Beg, Uresha Ravihari
2.	"Handa Wage Handa Mage"	Gratien Ananda, Uresha Ravihari
3.	"Ninden Sihinen"	Gratien Ananda, Uresha Ravihari
