= Deveni Gamana =

Deveni Gamana දෙවෙනි ගමන
- Directed by: H.D. Premaratne
- Produced by: M.P. Rathnapala Marawanagoda
- Starring: Sanath Gunathilake; Sabeetha Perera; Ravindra Randeniya
- Cinematography: Sumitta Amarasinghe
- Edited by: Jayatissa Dillimuni
- Music by: Premasiri Khemadasa
- Release date: 2 March 1984
- Country: Sri Lanka
- Language: Sinhala

Deveni Gamana is a 1982 Sri Lankan film directed by H.D. Premaratne.

== Cast ==
- Sanath Gunathilake as Saman
- Denawaka Hamine as Unmarried old aunt
- Sabeetha Perera as Sujatha
- Ravindra Randeniya as Saman's brother
- Iranganie Serasinghe as Saman's mother
- Gamini Wijesuriya as Father
- Nilanthi Wijesinghe
- Girley Gunawardana
- Seetha Kumari
- Vincent Vaas
- Anura Medagoda
- Joe Dambulagala
- Ramani Fonseka
- Nawanandana Wijesinghe
- Felix Premawardhana
- Kanthi Fonseka

== Plot ==
Saman is a school teacher. He marries his cousin Sujatha after a long love affair. On the wedding night, she couldn't prove her virginity. Therefore, her in laws harass her. Saman also suspects. Thus she leaves her husband's house and goes to her parents. But Saman brings her back. But Saman's mother and his unmarried old aunt make her to leave the home again. When she is leaving Saman comes and stop her.
