= Kumaran Ratnam =

Kumaran Ratnam was a Ceylonese physician. He was the youngest son of Dr E.V. Ratnam founder of Ratnam Private Hospital (founded 1905) in Union Place, Colombo the oldest Hospital in Sri Lanka. A long-standing member of the Colombo Municipal Council from the Slave Island Ward, he was elected as Mayor of Colombo from January 1950 to December 1950.

He had two brothers, Raja and Mahesa and two sisters, Leila and Nasam. He was married to Meena Coomaraswamy, and lived in Barnes Place, Colombo. He was the brother-in-law of Mangala Moonesinghe. Following his death, the Short Road in Union Place was renamed Dr. Kumaran Ratnam Road.
