= Girley Gunawardana =

Sri Lankan actress

Girley Gunawardana ගර්ලි ගුණවර්ධන
- Born: Dona Girley Grace Gunawardana; 15 November 1935; Mount Lavinia, Dehiwela, Sri Lanka
- Died: 11 March 2012 (aged 76); Colombo
- Education: Girls High School Mount Lavinia
- Occupation: Actress
- Years active: 1952–1994
- Spouse: Stanley Perera (m. 1956)
- Children: 4
- Relatives: Sabeetha Perera (daughter)

Dona Girley Grace Gunawardana (ගර්ලි ගුණවර්ධන, [Sinhala]; 15 November 1935 – 11 March 2012), popularly known as Girley Gunawardana, was an actress in Sri Lankan cinema. She is the mother of popular actress Sabeetha Perera.

== Personal life ==
Gunawardana was born on 15 November 1935 in Mount Lavinia as the fifth child of the family. She had three elder brothers - Titus, Lionel, Erwin - and one elder sister and one younger sister, Rose. She was educated at Girls High School Mount Lavinia.

Gunawardana was married to popular film actor Stanley Perera. She identified Stanley through her friends Bhadra Marapana and A.J. De Zoysa. On 21 July 1956, they secretly got engaged. It was a secret, even though both were acting together. The couple have four daughters - Sandya, Sadna and Sabeetha and Chandima. Third daughter Sabeetha Perera is a popular actress in Sinhala cinema, who acted in more than 70 films. Sabeetha also won Sarasaviya Award for the best actress in 1985.

She died on 11 March 2012 at the age of 76. (Note: Several newspapers cited she died at the age 70. However leading cinema source Sarasaviya recorded her birthday in 1935 and death in 2012. Therefore she died at the age 76.) Her remains were kept at no: 286, Sri Jayewardenepura Mawatha, Kottte her residence. The funeral took place at Borella Cemetery at 6.30 pm on 13 March 2012.

== Career ==
During school times, she learned drama under Ailean Sarachchandra, wife of popular playwright Ediriweera Sarachchandra. She had the opportunity to dance under Neranjana Devi who taught dance and acting under Ailean. Her first acting in public came through the stage play Dope Aya.

In 1952, there was an advertisement published by Sri Murugan New Art Film Company for a vacancy for an actress for the latest film Prema Tharagaya. She went to the "Sundara" studio in Kandana with two of her friends. She was selected for a minor role in the film under the guidance of Laddy Ranasinghe. She also got a part of a song as a friend of the lead actress Ayesha Weerakoon.

As a result of Prema Tharagaya, Gunawardana was selected for S. M. Nayagam's next production Puduma Leli in 1953 along with Prem Jayanth and Nanda Leelanayake. In the film, she also had a dance scene.

She learned a lot from Sirisena Wimalaweera as her acting master during the shooting of popular film Saradiel in 1953. She played a lead role "Thangamma" in the film and it became highly popular.

After the secret marriage, Stanley and Girley acted as lovers in the 1956 film Duppathage Dukka. In the film, Stanley played the role "Thilak", a rebellious university youth and Girley played "Nalini". Laddy Ranasinghe played as "Dharma Sri", grandfather of Nalini. There was a scene where "Dharma Sri" slaps "Nalini". The shot came real and Girley had to hospitalized for three days due to the slap.

After the film Duppathage Dukka, she acted in several commercially successful films such as Ganthera, Suba Sarana Sepa Sithe, Sasaraka Hati, Laa Dalu, Hathara Maha Nidhanaya, Iwasana Danaa, Davena Pipasaya, Tom Pachaya and Rasa Rahasak. In 1984, Girley acted together with her own daughter Sabeetha in the film Deweni Gamana, which marked her second journey in the cinema with an adult role for the first time. In the 1967 film Iwasana Danaa, Girley starring with her husband Stanley Perera and her daughter Sabeetha.

She left the cinema after having children. However she appeared in few minor roles hereafter. Her last cinema appearance was in 1994 film Ahas Maliga.

== Filmography ==
Year	Film	Role	Ref.
1952	Prema Tharagaya	Dancer	
1953	Puduma Leli	Dancer	
1954	Saradiel	Thangamma	
1956	Duppathage Duka	Nalini	
1957	Saradama		
1961	Gan Thera		
1964	Suba Sarana Sepa Sithe		
1964	Chandali		
1964	Sasaraka Hati		
1965	Hathara Maha Nidhanaya	Daisy Dharmawardena	
1965	Laa Dalu		
1965	Sonduru Yuwala		
1967	Hathara Kendare		
1967	Iwasana Danaa		
1969	Hathara Peraliya		
1971	Dawena Pipasa		
1972	Hathara Wate		
1977	Tom Pachaya	Miss Primrose	
1982	Sandaa	Sanda's mother	
1983	Samanala Sihina		
1984	Adara Geethaya		
1984	Deveni Gamana		
1984	Podi Ralahami	1st proposal onlooker	
1987	Kawuluwa		
1988	Rasa Rahasak		
1992	Okkoma Kanapita		
1994	Ahas Maliga		
