= Wasantha Dukgannarala =

Sri Lankan actor and lyricist

Wasantha Duggannarala
- වසන්ත දුක්ගන්නාරාළ
- Born: Duggannaralalage Wasantha Kumara Bandara; December 10, 1969 (age 56); Hingulwala, Kandy, Sri Lanka
- Education: Anuradhapura Central College
- Alma mater: University of Sri Jayewardenepura
- Occupations: Actor, dramatist, lyricist, Announcer, author, Producer, CEO
- Years active: 1995–present
- Spouse: Manoja Priyadarshani Duggannarala
- Children: Sandapini Duggannarala and Sandalindu Duggannarala

Duggannaralalage Wasantha Kumara Bandara (Sinhala: වසන්ත දුක්ගන්නාරාළ), popularly known as Dukaa, is an actor in Sri Lankan cinema and stage drama as well as a lyricist, television host, author and media personality.

== Personal life ==
He was born in Hingulwala, Kandy. He completed primary education Kahatagasdigiliya Primary School and then secondary education from Anuradhapura Central College. He is a graduate of University of Sri Jayewardenepura.

He is married to Manoja Priyadarshani Duggannarala, and the couple has one daughter and one son, Sandapini and Sandalindu Duggannarala.

== Drama career ==
In 1995, he joined with Sawana radio channel as a professional journalist under the guidance of Jackson Anthony. During school times, he produced stage plays such as Seeruwen Sitin and Ghathakayo. Then he acted in many popular stage plays during university life, such as Paraassa, Dewaraii, Yakshagamanaya, Deweni Mahinda and Derdandaa.

On 2 April 2016, he conducted a show titled Dukaa at Nelum Pokuna Theater to celebrate 25 years in media career. He produced a stage drama Baala Samaagama along with Mihira Sirithilaka and Ajith Lokuge.

== Television career ==
He also acted in the popular television serial Ingammaruwa. He hosted the television reality program CIC Shoora Goviya for two seasons, which was telecasted on TV Derana. He then hosted the theater program Sonduru Agnyaawa telecasted on ITN. He, along with fellow actor Ajith Lokuge became the winners of reality show Star City Comedy Season.

He is the founder of television company, Right Brain Networks. He produced two programs through the company – Agree with Murali and Raeta Raeta. Both programs are telecasted on ITN.

== Author work ==
He has published two books – Man Sinhayata Bayai Nangiye and U Thamai Duka.

== Filmography ==
His maiden cinema acting came through 1998 film Julietge Bhumikawa directed by Jackson Anthony. Then he worked with Jackson again in the 2008 blockbuster hit Aba, where he played the role of 'Maha Berana'.

=== As actor ===
Year	Film	Role	Ref.
1998	Julietge Bhumikawa		
2008	Aba	Maha Berana	
2014	Siri Daladagamanaya	Prince Ksheerajanthu	

=== As lyricist ===
Year	Film	Ref.
2006	Anjalika	
2007	Asai Man Piyabanna	
2008	Adaraye Namayen	
2009	Dancing Star	
2011	Challenges	
2019	Thiththa Aththa	
2020	Nim Him	

== Lyrics ==
He has contributed to more than 300 popular songs ranges from classical pop, R&B, Blues and Hip Hop genre. In 1996, he wrote the popular song Man Sinhayata Bayay Nangiye for Senanayake Weraliyadde. In 2000, he composed popular hit Ran Kurahan Mala for BnS. And the song Mal Pan Podak written for BnS became the song of the millennial youth. Then he wrote the song Nethra. He has also collaborated with popular artists such as Dushyanth Weeraman, Iraj Weeraratne, Chinthi and Ranindu. Dushyanth's song Pana Senehasa was also very popular. Then he came with the song Ahankara Nagare for Ranidu Lankage. It became the most popular song on the index.

Also, he made the song Sokoari for newcomer Chinthi. He was reprimanded for writing the song Sokari which later became a social issue. The song Sokari is the only song that was censored with only one word. The word 'Kansa' (meaning "Cannabis") was censored and published in the media. And then, Duka wrote the first ringing tone song in Sri Lanka, Ahankara Nagare. Then he wrote the songs Ravum Kade for Gayantha Perera and Hanthane for Ashanti de Alwis. For Romesh and Lakshan, he wrote the song Ma Desa Neth Nopiya Balapoo. Meanwhile, Govi Geethaya and Api Wenuwen Api songs even won awards.

=== Selected lyrics ===
- Adambarai Baluwamanam
- Ahankara Nagare
- Api Daduru Oyen Panna
- Api Innam Oba Wenuwen
- Binkundo
- Gajaman Nona
- Govi Geethaya
- Hadakam
- Hanthane
- Harima Hadai
- Heta Elivena Thuru Nata
- Hithumathe
- Hitha Poodinneth
- Ilayata Wehila
- Japura Premaya
- Kalakata Passe
- Katakarakam
- Kathirina
- Kodre
- Kulaganak
- Mage Jeewithema
- Mal Mal Sariya
- Mal Pan Podak
- Man Sil Bidagaththe
- Man Sinhayata Bayai Nangiye
- Man Thaniyen Awidin
- Mumunanawa
- Muragala Pasukara
- Nikula Pembara
- Ninda Noyana Hendawe
- Pana Senehasa
- Pawurakin Nobidena
- Petaluna
- Premaya Usai
- Ran Kurahan Mala
- Ridum Dena
- Sasara Aranyaye
- Sindu Hendewa
- Thawa Eka Parak
- Thumba Mal
- Thurule Nidan (Manamali 2)
- Yannada Igilli
