= Hemasiri Sellapperuma =

Sri Lankan filmmaker

Hemasiri Sellapperuma හේමසිරි සෙල්ලප්පෙරුම
- Born: Hemasiri Sellapperuma; 25 October; Panadura, Sri Lanka
- Education: St. Anthony's College, Panadura
- Occupations: Director, producer, screen writer, editor, art director
- Years active: 1978–2015
- Website: [www.hemasiri.com]

Hemasiri Sellapperuma (born 25 October: Sinhala: හේමසිරි සෙල්ලප්පෙරුම), is a Sri Lankan screenplay writer, editor and filmmaker in Sri Lankan cinema. He is a prolific director who directed the second most films in Sri Lankan cinema with thirty-six films in various genres.

== Personal life ==
He completed education from St. Anthony's College, Panadura. During school, he achieved a medal of Queen as a Scout. He is also the chairman of the Lions club in Egodawatta. In addition to that, he is also a Justice in Peace.

His cousin son Rajitha Hiran is also a renowned comedy artist.

== Career ==
While in the school, he worked as an editor at the institute of Serendib. He first directed a short film Saara Poro Jelivet. After completing education, he joined with his mentor, Consistence Cooray. He is first person to produce films for children in Sri Lanka. Under Consistence, Sellapperuma worked as an assistant director for his films such as: Samaja Sevaya, Gami Kolla and Asaranaya.

Later he worked as an assistant editor in the film Punchi Baba saha Nari Latha directed by Tissa Liyanasooriya. Then he joined with K. A. W. Perera and worked as an assistant director in several films including: Bicycle Hora, Seeye Nottuwa, Kathuru Muwath, Aparadhaya Saha Daduwama and Lokuma Hinawa. Meanwhile, he passed the written examination to register as a director and editor in National Film Co-operation by directing the film Sara Polowa Jaya Bimai.

In 1981, he made his debut cinema direction with the black and white film Jeewanthi. After the success of the film, he made the second film Sathweni Davasa which became a blockbuster of that year. In 1982, at the Malaysian Film Festival, the film won the Golden award for the Best Commercial Film in the Asia. In 1989, he made the blockbuster film Nommara 17. The film broke several commercial records, where the film screened record 210 days at the 'National' cinema hall in Maharagama as well as screened in the opening cinemas for 200 days. However, before the screening, the lead actor Vijaya Kumaranatunga was assassinted. There was a big uproar in the cinema halls during the screening of the film. People were at queue at cinema halls from 8 am to witness Vijaya's last film. There have even been stabbing incidents recorded in 'Gemunu' and 'Manel' cinema theaters as well. In 18th Sarasaviya Awards in 1990, Nommara 17 won the award for the Most Famous Film with 40,535 votes.

He was honored with the 'Kala Jothi' Award as well. In 2015, he directed his last film Sanjaana.

== Filmography ==
Year	Film	Roles	Ref.
1981	Jewanthi	Director, Screenwriter, Film Editor, Art Director	
1981	Sathweni Dawasa	Director, Film Editor	
1983	Senehasaka Kandulu	Director, Technical Advisor	
1988	Chandingeth Chandiya	Director, Producer	
1988	Newa Gilunath Ban Chun	Director	
1989	Nommara 17	Director	
1991	Uthura Dakuna	Director, Screenwriter	
1991	Asai Bayai	Director	
1991	Love In Bangkok	Director, Screenwriter	
1991	Salambak Handai	Director, Screenwriter	
1992	Bajar Eke Chandiya	Director	
1992	Sakkara Suththara	Director, Screenwriter	
1992	Malsara Doni	Director	
1992	Sinha Raja	Director, Screenwriter	
1992	Kiyala Wadak Na	Director, Screenwriter	
1993	Sandareka	Director, Screenwriter	
1993	Lagin Giyoth Ehek Na	Director	
1993	Sura Veera Chandiyo	Director	
1994	Rajawansen Ekek	Director, Screenwriter	
1994	Abhiyogaya	Director	
1994	Nohadan Landune	Director	
1994	Okkoma Hondatai	Director, Screenwriter	
1994	Hello My Darling	Director, Screenwriter	
1995	Pudumai Eth Aththai	Director	
1995	Vairayen Vairaya	Director	
1996	Manamohini	Director, Screenwriter	
1996	Hiru Sanduta Madivi	Director	
1996	Mal Hathai	Director, Screenwriter	
1997	Surayo Wadakarayo	Director, Screenwriter	
1999	Ayadimi Sama	Director, Screenwriter	
2000	Danduwama	Director, Screenwriter	
2001	Oba Koheda Priye	Director	
2003	Vala In London	Director, Screenwriter	
2008	Duplicate	Director	
2015	Sanjaana	Director, Screenwriter	
