= Ratnam Private Hospital =

Coordinates: 6.9210487052243375°N 79.8571452162268°E

Geography
- Location: 227 Dr. Colvin R De Silva Mawatha, Colombo, Sri Lanka

Organisation
- Type: Private hospital

History
- Opened: 1905

Links
- Other links: List of hospitals in Sri Lanka

The Ratnam Private Hospital, LTD. is a hospital located in Colombo, Sri Lanka. Founded in 1905 by Dr E.V. Ratnam, the hospital was the first private hospital to be established in the country. It was one of the top hospitals in Sri Lanka, serving many affluent members of society, celebrities, and tourists. The hospital was used for medical tourism by foreign visitors from across Asia, including India, the Maldives, China, Singapore, and more. Today, the hospital is mostly non-functional, being used mostly for small-scale surgeries, as well as being used as an elderly care facility.

== History ==
The hospital was founded in 1905 by Dr. E.V. Ratnam. It was the first privately owned hospital in Sri Lanka. Ownership was then transferred to Dr. Kumaran Ratnam, who also served as Mayor of Colombo in 1950. Most recently, the hospital was owned and headed by Dr. Ganesh Ratnam, until his death in 2018.

In 1987, the hospital was famously the location in which famed singer H.R. Jothipala died. The hospital was surrounded by mourners, and some even jumped over the gate to catch a glimpse of the singer.

In 1993, the hospital served many wounded victims in the aftermath of the attack on President Ranasinghe Premadasa.
