= H. R. Jothipala =

Sri Lankan singer

- එච්.ආර්. ජෝතිපාල
- Born: Hettiarachchige Reginald Jothipala; 12 February 1936; Dematagoda, British Ceylon
- Died: 7 July 1987 (aged 51); Colombo, Sri Lanka
- Resting place: Borella cemetery
- Other name: Hadawatha Raththaran Jothi
- Education: St. Lawrence College, Maradana; St. John's College, Dematagoda
- Occupations: Actor, Playback singer
- Years active: 1956-1987
- Spouse: Blossom Winter (m. 1958)
- Children: 4

Hettiarachchige Reginald Jothipala (Sinhala: හෙට්ටිආරච්චිගේ රෙජිනෝල්ඩ් ජෝතිපාල; 12 February 1936 – 7 July 1987), popularly known as H. R. Jothipala, was a Sri Lankan playback singer in the Sinhala cinema as well as a film actor and producer. Considered as the best playback singer in Sri Lankan film history, Jothipala lent his voice to all classes of actors ranging from Eddie Jayamanne to Shashi Wijendra. He also worked as an opera singer. He died in July 1987 at the age of 51 year from cardiac arrest.

== Personal life ==
Jothipala was born on 12 February 1936 in Dematagoda, Colombo, Sri Lanka as the first child in a middle-class family. His father H. R. James was a tailor in Matara and mother Ahaliyagoda H. K. Podinona Perera was a nurse. Their home town is Matara, Sri Lanka & They later moved to Colombo. He attended St. Lawrence College in Maradana and St. John's College in Dematagoda. He has four younger sisters and one younger brother.

Jothipala would visit tea kiosks to hear music as his family didn't own a radio. He cleaned medicine bottles at the Sulaiman Hospital on Armor Street, Colombo. Later he worked as the peon in M. D. Gunasena and the company.

He was married to Blossom Winter, they had four daughters together. He came to be known by his initials "H. R." and was loved as "Hadhavatha Raththaran Jothipala", meaning "golden-hearted Jothipala", due to his kindness to people of all ages, communities, and families.

== Career ==
=== Early days ===
Nadarajah, one of the best radio tabla players in the country at the time, was living at Kosgas Junction in Grandpass, Colombo. One day he heard Jothipala singing and chose to sing Hindi songs at the weddings of the Colombo aristocracy. B. S. Perera, the famous film music director who was the head of the radio orchestra who first recognized Jothipala's talents. In 1952, there was a program on the radio called 'Adhunika Peya', which showcased the talents of amateur singers, courtesy of the Queen Sweets Company. He competed in this competition and became the winner. From there he went to the radio program "Jayagrahi Pelapaliya" and won first place.

In 1955, he missed three golden opportunities to become a playback singer. At first, he went to meet Wimalaweera master who composed music for the film Podi Putha. During the audition, Wimalaweera informed Jothipala that his voice is not right, where it trembles and not sweet. In February, Jothipala and Chandrasena went Negombo and met B. A. W. Jayamanne and Rukmani Devi. Even though they satisfied about his voice, Jothipala could not go to India for playback as he did not have a passport. In the third time, he met A. B. Raj, director of the film Perakadoru Bena. He refused Jothipala due to having rough voice.

Jothipala made his debut as a playback singer on Cyril P. Abeyratne's Surathalee, singing "Siriyame Sara", in 1956. Jothipala has said that he contemplated taking his life when he went with his friends to watch Podi Putha and found out that his song was not included. Later when Surathalee producer Jabir A. Cader wanted to hear one of his songs to consider him for the film, Jothipala almost passed on the offer as he did not possess enough money to create a record. He was helped out by veteran musician Stanley Omar who financed him for the sum of 35 rupees – a large amount of money at the time. Jothipala's song on the film, "Siriyame Sara," still remains popular in Sri Lanka, having recorded the popular number under the direction of T.R. Papa at Wahini Studio in India.

Jothipala has worked with many of Sri Lanka's reputed directors. In the early stages of his career, Jothipala had the opportunity to work with filmmaker Lester James Peries on the movie Sandeshaya. Jothipala performed the song "Puruthugeesi Karaya" for the film, which was composed by the legendary Sunil Santha, music directed by R. Muthuswamy and written by the veteran lyricist Arisen Ahubudu.

=== Success ===
Jothipala was the undisputed choice in films that were made in the late sixties and through the seventies, the period during which he also began to act. Though Jothi was criticized for singing to the tunes of popular Hindi songs, particularly of Mohammed Rafi, he also sang under the batons of P.V. Nandasiri, Premasiri Khemadasa, Sarath Dassanayake and Milton Mallawarachchi. Jothipala is considered the backbone of Sri Lankan playback singing. He has voiced a wide array of actors across many decades in his era. Apart from singing, he also acted in 35 films.

He sang in hundreds of films including popular hits like Kasthuri Suwanda, Thushara, Sweeep Ticket, Hitha Honda Minihek, Kawuda Raja, Hondata Hondai, Wasana, Sangeetha and others. The award-winning singer also played some memorable roles in films including Ethulweema Thahanam, Sulalitha Sobani, Sujeewa, Sukiri Kella, Abirahasa, Bonikka, Shanthi and his own production Sumithuro and Obai Mamai. He made his film debut as an actor in 1958 with a minor role in the film Daskama and later played mostly villain characters.

Although Jothipala was very talented in his own respect, he was criticized for singing to the tunes of popular Hindi songs, particularly of Mohammed Rafi. Jothipala sang many duets with Sujatha Attanayake and Latha Walpola,'but largely with Angeline Gunathilake. Jothipala's best friend was the then popular singer J. A. Milton Perera. In the late 1950s, the duo debated their theme song "Anangaya" cult on the radio commercial service. Jothipala won the Best Singer award for his song "Mee Jeevanaye" from the 1974 film Onna Babo Billo Enawa. At the 1983 Sarasaviya Awards, Jothipala won the Award for Best Singer for the song "Sara Sande" from the film Meedum Sihina and for the song "Paalu Susane" from the 1986 film Obata Divura Kiyannam.

The Sinhala Baila song Pissu Vikare (Dagena Polkatu Male) by H. R. Jothipala, Milton Perera, M. S. Fernando is a cover version of the Tamil song Dingiri Dingale (Meenachi) from the 1958 Tamil film Anbu Engey. And it was covered again in Sinhala as a folk song named Digisi/Digiri Digare (Kussiye Badu).

=== Death ===
Two days before his death, on 5 July 1987, he participated in "Gam Udaawa", a patriotic project by late President Ranasinghe Premadasa, and sang on his final open stage. But while singing he felt pain but finished the singing successfully. The next day he was admitted to the hospital. Jothipala died on 7 July 1987 at Ratnams Private Hospital. The cause of his death was said to be liver failure. "He came to our hospital very regularly. Ramya Fleming was in charge of the ICU and was at home when she got the call to come in. As soon as news spread of Jothipala's death, people surrounded Ratnam Private Hospital. All of Union Square was filled with fans, and some even jumped over the hospital gate just to get a glimpse of Jothipala.

Numerous activities are still underway throughout the country for his commemorations.

== Filmography and Playback singing ==
Year	Film	Acting role	Other roles	Ref.
1956	Surathali		Playback singing	
1958	Ekamath Eka Rataka		Playback singing	
1958	Deyyange Rate		Playback singing	
1958	Daskama	Crowd member	Playback singing	
1958	Vana Mohini		Playback singing	
1959	Avishwasaya		Playback singing	
1959	Sri 296		Playback singing	
1959	Gehenu Geta		Playback singing	
1960	Subhadra		Playback singing	
1960	Sandeshaya		Playback singing	
1960	Nalangana		Playback singing	
1961	Suvineetha Lalani		Playback singing	
1961	Gan Thera		Playback singing	
1962	Sansare		Playback singing	
1962	Suhada Divi Piduma		Playback singing	
1963	Sudu Sande Kalu Wala	Jothipala 'Nondi Jothi'	Playback singing	
1963	Deepashika		Playback singing	
1964	Kala Kala De Pala Pala De		Playback singing	
1964	Sulalitha Sobhani	Soldier	Playback singing	
1964	Samiya Birindage Deviyaya		Playback singing	
1964	Samaje Api Okkoma Samanai		Playback singing	
1964	Sithaka Mahima	yes	Playback singing	
1965	Sapatha Soya	yes	Playback singing	
1965	Hithata Hitha		Playback singing	
1965	Satha Panaha		Playback singing	
1965	Sweep Ticket		Playback singing	
1966	Athulweema Thahanam		Playback singing	
1966	Kinkini Paada		Playback singing	
1966	Seegiri Kashyapa		Playback singing	
1966	Sudu Duva		Playback singing	
1966	Athulweema Thahanam	yes	Playback singing	
1967	Hitha Giya Thena		Playback singing	
1968	Pini Bindu	yes	Playback singing	
1968	London Hamu		Playback singing	
1968	Wanasara		Playback singing	
1968	Amathikama	yes	Playback singing	
1968	Ruhunu Kumari		Playback singing	
1968	Dehadaka Duka		Playback singing	
1969	Oba Nathi nam	yes	Playback singing	
1969	Mee Masso		Playback singing	
1969	Suranyangeth Suraya		Playback singing	
1969	Uthum Sthriya		Playback singing	
1969	Praweshamvanna	yes	Playback singing	
1970	Sumudu Bharya		Playback singing	
1970	Dan Mathakada		Playback singing	
1970	Athma Pooja		Playback singing	
1970	Geetha	Sam	Playback singing	
1970	Ohoma Harida		Playback singing	
1970	Suli Sulang		Playback singing	
1971	Davena Pipasa	yes	Playback singing	
1971	Hathara Denama Surayo		Playback singing	
1971	Abhirahasa	Lover	Playback singing	
1971	Seeye Nottuwa		Playback singing	
1971	Sahanaya	yes		
1972	Adare Hithenawa Dakkama		Playback singing	
1972	Edath Sooraya Adath Sooraya		Playback singing	
1972	Sujeewa	Douglas	Playback singing	
1972	Ada Mehemai		Playback singing	
1972	Hithaka Pipunu Mal		Playback singing	
1972	Lokuma Hindawa	Singer	Playback singing	
1972	Me Desa Kumatada		Playback singing	
1972	Ihatha Athmaya	Singer	Playback singing	
1973	Suhada Pathuma		Playback singing	
1973	Aparadhaya Ha Danduwama		Playback singing	
1973	Thushara		Playback singing	
1973	Sadahatama Oba Mage		Playback singing	
1973	Hathdinnath Tharu		Playback singing	
1973	Hondama Welawa		Playback singing	
1973	Sinawai Inawai		Playback singing	
1973	Sunethra	Ajith	Playback singing	
1973	Hondai Narakai		Playback singing	
1973	Dahakin Ekek		Playback singing	
1973	Hondata Hondai		Playback singing	
1974	Duleeka		Playback singing	
1974	Kasthuri Suwanda		Playback singing	
1974	Dinum Kanuwa	yes	Playback singing	
1974	Sheela		Playback singing	
1974	Surekha		Playback singing	
1974	Kalyani Ganga		Playback singing	
1974	Shanthi	yes	Playback singing	
1974	Onna Babo Billo Enawa		Playback singing	
1974	Susee		Playback singing	
1974	Duppathage Hithawatha		Playback singing	
1974	Lasanda		Playback singing	
1974	Sahayata Danny	Sandun	Playback singing	
1974	Wasthuwa		Playback singing	
1974	Jeewana Ganga		Playback singing	
1974	Rodi Gama		Playback singing	
1975	Hitha Honda Minihek		Playback singing	
1975	Obai Mamai	Sanath	Playback singing	
1975	Pem Kurullo		Playback singing	
1975	Raththaran Amma		Playback singing	
1975	Tharanga		Playback singing	
1975	Awa Soya Adare		Playback singing	
1975	Sukiri Kella	Sumith	Playback singing	
1975	Kohoma Kiyannada		Playback singing	
1975	Cyril Malli		Playback singing	
1975	Mage Nangi Shyama	yes	Playback singing	
1975	Lassana Kella		Playback singing	
1975	Kokilayo		Playback singing	
1975	Gijulihiniyo		Playback singing	
1975	Sooraya Soorayamai		Playback singing	
1975	Ranwan Rekha	yes	Playback singing	
1975	Jeewana Geethaya	yes		
1975	Damayanthi	yes	Playback singing	
1975	Sikuruliya		Playback singing	
1975	Lassana Davasak		Playback singing	
1975	Sadhana	yes	Playback singing	
1975	Hadawathaka Wasanthaya		Playback singing	
1975	Sangeetha		Playback singing	
1976	Pradeepe Ma Wewa		Playback singing	
1976	Nayana	yes	Playback singing	
1976	Kawuda Raja		Playback singing	
1976	Wasana		Playback singing	
1976	Ganga		Playback singing	
1976	Harima Badu Thunak		Playback singing	
1976	Wanarayo		Playback singing	
1976	Unnath Dahai Malath Dahai		Playback singing	
1976	Onna Mame Kella Panapi		Playback singing	
1976	Saradielge Putha		Playback singing	
1976	Adarei Man Adarei		Playback singing	
1976	Nedeyo		Playback singing	
1976	Ran Thilaka		Playback singing	
1977	Neela		Playback singing	
1977	Sakunthala		Playback singing	
1977	Sudu Paraviyo		Playback singing	
1977	Hithuwakkarayo		Playback singing	
1977	Sri Madara		Playback singing	
1977	Hariyanakota Ohama Thama		Playback singing	
1977	Hithuwoth Hithuwamai		Playback singing	
1977	Niluka		Playback singing	
1977	Pembara Madhu		Playback singing	
1977	Chin Chin Nona		Playback singing	
1977	Honda Hitha		Playback singing	
1977	Yali Ipade		Playback singing	
1977	Sajaa		Playback singing	
1977	Sikuru Dasawa	yes		
1977	Chandi Putha		Playback singing	
1977	Aege Adara Kathawa		Playback singing	
1977	Maruwa Samaga Wase		Playback singing	
1977	Tom Pachaya		Playback singing	
1977	Yakadaya		Playback singing	
1978	Sithaka Suwanda		Playback singing	
1978	Chandi Shyama		Playback singing	
1978	Vishmaya		Playback singing	
1978	Madhuwanthi		Playback singing	
1978	Sri Pathula		Playback singing	
1978	Hitha Mithura		Playback singing	
1978	Kundalakeshi		Playback singing	
1978	Tikira		Playback singing	
1978	Sally	yes	Playback singing	
1978	Apsara		Playback singing	
1978	Deepanjali		Playback singing	
1978	Apeksha		Playback singing	
1978	Kumara Kumariyo		Playback singing	
1978	Sasara		Playback singing	
1978	Sandawata Rantharu		Playback singing	
1978	Anupama		Playback singing	
1979	Samanmali		Playback singing	
1979	Geheniyak		Playback singing	
1979	Minisun Athara Minisek		Playback singing	
1979	Jeewana Kandulu		Playback singing	
1979	Amal Biso		Playback singing	
1979	Hingana Kolla		Playback singing	
1979	Raja Kurullo		Playback singing	
1979	Eka Hitha		Playback singing	
1979	Rosa Mal Thunak		Playback singing	
1979	Anusha		Playback singing	
1979	Akke Mata Awasara		Playback singing	
1979	Sugandi		Playback singing	
1979	Sawudan Jema		Playback singing	
1979	Subhani		Playback singing	
1979	Wisihathara Peya		Playback singing	
1979	Hari Pudumai		Playback singing	
1980	Tak Tik Tuk		Playback singing	
1980	Silva		Playback singing	
1980	Ektam Ge		Playback singing	
1980	Seetha		Playback singing	
1980	Adara Rathne		Playback singing	
1980	Doctor Susantha		Playback singing	
1980	Sasaraka Pathum		Playback singing	
1980	Bambara Pahasa		Playback singing	
1980	Muwanpalessa 2		Playback singing	
1980	Raja Dawasak		Playback singing	
1980	Sankhapali		Playback singing	
1980	Sabeetha		Playback singing	
1980	Api Dedena		Playback singing	
1981	Mihidum Sihina		Playback singing	
1981	Ranga		Playback singing	
1981	Sathweni Dawasa		Playback singing	
1981	Valampuri		Playback singing	
1981	Senasuma		Playback singing	
1981	Amme Mata Samawenna		Playback singing	
1981	Ridee Thalla		Playback singing	
1981	Geethika		Playback singing	
1981	Jeewanthi		Playback singing	
1982	Thana Giravi	Dinesh	Playback singing	
1982	Sakvithi Suwaya		Playback singing	
1982	Thani Tharuwa		Playback singing	
1982	Sudu Ayya		Playback singing	
1982	Pethi Gomara		Playback singing	
1982	Eka Diga Kathawak		Playback singing	
1982	Sanasanna Ma		Playback singing	
1982	Anuradha		Playback singing	
1982	Rahasak Nathi Rahasak		Playback singing	
1982	Kiri Suwanda		Playback singing	
1982	Sithara		Playback singing	
1982	Hello Shyama		Playback singing	
1982	Thakkita Tharikita		Playback singing	
1982	Newatha Hamuwemu		Playback singing	
1982	Miss Mallika		Playback singing	
1982	Rail Para		Playback singing	
1983	Ran Mini Muthu		Playback singing	
1983	Sandamali		Playback singing	
1983	Sumithuro	Jayantha Hettiarachchi	Playback singing, Producer	
1983	Samuganimi Ma Samiyani		Playback singing	
1983	Yali Pipunu Malak		Playback singing	
1983	Karate Joe		Playback singing	
1983	Thunhiri al		Playback singing	
1983	Senehasaka Kandulu		Playback singing	
1983	Loku Thaththa		Playback singing	
1983	Mal Madhu		Playback singing	
1983	Muwanpalessa 3		Playback singing	
1983	Hithath Hondai Wadath Hondai		Playback singing	
1983	Bonikko	Inspector		
1984	Kiir Kawadi		Playback singing	
1984	Thaththai Puthai		Playback singing	
1984	Binari Saha Sudu Banda		Playback singing	
1984	Bambara Patikki		Playback singing	
1984	Kokila		Playback singing	
1984	Namal Renu		Playback singing	
1984	Rana Derana		Playback singing	
1984	Hadawathaka Wedana		Playback singing	
1984	Batti		Playback singing	
1984	Ara Soyza		Playback singing	
1984	Birinda		Playback singing	
1984	Jaya Sikurui		Playback singing	
1985	Araliya Mal		Playback singing	
1985	Channai Kello Dennai		Playback singing	
1985	Obata Diwura Kiyannam		Playback singing	
1985	Adarayaka Mahima		Playback singing	
1985	Sudu Mama		Playback singing	
1985	Doo Daruwo		Playback singing	
1985	Kirimaduwal	yes	Playback singing	
1986	Mal Warusa		Playback singing	
1986	Prarthana		Playback singing	
1986	Peralikarayo		Playback singing	
1986	Gimhane Gee Nade		Playback singing	
1986	Jaya Apatai		Playback singing	
1987	Yugayen Yugataya		Playback singing	
1987	Hitha Honda Chandiya		Playback singing	
1987	Kiwulegedara Mohottala		Playback singing	
1987	Yukthiyada Shakthiyada		Playback singing	
1987	Kawuluwa		Playback singing	
1987	Raja Wadakarayo		Playback singing	
1987	Ran Damwal		Playback singing	
1987	Obatai Priye Adare		Playback singing	
1987	Ahinsa		Playback singing	
1988	Chandingeth Chandiya		Playback singing	
1988	Amme Oba Nisa		Playback singing	
1988	Angulimala		Playback singing	
1988	Nawa Gilunath Ban Chun		Playback singing	
1988	Satana		Playback singing	
1989	Mamai Raja		Playback singing	
1989	Badulu Kochchiya		Playback singing	
1989	Waradata Danduwama		Playback singing	
1990	Dese Mal Pipila		Playback singing	
1990	Sambudu Mahima		Playback singing	
1991	Salabak Handai		Playback singing	
1992	Sakvithi Raja		Playback singing	
1992	Roomathiyay Neethiyay		Playback singing	
1993	Chaya		Playback singing	
1997	Vijayagrahanaya		Playback singing	
1998	Aeya Obata Barai		Playback over 15,000 more than singing	
