= Ranidu Lankage =

Ranidu Lankage රනිදු ලංකාගේ
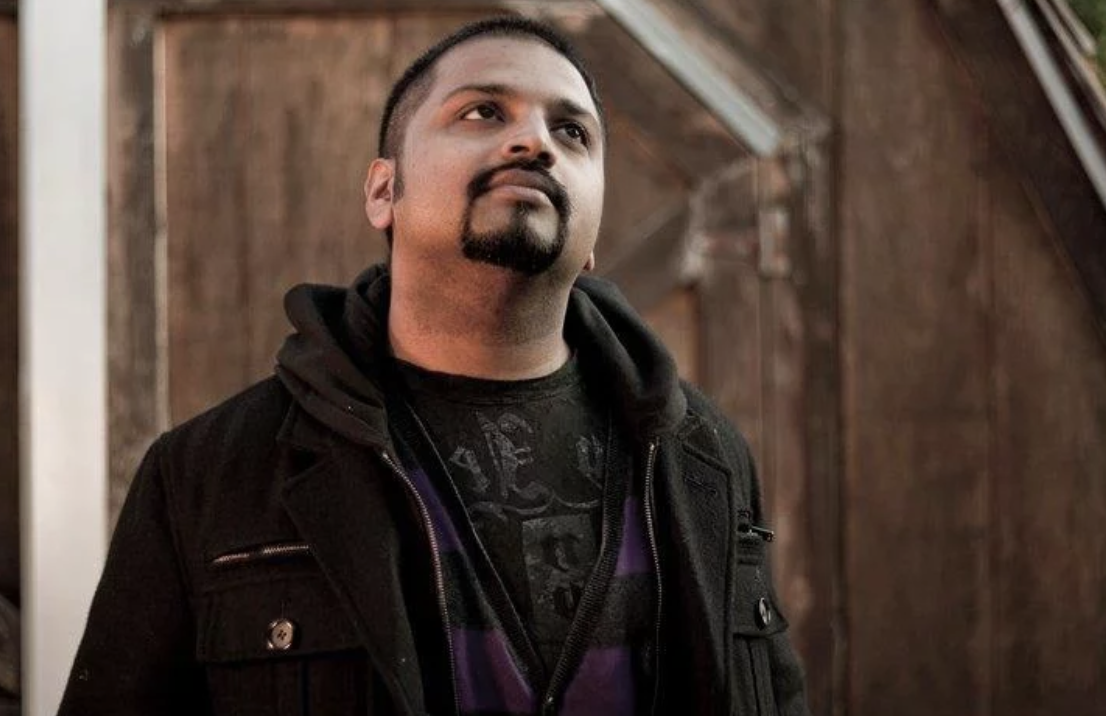
- Ranidu in 2003

Background information
- Born: 1982 Colombo, Sri Lanka
- Genres: Hip hop, Bailatronic
- Occupation: Hip Hop, R&B Artist
- Instruments: Piano, Keyboards, DJ
- Years active: 2003 - Present
- Label: Sony Music India
- Website: www.raniduonline.com

Ranidu Lankage (Sinhala:රනිදු ලංකාගේ) is a Sinhalese R&B and hip hop artist who raised the international profile of Sinhalese RnB/pop. Lankage is the first Sinhalese artist to be played on BBC Radio 1 and the creator of the first Sinhalese single to be played on MTV and channel V and Z music India. He is a graduate in economics from Yale University.

== Education ==
Ranidu was educated at the Royal College, Colombo, where he was ranked, Third in Colombo District in the competitive General Certificate of Education Advanced Level exam in 2000 and went on to study economics at Yale University. He had represented Sri Lanka in squash at the Asian junior championships and played cricket for Royal College.

== Music albums ==
- Hinahenne Mung
- Ranidu
- Diviyapura (All My Life)
- Oba Magemai

== Career ==
Lankage has produced hits that have revolutionised Sri Lankan music. In 2007, DeLon's single "Nasty Girl" debuted at No.36 on the Billboard Charts. Lankage's first single with Ashanthi, "Oba magemai," gained popularity and made Ranidu & Ashanthi the youngest Sri Lankan artists to be signed by an international record label, Sony Music India. Ranidu followed his first single with four Top 20 hits: "Obe ath allagena," "Sinasenna," "Kandulen midee" and "Sadaa." The "Oba Magemai" (You're mine) album, released through M Entertainments label was one of the top-selling albums in Sri Lanka.

In summer 2003, he returned to the studio to create the album "Diviyapura" (All my life) Released in summer 2004, the album included the single "Ahankara Nagare," which climbed to the top of the charts within days and became the biggest original Sri Lankan single in a decade. The song also charted on the BBC's Asian Music list, which led to its becoming the first Sinhalese single to be included in an internationally distributed compilation,.It became one of the most successful albums by a Sri Lankan artist of all time.

Lankage followed up with "Kelle," which landed on the BBC Asian Chart, received rave reviews, and got worldwide airplay.

The album "Iraj" featured three tracks by Lankage, "Ninda noyana handawe", "Madumathiye" and "Playas lounge". Composed and sung by Lankage, "Ninda noyana" was the most popular love ballad to come out in 2005.

In March 2005, Lankage performed at the Sydney Opera House in Australia with Iraj Weeraratne and his group.

That summer, Ranidu embarked on his first major tour in Sri Lanka; all shows were successful. Ranidu collaborated with Iraj to produce " Mata Aloke Genadevi Sansaraye," a Sri Lankan No. 1 that was aired on BBC Radio 1, BBC Asian Network, BBC Radio 1Xtra. Aloke was also included in the "Bombay Bronx" compilation by the BBC's DJ and Ranidu and Iraj's mentor DJ Nihal. Ranidu appeared on the Adil Ray show of the BBC's Asian network to promote the single's inclusion in the station's main playlist.

Ranidu's self-titled third album, which contains Sinhalese Neo Soul, Asian hip hop and reggae music, is the first to combine Sri Lankan music with American- and Caribbean-style Rap. Ranidu sang all the vocals and produced all the tracks. Ranidu collaborated with many artists on this album including Iraj, West coast Rapper DeLon, Anson of the DID Crew from Trinidad, Holee Smokez and the MDT crew from New York, Yohan Rakapakse, Yauwanan, Ranga D and many more. One song, "Herde Keniththuwa" produced by Iraj, was the theme for the 2006 movie "Anjalika". The first official single "Paa salamba sala- ft Anson" was released on Radio 1 and BBC Asian Network in December 2006 and was the first Sinhalese single to be on the "A" list of the Asian network. Lyrics for the album were provided by Bandula Nanayakkarawasam, Chanaka Jayasekera, Kelum Shreemal, Vasantha Dukgannarala and a childhood friend of Ranidu's Anuradha Uduwage. Ranidu along with Iraj and the crew toured the United States, Canada, Australia, Dubai, Cyprus and the UK in support of the album .

He is widely known for introducing Bailatronic.
