= St. Mary's Convent, Matara =

St. Mary Convent
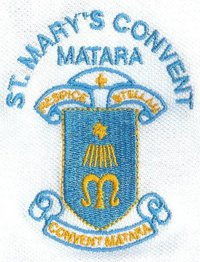
- Matara; Sri Lanka

Information
- Type: Semi Government
- Motto: look at the star
- Established: 1908
- Grades: Girls: 1–13 Boys: 1–3
- Enrollment: Over 4000
- Colors: Light Blue and White
- Website: stmcm.com

St. Mary's School is located in Matara, Sri Lanka. This traditional institution stands for its history, academic excellence and education. Established in the early 20th century by the Sisters of Charity of Jesus and Mary, the school has played an important role in shaping the educational values in the city.

Matara District

== History ==
In 1896, the Sisters of Charity of Jesus and Mary (SCJM) established in Galle, Sri Lanka, and only a SCJM's residence was part of the city for over 11 years. M. Tiburce De Moll, the superior of the Galle Convent proposed a project for its expansion in 1906. Collaborating with the Jesuits, the sisters embarked on the venture, culminating in the completion of the convent and school by 1908. On April 15, 1908, Sr. Josephine Halewijn and Sr. Livine Van Brabant travelled to Matara with four orphans to finalise arrangements.

By April 19, 1908, the remaining sisters and approximately ten orphans had joined them in Matara, coinciding with the Easter season. Originally, the formal opening ceremony of the convent was scheduled on April 21, but it was postponed due to a severe storm. On the following day, Rev. Dr. Van Reeth, the Bishop of Galle, officiated the blessing ceremony, designating Mary Immaculate as the institution's patron saint.

Six sisters were part of the inaugural community: Mr. Armand Landtmeters Sr. Winefred Cahill Sr. Honor Philbin Sr. Josephine, Sr. Wilmer Walker, and Sr. Livine Van Brabant. However, they were not together for a long time. In 1910, Sr. Wilmer relocated to Kegalle to be the rector of another school, while two new sisters arrived from Europe. In 1913, the first superior, Mr. Armand, had to go back to Belgium because of health issues. Her successor, Mr. Ursmer Van Massenhove, who was already living in Matara, oversaw the institution's expansion and increment of its reputation.

Father Roelandt, S.J. assumed the role of architect for the project, designing the original buildings to serve as both a convent and school. Upon the sisters’ arrival in 1908, this project was already completed, reflecting spaciousness and architectural beauty. The inauguration of the orphanage on June 17, 1908, marked a significant achievement. Recognising the lack of space, authorisation was granted in 1912 to expand the complex. By the close of 1913, a larger dormitory and a multipurpose hall utilised for lace making or beeralu classes, accentuated the institution's commitment to growth and community service.

1915: Industrial school turned into an orphanage. The large hall is used as a refectory, gymnastics room, classroom, and at first even as a dormitory. The former dormitory of the orphans was used from then on by the small boys, who were boarders.

1919: Purchase of a piece of land, adjacent to their property. Building of a dormitory. The sanitary facilities and the kitchen were improved, and a big room for the Oblate Sisters was arranged.

1920: New building for the boarders and enlargement of the dormitory, with adjacent verandah.

1921: Inauguration of the grotto and the statue of Our Lady of Lourdes.

1926: Blessing of the new classrooms and the new dormitory.

1927: Blessing of the new orphanage and the new infirmary.

1930: Occupation of 6 new classrooms.

1936: Blessing of the new wing by the Bishop.

1937: Demolition of the old convent. The big chapel is built.

The school started on 1 May 1908. There were 20 pupils in the English school. Besides some general classes, they also taught music and embroidery to older girls and women. In 1910 the English school was already recognized by the State, which was important in order to qualify for subsidies. In 1913, the Marian congregation was established for the pupils of the English school.

The number of boarders was relatively high. At the beginning of the World War I, there were 82 boarders. Their number decreased during the war, which brought about financial difficulties for the sisters. They were forced, among other things, to refuse some orphans. After the war, everything landed on its feet, and in the twenties, there were more than 100 boarders.

There was also a "Cambridge Class", where pupils were prepared for the University of Cambridge in England entrance examinations. In 1929, a Kindergarten was opened, allied to the English school.

The school started on 1 May 1908 with about 100 pupils, of whom 60 followed regular classes. The Sinhalese school and orphanage were recognized in 1911 as Boarding School by the State inspection. This was rather unusual. A special grant was attached to it. In 1911, the Sinhalese school was enlarged with a 6th form, a 7th and 8th year because two teachers of the school had passed their exams for this highest level. From 1923 onwards, a kindergarten was also attached to the Sinhalese school.

The institute is now one of the most important schools in the region. The school for beeralu or lace-making opened its doors on 1 June 1908. The orphans formed the core, but soon many local children came to the industrial school as well. Several times the pupils obtained marvelous prizes in exhibitions of beeralu.
