= Sarath Dassanayake =

Sri Lankan music director

Sarath Dassanayake සරත් දසනායක
- Born: Deepa Milton Sarath Dassanayake; 13 August 1942; Moratuwa, Sri Lanka
- Died: November 18, 1999 (aged 57)
- Education: Don Pedrick Maha Vidyalaya Horana
- Occupations: Actor; composer
- Spouse: Preethi Neela Wijesundara (m. 1970)
- Children: 3
- Parents: Don Dharmapala Dassanayake (father); Malalage Podi Nona Peiris (mother)
- Musical career
- Genres: Pop; soul; rhythm and blues; Indian classical music
- Instrument: sitar
- Years active: 1963–1999

Deepa Milton Sarath Dassanayake (Sinhala:සරත් දසනායක; born 13 August 1942 and died 18 November 1999), popularly known as Sarath Dassanayake, was a Sri Lankan composer, film producer and a renowned musician. One of the pioneer music composers in Sinhala cinema, Dassanayake has contributed to more than around 150 films and 600 film songs as a composer.

== Personal life ==
Dassanayake was born on 13 August 1942 in Katukurunda, Moratuwa as the second of the family. His father Don Dharmapala Dassanayake was a businessman. His mother Malalage Podi Nona Peiris was a teacher. He was educated at Anuruddha Vidyalaya, Nawalapitiya where his mother worked as a teacher and then attended to Nawandama Vidyalaya, Ja-Ela, Shiksadana Vidyalaya, Laksapathi and Hunumulla Central College. Finally he completed education from Horana Buddhist School (currently known as Don Pedrick Maha Vidyalaya Horana). Even though he was not good at studies, he surprisingly passed the Senior Examination in 1957. He has four siblings.

After interrupting school life, he once trained as a mechanic in a garage and as a radio reporter. Then he learned the log and typing. Afterwards, he just applied for the public health inspector exam. Having passed the preliminary inquiry, he went to the Treasury, which is near Parliament, but did not get the job.

He was married to Preethi Neela Wijesundara. He first met Neela during music classes at Government Music College known as Heywood College. Neela studied at Kadugannawa Central College and studied music at the Kandy Music Class. After that, she joined the Government College of Music and followed a six-year course. She learned esraj at the class. After the graduation, Dassanayake worked as a music teacher at Bibila Central College. Dassanayake worked as a music director and Music Inspector in Anuradhapura, Polonnaruwa, Vavuniya, Trincomalee, Jaffna districts in 1966. They married in December 1970. In 1977, he was appointed as the Deputy Director of Aesthetic Education in the Colombo District, while his wife worked as a music instructor at Lumbini Vidyalaya.

The couple has two sons - Ranga and Sanka - and one daughter, Lakmali. Elder son Ranga is a lecturer in sound administration at the University of the Visual and Performing Arts and also a film music director. Daughter Lakmali obtained a degree in English from the University of Delhi. Youngest son Sankha is a talented musician but intellectually disabled.

Dassanayake died on 18 November 1999 at the age of 57 following a brief illness.

== Music career ==
After losing every job, he finally turned to learn music. It was 8 October 1959, where he listened to a nice melody from Horana Sri Palee College. He joined with music classes conducted by music teachers Hewage Premadasa and Weerasena Gunatilleke. His best friend at the music class was Navaratne Aththanayake, who later became the husband of songstress Sujatha Aththanayake. Dassanayake finished music class as an accomplished sitar player under the teachers, K.A. Dayarathna, Lionel Edirisinghe, K.A. Dharmasiri Perera, Gunapala Perera and S.D.S. Jayasekara. He led the orchestra of the music college as well.

Dassanayake first appeared as a sitar player in the 1963 film Udarata Menike under the music direction by R. Muttusamy. Dassanayake was a regular sitar player in the films music directed by Premasiri Khemadasa. Under the guidance of Wahalle Piyathilaka, Dassanayake entered to music direction with the 1972 film Sithijaya. His second film music composing was Vishmaya directed by Charles Perera under the guidance of Somapala Leelananda.

His most memorable music direction came through 1973 blockbuster hit Sadahatama Oba Mage where he was joined to this film by Leelananda again. The film overcomes the challenge of rescuing Sinhala cinema from the Hindustani style and copy music films of the day through a combination of innovative melodies and standalone music. Then in 1974, he produced melodies and music for the film Kasthuri Suwanda directed by Sena Samarasinghe.

He has made many changes to the music industry by producing many popular songs in the film such as "Miyuru Kalpana" and "Irata Akeekaru" in the film Dinum Kanuwa; "Paata Podak Thilakala", "Hada Viman Dorin", "Pemwathiyanne", "Lassana Lokeka Ipadila" in Kasthuri Suwanda; "Ron Soya", "Ranmasu Ran" in Awa Soya Adare; "Lokaye Wenas Wune", "Sal Sapuna", "Ira Sanda Wadala", "Mee Pirunu Suwanda" in Sangeetha and many more. And then in the three decades: seventies, eighty and nineties of Sinhala cinema moved under the music direction of Dassanayake. He was a pioneer in the creation of a new kind of fusion of Sinhala folk and Ragadhari music. Popular singers T.M. Jayarathne, Neela Wickramasinghe, Gratien Ananda and Chandralekha Perera appeared in playback singing for the first time in the films music directed by Dassanayake. He also produced the melody for the song "Samanala Mudune Siripada Simba Simba" penned by President Ranasinghe Premadasa and sung by Jothipala.

Dassanayake won Sarasaviya Awards in 1983 for the Best music direction for the films Athin Athata and then in 1984 for Sasara Chetana. Then he won the Best Music direction awards for the film Muwan Palessa in 1992 and film Chaya in 1993.

He contributed to many of the popular songs of the seventies in radio such as "Punchi Dawaswala Nindata Yaddi" sung by Sujatha Aththanayake. The song mixed with Jayamangala's singing style and simple musical rhythm provide the backdrop to the entire song as the unexpected news of a wedding journey unfolds. He has also used beautiful melodies to a number of classical songs such as "Bol Vee Ahuru" (Amradeva), "Pem Sililare" (Amara-Dayaratne), "Roossa Gaha Langa" (Vijaya), "Kande Vihare" (Chandralekha), "Serayatiyen Api" (Vijaya-Chandralekha) and "Randu Wewi Yalu Wewi" (Sunil-Chandrika).

Apart from music direction, he was also a film producer. He produced popular films Madhu Sihina, Mihidum Sihina and Aathma.

On 17 November 2015, the "Sarath Siritha and Harasara" ceremony was held at Tharangani Cinema, Bauddhaloka Mawatha, Colombo 7.

== Filmography ==
Year	Film	Roles
1963	Udarata Menike	Sitarist
1967	Rena Giraw	Sitarist
1972	Sithijaya	Music composer
1973	Sadahatama Oba Mage	Music composer
1974	Kasthuri Suwanda	Music composer
1974	Dinum Kanuwa	Music composer
1975	Awa Soya Adare	Music composer
1975	Sangeetha	Music composer
1976	Vanarayo	Music composer
1976	Duhulu Malak	Music composer
1976	Unnath Dahai Malath Dahai	Music composer
1976	Nilla Soya	Music composer
1977	Hithuwoth Hithuwamai	Music composer
1977	Eya Dan Loku Lamayek	Music composer
1977	Chandi Putha	Music composer
1977	Yakadaya	Music composer
1978	Vishmaya	Music composer
1978	Madhuwanthi	Music composer
1978	Asha Dasin	Music composer
1978	Hitha Mithura	Music composer
1978	Kumara Kumariyo	Music composer
1979	Samanmali	Music composer
1979	Jeewana Kandulu	Music composer
1979	Amal Biso	Music composer
1979	Chuda Manikya	Music composer
1979	Anusha	Music composer
1979	Nuwan Renu	Music composer
1980	Mal Kekulu	Music composer
1980	Tak Tik Tuk	Music composer
1980	Silva	Music composer
1980	Ektam Ge	Music composer
1980	Sasaraka Pathum	Music composer
1980	Bambara Pahasa	Music composer
1980	Dandu Monara	Music composer
1980	Muwan Palessa 2	Music composer
1980	Raja Dawasak	Music composer
1980	Sankhapali	Music composer
1981	Situ Kumariyo	Music composer
1981	Suriyakantha	Music composer
1981	Amme Mata Samawenna	Music composer
1981	Geethika	Music composer
1981	Samawenna	Music composer
1981	Chanchala Rekha	Music composer
1982	Mihidum Sihina	Music composer, Producer
1982	Thana Giravi	Music composer
1982	Sakvithi Suwaya	Music composer
1982	Thani Tharuwa	Music composer
1982	Ayachana	Music composer
1982	Jeewithayen Jeewithayak	Music composer
1982	Major Sir	Music composer
1982	Newatha Hamuwemu	Music composer
1982	Kadawunu Poronduwa remake	Music composer
1983	Ran Mini Muthu	Music composer
1983	Chandira	Music composer
1983	Sandamali	Music composer
1983	Sumithuro	Music composer
1983	Samuganimi Ma Samiyani	Music composer
1983	Yali Pipunu Malak	Music composer
1983	Niliyakata Pem Kalemi	Music composer
1983	Athin Athata	Music composer
1983	Pasamithuro	Music composer
1983	Menika Maliga	Music composer
1983	Mal Madhu	Music composer
1983	Sumithuro	Music composer
1984	Parasathuro	Music composer
1984	Niwan Dakna Jathi Dakwa	Music composer
1984	Hitha Honda Kollek	Music composer
1984	Bambara Patikki	Music composer
1984	Hithawathiya	Music composer
1984	Sasara Chethana	Music composer
1984	Rana Derana	Music composer
1984	Batti	Music composer
1984	Birinda	Music composer
1984	Jaya Sikurui	Music composer
1985	Aeya Waradida Oba Kiyanna	Music composer
1985	Rosy	Music composer
1986	Yali Hamuwennai	Music composer
1986	Prarthana	Music composer
1986	Asipatha Mamai	Music composer
1986	Devuduwa	Music composer
1986	Dinuma	Music composer
1987	Thaththi Man Adarei	Music composer
1987	Yukthiyada Shakthiyada	Music composer
1987	Ran Dam Wal	Music composer
1987	Obatai Priye Adare	Music composer
1987	Ahinsa	Music composer
1988	Rasa Rahasak	Music composer
1988	Gedara Budun Amma	Music composer
1988	Angulimala	Music composer
1988	Satana	Music composer
1988	Nawatha Api Ekwemu	Music composer
1990	Dese Mal Pipila	Music composer
1990	Dedunnen Samanaliyak	Music composer
1990	Pem Rajadahana	Music composer
1990	Madhu Sihina	Music composer, Producer
1991	Sihina Ahase Wasanthaya	Music composer
1991	Salambak Handai	Music composer
1991	Dhanaya	Music composer
1991	Suwadena Suwandak	Music composer
1992	Ranabime Veeraya	Music composer
1992	Sakkara Suththara	Music composer
1992	Sinha Raja	Music composer
1992	Kiyala Wadak Na	Music composer
1992	Suranimala	Music composer
1992	Sathya	Music composer
1992	Muwan Palesse Kadira	Music composer
1992	Sinhayangeth Sinhaya	Music composer
1992	Ahimi Dadaman	Additional composer
1993	Chaya	Music composer
1993	Prathigya	Music composer
1993	Sasara Sarisarana Thek	Music composer
1993	Yasasa	Music composer
1993	Sandarekha	Music composer
1994	Sujatha	Music composer
1994	Mawubime Veerayo	Music composer
1994	150 Mulleriyawa	Music composer
1994	Aathma	Producer
1995	Dalulana Gini	Music composer
1995	Rodaya	Music composer
1996	Hitha Honda Nam Waradin Na	Music composer
1996	Mana Mohini	Music composer
1996	Mal Hathai	Music composer
1996	Bithu Sithuwam	Music composer
1997	Surayo Wadakarayo	Music composer
1997	Sudu Akka	Music composer
1997	Pem Mal Mala	Music composer
1997	Good Bye Tokyo	Music composer
1999	Ayadimi Sama	Music composer
1999	Seetha Samire	Music composer
1999	Nagaran	Music composer
2000	Danduwama	Music composer
2000	Hansa Vilapaya	Music composer
2001	Oba Koheda Priye	Music composer
2001	Dinuma Kageda	Music composer
2002	Seethala Gini Kandu	Music composer
2003	Vala In London	Music composer
2006	Rana Hansi	Music composer
2017	Kota Uda Express	Music composer
