= Sabeetha Perera =

Sri Lankan actress (born 1962)

- සබීතා පෙරේරා
- Born: Warnakulasuriya Uswattha Liyanage Sabeetha Janaki Perera; 1 December 1962 (age 63); Wennappuwa, Sri Lanka
- Education: Visakha Vidyalaya
- Occupation: Film actress
- Years active: 1967 – present
- Spouse: Don Upali Jayasinghe (m. 1998)
- Children: 1
- Parents: Stanley Perera (father); Girley Gunawardana (mother)
- Awards: Sarasaviya Best Actress Award; Sarasaviya Most Popular Actress Award
- Website: Sabeetha Perera on Facebook

Warnakulasuriya Uswaththa Liyanage Sabeetha Janaki Perera (born December 1, 1962) is an actress in Sri Lankan cinema and old Lollywood cinema of Pakistan. She is the most successful female superstar of the '80s and '90s in Sinhala cinema. Sabeetha has received a number of awards for her acting, including the Sarasaviya, OCIC, Presidential and the Swarna Shanka.

== Personal life ==
Sabeetha was born on 1 December 1962 as the third of the four daughters to famous actor and director Anthony Stanley Perera and famous actress Girley Gunawardana. She has two elder sisters - Sandya, Sadna and one younger sister, Chandima. They lived in their mother's hometown, Mount Lavinia in early days and attended Visakha Montessori for primary education and then Visakha Vidyalaya, Colombo. After few years, they moved to their father's home town Wennappuwa and completed her secondary education from Holy Family Convent, Wennappuwa.

She is married to Upali Jayasinghe, the managing director of D.P. Jayasinghe and the company.

== Acting career ==
Sabeetha started her cinema career at the age of 3 years, when she played the role of daughter in her own father's film Ivasana Dana. Then she acted as the daughter of her own mother in the film Hathara Kendaraya. After the role in Yasapalitha Nanayakkara's film `Rosy, Sabeetha staged Pakistani film career. The Sinhala titled Sadaakal Randeva which was based on the novel Never say Good Bye screened in Pakistan as Kabi Al Vidana Kena. The film became a blockbuster hit in both countries as well. This induced Pakistani film makers to introduce Sabeetha for further Pakistani films and she completed 17 Urdu films at the end.

Sabita joins Pakistani cinema in 1986 to win Best Actress at the Alsakar Film Festival in Pakistan that same year for her Urdu film Nadiya. After her first Pakistani film Sadaakal Randeva, she then acted many Pakistani films such as Nadiya, Zameen Aur Aasman, Sabke Baap, Mashbu, Aagh Hi Aagh, Ruby, Donkaraya, Ayya Nago, Sebaliyo, Okkoma Hawul and Chandi Kello. Some of these are collaborated production works by Sri Lanka and Pakistan. Sabeetha won most popular award at Pakistan film festival for her role in the film Bobby. She also awarded with Al-Shakar Award for the Best Actress at the festival for her role in film Nadiya.

The first dramatic role of Sabeetha came through the film Deveni Gamana. For the role, she was awarded with Best Actress at the 1985 Sarasaviya Awards. Then her critically acclaimed roles came through Viragaya and Sisisa Gini Gani films. The role Bathee in Viragaya and Annette in Sisila Gini Gani are rated as the best ever roles played by Sabeetha.

Though she actively engaged in cinema industry more often, she also acted few television serials, such as Ran Kahawanu, Pitagamkarayo, Esala Kaluwara, Akala Sandya and Bharyawo. Sabeetha also acted in the stage drama Age Nama Rathi.

== Filmography ==
- No. denotes the Number of Sri Lankan film in the Sri Lankan cinema.

Year	No.	Film	Role	Ref.
1967	157	Hathara Kendare	Daughter	
1967	174	Iwasana Dana	Daughter	
1968	Kannada	Goa Dalli CID 999		
1977	379	Tom Pachaya	Young Chaminda	
1979	Tamil	Nangooram	Meena	
1980	464	Sabeetha	Sabeetha	
1981	500	Bangali Walalu	Yaso	
1982	505	Sanda	Sanda	
1982	510	Sakvithi Suwaya	Violet	
1982	519	Sanasanna Ma		
1982	526	Kiri Suwanda	Secretary	
1982	537	Paramitha	Chammi	
1982	539	Nawatha Hamuwemu	Neetha	
1983	545	Chandira	Chandira	
1983	Pakistani	Kabhi Alwida Na Kehna		
1983	549	Siv Ranga Sena		
1983	560	Hasthi Viyaruwa	Yaso	
1983	571	Monara Thenna 2		
1984	580	Adare Geethaya	Iresha	
1984	581	Deveni Gamana	Sujatha	
1984	592	Podi Ralahami		
1984	Pakistani	Bobby		
1984	598	Ammai Duwai		
1984	605	Ara Soysa	Shanthi	
1984	Pakistani	Miss Colombo		
1985	612	Mihidum Salu	Sumedha	
1985	616	Araliya Mal	Nangi	
1985	617	Raththaran Kanda		
1985	633	Sadakal Randewa		
1985	620	Channai Kello Dennai		
1985	626	Rosy		
1985	634	Kiri Maduwal		
1986	Pakistani	Bangkok Ke Chor		
1986	635	Yali Hamuwennai	Ranji	
1986	Pakistani	Ruby		
1986	641	Dushyanthi	Dushyanthi	
1986	Pakistani	Miss Bangkok		
1987	654	Hitha Honda Chandiya	Kusala	
1987	Pakistani	Nijat		
1987	658	Podi Wije		
1987	Pakistani	Himmatwala		
1987	663	Kawuluwa		
1987	Pakistani	Manila Ki Bijliyan		
1987	667	Viragaya	Bathee	
1987	Pakistani	Ek Say Barh Kar Ek		
1987	669	Dhonkaraya		
1988	Pakistani	Hungama		
1988	671	Rasa Rahasak	Ruvini	
1988	Pakistani	Aag Hi Aag		
1988	672	Ayya Nago		
1988	Pakistani	Khan Pa Japan Kay		
1988	684	Wana Rajina		
1989	685	Mamai Raja	Ruwanika	
1989	695	Sebaliyo		
1989	691	Nommara 17	Vasanthi / Vasanthi's mother (Double Acting)	
1990	697	Dase Mal Pipila		
1990	698	Thanha Asha	Lalani	
1990	711	Chandi Raja		
1991	717	Uthura Dakuna	Sabeetha	
1991	723	Obata Pamanai Adare		
1991	730	Love In Bangkok	Roshen, Shalika	
1991	734	Cheriyo Doctor	Surangi	
1991	739	Bambara Kalpaya		
1991	743	Sisila Gini Gani	Annette	
1992	746	Raja Daruwo	Sharine Jayasekara	
1992	747	Bajar Eke Chandiya		
1992	749	Sakvithi Raja		
1992	750	Sakkara Suththara		
1992	753	Chandi Rajina		
1992	758	Okkoma Kanapita	Manika	
1992	765	Sinhayangeth Sinhaya	Neetha	
1992	767	Rajek Wage Puthek		
1993	768	Ottui Baruwata		
1993	769	Chaya	Chaya Jayasinghe	
1993	776	Sasara Sarisarana Thek Oba Mage		
1993	778	Surayan Athara Veeraya	Nirmala	
1993	Pakistani	Mazboot		
1993	780	Come O Go Chicago	Mali	
1993	784	Bambasara Bisaw		
1993	791	Madara Parasathu		
1994	Pakistani	Zameen Aasmaan	Sabeetha	
1994	804	Sujatha		
1994	813	Athma	Athma / Subha	
1994	818	Hello My Darling		
1994	Pakistani	Sab Ke Baap		
1995	829	Wairayen Wairaya		
1995	823	Chandi Kello		
1995	830	Demodara Palama	Manori	
1995	832	Chitti		
1995	839	Cheriyo Captain	Varuni	
1996	852	Veediye Veeraya		
1996	854	Bawa Sasara		
1996	855	Saba Mihtura		
1996	866	Mana Mohini	Mohini 'Sangeetha' / Rajiv's Aunt	
1997	English	Blendings		
1997	Tamil	Isai Payanam		
1998	896	Vimukthi		
1998	Pakistani	Khatarnak Haseena		
1999	925	Mandakini		
1999	927	Okkoma Kapatiyo		
2000	942	Sanda Yahanata	Viveka	
2001	950	Oba Koheda Priye	Nilmini and Nimmi	
2001	951	Oba Magema Wewa	Poornaa	
2002	993	Sathkampa	Kumari	
2003	1002	Vala In London	Nayomi	
2007	1091	Hai Master		
2008	1111	Aba	Princess Unmaada Chithra	
2009	1120	Dancing Star		
2010	1123	Kawulu Dora		
2010	Pakistani	Jan Tun Pyara		
2015	1233	Maharaja Ajasath	Kosala Devi	
2015	1238	Address Na	Mudukkuwe Sandya	
2026	1255	Vihanga Premaya	Malini	

== Awards ==
=== Sarasavi Awards ===
Year	Nominee / work	Award	Result
1985	Deveni Gamana	Best Actress Award	Won
1987		Most Popular Actress	Won
1989		Most Popular Actress	Won

=== Presidential Awards ===
Year	Nominee / work	Award	Result
		Up and Coming Actress Award	Won
1988	Podi Wije	Best Actress Award	Won
1992	Sisila Gini Gani	Best Actress Award	Won

=== Derana Sunsilk Film Awards ===
Year	Nominee / work	Award	Result
2016	Address Na	Best Actress in a Supportive Role	Won

=== Pakistani Film Corporation ===
Year	Nominee / work	Award	Result
2008		Special Award for Contribution	Won
