= Nommara 17 =

Nommara 17 නොම්මර 17
- Directed by: Hemasiri Sellapperuma
- Written by: Preethiraj Weeraratne
- Based on: Preethiraj Weeraratne
- Produced by: Weeraratne Enterprises
- Starring: Vijaya Kumaratunga; Sanath Gunathilake; Jeewan Kumaranatunga
- Cinematography: M. A. Gafoor
- Edited by: M. S. Aliman
- Music by: Ernest Soysa
- Distributed by: CEL Theatres
- Release date: 21 July 1989
- Running time: 1h 47m
- Country: Sri Lanka
- Language: Sinhala
- Box office: 3 SL Crores

Nommara 17 (Sinhala: නොම්මර 17) is a 1989 Sri Lankan Sinhala action thriller film directed by Hemasiri Sellapperuma and produced by Preethiraj Weeraratne for Weeraratne Enterprises. It stars Vijaya Kumaratunga, Sanath Gunathilake and Jeewan Kumaranatunga in lead roles along with Mervyn Jayathunga, Wilson Karunaratne, Sabeetha Perera, Menik Kurukulasooriya and Freddie Silva. The music was composed by Ernest Soysa. It is the 691st film in the Sinhala cinema.

The film was screened after the assassination of lead actor Vijaya Kumaratunga, which influenced the fans to come and watch his famous movie star for the last time on the silver screen. Thus recorded as one of the huge blockbuster hit in Sinhala cinema. It successfully passed 200 days at theatres. In 17th Sarasaviya Awards in 1989 the film won the award for the Most Popular Film with 40,535 votes.

== Plot ==
SP Jayasinghe arrests a criminal, Mervyn, who is later sentenced to life imprisonment. Inspector has three sons Vijaya, Naatha and Mahesh. He gifts same chains to them. To take revenge, Mervyn escapes from prison and shoots SP to death at his home. Vijaya and Naatha escape from there while Mahesh gets adopted by Jayasinghe's friend, IP Sabaratnam. Another thief, Wilson takes care of Vijaya and Naatha to earn money. One day, Mervyn kidnaps IP Sabaratnam's daughter, Vasanthi. Wilson forces Vijaya to robber from a house. However, Vijaya gets arrested and Wilson manages to escape.

Years later, Vijaya who known as "Nommara 17", releases from jail with his friend, Potato who known as "Nommara 13". He determines to find Wilson and is against injustice. Now, Naatha is grown into a head of gangster and Mahesh working as an Inspector. Vasanthi has been adopted by Mervyn, who is now doing drug business with Wilson. Eventually, Vijaya and Vasanthi fall in love. Soon, Vijaya and Mahesh become friends. At Mahesh's home, Vijaya sees SP Jayasinghe's photo and realizes that Mahesh is his brother. Two brothers are reunited and they promise to find Mervyn and Wilson. They punish Wilson, but is caught by Naatha. While punishing them, Naatha notices Vijaya's chain and realizes that Vijaya and Mahesh are his long lost brothers and reunites with them.

Mervyn and Wilson kidnap three brothers and Vasanthi saves them. Upon learning that, Mervyn and Wilson fight with them. However, Mervyn is stabbed and Mahesh's foster mother asks him about her daughter. Mervyn reveals Vasanthi about her mother and dies uniting them. Vijaya, Naatha and Mahesh manage to defeat Wilson, but Naatha is shot while saving Vijaya. Naatha dies uniting his wife with Mahesh. The film ends with the family's reunion.

== Cast ==
- Vijaya Kumaratunga as Vijaya aka 'Nommara 17'
  - Kanchana Wicramasekara as Child Vijaya
- Sanath Gunathilake as Naatha
  - Harindra Sanka Peiris as Child Naatha
- Jeevan Kumaratunga as Inspector Mahesh
  - Rakith Waravitage as Child Mahesh
- Mervyn Jayathunga as Mervyn Jayasekera
- Wilson Karunaratne as Wilson
- Sabeetha Perera as Vasanthi / Mrs Sabarathnam
  - Rishini Weerarathne as Child Vasanthi
- Menik Kurukulasuriya as Radha
- Freddie Silva as Potato aka 'Nommara 13'
- Manel Chandralatha as Samanthie
- Mahesh Jayasinghe as Brinjol
- Lakmal Fonseka as Sooppuwa
- Teddy Vidyalankara as Teddy
- Srinath Maldeniya as Police Chief
- Ananda Basnayake as Inspector Jayasinghe, Vijaya, Naatha and Mahesh's father
- Preethiraj Weeraratne as Inspector Sabarathnam
- Kapila Sigera
- Gamini Kumar
- Lal Kumar
- Alan Balasuriya
- Dayananda Vidyalankara
- P. Nihal Fernando

== Production ==
The filming began in 1987. During writing the screenplay of the film, Preethiraj specially made the lead character Vijay to Vijaya Kumaratunga. Because he was the hero in Sri Lankan cinema at that time. However, before the screening, Vijaya Kumaratunga was Assassinted.

== Soundtrack ==
No.	Title	Singer(s)	Length
1.	"Sigiri Lalitha Landune"	Vijaya Kumaratunga, Angeline Gunathilake	4:54
2.	"Pata Sarungal"	Vijaya Kumaratunga, Freddie Silva	4:54
3.	"Dewa Pidewa"	Gratien Ananda, Angeline Gunathilake and crew	5:18
4.	"Meda Sale Bandanne"	Vijaya Kumaratunga, Angeline Gunathilake, Gratien Ananda	4:54
5.	"Anangaya"	Angeline Gunathilake, Freddie Silva	8:21

== Reception ==
There was a big uproar in the cinema halls during the screening of the film. People were at queue at cinema halls from 8 am to witness Vijaya's last film. There have even been stabbing incidents recorded in 'Gemunu' and 'Manel' cinema theaters as well. The film was screened for 210 days at the 'National' cinema hall in Maharagama as well as it was screened in the opening cinemas for 200 days.

== Awards ==
Year	Award	Category	Recipient	Result
1989	Sarasaviya Awards	Most Popular Film	Nommara 17	Won
