= Iraj Weeraratne =

- Born: 21 February 1981 (age 45); Colombo, Sri Lanka
- Education: Royal College, Colombo; Northumbria University
- Occupations: Rapper; Music Producer; DJ
- Musical career
- Genres: Hip hop; Pop; R&B; Electronic; Indian Pop
- Instruments: Piano; Synthesizer; Drum Machine; DJ
- Years active: 2003–present
- Labels: M-Entertainments; Ill Noize Records; Sony BMG

Iraj Weeraratne (born 21 February 1981), known professionally as IRAJ, while recognised for introducing Sinhala and Tamil rap to the local music scene, his career has been overshadowed by controversies involving political affiliations, misinformation, and hate speech allegations.

== Career ==
Weeraratne was educated at Royal College, Colombo and later claimed to have studied at Northumbria University, although this remains unverified. He won a best keyboardist award from Guildhall Music School at the age of 16 and formed the band Zealots with his schoolmates, including Ranidu Lankage.

He composed music for the 2009 Tamil film Vettaikaaran, but later faced legal issues during a trip to Chennai in connection to the project.

In 2020, he was appointed to the Board of the National Youth Services Council by Namal Rajapaksa, a move that was widely criticised due to his lack of relevant experience. He resigned in 2021 citing "work-related commitments".

== Political affiliations and backlash ==
Weeraratne has been a vocal supporter of the Rajapaksa family, especially Gotabaya Rajapaksa and Namal Rajapaksa. During the 2022 Sri Lankan protests, he used social media to defend the government and criticise protestors, which resulted in widespread public backlash. His residence in Kirulapone was vandalised by protestors in May 2022.

He has been accused of participating in coordinated propaganda efforts and spreading disinformation. In 2021, Facebook removed his page over fake news allegations involving COVID-19 antigen test kits.

He hosts Bai Thaksalawa, an online talk show streamed on his YouTube channel Iraj Show, which he co-presents with political commentator Milinda Rajapaksa and which focuses on interviews and discussions related to Sri Lankan politics, public affairs, and current events.

In March 2025, Weeraratne was summoned by Sri Lanka’s Cyber Crimes Division over a video in which he alleged fraudulent donation requests related to the Temple of the Tooth.

== Recent controversies ==
In 2023, civil organisations in Australia petitioned against one of his concerts, accusing him of hate speech, political propaganda, and discriminatory views, particularly toward marginalised communities.

In February 2025, Weeraratne took legal action against individuals who insulted him and his family on social media platforms.

== Discography ==
=== Albums ===
- Iraj – MEntertainments (2010)
- Chapter 02: Aloke – MEntertainments (2013)
- Manamali (2017)
