= Premnath Moraes =

Sri Lankan dramatist (1923–1998)

Premnath Moraes ප්‍රේම්නාත් මොරායස්
- Born: Joseph Peter Moraes Fernando; 31 January 1923; Colombo, British Ceylon
- Died: 24 May 1998 (aged 75); Colombo, Sri Lanka
- Education: St. Benedict's College, Colombo; Maris Stella College
- Occupations: Film actor. director, singer, lyricist, weightlifter, journalist
- Years active: 1947–1998

Joseph Peter Moraes Fernando (born 31 January 1923 – died 24 May 1998 as Sinhala: ප්‍රේම්නාත් මොරායස්), popularly known as Premnath Moraes, was an actor, film director and scriptwriter in Sri Lankan cinema as well as appeared in versatile forms: singer, lyricist, film production executive, weightlifter, athlete, gymnast, journalist and sports administrator.

== Personal life ==
Moraes was born on 31 January 1923 in Colombo in a Tamil Catholic family. He first attended to St. Benedict's College, Colombo, but the school was later moved to Veyangoda due to World War II. Therefore, his family moved to Negombo and attended to Maris Stella College. During his school times, he excelled sports and the arts where he represented St. Benedict's Cricket and Soccer teams. Moraes is also a Public Schools Athlete and was 'Baseman' in the walking Pyramid of the gymnastic Troupe. As a student in Maris Stella, he captained football team, played cricket and appointed as the Head Prefect. He represented Ceylon against the Allies in weightlifting still as a schoolboy. Even though he was trained for the 'Mr. Ceylon' contest, he sustained injuries during an escape and helping other in a fire in the Regal Cinema complex.

Soon after school, he joined the Police force. Later he was seconded to the CID. However, he spoke openly at the funeral of a colleague gunned down when leading an unarmed raid, Moraes was sacked from the police. He dated songstress Rita Genevieve Fernando popularly known as Latha Walpola, but Moraes was a strict person, once strongly accused Latha of singing a song with Dharmadasa Walpola at a concert. As a result, Latha became angry and ended the love affair.

He died on 24 May 1998 at the age of 75.

== Career ==
After leaving the police, he became a reporter of the Times of Ceylon newspaper. During this period, he met his childhood friend Sangare Sellamuttu who later became the Mayor of Colombo. Sellamuttu introduced Moraes to renowned film producer Chittampalam Abraham Gardiner. In 1940, he became a cinema manager affiliated with Ceylon Theaters and later held various positions in the company. In 1953, he started acting and writing dialogues and script for the film Eda Rae and also sang for the first time. After that, he acted in two blockbusters Warada Kageda and Kapati Arakshakaya. After that, he went India and attended to Shantiniketan the Centre of Arts north of Calcutta founded by Rabindranath Tagore.

In 1948, he joined a Sports Club known as MCC in Kotahena and played soccer. Moraes was the first General Secretary of the Old Bens Sports Club and later served under the Presidencies of Colonel Sydney Jayawardena, Dougie Livera and Granville Perera. He also became a Sports administrator in Basketball and Hockey. During his tenure, he brought Ceylon National Hockey Team to Delhi. In 1959, he directed his maiden film Sri 296.

During this period, he met several Indian composers such as Ravi Shankar. Later he moved to Bombay joined with Raj Kapoor–Nargis circle. Moraes became a close friend of Bollywood actor Dilip Kumar. After returning to Sri Lanka, he excelled as a singer where he contracted to the His Master's Voice label and recorded few solos as well as duets with Latha Walpola and Chitra Somapala. Some of his popular songs include: 'Sri Lanka Rani Meniye' and 'Lak Deepe'. In the meantime in 1953, Moraes became the production assistant as well as second unit Director for the Hollywood film Elephant Walk directed by William De Telle. Then he had two short stints as second unit Director for United Artists film Captain’s Table and Purple Plains.

He was Production Manager at Gemini Studios in Madras at that time. Under Moraes guidance, many Sinhala films were edited, dubbed and produced at Gemiini Studios. He also introduced Gamini Fonseka to Lester James Peiris, where Fonseka received a non-starring role in Lester's film Rekava where Moraes was the Production Manager. In 1978, Moraes directed the Tamil Film Vaadai Kaatru. In 1979 at the 6th OCIC Award Ceremony, he won the Merit award for Best Director (Tamil) category. Meanwhile, he worked as the sports editor of the Daily Mirror newspaper and also served as a copy writer in advertising industry. In 1998, he was honored with 'Namaskara Pooja' Special Award at the 25th Sarasaviya Awards.

== Filmography ==
Year	Film	Roles	Ref.
1948	Kapati Arakshakaya		
1953	Eda Rae	Dialogue Writer, Lakdasa	
1954	Warada Kageda	Production Manager	
1954	Radala Piliruwa	John	
1956	Rekava	Production Manager	
1959	Sri 296	Director, screenwriter	
1966	Sigiri Kashyapa	Director	
1971	Kathuru Muwath	Prosecutor	
1975	Hitha Honda Minihek	Film director	
1975	Kaludiya Dahara	Assistant Director	
1976	Kolamba Sanniya	Screenwriter	
1977	Siripala Saha Ranmenika	Prosecutor	
1978	Vaadai Kaatru	Director	
1986	Koti Waligaya		
1995	Demodara Palama	Jail Superintendent	
1997	Apaye Thathpara Asu Haradahak		
