= Herbie Seneviratne =

Sri Lankan actor and filmmaker (1925-1998)

Herby Seneviratne හර්බි සෙනෙවිරත්න
- Born: Richard Herbert Seneviratne; 5 July 1925; Kurunegala, British Ceylon
- Died: 2 March 1998 (aged 72); Kurunegala, Sri Lanka
- Resting place: \
- Education: St. Anne's College; Maris Stella College
- Occupations: Film actor, filmmaker
- Years active: 1945–1991
- Spouse: June Seneviratne
- Children: 5
- Relatives: Shanthi Kumar (brother)

Richard Herbert Seneviratne (born 5 July 1925 – died 2 March 1998 as Sinhala: හර්බි සෙනෙවිරත්න), popularly known as Herby Seneviratne, was an actor and filmmaker in Sri Lankan cinema.

== Personal life ==
Herbert was born on 5 July 1925 in Lihinigiri Palace, Kurunegala, Sri Lanka. His mother was from Subasinghe family of Sandalankawa. He was educated at St. Anne's College, Kurunegala and later from Maris Stella College, Negombo. His elder brother Shanthi Kumar is also a renowned filmmaker and actor in early Sinhala cinema. Shanthi died on 22 February 1967 at the age of 50.

In 1954, Herbie married his cousin June and had five children.

He died on 2 March 1998 in Kurunegala at the age of 72.

== Career ==
In the early 1940s, Herbie went to India and resided in Calcutta. During this period, he studied Buddhism and philosophy Neluwe Sri Gunananda Thero at Jaya Sri Maha Bodhi temple. He joined the "Institute of Drama" in Calcutta and studied stage drama. He also had a 1 and 1/2 years of study at the Shantiniketan of the Rabindranath Tagore. Meanwhile, Herbie was introduced to Shirker by Sam Perera which allowed Herbie to go to New Theaters in Calcutta. In 1944, he met Indian cinematographer and filmmaker Bimal Roy. During this period, Bimal prepared to make the film Anjangarh. Herbie told Bimal that he loves acting. After seeing his passion for acting, Bimal gave a role to Herbie in his film Anjangarh. As he was fluent in Hindi language, Herbie played the role of a village leader along with Bollywood artists Sunanda Banerjee and Tulsi Chakraborty.

While he was starring in the film, he received a telegram from his brother Shanthi Kumar asking him to come to the Victoria Hotel in Madras and meet soon. Shanthi Kumar informed Herbie about his upcoming film Asokamala where he has reserved a sub-main role for Herbie. The two arrived in Sri Lanka and left for India on 9 October 1946, via Talai Mannar with a crew about forty others. Then Shanthi Kumar made the first Sinhala talkie film with the help of M. Somsundaram, who was the head of Jupiter Pictures as well as Central Studios in Madras.

Then, Herbie joined with Minerva Music Troupe led by B. A. W. Jayamanne and Hugo Fernando. Later he made the lead role in the film Kapati Arakshakaya. The film was shot at the Southern Studio in Mylaser. In the film, he sang the popular song 'Pinsara Mage Soyura' along with Rukmani Devi. Herbie also sang a baila song with Latha Walpola in his brother's second film Eda Rae. Along with Rukmani, Herbie acted in many films in the lead role including Veradunu Kurumanama, Peralena Iranama, Hadisi Vinischaya, Segawunu Pilithura and Iranganie. He also played the lead role in the film Sansare and Radala Piliruwa with Rita Ratnayake.

However, his most notable acting came alongside Kanthi Gunatunga where they acted in the films Vana Mohini, Suraya and Surasena. The song 'Dutu Da Idala Luhu Banda' sung with Kanthi in the film Suraya became very popular. The film Surasena was created in six languages and simultaneously filmed with all six languages. The original Tamil version, Malai Kallan(1954) featured M.G. Ramachandran (MGR) as the hero.Dilip Kumar played the lead role in Hindi adaptation Asad(1955). Every film that Herbie starred in was a Cinemas Production. He also acted in the film Veera Vijaya which is the last Sinhala film produced in India. In this film, Herbie became the first cinema boyfriend of Jeevarani Kurukulasuriya.

In 1961, he made his maiden cinema direction with the film Daruwa Kageda. Then he acted and directed the films Suhada Divi Piduma (1962), Sudu Sande Kalu Wala (1963), and Samaje Api Okkoma Samanai (1964). In his late years, Seneviratne played character roles in 1974 film Lasanda, 1976 film Wasana and in his final film Bambara Kalapaya (1991). After retiring from acting, Herbie worked as a manager at a cinema hall in Kurunegala. Later, he received the Lifetime Rana Thisara Award at the Sarasaviya Film Festival.

== Filmography ==
Year	Film	Roles	Ref.
1947	Asokamala	Sena 'Kumara'	
1948	Kapati Arakshakaya	Vipulasena	
1948	Veradunu Kurumanama	Chandrapala	
1950	Hadisi Vinischaya	Ananda	
1953	Eda Rae	Playback Singer, lyricist, Dialogue Writer, Actor: Banda	
1954	Iranganie	Jayaweera	
1957	Jeewitha Satana		
1957	Suraya	Doctor	
1957	Surasena	Surasena	
1958	Vana Mohini		
1960	Veera Vijaya	Vijaya	
1961	Daruwa Kageda?	Director, Banda	
1962	Sansaare		
1963	Sudu Sande Kalu Wala	Director, Police Inspector	
1964	Samaje Api Okkoma Samanai	Director, Nilame	
1974	Lasanda	Doctor	
1975	Sadhana		
1976	Wasana	Mr. Rajadasa	
1978	Sri Pathula		
1991	Bambara Kalapaya		
