= Latha Walpola =

Sri Lankan singer (1934–2025)

Latha Walpola ලතා වල්පොල
- Born: Matharage Rita Genevieve Fernando; 11 November 1934; Bambalapitiya, British Ceylon
- Died: 27 December 2025 (aged 91); Sri Jayawardenepura Kotte, Sri Lanka
- Resting place: Kanatte Cemetery
- Other name: Latha Fernando
- Education: St. Anthony's Convent
- Occupation: Singer
- Spouse: Dharmadasa Walpola (1958-1983)
- Children: 4, including Dhammika Perera; Amith Walpola
- Parents: Joseph Fernando (father); Elizabeth Muriel (mother)
- Relatives: Mahinda Bandara (son-in-law); Raju Bandara (cousin son)
- Musical career
- Genres: Pop; Soul; Rhythm & blues; Country music
- Instrument: Vocals
- Years active: 1946–2020
- Labels: Torana; Tharanga; HMV; Columbia
- Awards: Deshamanya, Kalasuri

Deshamanya Kalasuri Matharage Rita Genevieve Fernando (11 November 1934 – 27 December 2025), better known by her stage name Latha Walpola (Sinhala: ලතා වල්පොල), was a Sri Lankan singer. Affectionately known as "The Nightingale of Sri Lanka", Walpola had a stellar career as a playback singer spanned for eight decades and sang about 6750 songs for nearly 600 films.

== Early life ==
She was born as Rita Genevieve Fernando in Bambalapitiya on 11 November 1934, as the third child of the family with five siblings. Her father, Joseph Linus Fernando worked at Cargills store. Her mother, Elizabeth Muriel was a teacher at a convent, who encouraged Rita to become a singer. She lived in the house "Dhawalagiriya" in Bambalapitiya in first few years and later moved to Mount Lavinia after one of her father's brothers sold it for Rs. 35,000. She received her education at St. Anthony's Convent in Dehiwala-Mount Lavinia, where she led a church choir. She was a diehard fan of Rukmani Devi and Chitra Somapala, where Rita sang their popular songs at various school concerts in multiple times.

When Latha visited India for recording the playback singing for the film Ahankara Sthree, her father got very angry where he fought with Latha's mother and set fire to the things in the house. Therefore, Latha's brother, sister, and mother had to move to a relative's house.

== Career ==
At the age of 12, she joined the choir of Radio Ceylon in 1946 under the guidance of Wilman Silva, a neighbour. Accompany with Wilman, she went to meet C. A. Fonseka, who was a radio dramatist and musician. After seeing her singing abilities, Fonseka guided her to perform in his "Sarala Gee" program with his son C. D. Fonseka, who is also a singer. At the age of 14, she joined with C. D. Fonseka and his brother Erwin Fonseka to sang songs for a radio program once a month and also got the opportunity to join the group singing for the same program in 1947. During this period, she also met violinist Vincent de Alwis, who later introduced her to popular singers Susil Premaratne, C. T. Fernando, P. L. A. Somapala. In 1947, Walpola sang her first solo song, "Kandulu Denethe Vehena", which had lyrics by Sarath Wimalaweera and music composed by Vincent de Alwis, the resident violinist at Radio Ceylon. Then she sang songs for Susil Premaratne's Sarala Gee program and made popular duets with Premaratne "Ra Ruse Andana Lese" and "Ranwan Ran Karalin". In the same year, Latha made her first solo song recorded for radio "Namo Mariyani". The song is recorded as the song sang by Latha for the most times. It was recorded for Columbia Label and the album sold millions of copies.

She studied music under the musician Sunil Premaratne, who changed her name Rita Fernando to Latha Fernando after seeing her vocal similarity to Indian singer Lata Mangeshkar. She became extremely popular by singing duets like "Selalihini Kovul", "Malbara Himidiriye Pipune" and "Lo Ada Ninde" with C.T. Fernando. By 1950, she was well known in the country, covering the songs "Sukomala Banda Lelawa", "Dunhinda Helena", and "Diyaluma Helena", originally sung by Chitra Somapala. Walpola has recorded for both the Columbia and His Master's Voice record labels for many radio songs under the name Latha Fernando.

After many years in radio, Latha got the opportunity to meet K. Gunaratnam, the owner of Cinemas film production company. Gunaratnam invited Latha for playback singing in his 1953 film Sujatha, but later denied by her father. Even though her mother gave permission to sing songs, but her father was against it from the beginning. In the same year, she met Shanthi Kumar and made her maiden playback singing for Kumar's film Eda Rae without informing her father. In the film, she sang three duets "Hari Hari Ha Ha", "May Prithi Prithi Darling" and "Habata Mage" with Herbert M. Seneviratne, written by D. T. Fernando and music composed by Mohammed Gauss.

The film became a blockbuster and her singing excellence was identified by film producer S. M. Nayagam and musician R. Muttusamy, who trained her voice for film background music. Under their guidance, Latha made her breakthrough in the 1953 film Prema Tharangaya. In the film, Latha had six songs to sing and two were duets with actor Aruna Shanthi. However, Aruna had a difficulty singing the songs during the recording. At that time, musician M. Ariyadasa introduced Dharmadasa Walpola to record the duets with Latha. The duo made their first duet "Honda Honda Weya Lowa" which became highly popular among the public. After that success, she received several films in the following years such as: Ahankāra, Stree, Radaḷa Piḷiruva, Māthalan, Dingiri Mæṇikā, Duppathāgē Duka and Rēkhāva. With the arrival of Latha, Sri Lankan singers were opted by Sinhala movie producers, in preference to South Indian singers, for playback singing. Latha contributed to 35 films with his husband Dharmadasa Walpola for three decades. She had the opportunity to sing in 33 films between 1952 and 1960 and won the Sarasaviya Award, presented to individuals involved with the cinema of Sri Lanka, four times for the films: Getawarayo, Naarilatha, Okkoma Kanapita and Chitti. She won the first Sarasaviya Awards for the Best Female Singer in 1965 for the song "Heena Hathak Meda" for 1964 film Getawarayo.

She sang several songs composed by Indian musicians such as: Dakshina Murthy, T. F. Latif, T. R. Pappa as well as Sri Lankan musicians: B. S. Perera, W. D. Amaradeva, Sarath Dassanayake, Victor Rathnayake, Somapala Rathnayake, Sarath de Alwis, Sarath Wickrama and Premasiri Khemadasa. She dominated the Sinhala cinema as the only Sinhala songstress at that time and sung songs for sixty-three Sri Lankan actresses as early as Wansawathi Daulgala to recent Anarkali Akarsha from 1940s to 2000s. Latha made hundreds of duets with fellow musicians such as Susil Premaratne, C. T. Fernando, Dharmadasa Walpola, Mohideen Baig, Amaradeva, Sanath Nandasiri, Victor Ratnayake, H. R. Jothipala, Clarence Wijewardena, M. S. Fernando, Gratien Ananda and Rookantha Gunathilake.

Apart from that, Latha made background vocals for several popular Indian actresses such as Vyjayanthimala, Nimmi, Meena Kumari, Savitri, Chitra, Krishna Kumari, Nanda and Achala Sachdev. In 1957, she sang the song "Me Maaga Loke Obane" for Vyjayanthimala in the film 'Pathivatha', song "Māgē Nama Abdul Rahmān" for Nimmi in the film 'Ayyai Mallyi', songs "Disne Dīlā Enna Chandrā" and "Hada Thuḷa Mē Kavuda" for Nimmi in the film Angulimala. Then she made background vocals for Meena Kumari for the songs: "Brunda Vanaye", "Nil Menik Mage", "Lokaya Kartath Samanai", and "O Ratriyeye Mayame" for the film Ahimsaka Prayogaya.

In 2005, she won the Kalasuri award from the Sri Lankan government in 2005. In 2017, she was awarded the second highest civil award, Deshamanya, by the government. In 2016, she performed in the solo concert 'Ron Soya' on 2 April at 6:00 PM at the Bandaranaike Memorial International Conference Hall.

In 2021, she received a lifetime achievement award during a ceremony held for 21 artists who made contributions to Sinhala cinema in its early decades. In 2022, she received a lifetime achievement award at the Ceylon International Film Festival in Santa Barbara, California; the awards ceremony was held in Colombo, Sri Lanka in February 2023. She sang the song "Mahalu Viye Maa" penned by Premakeerthi de Alwis for the music of Stanley Peiris with her daughter Dhammika.

At the age of 86, she sang a song with music by Sarath de Alvis and lyrics by Jude Prasanna. Overall, she has sung more than 10,000 songs, including foreign language songs.

Apart from playback singing, she acted in three films: Eda Re (1953), Prema Tharangaya (1953) and Radala Piliruwa (1954). She also dubbed in the film Ahinsaka Prayogaya.

== In popular culture ==
The biographical film Latha, based on the life of Latha Walpola has directed by Mano Weerasekara, where Umali Thilakarathne made Walpola's role.

== Personal life ==
After a short relationship, Latha married Dharmadasa Walpola on 7 April 1958, becoming known as Latha Walpola since then. A ceremonial wedding was held at Sirikotha, Kollupitiya. The couple has three sons: Suneth (born on 1958), Amith (born on 1960), Chaminda (born on 1966) and one daughter: Dhammika (born on 1964). Dharmadasa Walpola was born on 27 November 1927 and was an accomplished musician adapt at playing the flute, harmonium, violin and tabla. He had a playback singing career for over three decades until his death on 25 December 1983 at the age of 56.

Her sons Amith and Suneth are popular singers in Sri Lanka and continued father's legacy. Dhammika is also a singer, who is married to musician and guitarist Mahinda Bandara. Mahinda's younger brother Raju Bandara was also a musician, who died in 2026.

He had some misunderstandings with fellow songstress Angeline Gunathilake, but later resolved and became close friends.

== Illness and death ==
Walpola was hospitalised in mid December 2025 with breathing difficulty and rumours circulated that she is dead, but later denied by her daughter.

Walpola died on 27 December 2025 at the age of 91 while receiving treatment at the Sri Jayawardenepura Hospital. Her remains were kept at the Jayaratne Respect Hall in Borella from 3pm to 10pm from 28 to 30 December 2025. The funeral took place on 31 December 2025 at the Kanatte Cemetery after full state honours at the Independence Memorial Hall.

== Awards ==
=== Sarasaviya Awards ===
Year	Nominee / work	Award	Result
1965	Getawarayo	Best Female Singer	Won
1970	Naarilatha	Best Female Singer	Won
1992	Contribution to cinema	"Ranathisara" Award	Won
1993	Okkoma Kanapita	Best Female Singer	Won
1996	Chitti	Best Female Singer	Won

=== Deepashika Awards ===
Year	Nominee / work	Award	Result
1974	Naarilatha	Female Singer with Most Number of Films	Won

=== Swarna Sanka Cinema Awards ===
Year	Nominee / work	Award	Result
1996	Chitti	Best Female Singer	Won

=== Presidential Awards ===
Year	Nominee / work	Award	Result
1997	Contribution to cinema	"Swarna Jayanthi" Award	Won

=== Other Awards ===
Year	Nominee / work	Award	Result
1992	Contribution to cinema	Golden Swan Award	Won
1995	Contribution to cinema	Golden Conch Award	Won
2005	Contribution to cinema	Kala Suri Award	Won
2007	Contribution to cinema	Deshamanya Award	Won
2021	Contribution to cinema	Lifetime Achievement Award	Won
2022	Contribution to cinema	Lifetime Achievement Award	Won

=== Sumathi Awards ===
Year	Nominee / work	Award	Result
2004	Contribution to cinema	U.W. Sumathipala Award	Won

=== OCIC Signis Awards ===
Year	Nominee / work	Award	Result
2006	Contribution to cinema	Appreciation Award	Won

=== Hiru Star Honorary Award ===
Year	Nominee / work	Award	Result
2024	Contribution to cinema	Lifetime Achievement Award	Won

=== CAC Excellency Award ===
Year	Nominee / work	Award	Result
2025	Contribution to cinema	Lifetime Achievement Award	Won

== Albums ==
- Divya Jesu
- Gee Rajina
- Lankaren Malak Pipee
- Latha Walpola with Flashback – Siyumali
- Latha Walpola with Sunflower
- Mangala Dinaye
- Pem Mal Mala
- Rajina Mamai
- Salalihini Kowul
- Sanda Komali
- Sukomala Banda Lelawa
- Srini Vibhushitha

== Playback singing ==
Year	Film	Notes	Ref.
1953	Eda Re	three songs	
1953	Prema Tharagaya	six songs	
1953	Puduma Leli	five songs	
1954	Ahankara Sthree	five songs	
1954	Radala Piliruwa	eight songs	
1955	Mathalan	eight songs	
1956	Dosthara	two songs	
1956	Dingiri Menika	seven songs	
1956	Duppathage Duka	four songs	
1956	Ramyalatha	six songs	
1956	Rekava	one song	
1957	Suraya	three songs	
1957	Siriyalatha	two songs	
1957	Sukumali	four songs	
1957	Saradama	five songs	
1957	Surasena	five songs	
1958	Sohoyuro	two songs	
1958	Deyyange Rate	one song	
1958	Salli Malli Salli	four songs	
1958	Suneetha	five songs	
1958	Sepali	three songs	
1958	Vanamohini	six songs	
1959	Purusha Rathnaya	one song	
1959	Sri 296	two songs	
1959	Sihinaya	two songs	
1959	Sirimali	five songs	
1959	Sandeshaya	four songs	
1960	Sundara Birinda	six songs	
1960	Pirimiyek Nisa	five songs	
1960	Veera Vijaya	five songs	
1961	Kurulu Bedda	two songs	
1961	Suvineetha Lalani	two songs	
1961	Daruwa Kageda	three songs	
1963	Adata Wadiya Heta Hondai	five songs	
1963	Suhada Sohoyuro	four songs	
1963	Udarata Menike	five songs	
1963	Sudu Sande Kalu Wala	four songs	
1963	Deepasika	three songs	
1964	Heta Pramada Wadi	five songs	
1964	Getawarayo	one song	
1964	Kala Kala De Pala Pala De	five songs	
1964	Dheewarayo	four songs	
1964	Suba Sarana Sepa Sithe	four songs	
1964	Samaje Api Okkoma Samanai	one song	
1964	Sasaraka Hati	four songs	
1964	Sujage Rahasa	seven songs	
1965	Sepatha Soya	one song	
1965	Sathutai Kandulai	three songs	
1965	Sudo Sudu	three songs	
1965	Yatagiya Dawasa	one song	
1965	Hathara Maha Nidhanaya	two songs	
1965	Allapu Gedara	one song	
1965	Landaka Mahima	four songs	
1966	Senasuma Kothanada	one song	
1966	Kolamaba Hadayo	two songs	
1966	Seethala Wathura	two songs	
1966	Athulvima Thahanam	two songs	
1966	Kapatikama	three songs	
1966	Senasili Suwaya	four songs	
1966	Layata Laya	two songs	
1967	Sagawuna Menika	one song	
1967	Amathaka Unada	one song	
1967	Sarana	one song	
1967	Wasanthi	one song	
1967	Ipadune Ai	two songs	
1967	Rena Giraw	two songs	
1967	Okkoma Hari	one song	
1968	Bicycle Hora	two songs	
1968	Wanasara	one song	
1968	Ruhunu Kumari	four songs	
1969	Kohomada Wede	two songs	
1969	Naarilatha	one song	
1969	Harimaga	three songs	
1969	Mee Messa	one song	
1969	Uthum Sthree	two songs	
1969	Pancha	one song	
1970	Sumudu Bharya	one song	
1970	Dan Mathakada	one song	
1970	Penawa Neda	one song	
1971	Kathuru Muwath	one song	
1971	Hathara Denama Soorayo	one song	
1971	Kesara Sinhayo	one song	
1970	Suli Sulan	two songs	
1971	Pujithayo	one song	
1971	Dewena Pipasaya	one song	
1971	Kalana Mithuro	one song	
1972	Edath Suraya Adath Suraya	two songs	
1972	Singappuru Charlie	one song	
1972	Ada Mehemai	two songs	
1972	Miringuwa	three songs	
1973	Aparadaya Saha Danduwama	one song	
1973	Hondai Narakai	one song	
1973	Dahakin Ekek	one song	
1974	Sheela	two songs	
1974	Kalyani Ganga	one song	
1974	Shanthi	three songs	
1974	Onna Babo Billo Enawa	two songs	
1974	Sagarika	three songs	
1974	Lasanda	two songs	
1974	Rodi Gama	two songs	
1975	Obai Mamai	one song	
1975	Raththaran Amma	one song	
1975	Awa Soya Adare	three songs	
1975	Sukiri Kella	one song	
1975	Hadawathaka Wasanthaya	one song	
1975	Sangeetha	one song	
1976	Nayana	four songs	
1976	Thilaka Ha Thilakaa	one song	
1976	Wasana	four songs	
1976	Haratha Hathara	one song	
1976	Asha	one song	
1976	Unnath Dahai Malath Dahai	two songs	
1976	Hulawali	two songs	
1976	Onna Mame Kella Panapi	one song	
1976	Deyyange Theenduwa	one song	
1976	Mangalaa	two songs	
1976	Nedeyo	one song	
1976	Ran Thilaka	three songs	
1976	Neela	one song	
1977	Sudu Paraviyo	one song	
1977	Hithuwakkarayo	one song	
1977	Sri Madara	three songs	
1977	Hariyanakota Ohoma Thamai	one song	
1977	Hithuwoth Hithuwamai	three songs	
1977	Honda Hitha	three songs	
1977	Yali Ipade	two songs	
1977	Sajaa	one song	
1977	Sikuru Dasawa	one song	
1977	Chandi Putha	one song	
1977	Maruwa Samaga Wase	one song	
1977	Niwena Ginna	one song	
1977	Yakadaya	one song	
1977	Sithaka Suwanda	two songs	
1978	Janaka Saha Manju	one song	
1978	Maduwanthi	one song	
1978	Sri Pathula	two songs	
1978	Asha Dasin	one song	
1978	Hitha Mithura	three songs	
1978	Saara	three songs	
1978	Kundalakeshi	two songs	
1978	Tikira	one song	
1978	Seetha Devi	two songs	
1978	Kumara Kumariyo	one song	
1978	Sasara	one song	
1978	Anupama	two songs	
1979	Samanmali	one song	
1979	Geheniyak	one song	
1979	Hingana Kolla	one song	
1979	Raja Kollo	two songs	
1979	Raan Kurullo	four songs	
1979	Wasanthaye Dawasak	three songs	
1979	Anusha	one song	
1979	Akke Mata Awasara	one song	
1979	Sugandhi	two songs	
1979	Sawudan Jema	one song	
1979	Nuwan Renu	two songs	
1979	Hari Pudumai	two songs	
1980	Seetha	two songs	
1980	Adara Rathne	one song	
1980	Bambara Pahasa	four songs	
1980	Raja Dawasak	three songs	
1981	Rangaa	two songs	
1981	Sathweni Dawasa	three songs	
1981	Senasuma	three songs	
1981	Suriyakantha	one song	
1981	Sathkulu Pawwa	three songs	
1981	Dayabara Nilu	three songs	
1981	Jeevanthi	one song	
1981	Samawenna	one song	
1982	Sakvithi Suwaya	one song	
1982	Pethigomara	one song	
1982	Sanasanna Ma	two songs	
1982	Anuradha	one song	
1982	Rahasak Nathi Rahasak	two songs	
1982	Jeewithayen Jeewithayak	one song	
1982	Pradeepa	one song	
1982	Wathura Karaththaya	two songs	
1982	Kiri Suwanda	one song	
1982	Sithara	one song	
1982	Situ Diyaniya	one song	
1982	Hello Shyama	one song	
1982	Thakkita Tharikita	one song	
1982	Mihidum Sihina	one song	
1982	Paramitha	one song	
1982	Rail Paara	one song	
1982	Kadawunu Poronduwa new	one song	
1983	Ranmini Muthu	one song	
1983	Sandamali	one song	
1983	Chutte	one song	
1983	Loku Thaththa	one song	
1983	Rathu Makara	one song	
1983	Hithath Hondai Wadath Hondai	one song	
1984	Mala Giraw	one song	
1984	Madduma Bandara	one song	
1984	Bambara Patikki	one song	
1984	Podi Ralahamy	one song	
1984	Rana Derana	one song	
1984	Hima Kathara	two songs	
1984	Hadawathaka Wedana	one song	
1984	Birinda	one song	
1985	Puthuni Mata Samawenna	one song	
1985	Mala Giraw	three songs	
1985	Rajina	one song	
1985	Rosy	one song	
1985	Sudu Mama	two songs	
1985	Du Daruwo	one song	
1985	Varsity Kella	four songs	
1985	Prarthana	one song	
1987	Yugayen Yugayata	three songs	
1987	Hitha Honda Chandiya	one song	
1987	Thaththi Man Adarei	one song	
1987	Yukthiyada Shakthiyada	one song	
1987	Kawuluwa	one song	
1987	Raja Wedakarayo	one song	
1987	Ran Damwel	four songs	
1987	Obatai Priye Adare	three songs	
1987	Ahinsa	one song	
1988	Chandingeth Chandiya	one song	
1988	Gedara Budun Amma	one song	
1988	Amme Oba Nisa	two songs	
1988	Angulimala	two songs	
1988	Newa Gilunath Bangchun	one song	
1988	Satana	one song	
1988	Newatha Api Ekwemu	two songs	
1989	Badulu Kochchiya	one song	
1989	Okkoma Rajawaru	one song	
1989	Shakthiya Obai Amme	one song	
1989	Waradata Danduwam	one song	
1990	Dese Mal Pipila	three songs	
1990	Thanha Asha	one song	
1990	Jayashakthi	two songs	
1990	Sambudu Mahima	one song	
1990	Hondin Naththam Narakin	one song	
1990	Walawwe Hamu	two songs	
1990	Madhu Sihina	one song	
1990	Honda Honda Sellam	two songs	
1990	Hitha Honda Puthek	two songs	
1990	Wana Bambara	three songs	
1991	Uthura Dakuna	two songs	
1991	Paradeese	one song	
1991	Sihina Ahase Wasanthe	two songs	
1991	Obata Pamanai Adare	two songs	
1991	Asai Bayai	one song	
1991	Raja Kollo	two songs	
1991	Love In Bangkok	one song	
1991	Salambak Hadai	three songs	
1991	Cheriyo Doctor	one song	
1991	Dhanaya	one song	
1991	Alibaba Saha Horu 40	two songs	
1992	Suwadena Suwandak	three songs	
1992	Sakvithi Raja	one song	
1992	Malsara Doni	one song	
1992	Ahimi Dadaman	one song	
1992	Sakkara Suththara	one song	
1992	Umayangana	one song	
1992	Rumathiyai Neethiyai	two songs	
1992	Kulageya	one song	
1992	Oba Mata Wiswasai	two songs	
1992	Suranimala	two songs	
1992	Sathya	one song	
1992	Sinhayangeth Sinhaya	one song	
1993	Rajek Wage Puthek	two songs	
1993	Prathigna	two songs	
1993	Sargent Nallathambi	two songs	
1993	Weli Sulanga	two songs	
1993	Come O Go Chicago	one song	
1993	Chaya Maya	five songs	
1993	Yasasa	one song	
1993	Sandareka	two songs	
1993	Lagin Giyoth Aehek Na	one song	
1993	Madara Parasathu	three songs	
1994	Nohadan Kumariye	one song	
1994	Dhawala Pushpaya	one song	
1994	Abhiyogaya	two songs	
1994	Sujatha New	one song	
1994	Sandamadala	two songs	
1994	Mawbime Weerayo	one song	
1994	Okkoma Hondatai	one song	
1994	Hellow My Darling	two songs	
1995	Inspector Geetha	one song	
1995	Rodaya	one song	
1995	Ira Handa Illa	two songs	
1995	Pudumai Eth Aththai	one song	
1995	Deviyani Sathya Surakinna	one song	
1995	Chitti	one song	
1995	Age Wairaya	one song	
1995	Edath Chandiya Adath Chandiya	three songs	
1995	Cheriyo Captain	two songs	
1995	Chandani	four songs	
1995	Sudu Walassu	one song	
1995	Dalulana Gini	five songs	
1996	Hitha Hondanam Waradin Na	three songs	
1996	Sebe Mithura Deviyeki	two songs	
1996	Hitha Honda Geheniyak	two songs	
1996	Sihina Vimane Raja Kumari	four songs	
1996	Mal Hathai	one song	
1996	Cheriyo Darling	two songs	
1996	Bawa Sasara	one song	
1997	Puthuni Mata Wasana	three songs	
1997	Surayo Wedakarayo	one song	
1997	Punaruppaththiya	one song	
1997	Ramba Saha Madhu	one song	
1997	Pem Mal Mala	two songs	
1997	Raththaran Minihek	three songs	
1997	Good Bye Tokyo	one song	
1998	Yudha Gini Meda	one song	
1998	Aeya Obata Barai	two songs	
1998	Re Daniel Dawal Migel	one song	
1998	Akkai Nangiyi	one song	
1998	Girlfriend	one song	
1998	Aege Wairaya 3	one song	
1999	Kolompoor	two songs	
1999	Seetha Samire	two songs	
2000	Danduwama	two songs	
2000	Anuragaye Ananthaya	two songs	
2001	Oba Koheda Priye	four songs	
2001	Oba Magema Wewa	two songs	
2001	Dinuma Kageda	one song	
2001	Wasanthaye Kunatuwak	two songs	
2003	Sundarai Adare	one song	
2003	Jim Pappa	one song	
2004	Clean Out	two songs	
2004	Re Daniel Dawal Migel 3	one song	
2005	Sanduni	one song	
2005	James Bond	one song	
2006	Naga Kanya	one song	
2006	Supiri Balawatha	two songs	
2006	Sonduru Wasanthe	three songs	
2007	Mr Dana Rina	two songs	
2007	First Love Pooja	one song	
2007	Jundai Gundai	one song	
2008	Super Star	two songs	
2008	Hathara Denama Soorayo New	one song	
2008	Ai Oba Thaniwela	four songs	
2010	Viyapath Bambara	one song	
2011	Muthu Salamba	three songs	
2016	Aathma Warusha	two songs	
2008	Lantin Singho	one song	
2017	Appata Siri	one song	
2017	Sellam Nethnam Lellam	one song	

incomplete

== Playback film tracks ==
Year	Film	Song	Duet with
1953	Eda Re	Hari Hari Ha Ha	
1953	Eda Re	Habaata Maage	
1953	Eda Re	My Prithi Prithi Darling	
1953	Prema Tharagaya	Sama Malin Ron Soya	
1953	Prema Tharagaya	Ho Hada Di	
1953	Prema Tharagaya	Darunu Gii Dalewi	
1953	Prema Tharagaya	Ugathu Wiyathu	
1953	Prema Tharagaya	Sapatha Siwarage	
1953	Prema Tharagaya	Honda Hondama Weya Lowa	Dharmadasa Walpola
1953	Puduma Leli	Palu Una Harda Rajje	
1953	Puduma Leli	Diya Gedara Aththeya	
1953	Puduma Leli	Sudu Suhada Mage	
1953	Puduma Leli	O Mahada Bimbu Kala	
1953	Puduma Leli	Api Pivithuru Vu	
1954	Ahankara Sthree	Hada Galawaala	
1954	Ahankara Sthree	Premaye Chandraya	
1954	Ahankara Sthree	Lankaren Malak Pipi	
1954	Ahankara Sthree	Jeewithe wikaareki	
1954	Ahankara Sthree	Manahaara Me Hela Bhumi	
1954	Radala Piliruwa	Pem Loke Nayana Rasi Pem	
1954	Radala Piliruwa	Mihira Penwa Di Aale Pa	
1954	Radala Piliruwa	Dine Dine andure Yai	
1954	Radala Piliruwa	Aale Kaavi Kaale	
1954	Radala Piliruwa	Sun Sun Sun Daling	
1954	Radala Piliruwa	Dilisevi Rupe Premawantha	
1954	Radala Piliruwa	Gee Kiyanna Gee Kiyanna	
1954	Radala Piliruwa	Nambuwa Soya Soya	
1955	Mathalan	Iwasana Hade	
1955	Mathalan	Dinida Udaya	
1955	Mathalan	Sanda Kolami	
1955	Mathalan	Doi Doi Doi	
1955	Mathalan	Pemmaala Gotha	
1955	Mathalan	Sulalitha Vu Kalaa	
1955	Mathalan	Dine Dine Savsrini	
1955	Mathalan	Mawalaa Ane	
1956	Dosthara	Dilindu Bawa Leba	
1956	Dosthara	Sri Lanka Deepe	
1956	Dingiri Menika	Maage Dose Nisa	
1956	Dingiri Menika	Peradiga Muthu Atayai Me	
1956	Dingiri Menika	Sabawe Sihina Maage	
1956	Dingiri Menika	Pem Raajyaye	
1956	Dingiri Menika	Goviya We Rataka Bale	
1956	Dingiri Menika	Maawa Hanga Wane	
1956	Dingiri Menika	Kavi	
1956	Duppathage Duka	Sethani Aiyage Hotale	
1956	Duppathage Duka	Pura Handa Lesatama Babalanawa	
1956	Duppathage Duka	Ingi Bingi Paalaa Kulmath Weela	
1956	Duppathage Duka	Aai Aai Lowa Peralenawa	
1956	Ramyalatha	Prithiya Hurde Pura	
1956	Ramyalatha	Sansare Me Preme	
1956	Ramyalatha	Pem Yathrawa Thanaa	
1956	Ramyalatha	Adare Sapedo	
1956	Ramyalatha	O Premasiri	
1956	Ramyalatha	Sangeethaye Sirigara Rasaye	
1956	Rekava	Sigiri Landakage	
1957	Suraya	Sudu Suda Re Una	
1957	Suraya	Pivithuru Manahara	
1957	Suraya	Atha Denna Denna	
1957	Siriyalatha	Honda Kaale Yali Awe	
1957	Siriyalatha	Hari Giya Paramaarthe	
1957	Sukumali	Seethalai Seethalai	
1957	Sukumali	Hurde Ande	
1957	Sukumali	Kenek Kohendo	
1957	Sukumali	Aloke Devi Hurde	
1957	Saradama	Nodanimi Koheda Yanne	
1957	Saradama	Podi Kaale Hinda	
1957	Saradama	Nataa Geetha Gayaa	
1957	Saradama	Pem Hada Wimane	
1957	Saradama	Ahase Sanda Se	
1957	Surasena	Ananda Sriya Wahei	
1957	Surasena	Paavi Paavi Akase	
1957	Surasena	Aloke Aloke	
1957	Surasena	Wasanthe Wane	
1957	Surasena	Sanda Kanthi Wadi	
1958	Sohoyuro	Komala Prema Suda	
1958	Sohoyuro	Wasuna Dora Adare	
1958	Deyyange Rate	Seetha Gangule Seetha Hime	
1958	Salli Malli Salli	Siriyawa Mathuwe Vinode	
1958	Salli Malli Salli	Akase Ihala Pawenawa	
1958	Salli Malli Salli	Samagiwa Adimuko Dela Mude	
1958	Salli Malli Salli	Sadu Priye Bhagawa	
1958	Suneetha	Prithi Bo We Maa Hade	
1958	Suneetha	Paayaa Sangi Sangi	
1958	Suneetha	Pem Lokayak Mawaalaa	
1958	Suneetha	Karumeda Mage	
1958	Suneetha	Paavi Yaavi Yaavi	
1958	Sepali	Dedenaage Aale	
1958	Sepali	Dan Kaale Waage Loke	
1958	Sepali	Ai Ane Wedanaa	
1958	Vanamohini	Sihineki Baala Kaale	
1958	Vanamohini	Pipena Piyuman	
1958	Vanamohini	Enawai Keewe Na Thawa Aawe	
1958	Vanamohini	Din Din Din Din Gassena Sadde	
1958	Vanamohini	Dethata Detha Thiyala	
1958	Vanamohini	Sav Sath Prabodha Dee	
1959	Purusha Rathnaya	Jeewithe Gangawaki	
1959	Sri 296	Me Enna Sanasannam	
1959	Sri 296	Jeevana Ganga Ivure Api	
1959	Sihinaya	Ha Hada Dedara	
1959	Sihinaya	Mage Jeewe	
1959	Sirimali	Karunawa Yukthi Dharme	
1959	Sirimali	Akase Awase	
1959	Sirimali	Ran karalini Saara Wela	
1959	Sirimali	Pem Hada Morayi	
1959	Sirimali	Sinasewi Chandra	
1959	Sadeshaya	Rena Gira Rena	
1959	Sadeshaya	Punsanda Eliyai	
1959	Sadeshaya	Rajina Mamai	
1959	Sadeshaya	Sudata Sude	
1960	Sundara Birinda	Siriya Sobana Nayana	
1960	Sundara Birinda	Sitha Mage Paruna	
1960	Sundara Birinda	Nini De Nini De	
1960	Sundara Birinda	Adare Mage Ma Dama	
1960	Sundara Birinda	Hada Sinamawe Nalangana	
1960	Sundara Birinda	Rangapa Vinode	
1960	Pirimiyek Nisa	Sidu vu De Aho Aparade	
1960	Pirimiyek Nisa	Angata Kadan Mokada Wade	
1960	Pirimiyek Nisa	Bahi Ganda Raani Man Aaran	
1960	Pirimiyek Nisa	Suwandethi Pem Kusuma	
1960	Pirimiyek Nisa	Dutuda Wagema Lassanai	
1960	Veera Vijaya	Iranamata Savoma Gathi Wewi	
1960	Veera Vijaya	Asiridayaka Maani	
1960	Veera Vijaya	Pem Thisarano	
1960	Veera Vijaya	Sisila Hamanne	
1960	Veera Vijaya	So Gini Bura Bura	
1961	Kurulu Bedda	Oya Belma Oya Kelma	
1961	Kurulu Bedda	Kurulu Kobei Parevi Wage	
1961	Suvineetha Lalali	Doy Doiya Puthe	
1961	Suvineetha Lalali	Thani Wee Mey Loke	
1961	Daruwa Kageda	Chandra Paaya	
1961	Daruwa Kageda	Ennako Gannako	
1961	Daruwa Kageda	Nilwala Yaawi Pawela	
1963	Adata Wadiya Heta Hondai	Sethsiri Sethsiri Mangala We	
1963	Adata Wadiya Heta Hondai	Soka Susum Maruthe	
1963	Adata Wadiya Heta Hondai	Baloli Loli Doiya Baba	
1963	Adata Wadiya Heta Hondai	Rasadun Netha Di Sadase	
1963	Adata Wadiya Heta Hondai	Aaw Aaw	
1963	Suhada Sohoyuro	Geethayak Nisa Age	
1963	Suhada Sohoyuro	So Gini Hade Naga E	
1963	Suhada Sohoyuro	Samagi Damin Bandila	
1963	Suhada Sohoyuro	Oyai Mamai Vinode	
1963	Udarata Menike	Ranga Ramma Ran ranga Ramma	
1963	Udarata Menike	Sanda Sonduriyage Gele	
1963	Udarata Menike	Sura Nara Pujitha	
1963	Udarata Menike	Hade bandi Daa Preme	
1963	Udarata Menike	Sepathehi Wewa	
1963	Sudu Sande Kalu Wala	Sudu Sande Enna Ane	
1963	Sudu Sande Kalu Wala	Mal Gaswel Ganga Lowe	
1963	Sudu Sande Kalu Wala	Somnasa Ithire Ma Hurde	
1963	Sudu Sande Kalu Wala	Ko Ane Dugiya	
1963	Deepasika	Kan Kan Buru	
1963	Deepasika	Me Jeewitha Kaanthaare	
1963	Deepasika	Ennaa Karume	
1964	Heta Pramada Wadi	Pem Piduwai Ama Wilai	
1964	Heta Pramada Wadi	Bathi Pem Daya	
1964	Heta Pramada Wadi	Pem Bandi Anganak	
1964	Heta Pramada Wadi	Prithi Sitha Prithi	
1964	Heta Pramada Wadi	Sondure Mihire	
1964	Getawarayo	Heena Hathak Mada	
1964	Kala Kala De Pala Pala De	Anandai Premaneeya	
1964	Kala Kala De Pala Pala De	Sasare Dukai Loke	
1964	Kala Kala De Pala Pala De	Padam Kala Ithin Iwarai	
1964	Kala Kala De Pala Pala De	Adarayen Hadawatha Bandila	
1964	Kala Kala De Pala Pala De	Nade Sumadura Wewa	
1964	Dheewarayo	Sathuta Soke jaya Paraade	
1964	Dheewarayo	Nilata Nile Wihidee Yai	
1964	Dheewarayo	Awilla Awilla	
1964	Dheewarayo	Wella Simbina Rella	
1964	Suba Sarana Sepa Sithe	Dilindeku Uwada	
1964	Suba Sarana Sepa Sithe	Tharuna Landak	
1964	Suba Sarana Sepa Sithe	Suba Sarane Bandala	
1964	Suba Sarana Sepa Sithe	Santhape Soke	
1964	Samaje Api Okkoma Samanai	Paayana Oba Sudu Sandak Wage	
1964	Sasaraka Hati	Oba Mage Loke	
1964	Sasaraka Hati	Nelum Manel	
1964	Sasaraka Hati	Ma Mawwa Pemketha	
1964	Sasaraka Hati	Hima Wana Sandun Wane	
1964	Sujage Rahasa	Hada Ambare Payala	
1964	Sujage Rahasa	Sithata Sithana Lesa	
1964	Sujage Rahasa	Arambuma Kothanada	
1964	Sujage Rahasa	Nayana Wile Seetha Jale	
1964	Sujage Rahasa	Ambare Balanna Punsande	
1964	Sujage Rahasa	Kawadado Sobana Seena Lowe	
1964	Sujage Rahasa	Jeevanaye Adaraye	
1965	Sepatha Soya	Suwabara Yane ninda Puthage	
1965	Sathutai Kandulai	Preme Minisa Lo Bihi Kale	
1965	Sathutai Kandulai	Jathika Alaya De Anuragaya	
1965	Sathutai Kandulai	Amaniya Adare Ran Rasa Se	
1965	Sudo Sudu	Iranama Duk Susum Mawa	
1965	Sudo Sudu	Lokaya Ma Hata Urana Wela	
1965	Sudo Sudu	Sihina Sebewe	
1965	Yatagiya Dawasa	Ganga Yanne Koheda Gala	
1965	Hathara Maha Nidhanaya	Lanka Pure	
1965	Hathara Maha Nidhanaya	Matha Matha Matha	
1965	Allapu Gedara	Linda Thula Medi Una Mediya	
1965	Landaka Mahima	Esata Esak Hamu Wu Da	
1965	Landaka Mahima	Alokaya Deka Yanna	
1965	Landaka Mahima	Walakulak Aedi Awith	
1965	Landaka Mahima	Mangalle Niyama Wuna	
1966	Senasuma Kothanada	Adaraye Ran Wimane	
1966	Kolamaba Hadayo	Aloke Dila Ape	
1966	Kolamaba Hadayo	Suhada Leelawa Sobhawa	
1966	Seethala Wathura	Mangala Dinaye	
1966	Seethala Wathura	Tharu Muthuhara Palanda	
1966	Athulvima Thahanam	Sinase Sinase	
1966	Athulvima Thahanam	Ginnen Hada Awilei	
1966	Kapatikama	Dehadaka Adara Suwa	
1966	Kapatikama	Kurulu Ren Ren	
1966	Kapatikama	Mama Obage Pem Wadane	
1966	Senasili Suwaya	Ma Mawwa Pem Maliga	
1966	Senasili Suwaya	Somnasa Sulange Pwenawa	
1966	Senasili Suwaya	Nithi Ma Dalwana Pahane	
1966	Senasili Suwaya	Sithu Pathu De Nasi	
1966	Layata Laya	Unge Muwek Wage	
1966	Layata Laya	Wane Pethe Nisansale	
1967	Sagawuna Menika	Pipila Hada Wile	
1967	Amathaka Unada	Dese uwana Obai	
1967	Sarana	Chandra anduru ahase Nagi	
1967	Wasanthi	Paawena Relle	
1967	Ipadune Ai	Pem Nelawille	
1967	Ipadune Ai	Suwanda Malata	
1967	Rena Giraw	Ron Rasa Berena Mal Kemiye	
1967	Rena Giraw	Kanda Udin Ena	
1967	Okkoma Hari	Pipena Malaka Mee Maduwitha	
1968	Bicycle Hora	Budures Gala Basi	
1968	Bicycle Hora	Mal Kekulu Kuludul	
1968	Wanasara	Kalpana Igillila	
1968	Ruhunu Kumari	Pipunu Pinketha	
1968	Ruhunu Kumari	Sihina Lowe Kawada Ho	
1968	Ruhunu Kumari	Popiyana Sathutak	
1968	Ruhunu Kumari	Debema Dedunu Dele	
1969	Kohomada Wede	Hen Miris Karale	
1969	Kohomada Wede	Ashawe Sihil Sandelle	
1969	Naarilatha	Awaragireth Natha	
1969	Harimaga	Jaya Bimai Nija Bimai	
1969	Harimaga	Aththatu Salamin Sithuvili	
1969	Harimaga	Desa Penenam	
1969	Mee Messa	Sammaanaye Sidu Vu	
1969	Uthum Sthree	Yuropaye Hima Watena	
1969	Uthum Sthree	Pehekam Govikam	
1969	Pancha	Nidana Lokaye Mihirida	
1970	Sumudu Bharya	Prema Paraviyan Thideneku Ekvi	
1970	Dan Mathakada	Kohedo Kohedo	
1970	Penawa Neda	Mini Mini Mini Gavuma	
1970	Suli Sulan	Seethala Pawane	
1970	Suli Sulan	Jeewithayada Me	
1971	Poojithayo	Palu Andure Pathum Sohone	
1971	Dewena Pipasaya	Ruchiranana Madhu Suwanda Gala	
1971	Kalana Mithuro	Yugma Tharaka Dilisena	
1971	Kathuru Muwath	Sihina Lowaka Pathu Semera	
1971	Hathara Denama Surayo	Pathum Mallaki Me Jeewithe	
1971	Kesara Sinhayo	Kithsiri Randu	
1972	Edath Suraya Adath Suraya	Me Suba Upandine	
1972	Edath Suraya Adath Suraya	Maaa Paavi Yai	
1972	Singappuru Charlie	Ada Arumathi Wisithuru	
1972	Ada Mehemai	Jeevitha Gamane Badaka	
1972	Ada Mehemai	Makaranda Rasagonna	
1972	Miringuwa	Sangeela Wana Mal Maala	
1972	Miringuwa	Desadun suwanda Maki Yayi	
1972	Miringuwa	Gaha Kola Lapalu Palawela	
1973	Aparadaya Saha Danduwama	Ran Veenawaka Sathsara	
1973	Hondai Narakai	Mee Vithai Rasa Geethayai	
1973	Dahakin Ekek	Jeevithe Gaman Thale	
1974	Sheela	Malsara Dothe	
1974	Sheela	Duk Wedana Vidimi	
1974	Kalyani Ganga	Asiri Wewa Pathami	
1974	Shanthi	Aloke Labu Kisiwek	
1974	Shanthi	Aido Me Mayawo	
1974	Shanthi	Me Ayachana Asanu Menawi	
1974	Onna Babo Billo Enawa	Dilindu Pelai Situ Medurai	
1974	Onna Babo Billo Enawa	Oba Nopenila Me Dese	
1974	Sagarika	Madu Sanda Kasun	
1974	Sagarika	Sisil Ama Jala Dahara	Sanath Nandasiri
1974	Sagarika	Ginidel Sunil Diyawel	M.S. Fernado, Three Sisters
1974	Lasanda	Kan Kan Buru Chin Chin	
1974	Lasanda	Dehenin Binduna	W. D. Amaradeva
1974	Rodi Gama	Sathuta Mihira Wehe	
1974	Rodi Gama	Loka Natha Budu Himi	
1975	Obai Mamai	Alankara Preethi Loke	
1975	Raththaran Amma	Heta Uda Nowana	
1975	Awa Soya Adare	Ma Seda Sulangaka	
1975	Awa Soya Adare	Soya Soya Yami	
1975	Awa Soya Adare	Ron Soya	
1975	Sukiri Kella	Seethale Mal Wane	
1975	Hadawathaka Wasanthaya	Preethiya Mage	
1975	Sangeetha	Hasangana Adhipathi	
1976	Nayana	Sihinen Ki Namak	W. Premaratne
1976	Nayana	Kiriketi Chuti Kete	
1976	Nayana	Me Jeewithayama Mal	W. Premaratne
1976	Nayana	Ran Pata Ranwan Wala	Dharmadasa Walpola
1976	Thilaka Ha Thilakaa	Nilwan Nil Kadurella	W. D. Amaradeva
1976	Wasana	Pokuru Pokuru	
1976	Haratha Hathara	Ashawe Mal Panduru	Victor Rathnayake
1976	Asha	Relin Relata Ena	Sisira Senaratne, Milton Mallawarachchi, Indrani Wijebandara
1976	Unnath Dahai Malath Dahai	Nilmini Sangi Pawee	
1976	Unnath Dahai Malath Dahai	Dese Asha Wehe	K. Sena
1976	Hulawali	Dahaya Thapaya Niwa	
1976	Hulawali	Jayasiri Setha Sadana	
1976	Onna Mame Kella Panapi	Ran Ran Ranwan Rupe	H. R. Jothipala, Angeline Gunathilake, Dharmadasa Walpola
1976	Deyyange Theenduwa	Honda Nama Ruwan Wage	
1976	Mangalaa	Suhada Arayum Obatane	
1976	Mangalaa	Punchi Puthune Me Ahanna	
1976	Nedeyo	A Rankada Pemkada	M. S. Fernando
1976	Ran Thilaka	Pera Penena Me Sansare	
1976	Ran Thilaka	Raththaran Dimuthu Menik	
1976	Ran Thilaka	Jale Galana Sisila Gene	
1976	Neela	Aradhana Sansaraye	
1977	Sudu Paraviyo	Jeevithe Mansale	
1977	Sri Madara	Gaha Kola Mal	Victor Rathnayake
1977	Sri Madara	Villuwa Palase Mini Oville	
1977	Sri Madara	Monaro Monaro	
1977	Hariyanakota Ohoma Thamai	Mahade Sunila Nil Diye	Dharmadasa Walpola
1977	Hithuwoth Hithuwamai	Chukki Chukki	Victor Rathnayake
1977	Hithuwoth Hithuwamai	Ma Hadana Senehi	
1977	Hithuwoth Hithuwamai	Adara Kithiyen	
1977	Honda Hitha	Ayubowan Seradewa	Angeline Gunathilake
1977	Honda Hitha	Ghana Andakare Paawe	
1977	Honda Hitha	Sepathehi Wewa	
1977	Yali Ipade	Me Jeewana Kandulu	
1977	Yali Ipade	Hankithi Hankithi Kawala	Dharmadasa Walpola
1977	Sajaa	Hathi Hathi Hathi Helaa	
1977	Sikuru Dasawa	Sasalawa Therape	
1977	Chandi Putha	Ammala Dukganne	
1977	Maruwa Samaga Wase	Shrungare Adare	
1977	Niwena Ginna	Happy Birthday to You	
1977	Yakadaya	Malin Malata Bambaru	
1977	Sithaka Suwanda	Adare Hinda Man Vinda	
1977	Sithaka Suwanda	Me Kandulu Galaa	
1978	Janaka Saha Manju	Loke Jeewath Wannata	Clarence Wijewardena
1978	Maduwanthi	Ma Ki De Hadin Ki De	
1978	Sri Pathula	Pawee Pawee Ukdadu Geethe	
1978	Sri Pathula	Madhura Rasai Man Lowe	
1978	Asha Dasin	Asha Bede Hade Maa	
1978	Hitha Mithura	Obai Mage Kathandare	Victor Rathnayake
1978	Hitha Mithura	Kanduleli Dese Helaalaa	
1978	Hitha Mithura	Hela Helei	J. A. Milton Perera
1978	Saara	Malak Upannai Ron Rasa	
1978	Saara	Tikiri Muhune Siriya Hanga	
1978	Saara	Sudu Rosa Malin Hada	Dharmadasa Walpola
1978	Kundalakeshi	Kolama Priya Ambika	Harun Lanthra
1978	Kundalakeshi	Pathum Asha Vinasha Una	
1978	Tikira	Pedi Suwa Saame	
1978	Seetha Devi		Sang a song, but not included
1978	Kumara Kumariyo	Adare Mal Mawathe	
1978	Sasara	Hurathal Hada Pem Haguman	
1978	Anupama	Jeewana Nagare Natabun	
1978	Anupama	Sihina Vile Nilupuli	H.R. Jothipala
1979	Samanmali	Asha Mal Mawan Kalabala	Dharmadasa Walpola
1979	Geheniyak	Puthe Rankade	
1979	Hingana Kolla	Iru Deviyo Ipanalle	
1979	Raja Kollo	Obe Sihina Hansa Sena	Dharmadasa Walpola
1979	Raja Kollo	Suralowinda Awe	Dharmadasa Walpola
1979	Raan Kurullo	Sundarathawe Gammane	
1979	Raan Kurullo	Raan Kurullo Raan Kirilli Ko	
1979	Raan Kurullo	Saragi Kathawe Nuragi Lathawe	
1979	Raan Kurullo	Duka Shoka Sanka	
1979	Wasanthaye Dawasak	Malagira	T. M. Jayaratne
1979	Wasanthaye Dawasak	Dedunnen Ena Samanalune	Sanath Nandasiri
1979	Wasanthaye Dawasak	Sanda Pem Pahanin	T. M. Jayaratne
1979	Anusha	Asha Piruna Desin	
1979	Akke Mata Awasara	Wisama Asanna Lo Thale	
1979	Sugandhi	Wedanawa Ai Me Loke	
1979	Sugandhi	Jeewanaye Sandun Ruke	
1979	Sawudan Jema	Sele Sele Malu Pataw	Dhammika Walpola
1979	Nuwan Renu	Me Seetha Nille	Victor Rathnayake
1979	Nuwan Renu	Rena Gira Renin Wenwa Giya	
1979	Hari Pudumai	Mahababa Ketuwa Heti	
1979	Hari Pudumai	Kunda Kunda Thaka Don	M. S. Fernando
1980	Seetha	Sri Lanka Jana Rajini	
1980	Seetha	Koido Oba Koido	
1980	Adara Rathne	Mal Mal Pathum Mewena	
1980	Bambara Pahasa	Hada Akase Dilena	H. R. Jothipala
1980	Bambara Pahasa	Ruwan Pahan Wage	
1980	Bambara Pahasa	Hiru Sadu Hamuwanne	
1980	Bambara Pahasa	Obe Hasarel Dele	H.R. Jothipala
1980	Raja Dawasak	Krishna Dharawo	H. R. Jothipala
1980	Raja Dawasak	Apa Maha Rajida	
1980	Raja Dawasak	Gala Giyawe Mudu Kadulu	
1981	Rangaa	Mage Adara Lowa Bidawetuna	
1981	Sathweni Dawasa	Mandaram Wahi Sithe	
1981	Sathweni Dawasa	Jaya Pegenawa	
1981	Sathweni Dawasa	Chora Chorana Bangaruwa	
1981	Senasuma	Ude Mal Pipewi	
1981	Senasuma	Punchi Nila Dese	H.R. Jothipala, Dhammika Walpola
1981	Senasuma	Soka Susuman Mora	
1981	Suriyakantha	Nelum Nupan Vile	Victor Rathnayake
1981	Sathkulu Pawwa	Me Seetha Rathriye	T. M. Jayaratne
1981	Sathkulu Pawwa	Seethala Sulagata Thuruluwa	
1981	Sathkulu Pawwa	Sala Latha Hama Giya	
1981	Dayabara Nilu	Jeewana Wasanthe Mal Gomuwe	
1981	Dayabara Nilu	Asha Nethu Sayure	Mervin Perera
1981	Dayabara Nilu	Susum Legum Gath	
1981	Jeevanthi	Mage Sudu Duwe Jeevanthi	
1981	Samawenna	Pem Kalpanawo	T. M. Jayaratne
1982	Sakvithi Suwaya	Premawanthayinge	T. M. Jayaratne
1982	Pethigomara	Dahadiya Wagurala	H.R. Jothipala, Lakshman Rodrigo, Roy de Silva
1982	Sanasanna Ma	Hitha Mage Parinatha Vi	
1982	Sanasanna Ma	Ma Dan Obe Do	H. R. Jothipala, Angeline Gunathilake
1982	Anuradha	Maya Atheethaye	
1982	Yawwanaye Mal Kekulu	Hitha Mage Parinatha Vi	H. R. Jothipala, Vernon Perera, Florida Perera
1982	Yawwanaye Mal Kekulu	Api Hinehenna	
1982	Jeewithayen Jeewithayak	Dura Atha Kandu Rene	
1982	Pradeepa	Jeewa Nawum Pahase	Victor Rathnayake
1982	Wathura Karaththaya	Suba Gamage Suba Mohothe	
1982	Wathura Karaththaya	Suba Gamane Thaniya Makaa	
1982	Kiri Suwanda	Surangana Geetha Reye	Victor Rathnayake
1982	Sithara	Adara Paradeese	T. M. Jayaratne
1982	Situ Diyaniya	Situ Diyaniya Ma	
1982	Hello Shyama	Sonduru Gunethi Mawage	
1982	Thakkita Tharikita	Kinduru Kumariya Sewane	
1982	Mihidum Sihina	Mal Thalawe Re Walawe	
1982	Paramitha	Wadina Hiruta	
1982	Rail Paara	Ran Samanala Thatumatha	H. R. Jothipala
1982	Kadawunu Poronduwa new	Prema Daya Mage Piyano	
1983	Ranmini Muthu	Pagiri Wayase Komala Landun	H. R. Jothipala
1983	Sandamali	Pem Charika Yamu	W. D. Amaradeva
1983	Chutte	Samanola Sihina Yuga	Mervin Perera
1983	Loku Thaththa	Nayane Senasi Thurule	
1983	Rathu Makara	Kuravi Kewillani Ape	
1983	Hithath Hondai Wadath Hondai	Me Rathriye Duwe Nidanne	
1984	Madduma Bandara	A Udara Wagekimen	
1984	Bambara Patikki	Run Run Bambara Male	
1984	Podi Ralahamy	Sudu Rosa Pipe	T. M. Jayaratne
1984	Rana Derana	Ganga Iwuren Eha	
1984	Hima Kathara	Seethala Hiripoda	
1984	Hima Kathara		song with Amaradeva not included
1984	Birinda	Salithawela Pooja Wewa	
1985	Puthuni Mata Samawenna	Rosa Male Natuwe Katu	
1985	Mala Giraw	Me Soduru Seetha Kumari	Mervin Perera
1985	Mala Giraw	Uda Una Rana Thisara	Victor Rathnayake
1985	Mala Giraw	Dasa Mase Urekathwa	
1985	Rajina	Wasanthaya Obada Maage	Morris Wijesinghe
1985	Rosy	Nuwan Ime Atha Vilthere	
1985	Sudu Mama	Mulu Jeevithem Wasila	
1985	Sudu Mama	Adaraye Ran Mal Sena	Milton Mallawarachchi
1985	Du Daruwo	Arunaloke Kuludul Rekha	H. R. Jothipala
1985	Varsity Kella	Mal Pipila Lalitha	
1985	Varsity Kella	Ran Tharaka Hada Abare	
1985	Varsity Kella	Maa Lalana Komalavi	Mervin Perera, Greshan Ananda, Rohana Weerasinghe
1985	Varsity Kella	Dedunne Pata Pata	
1985	Prarthana	Kanthiye Maya Ranin	H. R. Jothipala
1987	Yugayen Yugayata	Wanamal Suwanda Ura	
1987	Yugayen Yugayata	Eka Belmata Helana	H. R. Jothipala
1987	Yugayen Yugayata	Ape Adaraya Rasa Geethika	H. R. Jothipala
1987	Hitha Honda Chandiya	Neela Ahase Dili Tharakavo	Vijaya Kumaratunga
1987	Thaththi Man Adarei	Lullaby	
1987	Yukthiyada Shakthiyada	Mal Mandahase	H. R. Jothipala
1987	Kawuluwa	Kuravi Kiraviyan Sinasuna	Amarasiri Peiris
1987	Raja Wedakarayo	Malbara Wasanthe	H. R. Jothipala
1987	Ran Damwel	Lan Wennawado	H. R. Jothipala
1987	Ran Damwel	Oba Kawuda Kimada	Greshan Ananda
1987	Ran Damwel	Nim Nethi Asha	H. R. Jothipala
1987	Ran Damwel	Netha Udawe Mal Vimane	H. R. Jothipala
1987	Obatai Priye Adare	Sagara Lawelle	H. R. Jothipala
1987	Obatai Priye Adare	Vila Ha Piyuma Lesin	H. R. Jothipala
1987	Ahinsa	Nelu Malakiya Vilen Nowa	H. R. Jothipala, Vijaya Kumaratunga, Chandrika Siriwardena
1988	Chandingeth Chandiya	Thaniwee Sirawee	H. R. Jothipala
1988	Gedara Budun Amma	Sooriya Kanthiye	Edward Jayakody
1988	Amme Oba Nisa	Ruwan Wala Vimane	H. R. Jothipala
1988	Amme Oba Nisa	Me Rasa Loke	H. R. Jothipala
1988	Angulimala	Meedum Wala Mal Yayen	
1988	Angulimala	Saduwantha Kumarune Eda	
1988	Newa Gilunath Bangchun	Piyum Dahasak Pipi Diluna	H. R. Jothipala
1988	Satana	Atha Pena Valuka Thalawe	H. R. Jothipala
1988	Newatha Api Ekwemu	Sulalithai Me Jeevithe	
1988	Newatha Api Ekwemu	Desa Pa Detha Pa	
1989	Badulu Kochchiya	Hima Seethala Pinimuthu	
1989	Okkoma Rajawaru	Rosa Male Natuwe Katu	Greshan Ananda
1989	Shakthiya Obai Amme	Lameda Kiri Powa	
1989	Waradata Danduwam	Iranamata Sawoma Gathiwewi	H. R. Jothipala
1990	Dese Mal Pipila	Heen Sere Nuwan Pura	H. R. Jothipala
1990	Dese Mal Pipila	Mage Punchi Mallita	
1990	Dese Mal Pipila	Mal Pare Rosamal Pare	Greshan Ananda
1990	Thanha Asha	Haduwata Bindunata	
1990	Jayashakthi	Ranwan Siyumeliye	Greshan Ananda
1990	Jayashakthi	Asha Weli Yauwanaye	Greshan Ananda
1990	Sambudu Mahima	Sujatha Kiripidu	
1990	Hondin Naththam Narakin	Saliya Mamai Obe	Greshan Ananda
1990	Walawwe Hamu	Aido Ma Da Amanapen	
1990	Walawwe Hamu	Thuruwel Hinahei Thatu Sala	Nuwan Gunawardana
1990	Madhu Sihina	Me Ganga Dhare	Milton Mallawarachchi, Greshan Ananda
1990	Honda Honda Sellam	Halo Sir Good Morning	Greshan Ananda
1990	Honda Honda Sellam	Ma Nethu Dele	Greshan Ananda
1990	Hitha Honda Puthek	Mal Vimane Madhu Ithire	Ananda Perera
1990	Hitha Honda Puthek	Lokaye Landunage Hith Thala	Greshan Ananda
1990	Wana Bambara	Senasima Obai	
1990	Wana Bambara	Mal Kemiye Ran Pirune	Greshan Ananda
1990	Wana Bambara	Dethe Ade Daiva Rekha	Greshan Ananda
1991	Uthura Dakuna	Sathuta Netha Hemadina Ene	
1991	Uthura Dakuna	Kagedo Malrani	Greshan Ananda
1991	Paradeese	Paayana Sanda Vilase	Greshan Ananda
1991	Sihina Ahase Wasanthe	Mal Mawathe Pawi Yamu	Milton Mallawarachchi
1991	Sihina Ahase Wasanthe	Ananda Wenanada Rew Denne	Greshan Ananda, Milton Mallawarachchi, Angeline Gunathilake
1991	Obata Pamanai Adare	Rama Seetha Pem	Greshan Ananda
1991	Obata Pamanai Adare	Eye Reye	Victor Vijayantha
1991	Asai Bayai	Me Apiwa Nodanna	Nuwan Gunawardana, Freddie Silva, Indrani Wijebandara, Angeline Gunathilake
1991	Raja Kello	Yawwana Sithwala	Nuwan Gunawardana
1991	Raja Kello	Ran Ran Ran Supem	Nuwan Gunawardana
1991	Love In Bangokok	Mal Mal Lokaye Malsara	Nuwan Gunawardana
1991	Salambak Handai	Pujawo Jeewithe	Uresha Ravihari
1991	Salambak Handai	Akase Chandravo	H. R. Jothipala
1991	Salambak Handai	Jim Jin Thana Thana	H. R. Jothipala
1991	Cheriyo Doctor	Gee Nada Pawathe	Greshan Ananda
1991	Dhanaya	Ma Sitha Gayana	Greshan Ananda
1991	Alibaba Saha Horu 40	Ma Pembaro	
1991	Alibaba Saha Horu 40	Horen Horen Kohen	
1992	Suwadena Suwandak	Nindak Nidiyala	Greshan Ananda
1992	Suwadena Suwandak	Hangi Hangi Payala	Nuwan Gunawardana
1992	Suwadena Suwandak	Detholen Gilihi Madahase	
1992	Sakvithi Raja	Me Mokadda Manda	H. R. Jothipala
1992	Malsara Doni	Hima Kumari Ma Nam	H. R. Jothipala
1992	Ahimi Dadaman	Jeevithe Man Pethe	T. M. Jayaratne
1992	Sakkara Suththara	Binkundo Binkundo	Angeline Gunathilake
1992	Umayangana	Liyathabara Obai Thawusan	Greshan Ananda, Keerthi Pasquel
1991	Rumathiyai Neethiyai	Deviyan Nodutuwa Api	H. R. Jothipala
1991	Rumathiyai Neethiyai	Payana Thura	H. R. Jothipala
1992	Kulageya	Sanda Piripun Wela	Ivor Dennis
1992	Oba Mata Wiswasai	Pawe Pathum Maliga	Wilbert Anthony
1992	Suranimala	Sangi Sangi Malmada Belme	Greshan Ananda
1992	Sathya	Maldunne Maldara	Greshan Ananda
1992	Sinhayangeth Sinhaya	Me Neth Agin	Greshan Ananda
1993	Rajek Wage Puthek	Hithaka Thiyen Adare	
1993	Rajek Wage Puthek	Awa Soyala Ma	Nuwan Gunawardana
1993	Prathigna	Mal Sigiththa Aye	Rajiv Nanayakkara
1993	Prathigna	Eha Kanden Eha	Rajiv Nanayakkara
1993	Sargent Nallathambi	Sudu Sanda Payana Yame	Rajiv Nanayakkara
1993	Sargent Nallathambi	Awa Prema Sanchare	Milton Mallawarachchi
1993	Weli Sulanga	Ahas Maliga Kavul Dorin	
1993	Weli Sulanga	Sathute Sihina Sina Atharin	Ananda Perera
1993	Come O Go Chicago	Desin Rahasin	H. R. Jothipala
1993	Chaya Maya	Me Ayido	Rajiv Nanayakkara
1993	Chaya Maya	Awado Koi Dese	Rajiv Nanayakkara
1993	Chaya Maya	Monawado Wenne	Rajiv Nanayakkara
1993	Chaya Maya	Ra Yame Sihina Lowin	
1993	Chaya Maya	Maligawe Nelum Pokune	Rajiv Nanayakkara
1993	Yasasa	Malsara Dunu Dara	
1993	Sandareka	Kellange Sina Nelala	Greshan Ananda
1993	Sandareka	Sulan Kode Kohenda Awe	
1993	Lagin Giyoth Aehek Na	Enawado Ahala Me Gee	
1993	Madara Parasathu	Saradhakraye Sihasuna	
1993	Madara Parasathu	Nuwan Kelum Rehenin Obe	Jagath Wickramasinghe
1993	Madara Parasathu	Mamo Werale	Jagath Wickramasinghe
1994	Nohadan Kumariye	Atha Kohedo	Ananda Perera
1994	Dhawala Pushpaya	Divi Man Thalawe	
1994	Abhiyogaya	Tharumal Ranchu	Nuwan Gunawardana
1994	Abhiyogaya	Kiri Muhudu Werale	Nuwan Gunawardana
1994	Sujatha New	Manaranjana Darshaniya Lanka	
1994	Sandamadala	Thith Thith Thith Muwanta	Milton Mallawarachchi
1994	Sandamadala	Heen Podin Wessa Watena	Wijesundara Weragoda
1994	Mawbime Weerayo	Rama Sitha	Greshan Ananda
1994	Aathma	Hima Renu Watena Seethale	Greshan Ananda
1994	Okkoma Hondatai	Roon Roon Bambara Mal	Freddie Silva
1994	Hellow My Darling	Hitiyath Hirawi Api Ge Mulle	Champa Kalhari
1994	Hellow My Darling	Adaren Imuko	Greshan Ananda
1995	Inspector Geetha	Podi Duwe Handanu Epa	Milton Mallawarachchi
1995	Rodaya	Aalen Weli Suwanda	
1995	Ira Handa Illa	Gee Lowa Perada Patan	
1995	Pudumai Eth Aththai	Bewata Mani Mekala	Angeline Gunathilake
1995	Deviyani Sathya Surakinna	Sinawe Rasaya Penwa Na	Priyankara Perera
1995	Chitti	Siyumali Siyumali Rosa Mali	Rookantha Gunathilake
1995	Edath Chandiya Adath Chandiya	Hiru Sandu Wage Hinahila	Milton Mallawarachchi
1995	Edath Chandiya Adath Chandiya	Desa Wesi Giya	
1995	Edath Chandiya Adath Chandiya	Nominiskam Pe	
1995	Cheriyo Captain	Lo Balan Devide	
1995	Cheriyo Captain	Sansara Gee Rawaye	Greshan Ananda
1995	Chandani	Sandewa Me Atha Ime	
1995	Chandani	Ahas Gangawe Payala	Ananda Perera
1995	Chandani	Ma Obe Hitha Lagai	
1995	Chandani	Thama Ase A Ge Pura	
1995	Sudu Walassu	Senehe Bidunoth	Milton Mallawarachchi
1995	Dalulana Gini	Asa Welapedo	Rajiv Nanayakkara
1995	Dalulana Gini	Idunil Rathi Akasaye	Suneth Walpola
1995	Dalulana Gini	Pem Akase Ranwan Rekha	Suneth Walpola
1995	Dalulana Gini	Hiru Amora Welawe	Suneth Walpola
1995	Dalulana Gini	Sede Swarna Ahase	Suneth Walpola
1996	Hitha Hondanam Waradin Na	Sakunthalado	Nuwan Gunawardana
1996	Hitha Hondanam Waradin Na	Pem Geetha Raave Dene	W. Premaratne
1996	Hitha Hondanam Waradin Na	Lokaya Sev Lese	Cletus Mendis, Nuwan Gunawardana
1996	Sebe Mithura Deviyeki	Me Api Wemu	Nuwan Gunawardana, Victor Vijayantha
1996	Sebe Mithura Deviyeki	Kanthi Di Hiru Peyu Se	Nuwan Gunawardana, Victor Vijayantha
1996	Hitha Honda Geheniyak	Baloli Baloli	Greshan Ananda
1996	Hitha Honda Geheniyak	Sudu Sudu Sele Nelawi	Greshan Ananda
1996	Sihina Vimane Raja Kumari	Kaluwara Vee	
1996	Sihina Vimane Raja Kumari	Akasa Ganga	Nuwan Gunawardana
1996	Sihina Vimane Raja Kumari	Adare Soya	Maya Damayanthi
1996	Sihina Vimane Raja Kumari	Raja Kumari	Nuwan Gunawardana, Milton Mallawarachchi
1996	Mal Hathai	Raja Kurulla Dan Mage Athe	Greshan Ananda
1996	Cheriyo Darling	Sudu Suranganavi	Greshan Ananda
1996	Cheriyo Darling	Aale Karannam Romeo Mage	Bandu Samarasinghe
1996	Bawa Sasara	Wedana Mayime	Nuwan Gunawardana
1997	Puthuni Mata Wasana	Shantha Hadawath Kiduriya	Ananda Perera
1997	Puthuni Mata Wasana	Rosa Male Oba Kohido	Sudesh Wasantha Pieris
1997	Puthuni Mata Wasana	Mage Lowe Minipahan	Uresha Ravihari
1997	Surayo Wedakarayo	Sudu Kalu Kiyala	Milton Mallawarachchi
1997	Punaruppaththiya	Shantha Rathriye	Jehan Jeevantha
1997	Ramba Saha Madhu	Oba Lanwi Sihina Payanne	Greshan Ananda
1997	Pem Mal Mala	Sanda Amuthuma Widiyata	Bandu Samarasinghe
1997	Pem Mal Mala	Na Ma Eda	Bandu Samarasinghe
1997	Raththaran Minihek	Saara Vee Karalin Piri	Greshan Ananda
1997	Raththaran Minihek	Awile Laya	
1997	Raththaran Minihek	Premaniya Sihine	Greshan Ananda
1997	Good Bye Tokyo	Bidena Reya Thula Negena	Milton Mallawarachchi, Kamal Addararachchi
1998	Yudha Gini Meda	Arunode Kusum Uyane	Ashoka Pieris
1998	Aeya Obata Barai	Neela Kobeyyo	Kushani Sandarekha
1998	Re Daniel Dawal Migel	Ma Rahasin Amatha	Greshan Ananda
1998	Akkai Nangiyi	Re Yaame	
1998	Girlfriend	Ranga Ranga Awe	Greshan Ananda
1998	Aege Wairaya 3	Desa Nura Mathiveela	
1999	Kolompoor	Nelum Manel Made Pipila	
1999	Kolompoor	Ambanaka Guti Kala	Walter Perera, Morris Dahanayake, Ananda Perera, Freddie Silva, Sunil Hettiarachchi
1999	Seetha Samire	Mal Pokurin Chamara	Greshan Ananda
1999	Seetha Samire	Madusame Hadawathe Viraha	
2000	Danduwama	Habun Katai Bath Dekatai	
2000	Anuragaye Ananthaya	Rosa Kele Sina Sisi	
2000	Anuragaye Ananthaya	Rena Bigun Gayana	Nuwan Gunawardana
2001	Oba Koheda Priye	Ahase Meedum Duhul	
2001	Oba Koheda Priye	Hangaago Adare	Ranjan Ramanayake
2001	Oba Koheda Priye	Me Geethika Me Yaathika	
2001	Oba Koheda Priye	Gori Bori Wada Beda	Freddie Silva, Angeline Gunathilake, Bandu Samarasinghe
2001	Oba Magema Wewa	Sathute Mawathe	
2001	Oba Magema Wewa	Re Ha Diwa Pura	Milton Mallawarachchi
2001	Dinuma Kageda	Aradhana Ayachana	Greshan Ananda
2001	Wasanthaye Kunatuwak	Ma Daruwo Nohadawa	Greshan Ananda
2001	Wasanthaye Kunatuwak	Ma Daruwo Nohadawa	
2003	Jim Pappa	Kumaraya Oyay Pathu	H. R. Jothipala
2004	Clean Out	Oon Onna Mehe Wara	Sangeeth Wickramasinghe, Ananda Perera
2004	Clean Out	Mohothin Dilidu Unath	Prabash Weerasiri
2004	Re Daniel Dawal Migel 3	Apita Hulan	
2005	Sanduni	Lanwee Lanwee	Sudesh Wasantha Pieris
2005	James Bond	Sagara Himiya Soya	Mohideen Baig
2006	Supiri Balawatha	Ramaniya Kamaniya	H. R. Jothipala
2006	Supiri Balawatha	Parama Ramani Ape Aale	H. R. Jothipala
2006	Sonduru Wasanthe	Malsara Hee Sara Wadinne	Nuwan Gunawardana
2006	Sonduru Wasanthe	Sonduru Wasantha	Ananda Perera
2006	Sonduru Wasanthe	Ma Netha Kiwe Dutuda	Ananda Perera
2007	Mr Dana Rina	Ma Upathin Dilidu	Ananda Perera
2007	First Love Pooja	Kadulu Siripoda Sala	
2007	Jundai Gundai	Sagara Himiya Soya	Mohideen Baig
2008	Super Star	Maliga Mauwata Guwane	Milton Mallawarachchi
2008	Super Star	Seetha Pibide Alpawane	
2008	Hathara Denama Soorayo New	Pathum Mallaki Me Jeevithe	
2008	Ai Oba Thaniwela	Sanda Nidana Thani Yahane	Malani Bulathsinhala
2008	Ai Oba Thaniwela	Sinase Salaba Kikini	Ivor Dennis, Lesley Fernando
2008	Ai Oba Thaniwela	Sanda Wathure Ran Tharaka	Milton Mallawarachchi, Greshan Ananda, W. Premaratne
2008	Ai Oba Thaniwela	Dan Dan Munen	Milton Mallawarachchi, Greshan Ananda, Malani Bulathsinhala
2010	Viyapath Bambara	Paavi Aawe Mahade	H.R. Jothipala
2011	Muthu Salamba	Lassana Sundara De	Greshan Ananda
2011	Muthu Salamba	Suwa Wei Meda	
2011	Muthu Salamba	Gaya Waya Ranga Nata	Amith Walpola
2015	Aathma Warusha	Diske Bee	Amith Walpola, Nilushi Helpita
2015	Aathma Warusha	Sanda Ha Ahasa Lese	H.R. Jothipala
2015	Lantin Singho	Pipena Piyuman	Amith Walpola
2017	Appata Siri	Appata Siri Mata Hithaganna	Bandula Wijeweera, Chalaka Chamupathi
2017	Sellam Nethnam Lellam	Malsara Tharuna Hadak	Srilal Abeykoon

== See also ==
- Music of Sri Lanka
- Radio Ceylon
