= Berty Seneviratne =

Sri Lankan filmmaker and actor (1916–1967)

Shanthi Kumar
- ශාන්ති කුමාර්
- Born: Berty Seneviratne; September 16, 1916; Kurunegala, Sri Lanka
- Died: February 22, 1967 (aged 50)
- Education: Trinity College, Kandy
- Occupations: Actor, filmmaker, Choreographer
- Years active: 1943–1967
- Relatives: Herbie Seneviratne (brother)

Berty Seneviratne (16 September 1916 – 22 February 1967 බර්ටි සෙනෙවිරත්න), popularly known by stage name Shanthi Kumar was an actor, filmmaker and choreographer in Sri Lankan cinema. Considered one of the three pioneer film directors in Sinhala cinema, he made the first talkie film of Sri Lankan film history. He has gone down in history as a dancer who amazed India and was honored by an Indian governor.

== Personal life ==
Berty Seneviratne alias Shanthi Kumar Seneviratne was born on September 16, 1916, at the Lihinigiri Palace in Kurunegala, Sri Lanka. His mother was from Subasinghe family of Sandalankawa. He studied as Trinity College, Kandy, and mastered wrestling, rugby and football during school period. Berty's younger brother Richard Herbert alias Herbie Seneviratne was also a popular actor in early Sinhala cinema.

He died on 22 February 1967 at the age of 50.

== Career ==
He later studied English and Latin and went to India to learn dance from popular choreographer Gopinath. During his life in India, he learned Hindi, Tamil, Gujarati, Marathi, Punjabi, Urdu, Malayalam, Telugu and Bengali. He once joined a well-known circus troupe in India and toured all the Indian states where he performed as an actor. At that time he was proficient in Bharatha, Kathakali and Manipuri dances. Meanwhile, he worked as a dance teacher in an art institute in India and later learned the art of drama. He guide and made several prominent Indian students such as Geethabali, Chandralekha, Raja Rani, Rani, Akhtar, Irshad Begum and Seneholatha.

In 1943, while working as the manager of the Great Eastern Theaters in Bombay, he had a desire to go to Sri Lanka and direct a film. However, he did not know the Sinhala language therefore wrote an English screenplay based on the Saliya Ashokamala story in the history of Ceylon. Later, he learned how to write Sinhala from a private teacher. He made several discussions with S.M. Nayagam, J. D. A. Perera and Musician U. D. Perera on making a Sinhala film in early 1945. According to their discussion, the first story to be made into a film was 'Sri Wickrama Rajasinghe'.

On top of that, the board of directors, which wanted to film 'Saliya Ashokamala', held a story competition and announced in the newspapers that the writer who wrote the best story would be given Rs. 500. Among the stories submitted for this competition, the best story was the film story 'Asoka Mala' written by Shanthi Kumar. He has objected to the decision of the film industry to hire an Indian film director to direct the film for Rs. 500. Therefore, he took his script angrily as the board of directors opposed it.

Later in 1947, with the help of Mohammed Gauss, Michael Sannas Liyanage and Sir Chittampalam A. Gardiner, Berty made Sri Lanka's first talkie film Ashokamala. After the success of the film, he later directed the film Eda Rae in 1953. In the film, Berty and Sita Jayawardena played the lead roles. The film Eda Ra has to be adapted for night time as the studio facilities are available at night. But Eda Ra was not as successful as Asoka Mala. In 1957, he made his third directorial venture, Jeewitha Satana. In 1962, he directed the film Sansare and then Heta Pramada Vadi in 1964. The film Heta Pramada Vadi was imitated Tamil adaptation from Kalyana Parisu.

In 1964, his film Kala Kala De Pala Pala De was the adaptation of the Tamil film Irambu Thirai. He was also the first director of the film Suhada Sohoyuro produced by E.A.P. Edirisingha. Berty has also been involved in directing dialogues for two films: the Hindi film 'Milap' titled Salli Epa and the Hindi film 'Insathiyath' titled Manushyathwaya. On November 6, 1966, he wrote two articles on how to make a film.

== Filmography ==
Year	Film	Roles	Ref.
1947	Asokamala	Director, screenwriter, Choreographer, Actor: Saliya	
1953	Eda Rae	Director, screenwriter, actor: Ranjith	
1957	Jewitha Satana	Director	
1962	Sansare	Director	
1963	Suhada Sohoyuro	Director	
1964	Heta Pramada Vadi	Director	
1964	Kala Kala De Pala Pala De	Director	
