= Asoka (1955 film) =

- Directed by: Sirisena Wimalaweera
- Screenplay by: Piyasena Costa
- Produced by: Dharmadasa Kulatunge
- Starring: Ananda Weerakoon, Vinodini, Eddie Yapa, Pushpa Janet
- Music by: Karunaratne Abeysekera (lyrics); Herbert M. Senevirathne (lyrics); Piyasena Costa (lyrics); P. L. A. Somapala (music)
- Release date: 4 March 1955
- Country: Sri Lanka
- Language: Sinhala

Asoka is a 1955 Sri Lankan romantic musical based on the Bollywood film Sheesa.

== Cast ==
- Sumith Bibile as Sarath
- Pushpa Janet as Asoka
- Ananda Weerakoon as Harry
- Punya Heendeniya
- Eddie Yapa as Pattiya
- Benjamin Fernando as Seeya
- D. J. Samarakkody
- Sumith Dissanayake as Doctor
- Prema Kanthi
- Wimala Kumari as Sisi
- Sheela Renuka as Sarath's sister
- S. H. Jothipala as Goviya
- Oliver Silva as Thel Veda
- Dharmadasa Kulatunga as Beggar
- W. Chularatne as Donald
- Noel Perera
- Marcus Perera
- N. R. Dias
- G. S. B. Rani
- Seetha Nanayakkara
- E. Marshall Perera

== Songs ==
The songs were recorded by the cast for the movie and by prominent playback singers for general release:

- "Katharagamey" – Jikki, Dharmadasa Walpola and chorus (lyrics by Abeysekera)
- "Sataneki Jivithe" – Dharmadasa Walpola (lyrics by Abeysekera)
- "Thanivay Upanne" – Mohideen Baig (lyrics by Abeysekera; melody from 1954 Bollywood film Dost)
- "Maruwa Maruwa" – G. S. B. Rani Perera (lyrics by Abeysekera)
- "Payana Sanda Sey" – G. S. B. Rani Perera and Dharmadasa Walpola (lyrics by Piyasena Costa)
- "Adare Sagarey" – G. S. B. Rani Perera
- "Prem Suwandai" – Dharmadasa Walpola and Chitra Somapala (melody from the song Äaja re Baalam" by Sandhya Mukherjee in the Hindi movie Ek Do Teen,1953.)
- "Meka Thama Dewiangai" – Ananda Samarakoon, Dharmadasa Walpola and Mohideen Baig (A. J. Kareem and Haroon Lantra in movie)
- "Loke Sihinayak" – Mohideen Baig and G. S. B. Rani Perera (lyrics by Abeysekera; melody from Hemant Kumar and Lata Mangeshkar's "Jaag Dard-e-Ishq Jaag" in 1953 Bollywood film Anarkali)
- "Prem Pahana Niwa" – Mohideen Baig and G. S. B. Rani Perera (melody from 1953 Tamil movie Avan)
- "Seeya Manamalaya" – Mohideen Baig and Dharmadasa Walpola (Eddie Yapa and A.J. Kareem in movie. Lyrics by Abeysekera)
- "Prem Geethai Sangeethay" – Sathyawathi (Vindoini in movie) melody from : "Mai to chali re piya ke desh" by Geeta Dutt in the Hindi movie "Suhaag Sindoor", 1953
