= Sujatha (1953 film) =

- Poster
- Sinhala: සුජාතා
- Directed by: T. Somasekeran
- Screenplay by: Cinema Story Department
- Produced by: K. Gunaratnam
- Starring: Florida Jayalath, Prem Jayanth, Shanthi Lekha, Dommie Jayawardena
- Cinematography: A. Nadan, M. Masthan, Subbha Rao
- Edited by: Baalu
- Music by: Susarla Dakshinamurthi
- Distributed by: Cinemas Ltd.
- Release date: 26 May 1953
- Country: Sri Lanka
- Language: Sinhala

Sujatha is a 1953 Sri Lankan romantic musical film based on the Bollywood film Bari Behen. It was the most successful Sri Lankan film made up to that time.

== Plot summary ==
The protagonist Sujatha abandons her studies to provide for her young sister Prema after the death of their mother. Their mother had always wanted to secure a good education for Prema and Sujatha sees it fitting to make this sacrifice. When Prema heads to the city however, she is seduced and impregnated by a smooth talking womanizer named Wickie. Wickie dumps Prema who then returns to live with her older sister. They find solace in a caring doctor named Nihal who comes to fall in love with Sujatha.

== Cast ==
- Florida Jayalath as Sujatha
- Prem Jayanth as Nihal
- Shanthi Lekha as Prema
- Dommie Jayawardena as Wickie
- Jemini Kantha as Emily
- David Dharmakeerthi as Mudali
- Bertram Fernando as Perera
- Sunil Premadasa
- Nona Subeida
- Mohideen Baig as Singer
- S. D. Elizabeth
- M. P. Gilman

== Songs ==
- "Premalookaya Niwee" – K. Jamuna Rani and Mohideen Baig,(lyrics by D. T. Fernando)
- "Sumadhura Wey" – K. Rani
- "Ayyo Baa Baa" – Sunil Premadasa, K. Rani and Dharmadasa Walpola
- "Menna Meniko" – Dommie Jayawardena and Swarnalatha
- "Wedena Harede Nage" – K. Jamuna Rani
- "Pem Rella Nage" – K. Rani and Dharmadasa Walpola,(lyrics by D. T. Fernando)
- "Mayawen Mey Loke (Kroodya Dey)" – Mohideen Baig
- "Prema Gange" – K. Rani and Mohideen Baig, (lyrics by D. T. Fernando)
- "Manaranjana Darshaniya Lanka" – K. Rani and chorus
- "Danne Kale" – Swarnalatha and Bertrum Fernando
- "Narilatha Pushpa" – Mohideen Baig
- "Giya Thamayi" – Swarnalatha and Bertrum Fernando (melody from Lata Mangeshkar's "Chori Chori Meri Gali" in 1952 Bollywood film Jaal)
