= Vaadai Kaatru =

- Poster
- Directed by: Premnath Moraes
- Screenplay by: Sembian Selvan
- Based on: Vaadai Kaatru by Sengai Aaliyan
- Produced by: A. Sivadasan; R. Mahendran; S. Gunaratnam
- Starring: A. E. Manoharan
- Music by: Re. Ev. Ladeep
- Production company: Kamalalayam Movies
- Release date: 30 March 1978
- Country: Sri Lanka
- Language: Tamil

Vaadai Kaatru (transl. Northerly wind) is a 1978 Sri Lankan Tamil-language film, directed by Premnath Moraes, based on the novel of the same name by Sengai Aaliyan. The film stars A. E. Manoharan in his lead debut. It was released on 30 March 1978.

== Cast ==
- A. E. Manoharan as Semion
- K. S. Balachandran as Virudhachalam
- S. Yesuratnam as Ponnu
- Dr. Indrakumar as Mariyadas
- A. Francis as Savirimuthu
- K. Kandasamy as Soosai
- K. A. Jawahar as Sudale Shanmugam
- S. S. Ganeshappallai as Sivasambu
- Ladis Veeramani as Peyoti
- K. Ambalavanar as Yusuf
- Chandrakala as Philomena
- Anandharani as Nagamma
- Vasantha Appathurai as Dreesamma
- Jayadevi as Annam
- S. Pararasasingham
- Sivabalan
- Anran Rajan Lampord
- Prakasam
- Tingiri Sivaguru
- Nehru

== Production ==
Vaadai Kaatru, based on the novel of the same name by Sengai Aaliyan, is the debut film for Manoharan in a leading role. The film was shot in the sand dunes of Pesalai in 1977.

== Release and reception ==
Vaadai Kaatru was released on 30 March 1978, and won the Presidential Film Award for Best Story. In retrospect, Sri Lankan-born journalist D. B. S. Jeyaraj has referred to it as the best Sri Lankan Tamil film ever made.

== See also ==
- Sri Lankan Tamil cinema
