= Ulpotha =

Yoga retreat in Sri Lanka

- Rural community and retreat site
- Country: Sri Lanka
- Province: Central Province
- District: Kurunegala District
- Website: www.ulpotha.com

Ulpotha is a retreat site in the Sri Lankan Galgiriyawa mountains that offers Yoga and Ayurveda programmes. A place for digital detox, there is no Internet connection or electricity in Ulpotha, and only vegan meals are served. The site is run by locals, and profits fund a local clinic. Near Ulpotha is a lake and Buddhist temples.

The site was founded by two friends Viren Perera and Giles Scott, who bought the land in 1994 intending it to be a place for partying. However, Giles later met a teacher who inspired him to instead turn the land into a yoga retreat.
