= Sisira Senaratne =

Sri Lankan singer and playback singer

- සිසිර සේනාරත්න
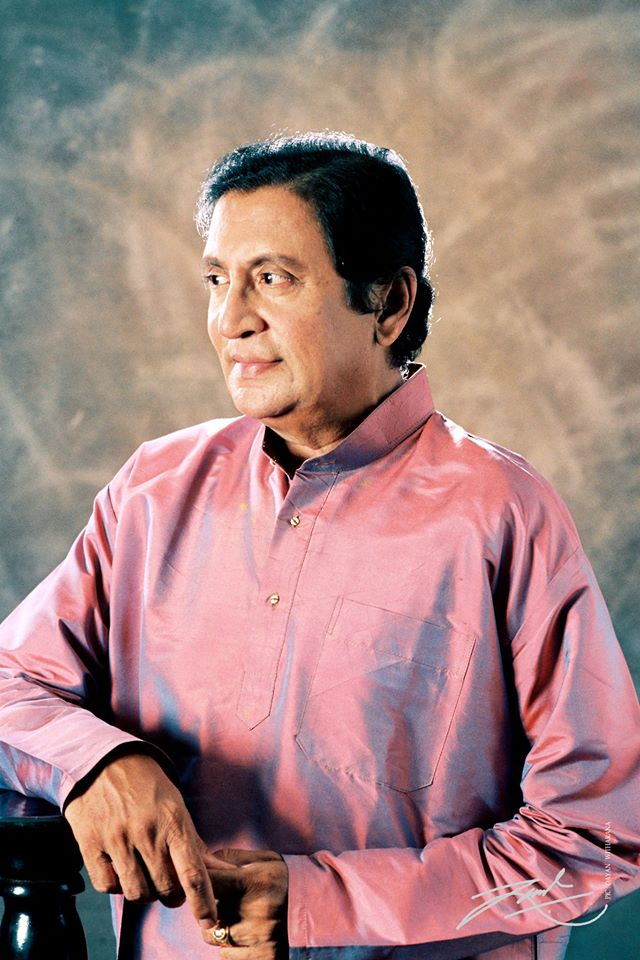
- Born: 29 March 1935; Chilaw, British Ceylon
- Died: 4 February 2015 (aged 79); National Hospital of Sri Lanka
- Resting place: Borella Cemetery
- Education: Maradana Central College; Nalanda College, Colombo
- Occupation(s): singer, playback singer
- Spouse: Indrani Wijebandara (m. 1962)
- Parents: Henry Soloman Senaratne (father); M. A. Leelawathi (mother)
- Awards: Best Music Director; Best Playback Singer
- Musical career
- Genres: soul; Indian classical music
- Instrument: Vocals
- Years active: 1950–2015

Sisira Senaratne (Sinhala: සිසිර සේනාරත්න; 29 March 1935 – 4 February 2015), was a Sri Lankan singer and lyricist who also worked as a playback singer in Sinhala cinema. A career spanning more than six decades, Senaratne has sung several popular songs Olu Nelum Neliya, Seeta Diyareli, Nuhuru Nupuruda, Mage Puthuta Mal, and Gaya Geethayan Game. He along with his wife Indrani Wijebandara played a pivotal role in ushering in a new era in Sinhala music in the 1950s.

== Personal life ==
Sisira was born on 29 March 1935 in Chilaw. He was educated at Maradana Central College and Nalanda College, Colombo. He also worked at Sri Lanka Customs. His father was Henry Soloman Senaratne and mother was M. A. Leelawathi. Sisira's mother died when he was an infant, whereas his father married second time. Therefore he was raised by his grandfather who was an Ayurvedic doctor.

He was married to Indrani Wijebandara, who was also a popular singer. Indrani was born on 15 July 1935 and she was educated at Musaeus College. Sisira and Wijebandara first met at the moment of departure for Madras on an Air Ceylon flight for the music recordings for the film Rekava. They married on 31 May 1962. On 21 June 2019, Indrani was attended to the National Hospital of Sri Lanka due to breathing difficulties. After two days of treatments, she died on 23 June 2019 at the National Hospital at the age of 83. The funeral took place on 27 June 2019 at Borella Cemetery.

The couple has two sons Sanjaya and Sameera; and one daughter Subhani. Eldest son Sanjaya lives in Germany and is married to German lady Anjalika and lives with children. The youngest son Sameera is involved in the singing field and he has his father's voice as well as an executive at Unilever. Subhani was initially educated at Anula Vidyalaya and later from Musaeus College. The two younger brothers are from DS Senanayake College. Subhani is married to Sumith Wijethilaka who is a Hydroelectric Consultant. They have one son Tharindu and one daughter Subhani.

Sisira died on 4 February 2015 at the age of 79 while receiving treatment at the National Hospital of Sri Lanka. Funeral services were held at Borella Cemetery on 7 February 2015.

== Career ==
He started composing songs at the age of twelve, when he wrote and composed his first solo song for the voice of Dharmadasa Walpola. Meanwhile, at the age of 14, T. F. Latheef and Sirisena Wimalaweera made it possible for him to identify Dr. Lester James Peries. Peries selected Sisira for Sri Lanka's first outdoor film as well as Peries' first feature film, Rekava. His song Olu Nelum Neriya Rangala for that film earned him a reputation as one of the most popular playback singers in Sri Lanka. And then he was involved with Herbert M. Seneviratne, Shelton Premaratne for classical songs as well as film playback singing.

He rendered his voice for many films in the 1950s and 1960s, such as Sirakaruwa, Gehenu Geta, Hadisi Vivahaya, Daskon and Wana Mala. He sang duets only with his wife, Indrani.

In 1966, Senaratne won the award for the Best Music Director at the 3rd Sarasaviya Festival for the film Handapana. At the 1st Radio Award Festival in 1970, he won the award for the Best Male Singer for the song Mage Puthuta Mal in the film Punchi Baba. In 1997, he was honored with the "Swarna Jayanthi" Award at the 11th Presidential Film Festival. Sisira had composed the melody for every song sung by Indrani since 1957.

Sisira, with his wife Indrani, conducted concerts titled ‘Sisindra’ in Sri Lanka and around the world, including Canada, the United Kingdom, the United States of America, Dubai, Australia, Germany, Switzerland and Italy. The first "Sisindra" concert in Sri Lanka was held on the 20th at 6.30 pm at the Kularatne Hall of Ananda College, Colombo. The autobiography "Ranpiyawara" written by Wijebandara and the album "Iresha" featuring the songs of the Sisira–Indrani couple were also released on that occasion. The book contains information about their fifty-five-year artistic life.

The Customs Department, where he worked, organized a concert called 'Sisirasa' under the patronage of its Superintendent Ashoka Ratnayake and others.

== Filmography ==
| Year | Film | Role | Ref. |
|---|---|---|---|
| 1955 | Podi Putha | Playback singer | |
| 1956 | Rekava | Playback singer | |
| 1957 | Sirakaruwa | Playback singer | |
| 1957 | Le Kandulu | Playback singer | |
| 1958 | Ekamath Eka Rataka | Playback singer | |
| 1959 | Maa Ale Kala Tharuniya | Playback singer | |
| 1959 | Gehenu Geta | Playback singer | |
| 1959 | Hadisi Vivahaya | Playback singer | |
| 1960 | Wana Mala | Playback singer | |
| 1961 | Jeewitha Poojawa | Playback singer | |
| 1962 | Daskon | Playback singer | |
| 1965 | Handapana | Composer, playback singer | |
| 1965 | Hithata Hitha | Composer | |
| 1968 | Punchi Baba | Composer, playback singer | |
| 1969 | Hari Maga | music director | |
| 1969 | Golu Hadawatha | Playback singer | |
| 1969 | Senehasa | Composer, playback singer | |
| 1969 | Kawuda Hari | Composer, playback singer | |
| 1971 | Samanala Kumariyo | Playback singer | |
| 1973 | Suhada Pathuma | Playback singer | |
| 1976 | Aasha | Playback singer | |
| 1977 | Sudu Paraviyo | Playback singer | |
| 1978 | Mage Ran Putha | Composer, playback singer | |
| 1978 | Deepanjali | Composer | |
| 1981 | Ran Ethana | Composer | |
| 1997 | Punaruthpaththiya | Composer | |
