= Galgiriya Mountain =

Mountain in Sri Lanka

- Galgiriya Kanda
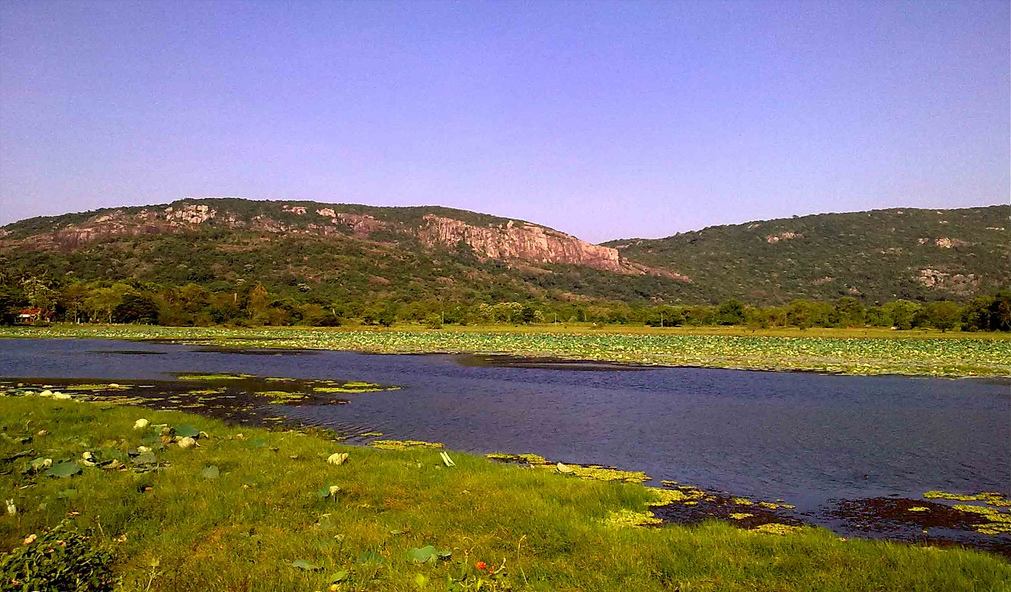
- Galgiriya Mountain seen from a nearby village Diulgane

Highest point
- Elevation: 478 m (1,568 ft)
- Coordinates: 07°56′03″N 80°22′51″E

Geography
- Location within Sri Lanka
- Location: Sri Lanka

Galgiriya Mountain (ගල්ගිරියා කන්ද) is an isolated mountain located in Kurunegala District in Sri Lanka. The mountain is 478 metres (1,568 ft) high and it ranks as the 7th highest mountain in North Western province and the 212th highest mountain in Sri Lanka. Galgiriya Mountain is noted for its unique length about 7 km which is different from other isolated mountains or hills in the area. At present the mountain is a forest reserve as it consists of many types of valuable flora and fauna.

== History ==
The known history of Galgiriya mountain runs as far back to the era of King Dutugemunu. King Dutugamunu had a son named Saliya Raja Kumara. He was an intelligent Prince and conducted many meritorious deeds. This young Prince, fell in love with a beautiful Chandala girl named Asokamala. Prince Saliya was told that he would not be able to become the King, if he continues his love affair with Asokamala. Prince Saliya's love for Asokamala was greater than his desire for the kingdom. Against the wishes of the country, he married Asokamala without any regard to the throne. Prince Saliya fled with Asokamala from Anuradhapura to southern side of the island as his father Dutugemunu strongly opposed their affair. Then they came to the area where Galgiriya mountain is. Later they inhibited at one side of the mountain and even today some historically important places of the mountain confirm these facts. At one end of the mountain there is a temple called Saliya hermitage. It seems that the Prince Saliya settled at the place within a short period of time and started irrigation works near the mountain. As the Galgiriya mountain provides considerable water sources to the water bodies at the bottom of the mountain, Prince Saliya organized these waterways to convert them to the tanks that could supply water to the paddy cultivation which existed there. Today, six such tanks can be found around the mountain at either side. Kuda galawewa, Maha galawewa, Embogama wewa, Gaketiyagama wewa and Kaduruwewa wewa are some of those tanks. But it is hard to confirm that which lakes were built by Prince Saliya.
