= D. T. Fernando =

Sri Lankan lyricist

- Born: 9 February 1909; Sri Lanka
- Died: 14 October 2004 (aged 95)
- Spouse: Yashawathi Peththawadu
- Children: Sanath Fernando, Lanka Fernando, Shantha Fernando, Thissa Fernando, Channa Fernando, Sena Fernando, Punna Fernando, Dhra Fernando.

Danister Thomas Fernando (9 February 1909 – 14 October 2004 ) is a pioneer Sri Lankan lyricist. Some of the pioneers, whose names most people could not even remember were honoured. The oldest lyricist, D. T. Fernando, was a forgotten name.

He first wrote the lyrics to "Shanthame Rathriye" for the film Asokamala in 1947. Later he wrote the famous songs: "Pem kekula pipi enavita mahade", "Premalokaya nivigiya", "Pemrella nagi gal thalle vadi", "Prema gange menik vage", "Jeewana gamana me sansare", "Somibara pamreli mahada nege", "Mihira pennadee ale pe mahade", "Malpethi ralarela athare", "Oo Enna", "Parana thale ape seeyala", "Premaloke Rajabhiseke", "Thirasara Ale Amaraneeyave", and "Nayanaveni Sudo Oba ma".

== Early life and education ==
Danister was born Kalutara, Sri Lanka to Charlis Fernando and Licia Fernando. He had five sisters with one brother. He studied at Kalutara Silver Jubilee boys' school. His father was a wholesale businessmen in North Kalutara. He had shown his vocal talents early as child and he had had many invitations to perform as a child singer during the Vesākha and Poson festivals and he became famous. There was the Vesak song competition organised by Society of Vishakya with North Kalutara and South Kalutara in 1916 and D.T. performed and won top prize. In 1925 when he was 16 years old, he sat for the monitor exam. He was talented and passed (the so-called Guru Sishya Exam) with flying colours. Afterward he entered Nittambuwa Teachers Training College in 1927. It was a great period his life and he taught under Cumaratunga Munidasa. He learned the Sinhala language and literature very well and this knowledge was an influence to his imagination and creativity. During this time Cumaratunga Munidasa had an invitation to teach Sinhala language to S. W. R. D. Bandaranaike. Kumarathunga was forwarded D.T and other four fellows. They conducted class at S. W. R. D. Bandaranaike at Horagolla under the mango tree D.T mentioned, and it was at that time that S. W. R. D. Bandaranaike came to Sri Lanka finish his higher studies. After having teacher's training he had an appointment as an assistant principal at Balapitiya Sidhartha College. Next he worked at Patabandimulla School now called Devananda College for four years and received a promotion to Principal, serving from 1 May 1934 to 3 January 1954.

== Works ==
=== "Shanthame Rathreeye" ===
He was involved in many creations when he was at Patabandimulla School. He produced a few dramas with school students. Shantha Praba is the most memorable production he has done. He met Shanthi Kumar at that time. It was an accident. One day he was finding suitable tinkles for this play at 5th cross street in Colombo at a street music instruments shop. He spend few hours finding out good sounding tinkles he noticed Shanthikumar come into this shop. He asked whether D.T was a music teacher and D.T introduced himself. It was the first step in the friendship of D.T and Shanthikumar.

Shanthi Lekha and her first husband Shanthi Viraj, played the lead roles in Shantha Prabh, the first stage play of Shanthi Lekha in 1942. Shanthikumar was invited to see D.T.'s production and Shanthikumar was very happy and invited him write lyrics for the film Asokamala. D.T was introduced to Mohammed Gauss who was the composer of Asokamala and he went to Kotahena to write lyrics. D.T. mentioned that Mohammed Gauss played foot below at midnight as playing a Gramophone record player and he wrote suitable Sinhala words for those melodies. He wrote his first lyrics for "Shanthame Rathreey" Chandra kanthi de Aloke. He had a feeling about night and he tried describe the calmness and aesthetic of night. The film was released on 9 April 1947. He wrote "Preethe prethee", "Ai kalae yameku ale" lyrics to Asokamala. This was an original composition from Mohammed Gauss with original lyrics by D.T Fernando and was the first time that the Sri Lankan Film history composed original music. Asokamala was directed by Shanthi Kumar Senavirathne / T. R. Goppu.

=== "Peenamuko Kalugange" ===
His brother W.J. Fernando also was a music teacher and while working in Koralawella school noticed W. D. Amaradeva's talent. He noticed Amaradeva playing violin very well at the school. Later Amaradeva's father made a violin and he learned under him. D.T. was introduced to Asokamala film and Amaradeva played under Mohamed Ghouse. Later he went for his higher studies at Bhatkhande Music Institute in Lucknow, India in the middle of 1950. After coming back to Sri Lanka one day, D .T. was travelling from Kalutara to Colombo. Amaradewa also got on the same bus from Moratuwa and they met. Amaradeva invited D.T. to write lyrics for him. D.T. says that he wrote "Peenamuko Kalugange" while travelling on the bus but could not write the last verse because Amaradewa needed to get off at Bambalapitiya.

=== "Other lyrics " ===
Afterwards D.T Fernando he wrote lyrics to:

- 1948 – Kapati Arakshakaya (by Jyotish Sinha)
- 1952 – Eda Ree (by Shanthi Kumar)
- 1953 – Sujatha (by Sirisena wimalaweera) other lyrics Ananda Samarakoon and Sirisena Wimalaweera.
- 1954 – Radala Pilithura (by T.R Sundaram)
- 1954 – Varada kageda (by T R Sundaram)
- 1955 – Seda Sulang (T Somasekaran) some other lyrics Ananda Samarakoon
- 1956 – Duppathage Duka (by T R Sundaram)
- 1957 – Jewitha hatana (by Shanthi Kumar).

== Awards ==
- 1986 O.C.I C Kathalic Award
- 1997 KalaBhushana award
- 1997 Sarasavi Rajatha award
- 1997 presidential award
