= Rekava =

1956 film by Lester James Peries

- Directed by: Lester James Peries
- Written by: Lester James Peries
- Produced by: Lester James Peries
- Starring: Ananda Weerakoon; Somapala Dharmapriya; D. R. Nanayakkara; Myrtle Fernando
- Cinematography: William Blake
- Edited by: Titus de Silva
- Music by: Sunil Shantha (songs); B. S. Perera (music direction and background score); Sisira Senaratne (songs Olu Nelum Neliya Rangala)
- Release date: 1956
- Running time: 89 minutes
- Country: Sri Lanka
- Language: Sinhala

Rekava (Sinhala for "Line of Destiny") is a 1956 film based on village life and mythical beliefs in Sri Lanka (then Ceylon). It was the first Sinhala film to be shot entirely in Ceylon, using outdoor locations across the country. The film is also regarded as the first Sri Lankan production free from Indian influence. At the time, many Sinhala films were remakes of South Indian movies, often failing to reflect the local context and featuring stilted, unnatural dialogue.

Rekava was the debut film of Sri Lankan director Lester James Peries's and also marked the first work of cinematographer Willie Blake. The film received international acclaim and was selected for the main competition at the 1957 Cannes Film Festival.

It is still the only Sri Lankan film nominated for the Palme d'Or. Despite its critical acclaim, Rekava was not a commercial success in Sri Lanka, largely because it broke away from mainstream film conventions such as boy-meets-girl romance, fight sequences, comedic interludes, and Hindi-style musical numbers. Over time, however, it has come to be recognized as one of the most important and best-known Sinhala films, widely regarded as marking the birth of a uniquely Sri Lankan cinema.

On 28 December 2006, the film was screened at the Regal Cinema in Ceylon Theatre at 5 p.m. to commemorate the 50th anniversary of its original premiere, which had taken place in the same theater on 28 December 1956.

== Synopsis ==
The film starts with stilt-walker cum musician Miguel arriving in the village of Siriyala with a monkey that performs antics for the public. Two village thieves try to rob him but a young boy named Sena prevents them. Miguel, who is also a palm reader, reads Sena's palm and predicts that he will become a famous healer and bring dignity to the village.

One day, when Sena and his friend Anula are flying a kite, Anula suddenly loses her eyesight. The local native doctor is unable to restore it but Sena touches her eyes and miraculously Anula begins to see. Sena develops a reputation as a boy with a magical touch.

Sena's father, a notorious money lender, uses Sena's talent to earn money by organizing a healing campaign. A rich landowner brings his son for treatment but the son dies, triggering public outrage against Sena. Even worse, the village suffers a severe drought. Later, peace and tranquility return to Siriyala with Sena's blessings.

=== Cast ===
- Somapala Dharmapriya as Sena
- Myrtle Fernando as Anula
- D.R. Nanayakkara as Sooty
- Iranganie Serasinghe as Kathrina
- N. R. Dias as Podi Mahaththaya
- Winston Serasinghe as Kumatheris
- Shesha Palihakkara as Stilt Walker / Balloon Vendor
- Nona Subeida as Rosalin
- Romulus de Silva as Village Elder
- Mallika Pilapitiya as Premawathie
- Ananda Weerakoon as Nimal
- Mapa Gunaratne as Doctor M. P. Gunaratne
- J. B. L. Gunasekera as Kumatheris's friend
- E. Marshall Perera as Photographer
- Sunila Jayanthi as Dancer

== Music ==
The songs of the film are even heard and praised today. The music and lyrics were composed by Sinhala musical pioneer Sunil Santha and Rev. Fr. Merciline Jayakody, respectively. The music director was B. S. Perera. Lyrics by Fr. Marcelline Jayakodi. Latha Walpola, Indrani Wijebandara, Sisira Senaratne and Ivor Dennis contributed vocals. Sisira Senaratne sang the main song "Olu Nelum Neliya Rangala".
