= Eda Rae =

Eda Rae එදා රෑ
- Directed by: Shanthi Kumar
- Screenplay by: Shanthi Kumar
- Produced by: Ceylon Theaters
- Cinematography: T. S. Maani
- Music by: Mohammed Gauss
- Release date: 14 September 1953
- Country: Sri Lanka
- Language: Sinhala

Eda Rae (Sinhala, That Night) is a 1953 Sri Lankan film directed by Shanthi Kumar Seneviratne and Produced by Sisil Disanayaka. The film stars Sita Jayawardena and Herbie Seneviratne in lead roles whereas Shanthi Kumar, Premnath Moraes and Wanshawathi Daulagala made supporting roles. The music was directed by Mohammed Gauss.

The film achieved some popularity in the country. The musician Latha Walpola debuted as a playback singer in this film.

== Cast ==
- Sita Jayawardena as Chandra
- Herbie Seneviratne as Banda
- Shanthi Kumar as Ranjith
- Premnath Moraes as Lakdasa
- Wanshawathi Daulagala as Maggie
- Dudley Wanaguru as Maggie's brother
- Thilakasiri Fernando
- Latha Walpola
- Austin Abeysekara as Mudali
- Louie Rodrigo as Bonso
- J. H. Jayawardena as Billiards player
- Michel Sannas Liyanage as Victor

== Songs ==
- "Hari Hari Ha Ha" – Herbert Seneviratne and Latha Walpola
- "Anandey" – Rudrani
- "Mage Pana" Louie Rodrigo and group
- "Saa Maa Daa Saa" – Rudrani and Mohideen Baig
- "Nayana Rasi Wey" – Rudrani and Mohideen Baig
- "Davi Gini Jalayen" – Rudrani
- "Habata Mage" – Herbert Seneviratne and Latha Walpola
- "Sidara Aley" – Mohideen Baig
- "Haridey Pem Githa Rase" – Mohideen Baig and Rudrani
- "Ho - Dulevi Prema Dhara" – Mohideen Baig and Rudrani
- "May Prithi Prithi Darling" – Herbert Seneviratne and Latha Walpola
- "Gee Nade Shantha" – Mohideen Baig
