= Ananda Weerakoon =

Sri Lankan actor (1934–2022)

- ආනන්ද වීරකෝන්
- Born: Don Ananda Weerakoon; September 20, 1934; Wellampitiya, Sri Lanka
- Died: 21 September 2022 (aged 88)
- Education: Nalanda College Colombo
- Years active: 1955–1960

Don Ananda Weerakoon (Sinhala:ආනන්ද වීරකෝන්; 20 September 1934 – 21 September 2022) was a Sri Lankan actor.

== Life and career ==
Early life

Ananda was born as only son in a family of five children to parents Don William Weerakoon and Amarawathi Kalansuriya. He was educated at Nalanda College Colombo and was also a Bachelor of Arts degree holder. Since school days he had been keenly interested in history and arts. He first participated in a dance to welcome the Queen Elizabeth II's visit to Ceylon together with Shesha Palihakkara and Titus Thotawatte at the Colombo Regal Hall.

Film acting

He first started acting in a film as a young boy called "Harry" in one of the films directed by Sirisena Wimalaweera. Later on Ananda had been acting in many films directed by Sirisena Wimalaweera such as Asoka (1955 film) and Lester James Peries's Rekava film. In 2021, he was honored with lifetime achievement award during the ceremony held for 21 artists who made an invaluable contribution to Sinhala cinema in the early decades of Sinhala Cinema.

Stay in England

In 1960, Ananda moved to the United Kingdom and since then he worked as an insurance agent in London for 29 years.

Weerakoon died on September 21, 2022, at the age of 88.

== Filmography ==
Year	Film	Role	Ref.
1955	Asoka	Harry	
1955	Podi Putha		
1956	Rekava	Nimal	
1957	Sukumali	Vijaya	
1957	Jeewitha Satana		
1959	Ma Ale Kala Tharuniya	Jayasena	
1960	Wana Mala		
