= Asokamala =

Asokamala අසෝකමලා
- Directed by: Shanthi Kumar / T. R. Goppu
- Screenplay by: Shanthi Kumar
- Produced by: Sir Chittampalam A. Gardiner
- Starring: Shanthi Kumar, Emaline Dimbulana
- Cinematography: M. Masthan
- Music by: D. T. Fernando (lyrics); Mohammed Ghouse (music)
- Release date: April 9, 1947
- Country: Sri Lanka
- Language: Sinhala

Asokamala is a 1947 Sri Lankan historical film co-directed by Shanthi Kumar and T. R. Goppu and produced by Sir Chittampalam A. Gardiner. It was the second film made in the Sinhala language and the first by a Sinhalese director. It also was the first film that W. D. Albert Perera (later known as Amaradeva), Mohideen Baig and Mohammed Ghouse contributed to. The melodies of the film's songs were original compositions by Mohamed Ghouse- a departure from what was to be the copying of Indian melodies in the time to come.

== Plot ==
Prince-heir Saliya gives up the throne to marry the commoner Asokamala.

== Cast ==
- Shanthi Kumar as Saliya 'Kumara'
- Evelyn Dimbulana as Asoka Mala
- Michael Sannas Liyanage as Senadhipathi Vipula 'Senevi'
- Herbie Seneviratne as Sena 'Kumara'
- Don Edward as Ran Kira 'Appucha'
- Austin Abeysekara as Abhaya 'Appa'
- Michael Rodrigo as Maharaja Dutugemunu
- Srimathi Karunadevi as Chitra
- W. D. Amaradeva as Swami
- Sunil Premadasa as Vinitha
- Peter Siriwardena as Mahadavan

== Production ==
This movie was shot at Central Studios in Coimbatore, India as was many other Sinhala films that were shot in Madras Presidency in center like Madras, Coimbatore and Salem.

The person who was in charge of Asokamala production in India was Mr Manuel Saverimuttu.He was the General manager of Celyon theatres during Chitambalam Gardner days.

== Songs ==
- "Bhave beetha hera" – W. D. Albert Perera (Pandith W.D. Amaradewa)
- "Prithi Prithi" – Bhagyarathi and chorus (lyrics by D.T. Fernando)
- "Ho Premey Babaley" – Mohideen Baig and Bhagyarathi
- "Shantha Mey Rathriye" – Bhagyarathi (Lyrics by D.T. Fernando)
- "Aaley Mage" – Mohideen Baig
- "Ai Kare Yamak Aley" – W. D. Albert Perera (Pandith W.D. Amaradewa, lyrics by D.T. Fernando)
- "Jale Mey Dane" – Bhagratathi
- "Nayana Wani Sudo" – Mohideen Baig and Bhagyarathi (lyrics by D.T. Fernando)
- "Aloke Dey" – Bhagyarathi (lyrics by D.T. Fernando)
- "Suduwa Jaya Sri" – Mohideen Baig and chorus
