= Mohammed Ghouse =

Mohd Ghouse is an Indian politician from Old City Hyderabad, ex corporator to All India Majlis-e-Ittehadul Muslimeen from Charminar, who served the party for more than two decades. He quit AIMIM and joined]. and again joined AIMIM.
