= Sengai Aaliyan =

Sri Lankan Tamil writer

Kanthaiya Kunarasa (Senkaiahliyan)
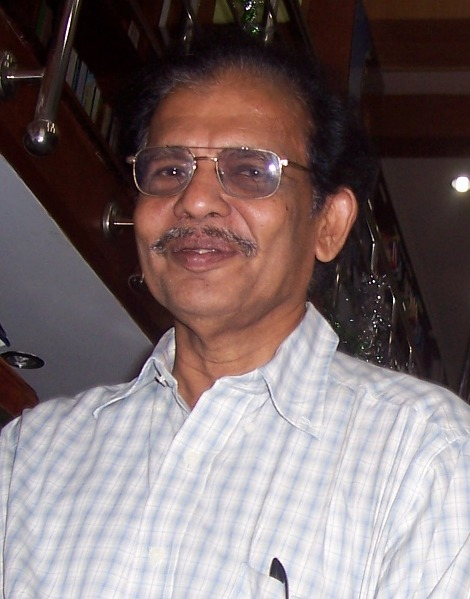
- Born: 25 January 1941; Vannarpannai, Jaffna, Island of Ceylon and its Dependencies
- Died: 28 February 2016 (aged 75); Jaffna, Sri Lanka
- Occupation: Author

Kanthaiya Kunarasa or Senkaiahliyan (In Tamil : செங்கை ஆழியான்) was a Sri Lankan Tamil writer who emerged after the 1960s. He is also the author of several non-fiction books. He also served as the registrar of the University of Jaffna.

== Biography ==
Kunarasa was born in 1941 in Jaffna and died on 28 February 2016. He graduated from the University of Ceylon, Peradeniya and later on obtained his Doctorate in Geography (Land use and Land settlement) from the University of Jaffna. Not only a prolific writer, he was also a well known critic in the literary world. He has more than thirty novels and three accomplishments in the sphere of fictional history to his credit. Kunarasa was awarded the Sahithiya Mandala awards more than six times for his achievements in writing Novels and short stories. Some of his short stories had been translated into Sinhala and published in weeklies such as Silumina, Vivarana, Ravaya, and so on. One of his novels, named 'The Beast', was translated into English.

== Books written ==
Book	Type	Meaning in English
Nanthikadal	Legend	Sea of Bull
Aachi Payanam Pagiral	Comedy	Grandma is on a Trip
Akkinikunju	Short Fiction	Firebird
Theemtharikitathom	Novel	
Yalpanathu Rathirigal	Short Fiction	Nights in Jaffna
Vadaikkattu	Novel	The Dry Wind
Iravinmudivu	Novel	The End of a Night
Piralayam	Novel	The Tragedy
Kataru	Novel	The Flood
Kanavugal Katpanaigal Aasaigal	Novel	Dreams and Desires
Gangai karai oram	Novel	At the Riverbank
Alaikadalthan Oyatho	Novel	Will the Sea Calm Down?
Chithrapournami	Short Fiction	Full Moon
Muttathu Ottaipanai	Novel	Palmyra at the Entrance
Ithayame amaithikol	Short Fiction	Calm Down my Dear Mind
Yanai	Novel	The Beast
Malaiyil nanainthu Veyilil kainthu	Novel	Caught in the Sunlight and Rain
Malaikaalam	Novel	The Rainy Season
Mannin thagam	Novel	Thirst of the Land
Kanthavel kottam	Legend	Lord Muruga's Kingdom
Janmaboomi	Novel	The Motherland
Yagakundam	Novel	
Aaru kal madam	Novel	The Lodge
Kiduguveli	Novel	The Fence
O! Antha alagiya palaya ulagam	Novel	Oh! that nice old days
Koththiyin Kathal	Comedy	The Love of Koththi
Katil kalakum perumoochugal	Novel	The Breath
Orumaiya vattangal	Novel	Circles of One Centre
Kadal kottai	Legend	The Fort in the Sea
Kuveni	Legend	Kuveni The Yaksha Princes
Kavodai	Novel	
Pootha theevu puthirgal	Novel	Mysterious Island
Iravu near payanigal	Short Fiction	Night Time Travellers
Kolumbu Lodge	Novel	The Colombo Lodge
Maranangal malintha boomi	Novel	The Land of Deaths
Pore née po	Novel	War Go Away!
Vanum kanal soriyum	Novel	Fire From the Sky
Koodillatha natthaigalum Odillatha aamaaigalum	Short fiction	
Sambavi	Short fiction	Sambavi

== Researches ==
Book	Meaning
Nallai nagar nool	The book of Nallur
Eelaththavar varalaru	History of Eelam people
Yalpana kottai varalaru	History of Jaffna fort
24 mani neram	24 hours
12 mani neram	12 hours
Meendum Yalpanam Erigirathu	Jaffna is burning again
Thamilar thesam	The Tamil Nation

== Other books ==
Book	Meaning
Marumalarchi sirukathaigal	Short stories of Marumalarchi
Eelakeasari sirukathaigal	Short stories from Eelakeasari magazine
Muniyappathasan sirukathaigal	Short stories by Muniyappathasan
Sambanthar sirukathaigal	Short stories by Sambanthar
Cartoon Ulagil naan by S.Sundar	Biography
Eelathu munnodi sirukataigal	Leading Short stories of Eelam
Mallikai sirukathaigal	Short stories from Mallikai magazine

== See also ==
- List of Tamils of Sri Lanka
- Tamil language
- Tamil literature
