= Indrani Wijebandara =

Sri Lankan vocalist and playback singer (1935–2019)

- Born: 15 July 1935; Borella, British Ceylon
- Died: 23 June 2019 (aged 83); National Hospital of Sri Lanka
- Education: Musaeus College
- Occupations: Singer, playback singer
- Spouse: Sisira Senaratne (m. 1962)
- Parents: M. M. W. Wijayabandara (father); Lilian Wijayabandara (mother)
- Awards: Rana Thisara Award
- Musical career
- Genres: soul; Indian classical music
- Instrument: Vocals
- Years active: 1953–2016
- Labels: Columbia

Indrani Wijebandara (Sinhala: ඉන්ද්‍රානි විජේබණ්ඩාර; 15 July 1935 – 23 June 2019), was a Sri Lankan singer, also worked as a playback singer in Sinhala cinema. A career spanned for more than six decades, she has sung several popular children's songs Vesak Kekulu, Sudu Sanda Eliye, Olu Nelum Neriya, Rathu Pata Mal and Mal Sutikko. She along with husband Sisira Senaratne played a pivotal role in ushering in a new era in Sinhala music in the 1950s.

== Personal life ==
She was born on 15 July 1935 in Borella as the eldest of the family. She completed education from Musaeus College and then from Devi Balika Vidyalaya. Her father M. M. W. Wijayabandara worked at Department of Health. Her mother Lilian Wijayabandara was a housewife. He has four younger siblings.

Indrani was married to Sisira Senaratne, who was also a popular singer. Sisira was born on 29 March 1935 and educated at Central College Maradana and Nalanda College Colombo. He also worked at Sri Lanka Customs. Wijebandara and Sisira first met at the moment of departure for Madras on an Air Ceylon flight for the music recordings for the film Rekava. They married on 31 May 1962 after seven years of affair. The couple has two sons Sanjaya and Sameera; and one daughter Subhani. Sisira died on 4 February 2015 at the age of 79.

Eldest son Sanjaya lives in Germany and is married to German lady Anjalika and lives with children. The youngest son Sameera is involved in the singing field and is an executive at Unilever.

On 21 June 2019, she was admitted to the National Hospital of Sri Lanka due to breathing difficulties. After two days of treatments, she died on 23 June 2019 at the National Hospital at the age of 83. The funeral took place on 27 June 2019 at Borella Cemetery.

== Career ==
The primary school music teacher Eva Perera was the first to recognize her singing ability. She was the student who presented by Musaeus College to the 'Kokila Battle Poetry Competition' organized by the Young Buddhist Association. She became the first on the island. She was able to accompany singer Susil Premaratne on the song Somnasa Ho Santhapaya as well as sing in Sri Chandraratne Manawasinghe's radio dramas. After the introduction to Sunil Shantha at the age of 12 by Father Marcelline Jayakody, she joined the special singing programs to mark the 25th anniversary of the radio. She entered the stage with the play Sakunthala which was staged at the school. She was also the lead singer of the choir of the next play, Sirisangabo.

As a child artist when she joined with 'Sarasawathi Mandapaya' at Radio Ceylon led by Karunaratne Abeysekera. Her voice was heard on the radio world in a song in the radio drama Esala Sanda by K.A.W. Perera, a family friend and later a popular filmmaker. Her first song was Thun Loka Guru Budu Sasi Piya. At the same time, the song Somnasa Saha Santhapaya became very popular where she sang with Susil Premaratne. Under the guidance of Sarath Wimalaweera as well as Susil Premaratne, she was allowed to sing on a Columbia Records album. Thilakasiri Fernando was her supporting singer.

Later, Indrani sang the popular song Ayubowan Vasanawan on a Columbia record to Abeysekera's lyrics. At a young age, she benefitted from the company of lyricists such as Dunston de Silva, W. D. Amaradeva, Edwin Samaradiwakara, Sri Chandraratne Manawasinghe and Mahagama Sekara. When she was a student at Devi Balika, she was invited to sing for movies.

Wijebandara entered the playback singing with the 1956 film Rekhava directed by Lester James Peries and sang two songs in it: Vesak Kekulu, Sudu Sanda Eliye. Due to the popularity of 'Rekhawa' songs, K. Gunaratnam, the owner of Cinemas Production House, got her to sing Hithannako Ayye in the movie Sooraya at the Modern Studio in Salem, India. During this period, she sang several popular songs such as, Budu Samine, Hithannako Ayye, Olu Nelum Neriya, Dangakari Man, Gaya Geethayan, Sal Sapu Mal, Sujathaa, Nilmini Dese and Mal Sutikko.

She also worked as a playback singer in films including Pravesamwanna, Deyyange Rate, Handapana Senehasa and Sudu Sande Kaluwala. Sisira had composed the melody for every song sung by Indrani since 1957. She also won the 'Deepashika' award in 1959.

Wijebandara, with his husband Sisira, conducted concerts titled ‘Sisindra’ in Sri Lanka and around the world, including Canada, the United Kingdom, the United States, Dubai, Australia, Germany, Switzerland and Italy. The first "Sisindra" concert in Sri Lanka was held on the 20th at 6.30 pm at the Kularatne Hall of Ananda College, Colombo. The autobiography "Ranpiyawara" written by Wijebandara and the album "Iresha" featuring the songs of the Sisira– Indrani couple were also released on that occasion. The book contains information about their fifty-five-year artistic life.

In 2000, she was honored with Pioneering Award at 13th Presidential Awards ceremony. In 2001, she was honoured with OCIC Award. In 2007, she was honoured with 'Rana Thisara Award' at Sarasaviya Festival.

== Filmography ==
Year	Film	Role	Ref.
1956	Rekava	Playback singer	
1957	Sooraya	Playback singer	
1958	Deyyange Rate	Playback singer	
1958	Daskama	Playback singer	
1959	Ma Aale Kala Tharuniya	Playback singer	
1959	Purusha Rathnaya	Playback singer	
1959	Sri 296	Playback singer	
1959	Sirimali	Playback singer	
1960	Wana Mala	Playback singer	
1961	Suvineetha Lalani	Playback singer	
1962	Sansare	Playback singer	
1963	Adata Wadiya Heta Hondai	Playback singer	
1963	Mangalika	Playback singer	
1964	Samiya Birindage Deviyaya	Playback singer	
1965	Handapana	Playback singer	
1965	Hithata Hitha	Playback singer	
1967	Daru Duka	Playback singer	
1968	Punchi Baba	Playback singer	
1968	Hangi Hora	Playback singer	
1969	Senehasa	Playback singer	
1969	Kawuda Hari	Playback singer	
1969	Praveshamwanna	Playback singer	
1973	Suhada Pethuma	Playback singer	
1976	Aasha	Playback singer	
1978	Mage Ran Putha	Playback singer	
1978	Deepanjali	Playback singer	
1979	Hari Pudumai	Playback singer	
1981	Ran Ethana	Playback singer	
1982	Situ Diyaniya	Playback singer	
1984	Chandi Siriya	Playback singer	
1997	Punaruthpaththiya	Playback singer	
