= Dharmadasa Walpola =

Sri Lankan singer (1927-1983)

Dharmadasa Walpola ධර්මදාස වල්පොල
- Born: 27 November 1927; Deiyannewela, Kandy, British Ceylon
- Died: 25 December 1983 (aged 56); Colombo, Sri Lanka
- Occupation: Singer
- Spouse: Latha Walpola (1958-1983)
- Children: 4 including Dhammika Perera; Amith Walpola
- Parents: Charles Appuhamy (father); Karunawathie (mother)
- Relatives: Mahinda Bandara (son-in-law); Raju Bandara (cousin son)
- Musical career
- Genres: Pop; soul; rhythm and blues; Country music
- Instruments: Vocals, flute, harmonium, tabla, violin
- Years active: 1949–1983
- Labels: Tharanga; HMV; Columbia

Dharmadasa Walpola (Sinhala: ධර්මදාස වල්පොල) (27 November 1927–25 December 1983), was a Sri Lankan singer. He is the most prominent Sri Lankan male playback singer of the 1950s and 1960s in Sinhala cinema with a career spanning more than three decades. Walpola was an accomplished musician adept at playing the flute, harmonium, violin and tabla.

== Biography ==
=== Early life ===
Walpola's father Charles Appuhamy aka "Palis Ayya" worked with costumes for the Tower Hall theater, where his mother Karunawathie was a housewife. Walpola had to forgo his education at a young age to support his family and for a time built masks for the Sri Lankan army. At that time he won a role in Sirisena Wimalaweera's play Amma singing a virindu. He subsequently acted and sang in the play Wessanthara as well.

To master the flute, Walpola began taking lessons from Eddie Master and then attended R. A. Chandrasena's Academy. Chandrasena was impressed by Walpola's ability to sing and after auditioning several songs with harmonium accompaniment, sent a good word to the Radio Ceylon broadcaster Thevis Guruge. Guruge gave Walpola a sarala gee programme with a duet partner G. S. B. Rani Perera.

=== Playback singing (1953-1965) ===
Walpola debuted as a playback singer in the 1953 film Prema Tharangaya alongside his future wife Rita Jenevi Fernando. Around 1956, Walpola married Fernando who subsequently adapted the name Latha Walpola. From his debut to the early 1960s, Walpola dominated male playback singing in Sri Lankan cinema providing a counterpoint to the harsh Carnatic style of Mohideen Baig with his softer more melodic voice which lends itself to love songs. His best known work from this period include "Seeya Manamalaya" from Asoka (1955), "Amu Pitisareyeki" from Seda Sulang (1955), "Upatha Labaa" and "Suba Aasiri (Hanika Yamang)" from Mathalang (1955), "Surathalee" from Surathalee (1956), "Katey Kiri Suwanda" from Sandesaya (1960), "Oya Belma" and "Waththe Wetunu Pol Athu" from Kurulu Bedda (1961) and "Man Mula Wela" from Deepashika (1963).

Walpola's dueting partners included Vivienne de Silva Boralessa, Chitra Somapala ("Pem Suwandai") and Rukmani Devi in addition to Latha.

=== Later life ===
Walpola successfully returned to Radio Ceylon with "Uthama Muni Dalada" (lyrics by Ajantha Ranasinghe and music by Sanath Nandasiri).

Walpola served as a music teacher later on in his life. He died on 25 December 1983.

== Personal life ==
Dharmadasa Walpola was married to Latha Walpola and had five children; Amith Walpola, Dhammika Walpola, Chaminda Lolitha Walpola, Suneth Walpola and Sumith Walpola, who have already entered the music industry.
