= Mohammed Gauss =

India-born Sri Lankan composer

Mohammed Gauss මොහොමඩ් ගවුස්
- Born: India
- Died: Sri Lanka
- Other names: Mohamed Ghouse; Gauss Master
- Occupations: musician, composer

Mohammed Gauss also known as Mohamed Ghouse (Sinhala: මොහොමඩ් ගවුස්), was a Sri Lankan film music composer. His compositions for Sinhala cinema in the 1950s are credited by music critics as having been influential in developing a Sri Lankan style of film composition distinct from that of Indian films.

== Career ==
He came to Sri Lanka to provide music for Nurthi dramas under the invitation of popular Sri Lankan dramatist John de Silva. Gauss Master worked for the Columbia Records Company. Although Gauss was keen to compose Sinhala songs using lyrics to Indian songs, he soon turned to composing solo songs. He did that experiment with the songs he composed for the film Ashokamala. At the moment, Gauss recognized Mohideen Baig and Albert Perera (later became W. D. Amaradeva).

Baig and Amaradeva went to India with Gauss Master to record songs. This time Amaradeva is in Gauss Master's band as a musician. But Gauss Master transformed Amaradeva to a singer there. Not only that, Gauss master made Amaradeva as the assistant music director of the Ashokamala, where the role assistant music director was first initiated in the current film catalog. Gauss Master introduces Latha Walpola from the film Eda Ra based on her singing ability. Meanwhile, he composed the song Thirasara Aale Amaraniya We sung by Amaradeva as well as the song Nayana Wani Sudo for Mohideen Baig.
