= Mohideen Baig =

Sri Lankan musician

Mohiden Baig මොහිදින් බෙග්
- Born: Kareem Mohideen Baig; 5 December 1919; Tamil Nadu, India
- Died: 4 November 1991 (aged 71); Colombo, Sri Lanka
- Resting place: Kuppiyawatta Muslim Cemetery
- Education: Salem Junior School
- Occupation: Singer
- Spouse: Sakina Baig (m. 1947)
- Children: 8
- Parents: Kareem Baig (father); Bijan B (mother)
- Musical career
- Genres: soul; Indian classical music
- Instrument: Vocals
- Years active: 1934–1991
- Label: Columbia

Kala Suri Alhaj Kareem Mohideen Baig (Sinhala: මොහිදින් බෙග්, Arabic: محي الدين بيك; 5 December 1919 – 4 November 1991), popularly known as Mohidin Beg, was a Sri Lankan musician. One of the most influential singers in Sinhala music, Baig is known particularly for his Buddhist devotional music. He was a Muslim who moved to Sri Lanka from Salem in Tamil Nadu, but of Hyderabadi Muslim origin. He was considered a highly influential multicultural figure in the country's arts history. Baig is the first award winning citizen of Sri Lanka.

== Personal life ==
Born on 5 December 1919 in Salem South India as the third of the family, Baig belonged to the Pathan tribe. Baig's paternal lineage is descended from a pro-Islamic lineage with a centuries-old history. His father Kareem Baig served as a police officer in Salem. Bijan B was his mother. He was educated at a school in Salem, received his primary education in music from several music teachers in Salem and was particularly talented in singing Urdu and Qawali songs.

Kareem and Bijan were the parents of fourteen children, three of whom died in infancy. Baig came to Ceylon in 1931. During this time, Baig's grandfather, Halaldine worked for the Grandpass police and Mohideen's older brother, Aziz worked for the Harbor police. He returned Sri Lanka (then as Ceylon) due to untimely death of his brother Aziz by a boat accident in 1931. At the age of 18, Baig joined the Sri Lanka Army.

Baig was married in 1947 to his own cousin, Sakina Baig. They had 8 children, which include 5 sons – Usman, Haider, Mubarak, Ishaq and Ilyas; and 3 girls – Rabia, Salima and Moina. His two sons, Ishaq and Ilyas are popular singers who continue the father's legacy.

He also visited Mecca in 1987 under the patronage of Pakistani President Muhammad Zia-ul-Haq. It is said that the president invited him to return to his permanent residence in Pakistan. Baig got his name "Alhaj" after his journey to Mecca.

Baig was scheduled to perform in England on 13 and 14 November 1991. Before that he thought of curing his eye ailment. On 3 November 1991, Baig was admitted to a private hospital in Colombo for cataract removal surgery. On the next day, Baig died from an unexpected infection during the surgery. Medical reports stated that the cause of his death was a complication caused by a mismatch between blood pressure and anesthesia. Following Islamic traditions, his funeral was organized within a day and buried at Kuppiyawatta Muslim Cemetery.

== Career ==
During Baig's arrival, he met another Indian Mohammed Gauss, who was born in South India and came to Sri Lanka. Beg participated in the dignitaries' conclave in Colombo with Gauss master. Around that time, Beg was inspired to sing Sinhala songs composed to Hindi tunes at the request of Gauss Master and U.D. Perera. In 1932, Beg was fortunate to sing on Gramophone disc produced by Columbia Records. His first recorded song is Karuna Muhude Namu Gilila sung with K. K. Rajalakshmi at the age of 18. He was a Grade A Singer of the Radio Ceylon who had the ability to singing songs in about four languages.

In 1947, Baig made his singing and acting debut with Shanthi Kumar Seneviratne's film Asokamala and sang the popular song Preethi Preethi. He was given the opportunity to playback singing for the film Umathu Vishwasaya by renowned actor and songwriter Herbert M. Seneviratne. In that film, he made the duet song Sudata Sude with Rukmani. However, he did not get a chance to sing with Rukmini on gramophone discs as they both belong to two competing disc companies – Colombia and His Master's Voice respectively. Later, he made several playback duets with songstress and actress Rukmani Devi for the films Iranganie, Mathabedhaya, Perakadoru Bena and Daivayogaya.

In 1956, Baig was fortunate enough to sing the song 2500 Buddha Jayanthi Babalewa Lanka during the Buddha Jayanthi celebrations. Later, Prime Minister S.W.R.D. Bandaranaike awarded Baig with a Distinguished Citizenship in the same year. Meanwhile he sang Buddhist devotional music and achieved fame with songs such as Buddham Saranam, Maayaa, Giri Hel Mudune, Aadara Nadiya Gala, Pem Mal Maala, Wella Simbina Rella, Anna Sudo, Thaniwai Upanne, and Loke Sihinayak Wageya. This popularity led to appearances at distinguished events such as the country's first Independence Day Ceremony. His Buddhist song Suwande Mata Seethala has been highly popularized in Sri Lanka, where there is hardly a Vesak, Poson festival, pandal, lantern, dansal or any other Buddhist festival in the country where this song is not heard.

In 1960, to celebrate the 2500th Buddha Jayanthi, AngulimaalHindi movie, financed by the Thai government was released. This movie was dubbed in Sinhala dialogues and Mohideen Baig sang the popular song Buddham Saranam previously sung by Indian singer Manna Dey. Baig went to India to record this song of13.5 minutes. Meanwhile, he also sang a lot of radio simple songs including, Tikiri Menike and Awilla Awilla Sinhala Awurudda. Baig has dueted with H. R. Jothipala, G.S.B. Rani Perera, Latha Walpola, Sujatha Attanayake and K. Jamuna Rani among others.

In 1956, Baig also won the Sarasaviya Award for the Best Playback Singer for the film Allapu Gedara for the song "Piya Salamu Igilli" In the same year, Baig also sang the welcome song in Urdu at the 1976 Non-Aligned Movement Conference in Sri Lanka. In 1982, country's first Kala Suri Award was given to Baig and seven other artists. For the film Sujatha, he playback songs Narilatha Pushpe, Prema Gange Menik and Mayawathi Me Loke were highly popularized. He is also the only Sri Lankan to duet with Lata Mangeshkar in the film Seda Sulang for the song "Idiriyata Yamu Sawoma". At the 1974 Deepashika Awards, he won the Deepashika Award for Best Singer for a most number of films.

Baig has participated in several foreign concerts including 1986 London Music Concert. He last attended an outdoor concert in Wanathamulla, three days before the death in 1991. Baig was an indispensable artist in Sinhala cinema at that time where his voice brought great grandeur to the creation. As a result, he has sung in about 450 Sinhala films with over 9000 songs on the radio, including simple songs and cassettes.

== Legacy ==
On 14 July 2018, The University Arts Association has decided to hold a national commemoration ceremony to mark the first birth centenary of Mohideen Baig. The event was held free of charge at 5.00 pm at the "Govisevana" Grounds in Singakkuliya.

On 20 February 2020, a commemorative stamp was issued in memory of Baig at the Postal Headquarters under the patronage of Prime Minister Mahinda Rajapaksa.
