= List of Sri Lankan films of the 1950s =

Films produced in Sri Lanka in the 1950s.

== 1950 ==
Title	Director	Cast	Genre	Notes
1950
Gambada Sundari	George S. Wijegunaratne	Sheela Peiris, Kingsley Jayasekera, E. C. Bulathsinhala, Vincent de Paul Peiris, Herbert Perera, Tilaka Siriwardena	Drama	Released on 27 January. First Sinhala colour movie produced in Ceylon. Only one was copy printed. A colour documentary on Kandy Esala Perahera was shown.
Hadisi Vinishchaya	B. A. W. Jayamanne	Rukmani Devi, B. A. W. Jayamanne, Bertram Fernando, Mabel Blythe, Stanley Mallawarachchi, Eddie Jayamanne, Herbie Seneviratne	Drama	Released on 26 May.

== 1951 ==
Title	Director	Cast	Genre	Notes
1951
Seedevi	Sirisena Wimalaweera	D. R. Nanayakkara, N. R. Dias, Eddie Junior, B. N. Amaralatha, J. C. K. Rupawathie, K. W. Karuna Kumari, K. Hector Soysa	Drama	Released on 9 March.
Sengawunu Pilithura	B. A. W. Jayamanne	Rukmani Devi, Eddie Jayamanne, Stanley Mallawarachchi, Mabel Blythe, S. D. Elizabeth, B. A. W. Jayamanne, Leticia Peiris, Bertram Fernando	Drama	Released on 20 May 20. Tamil-dubbed version was released in December 1951 as Kusumalatha at Gamini (Maradana), Wembley (Kandy). The first Sinhala film to be dubbed in Tamil.

== 1952 ==
Title	Director	Cast	Genre	Notes
1952
Banda Nagarayata Pemineema	Raja Wahab Kashmeer; A. B. Raj	Bernard Perera, Nanda Leelanayaka, Joseph Seneviratne, Malini Ranasinghe, Hugo Fernando, Berty Gunathilake, Chandanie Seneviratne	Drama	Released on 4 May. First movie produced entirely in Sri Lanka.
Umathu Vishvasaya	B. A. W. Jayamanne	Rukmani Devi, Eddie Jayamanne, Herbert M. Seneviratne, Sumith Bibile, Mabel Blythe, Leticia Peiris, Ruby de Mel	Drama	Released on 9 May.
Siri Sangabo	Vernon Jayawardena	Theresa Weerasinghe, Lakshmi Bhai, Edward Perera, Piyadasa Perera, Piyadasa Gunasekera	Religious	Released on 18 July. First movie to depict a Buddhist theme.

== 1953 ==
Title	Director	Cast	Genre	Notes
1953
Eda Rae	Shanthi Kumar	Thilakasiri Fernando, Seetha Jayawardena, Shanthi Kumar, Herbie Seneviratne, Austin Abeysekera, Michael Sannasliyanage, Premnath Moraes	Drama	Released on 14 February. Debut playback singing for Latha Walpola.
Prema Tharangaya	S. M. Nayagam	Aruna Shanthi, Ayesha Weerakoon, Laddie Ranasinghe, Mark Samaranayake, Hugo Fernando, Richard Albert, Dharma Sri Ranatunga	Romance	Released on 27 March. Debut playback singing for Dharmadasa Walpola.
Pitisara Kella	Sirisena Wimalaweera	Theresa Weerasinghe, A. Shanthapriya, Malini Ranasinghe, L. M. Fernando, E. Marshall Perera, S. D. Elizabeth, S. H. Jothipala, Ayesha Weerakoon, Hugo Fernando	Drama	Released on 24 April.
Kele Handa	B. A. W. Jayamanne	Rukmani Devi, Stanley Perera, Rita Ratnayake, B. A. W. Jayamanne, Eddie Jayamanne, Mabel Blythe, Millie Kahandawala, Wimala Kumari, Udula Dabare	Musical	Released on 27 May. First movie based on a Sinhala novel.
Sujatha	T. R. Sundaram	Florida Jayalath, Prem Jayanth, David Dharmakeerthi, Dommie Jayawardena, Shanthi Lekha, Gemini Kantha, Bertram Fernando	Drama	Released on 26 June. Based on Bollywood film Bari Behen.
Puduma Leli	A.S. Nagarajan	Prem Jayanth, Clarice de Silva, Hugo Fernando, Nanda Leelanayake, Dharma Sri Ranatunga, Mark Samaranayake, Girley Gunawardana, Richard Albert	Drama	Released on 4 December.

== 1954 ==
Title	Director	Cast	Genre	Notes
1954
Warada Kageda?	T. R. Sundaram; D. V. Chari	Prem Jayanth, Rita Ratnayake, Laddie Ranasinghe, Shanthi Lekha, Dommie Jayawardena, Udula Dabare, Christy Leonard Perera	Drama	Released on 9 April. Karunaratne Abeysekera made his film debut as a lyricist.
Iranganie	B. A. W. Jayamanne	Rukmani Devi, B. A. W. Jayamanne, Stanley Perera, Herbert M. Seneviratne, Herbie Seneviratne, Mabel Blythe, Eddie Jayamanne, Lilian Edirisinghe	Drama	Released on 10 April.
Saradiel	Sirisena Wimalaweera	Mathias Fernando, Theresa Weerasinghe, N. R. Dias, Girley Gunawardana, Devika Rani, S. H. Jothipala, Sebastian Jayasinghe, B. P. Wickremasinghe	Biographical	Released on 5 August.
Ahankara Sthree	A. Bhaskar Raj	Clarice De Silva, Ravindra Rupasena, Ratna Kumari, Hugo Fernando, Rohini Jayakody, Mark Samaranayake, Eddie Yapa, Leena de Silva	Thriller	Released on 17 September.
Radala Piliruwa	T. R. Sundaram	Laddie Ranasinghe, Rita Ratnayake, Dommie Jayawardena, Herbie Seneviratne, Millie Kahandawela, Shanthi Lekha, Udula Dabare	Drama	Released on 24 December. Based on W. A. Silva's novel of the same name.

== 1955 ==
Title	Director	Cast	Genre	Notes
1955
Surangani	Cyril P. Abeyratne	Eddie Junior, D. R. Nanayakkara, Pearl Vasudevi, Kanthi Gunatunga, Lilian Edirisinghe, Disna Ranjani, G. S. B. Rani	Drama	Released on 19 February.
Asoka	Sirisena Wimalaweera	Sumith Bibile, Pushpa Janet, Ananda Weerakoon, Eddie Yapa, Punya Heendeniya, Benjamin Fernando, Vimala Kumari, S. H. Jothipala	Romance	Released on 4 March.
Mathabhedaya	B. A. W. Jayamanne	Rukmani Devi, B. A. W. Jayamanne, Eddie Jayamanne, Mark Samaranayake, Senadheera Kuruppu, Peter Peiris, Mabel Blythe, Ruby de Mel	Thriller	Released on 14 April.
Seda Sulang	T. Somasekaran	Prem Jayanth, Florida Jayalath, David Dharmakeerthi, Piyadasa Gunasekera, Dharmasri Ranatunga, Lilian Edirisinghe, Dommie Jayawardena	Drama	Released on 24 June.
Mathalan	A. S. Nagarajan	Clarice de Silva, Shesha Palihakkara, Hugo Fernando, Mark Samaranayake, Peter Perera, Eddie Yapa, Bernard Perera, Pitipana Silva	Drama	Released on 27 August.
Perakadoru Bena	A. Bhaskar Raj	Rukmani Devi, Eddie Jayamanne, Mark Samaranayake, Ruby de Mel, Mabel Blythe, Kingsley Rajapakse, Baptist Fernando	Comedy	Released on 14 October.
Podi Putha	Sirisena Wimalaweera	Sirisena Wimalaweera, Ananda Weerakoon, Pushpa Janet, N. R. Dias, Malani Ranasinghe, S. H. Jothipala, Eddie Junior	Drama	Released on 25 November.

== 1956 ==
Title	Director	Cast	Genre	Notes
1956
Dosthara	K. Shankar	Rukmani Devi, Eddie Jayamanne, Herbert M. Seneviratne, Hugo Fernando, Mark Samaranayake, Shanthi Lekha, Sirimathi Rasadari	Drama	Released on 2 February.
Dingiri Menika	A. S. A. Sami	Cyrus W. Surendra, Theja Seneviratne, Vimala Venetia, Bandula Sri Sarachchandra, Seetha Nanayakkara, Luman Rajapakse, Joseph Seneviratne	Drama	Released on 11 May.
Daiva Vipakaya	B. A. W. Jayamanne	B. A. W. Jayamanne, Senadheera Kuruppu, Dharma Sri Ranatunga, Mabel Blythe, Ruby de Mel, Shirley Blythe, Grace Jayamanne, Dudley Wanaguru	Drama	Released on 23 May.
Duppathage Duka	T. R. Sundaram; K. Mithradas	Laddie Ranasinghe, Hugo Fernando, Mark Samaranayake, Stanley Perera, Girley Gunawardana, Dommie Jayawardena, Kanthi Gunatunga	Drama	Released on 10 August.
Surathali	Cyril P. Abeyratne	Ravindra Rupasena, Leena de Silva, Ananda Jayaratne, Rohini Jayakody, L. M. Perera, Premila Kuruppu, Lilian Edirisinghe, Sirimathi Rasadari	Romance	Released on 12 September. First Sinhala film to be released through Ceylon Entertainments circuit. H. R. Jothipala made his film debut as a playback singer.
Ramyalatha	A. Bhaskar Raj	Aruna Shanthi, Clarice de Silva, Rita Ratnayake, Pujitha Mendis, Mark Samaranayake, Pitipana Silva, Boniface Fernando, Eddie Yapa	Drama	Released on 25 November.
Rekava	Lester James Peries	Ananda Weerakoon, Mallika Pilapitiya, D. R. Nanayakkara, Iranganie Serasinghe, Somapala Dharmapriya, Myrtle Fernando, Nona Zubeida	Musical	Released on 28 December. First Sinhala film photographed entirely "on location".
Sirakaruwa	Sirisena Wimalaweera	Sirisena Wimalaweera, Mathias Fernando, Marshal Perera, S. H. Jothipala, Upasena Wimalaweera, Shanthi Abeysekera, N. R. Dias, Piyadasa Wijekoon	Thriller	Released on 25 January.

== 1957 ==
Title	Director	Cast	Genre	Notes
1957
Jeevitha Satana	Shanthi Kumar	Shanthi Kumar, Seetha Jayawardena, Herbie Seneviratne, Ayesha Weerakoon, Ananda Weerakoon, Shane Gunaratne, Millie Kahandawala, Shanthi Lekha	Drama	Released on 23 February. Based on Tamil film En Veedu (1953) & Hindi film Gumastha (1953).
Suraya	T. R. Sundaram	Laddie Ranasinghe, Herbie Seneviratne, Alfred Edirimanne, Rohini Jayakody, Kanthi Gunatinga, Hugo Fernando, S. D. Elizabeth	Action	Released on 29 March. Story based on Tamil film Thiruttu Raman (1956).
Siriyalatha	S. S. Rajan	Rukmani Devi, Herbert M. Seneviratne, Eddie Jayamanne, Mark Samaranayake, Ruby de Mel, Hugo Fernando, Leticia Peiris	Drama	Released on 27 June.
Le Kandulu	K. Wellington Silva	Ratna Kumari, Nanda Kumar, Arthur Titus, Shantha Wijesuriya, Noman Hettiarachchi, Oril Wanakulasuriya, Malani Fernando, Real Dewi	Drama	Released on 2 September.
Sukumali	M. K. Samy; M. Masthan	Laddie Ranasinghe, Ayesha Weerakoon, Rita Ratnayake, Ananda Weerakoon, Christy Leonard Perera, Sudas Maskorala	Drama	Released on 14 October.
Saradam	T. Somasekaran	Florida Jayalath, Stanley Perera, Joe Abeywickrama, Kingsley Rajapakse, Richard Albert, Sunil Premadasa	Drama	Released on 29 November. Film debut for Joe Abeywickrama.
Surasena	S. M. S. Naidu	Herbie Seneviratne, Kanthi Gunatunga, Rohini Jayakody, Eddie Jayamanne, Mark Samaranayake, Ruby de Mel, Dommie Jayawardena	Action	Released on 13 December.

== 1958 ==
Title	Director	Cast	Genre	Notes
1958
Ekamath Eka Rataka	Sirisena Wimalaweera	Turin Fernando, Rita Doreen, Nanda Hettiarachchi, S. H. Jothipala, N. R. Dias, Malini Ranasinghe, Lilian Edirisinghe, Daya Karunaratne	Drama	Released on 14 February.
Vanaliya	B. A. W. Jayamanne	B. A. W. Jayamanne, Shirley Blythe, Dharmasri Ranatunga, Patricia Walker, Sumithra Walker, Mabel Blythe, Grace Jayamanne, Austin Abeysekera	Drama	Released on 21 February. Based on Tamil film Minnalkodi.
Sohoyuro	A. Bhaskar Raj; L. S. Ramachandran	Clarice de Silva, Aruna Shanthi, Ravindra Rupasena, Leena de Silva, Ananda Jayaratne, Pitipana Silva, Eddie Yapa, Joseph Seneviratne	Drama	Released on 15 March. Angeline Gunathilake made his first film as a playback singer.
Deiyanne Rate	L. S. Ramachandran	Senadheera Kuruppu, Punya Heendeniya, Dommie Jayawardena, Piyadasa Gunasekera, Rohini Jayakody, Jennie Winifrida, Alfred Edirimanne	Drama	Released on 1 May. Based on the novel by W. A. Silva.
Salli Malli Salli	M. R. S. Mani	Prem Jayanth, David Dharmakeerthi, Shanthi Lekha, Rosalind Fernando, Manel Samaranayake, Daya Abeysekera	Thriller	Released on 18 July.
Daskama	Jyotish Sinha	Ravindra Rupasena, Disna Ranjani, Dudley Wanaguru, Bertram Fernando, Millie Kahandawala, Shanthi Abeysekera	Action	Released on 25 July.
Suneetha	P. Neelakantan	Ravindra Rupasena, Rita Ratnayake, Kingsley Rajapakse, Leena de Silva, Christy Leonard Perera, Punya Heendeniya, L. M. Perera	Romance	Released on 21 August.
Sepali	W. M. S. Tampoe	Stanley Perera, Florida Jayalath, Mark Samaranayake, Rita Ratnayake, Anthony C. Perera, Christy Leonard Perera, Vincent Vaas	Drama	Released on 10 October. Story based on Hindi film Dulari (1949).
Vana Mohini	A. Bhaskar Raj; T. R. Sundaram	Herbie Seneviratne, Kanthi Gunatunga, Rohini Jayakody, Piyadasa Gunasekera, Hugo Fernando, David Dharmakeerthi, Richard Albert, Vincent Vaas	Drama	Released on 12 December. Story based on Tamil film Vana Mohini (1941).

== 1959 ==
Title	Director	Cast	Genre	Notes
1959
Avishvasaya	T. Somasekaran	Prem Jayanth, Florida Jayalath, Joe Abeywickrema, Baptist Fernando, M. V. Balan, Kingsley Rajapakse, Sudam Wanigatunga	Thriller	Released on 4 February.
Ma Alaya Kala Tharuniya	Sirisena Wimalaweera	Aruna Shanthi, Ananda Weerakoon, Kumari Manel, Bandu Munasinghe, N. R. Dias, S. H. Jothipala, E. Marshall Perera, Piyadasa Wijekoon	Drama	Released on 20 February.
Daivayogaya	S. K. Ojha	Rukmani Devi, Senadheera Kuruppu, Eddie Jayamanne, Gamini Fonseka, Mark Samaranayake, Sirimathi Rasadari	Drama	Released on 18 April. Story based on novel by W. A. Silva.
Purusha Rathnaya	A.S. Nagarajan	Prem Jayanth, Clarice de Silva, Millie Kahandawala, Baptist Fernando, Eddie Yapa, Pitipana Silva, Piyadasa Wijekoon	Drama	Released on 9 May. Swarna Abeynayake became the first woman to produce a Sinhala film.
Sri 296	Premnath Moraes	Punya Heendeniya, Joe Abeywickrema, Henry Jayasena, Sudam Wanigatunga, Kingsley Rajapakse, Sirimathi Rasadari, M. V. Balan	Thriller	Released on 20 May. Story based on Hindi film C. I.D. (1956).
Sihinaya	T. Janaki Ram	Dommie Jayawardena, Rohini Jayakody, Senadheera Kuruppu, Asoka Ponnamperuma, Lilian Edirisinghe, Ayesha Weerakoon, D. R. Nanayakkara	Crime	Released on 3 July. Story based on English film Vendetta (1950?).
Gehenu Geta	Jyotish Sinha; Kingsley Rajapakse; T. Somasekaran	Henry Jayasena, Kumari Bibile, Dudley Wanaguru, Udula Dabare, Florida Jayalath, Vincent Weerasekera, Joe Abeywickrema	Musical comedy	Released on 24 July. Story based on English film The Fabulous Senorita (1952), Hindi film Albela (1951) and Tamil film Manamagan Thevai (1957).
Sirimalee	Robin Tampoe	Boniface Fernando, Sujatha Wijesekera, Asoka Ponnamperuma, Joe Abeywickrema, David Dharmakeerthi, Rita Carmaline, Christy Leonard Perera	Romance	Released on 11 September.
Hadisi Vivahaya	B. A. W. Jayamanne	B. A. W. Jayamanne, Shirley Blythe, Dharmasri Ranatunga, Ruby de Mel, Dudley Wanaguru, Mabel Blythe, Austin Abeysekera, Patricia Walker	Drama	Released on 14 November.

== See also ==
- Cinema of Sri Lanka
- List of Sri Lankan films
