= List of Sri Lankan films of the 1940s =

Films produced in Sri Lanka in the 1940s.

== 1947 ==
Title	Director	Cast	Genre	Notes
1947
Kadawunu Poronduwa	Jyotish Sinha	Rukmani Devi, B. A. W. Jayamanne, Peter Peiris, Miriam Jayamanne, Hugo Fernando, Stanley Mallawarachchi, Eddie Jayamanne, Jemini Kantha	Drama	Screened on 21 January. First Sri Lankan Movie to be made in Sinhala language.
Asokamala	T. R. Gopu; Shanthi Kumar	Shanthi Kumar, Emalin Dibulana, Michael Sannasliyanage, Herbie Seneviratne, Don Edward, Austin Abeysekera, Michael Rodrigo	Drama	Released on 10 April.

== 1948 ==
Title	Director	Cast	Genre	Notes
1948
Kapati Arakshakaya	Jyotish Sinha; K. Subramaniam	Christy De Mel, Rukmani Devi, Eddie Jayamanne, Bertram Fernando, Herbie Seneviratne, B. A. W. Jayamanne, Jemini Kantha	Thriller	Released on 23 February.
Divya Premaya	N. P. Javeri	Luman Rajapaksha, Srimathi Karunadevi, Robert Perera, Simon Silva, Peter Siriwardene	Romance	Released on 22 May.
Veradunu Kurumanama	Jyotish Sinha	B. A. W. Jayamanne, Rukmani Devi, Lalitha Kumari, Jemini Kantha, Herbie Seneviratne, Eddie Jayamanne, Bertram Fernando, B. S. Perera	Thriller	Released on 3 December.

== 1949 ==
Title	Director	Cast	Genre	Notes
1949
Amma	Sirisena Wimalaweera	D.R. Nanayakkara, Pearl Vasudevi, Eddie Junior, N. R. Dias, S. H. Jothipala	Drama	Released on 19 August.
Peralena Iranama	Jyotish Sinha	Eddie Jayamanne, Rukmani Devi, Aruna Shanthi, Mark Samaranayake, Mabel Blythe	Drama	Released on 20 October.

== See also ==
- Cinema of Sri Lanka
- List of Sri Lankan films
