= S. M. Nayagam =

Sundaram Mathura-Nayagam (24 September 1906 - 03 February 1972) was a pioneer of Sinhala cinema, producing the first ever Sinhala talkie, Kadawunu Poronduwa.

== Career ==
Hailing from Madurai, South India, Nayagam was originally an industrialist, making soaps and perfumes at factories both in Madurai and Ceylon. With the flourishing of Indian cinema in the 1940s, he established his own cinema company, Sri Murugan Navakala Limited, named after the Hindu deity Murugan. The company was based in Madurai, owning a studio (Chitrakala Movietone) at Thiruparankundram.

Nayagam's first venture into film was the 1946 Tamil language film Kumaraguru, directed by Bengali director Jothish Sinha. His second film, a patriotic film entitled Thaai Nadu, was also in Tamil, being released on the day of India's independence.

=== Kadawunu Poronduwa ===
According to Nayagam, his Sinhala friends enjoyed Hindi and Tamil films but were disappointed that they did not have films in their own language. Nayagam was thus inspired to produce a film in the Sinhala language. After considering several storylines, he settled on a popular Sinhala stage play, going on to produce Kadawunu Poronduwa. The film was shot at his own studio, with all technicians from India but the cast brought from the island country for this purpose. The film's debut in Ceylon was attended by the head of the ministerial cabinet, D. S. Senanayake; nevertheless, the film received mixed reactions in the country. While the average filmgoer was happy to watch a film that in their own language, critics said the film was overtly “Indian” in content and form.

== Filmography ==
| Title | Year | Language | Director | Main cast |
|---|---|---|---|---|
| Kumaraguru | 1946 | Tamil | Jothish Sinha | Krishna Iyer, Vithvan Mani, Tanjore Mani, Jeyabala, Radha |
| Thaai Nadu | 1947 | Tamil | T.S. Mani | Battling Mani, S.T. Williams, V.P.S. Mani, T.K. Krishnaiah, M.R. Sundari, N.C. Meera |
| Kadawunu Poronduwa | 1947 | Sinhala | Jothish Sinha | Rukmani Devi, B. A. W. Jayamanne, Peter Peiris, Miriam Jayamanne, Hugo Fernando, Stanley Mallawarachchi, Eddie Jayamanne, Gemini Kantha, Timothius Perera, J B Perera, Rupa Devi |
| Prema Tharangaya | 1953 | Sinhala | A. Bhaskar Raj | Aruna Shanthi, Ayesha Weerakoon, Laddie Ranasinghe, Mark Samaranayake, Hugo Fernando |
| Puduma Leli | 1953 | Sinhala | A.S. Nagarajan | Prem Jayanth, Clarice de Silva, Hugo Fernando, Dharmasri Ranatunga, Mark Samaranayake, Girley Gunawardana |
| Ahankara Sthree | 1954 | Sinhala | A. Bhaskar Raj | Clarice De Silva, Ravindra Rupasena, Ratna Kumari, Hugo Fernando, Rohini Jayakody, Mark Samaranayake, Eddie Yapa, Leena de Silva |
| Mathalan | 1955 | Sinhala | A.S. Nagarajan | Clarice De Silva, Shesha Palihakkara, Hugo Fernando, Mark Samaranayake, Peter Perera, Eddie Yapa, Bernard Perera, Pitipana Silva |
| Ramyalatha | 1956 | Sinhala | A. Bhaskar Raj | Aruna Shanthi, Clarice De Silva, Rita Ratnayake, Pujitha Mendis, Mark Samaranayake, Pitipana Silva, Boniface Fernando, Eddie Yapa, W. Benedict Fernando |
| Sohoyuro | 1958 | Sinhala | L.S. Ramachandran | Clarice De Silva, Aruna Shanthi, Ravindra Rupasena, Leena de Silva, Ananda Jayaratne, Pitipana Silva, Eddie Yapa, Joseph Seneviratne, Pujitha Mendis, Millie Kahandawala, Vijitha Mallika, Richard Albert, Boniface Fernando |
| Nalangana | 1960 | Sinhala | L.S. Ramachandran | Rukmani Devi, Ravindra Rupasena, Leena de Silva, Alfred Edirimanne, Eddie Jayamanne, Joe Abeywickrema, Ruby de Mel, Udula Dabare, Pitipana Silva, Sirimathi Rasadari, Richard Albert, H D Kulatunga, Vijitha Mallika, Dudley Wanaguru |
