= Bertram Fernando =

Sri Lankan actor

Bertram Fernando බර්ට්‍රම් ප්‍රනාන්දු
- Born: Emanuel Anthony Bertram Fernando; 10 April 1921; Negambo, Sri Lanka
- Died: 15 November 1986 (aged 65); Colombo
- Education: Maris Stella College
- Occupations: Actor, comedian, producer
- Years active: 1940–1971

Emanuel Anthony Bertram Fernando (10 April 1921 – 15 November 1986) (Sinhala: බර්ට්‍රම් ප්‍රනාන්දු), popularly known as Bertram Fernando, was an actor in Sri Lankan cinema and stage drama.

== Personal life ==
Fernando was born on 10 April 1921 in Dawatagahawatte, Negombo. He was educated at Maris Stella College, Negombo. He worked as a store keeper in the marketing department after he quit cinema.

He died on 15 November 1986 at the age of 65.

== Career ==
He joined Minerva Drama Company in Negombo under the guidance of B. A. W. Jayamanne. He first acted in stage play Avataraya in 1940 as an 18-year-old boy. Fernando made his cinema debut in the 1947 film Kadawunu Poronduwa, Sri Lanka's first film to be made in Sinhalese. He played the role "Mohommad" in that film. Popular actor Eddie Jayamanne has helped him to rise from the very beginning as a comic actor. He also played a caricature role "Junda" in the 1948 film Kapati Arakshakaya. In the film, he also debuted as a background singer by singing the song Udaya Nagita Muwa Soda. In the same year, Fernando played the role of "Pinto" in the film Weradunu Kurumanama.

He played a comic character "Peethara" in the 1949 film Peralena Iranama, which made his mark in the cinema. In the film he sang the song "Man Bandina Wayasa", which is one of the most popular song in gramophone era. In 1950, he acted in the film Hadisi Vinischaya as "Pinthu" and then Fernando acted in the 1951 film Sengawunu Pilithura in which he sang a song for the first time with the role of "Minister Aluneris". His song "Manthreekama Dinanawa" lyrics by C. Weerasekera and music by Mohammed Gauss was very popular. In 1952 film Umathu Wishwasaya he played the role "Abaran" along with his closer friend Eddie and performed and played a background duet song "Pissuwa".

From 1947 to 1953, Fernando starred in B. A. W. Jayamanne's films. In 1953, Fernando joined the Cinemas company to act in the film Sujatha with the role "Perera Unnehe". He was critically acclaimed for the role "Kavan Piyasena" in the 1954 film Radala Piliruwa.

He entered the cinema as a film producer with the 1958 film Daskama. The film was widely acknowledged by the critics for background music, dialogues and direction. All songs are autonomous made by Edwin Samaradivakara included eight songs where seven songs became popular. The film was Samaradivakara's one and only music direction. The last film that Fernando acted in was Roland Amarasinghe's 1971 film Kesara Sinhayo.

== Filmography ==
=== As actor ===
Year	Film	Role	Ref.
1950	Hadisi Vinischaya	Pinthu	
1951	Segawunu Pilithura	Minister Aluneris	
1952	Umathu Wishwasaya	Abaran	
1947	Kadawunu Poronduwa	Mohammad	
1948	Kapati Arakshakaya	Junda	
1948	Weradunu Kurumanama		
1949	Peralena Iranama	Peethara	
1953	Sujatha	Perera Unnehe	
1954	Warada Kageda		
1954	Radala Piliruwa	Kavan Piyasena	
1958	Daskama		
1968	Mathru Bhoomi		
1968	Indunila		
1971	Kesara Sinhayo	Thepanis	
