= Mabel Blythe =

Sri Lankan film actress (1930–2004)

Mabel Blythe මේබල් බ්ලයිත්
- Born: Mabel Josephine Blythe; March 28, 1930; Kandy, Sri Lanka
- Died: 27 December 2004 (aged 74); Nuwara Eliya
- Resting place: Hawaeliya Cemetery
- Education: Good Shepherd Convent, Nuwara Eliya; Good Shepherd's Convent
- Occupations: Actress, Singer
- Years active: 1947-1983
- Known for: Cinema acting
- Spouse: Ranjith Anthony
- Relatives: Shirley Blythe (sister); Princey Blythe (sister)

Mabel Josephine Blythe (28 March 1930–27 December 2004: මේබල් බ්ලයිත්) was an actress and singer in Sri Lankan cinema. One of the earliest pillars of Sinhala cinema, she acted in several popular films as well as worked as a playback singer.

== Personal life ==
Blythe was born on 28 March 1930 in Nuwara Eliya, Sri Lanka as the second child of the family. Her father John Blythe was a Burgher physician. Her mother was from upcountry with the initials 'Kumarihamy'. The couple got married amid protests on both sides. She was educated at the Good Shepherd Convent in Nuwara Eliya and the Good Shepherd's Convent in Kandy in English medium. At the age of sixteen, she took Senior Certificate. She has two sisters and two brothers.

Her sister Shirley Blythe is also a popular film actress who acted in the early Sinhala films: Hadisi Vinischaya, Segawunu Pilithura, Kusumalatha, Umathu Wishwasaya, Hadisi Vivahaya and Vanaliya. Her younger sister Princey Blythe also acted in the films Umathu Wishwasaya, Iranganie and Daiva Vipakaya.

Blythe married Ranjith Anthony and settled in Nuwara Eliya, subsequently relying on a Tower Hall pension. On 24 December 2004 she suffered a heart attack and was suddenly hospitalized. She died the day after Sri Lanka suffered the Tsunami tragedy, on 27 December 2004 at the age of 74. She was later buried in Hawaeliya.

== Career ==
Even though she had an interest in becoming an actress, her mother stood against her for acting. Her father also insisted that Mabel be a doctor like him. One day Mabel went with her sister Shirley to meet Gemini Kantha's uncle without telling her parents. He then sent Mabel's photos to B. A. W. Jayamanne via Jemini Kantha. Later, Jayamanne sent a letter to Mabel in Nuwara Eliya asking her to come for an interview. Unfortunately, her mother hid the letter from her. Then Mabel went to see Gemini's uncle again and found out the date and time she had been asked to come for the interview. Somehow her mother became suspicious and locked her in a room and tied her hands to a window sill.

Her mother put all her clothes in a trunk and sent them to a neighbour house. Finally, out of grief, her father released Mabel from home and took her to Negombo for the interview. Two weeks later, she received a letter saying that she had been selected for the film 'Hadisi Vinischaya'. In 1954, she made her maiden cinema appearance through the film Hadisi Vinishchaya opposite Eddie Jayamanne. In the film, she also got the opportunity to have the background vocals for the song "Mage Mawuni" under the music director B. S. Perera, composed by Marcelino Albert. After the successful debut, she then appeared in the 1951 film Sengawunu Pilithura to play the role of 'Nancy'. Then in the film Umathu Wishwasaya in 1952, she played the role 'Lizzy'.

In 1953, she made the popular role 'Missy' in the film Kele Handa opposite to Eddie. The background vocals for the songs: ""Mama Manamali Obe"" and "Ho Manamalaya". Like the movie, their songs were extremely popular. She subsequently had similar roles in Iranganie (1954), Matha Bedhaya (1955), Perakadoru Bena (1955), Daiwa Wipaakaya (1956), Vanaliya (1958; with her sister Shirly Blythe), Kawata Andare (1960) and Mangalika (1963).

Blythe sang in her movies. Her song "Sara Goiya" done for Daiwa Wipaakaya is considered one of the longest songs in Sri Lankan cinema running in at eight minutes. Blythe dueted with Mohideen Baig on "Surathaliye Sukumaliye" for the same film. She also starred in several stage plays such as Mal Yahanawa, Sasara Duka and Seethala Nadiya.

Blythe's later movies include Senasuma Kothanada (1966), Geetha (1970), Sujeewa (1972), Sukiri Kella (1975) and Mangala (1976). She also appeared in two South Indian films, Walliyin Selvan (with MG Ramachandran) and Periya Ediththa Pen (alongside Chandrababu). Blythe retired from film after filling in the role originally done by Jemini Kantha in the remake of Kadawunu Poronduwa (1982) pairing with Eddie Jayamanne one last time.

She was presented the Sarasaviya Rantisara Award in 2002.

== Filmography ==
Year	Film	Role	Ref.
1950	Hadisi Vinischaya	Srimathi	
1951	Sengawunu Pilithura	Nancina	
1952	Umathu Wishvasaya	Lizzy	
1953	Kele Handa	Missy	
1954	Iranganie	Margret	
1955	Mathabhedaya	Millie	
1956	Daiva Vipakaya	Shiromala	
1958	Wanaliya		
1959	Hadisi Vivahaya	Anta	
1970	Geetha	Mabel	
1976	Hariyata Hari	Leticia	
1982	Kadawunu Poronduwa remake	Josie	
1949	Peralena Iranama		
1955	Perakadoru Bena		
1961	Jeewitha Poojawa		
1963	Mangalika		
1964	Kala Kala De Pala Pala De		
1964	Sujage Rahasa		
1966	Senasuma Kothanada		
1967	Pipena Kumudu		
1967	Magul Poruwa		
1967	Sarana		
1972	Sujeewa	Sujeewa's mother	
1975	Sookiri Kella	Dayawathie	
1985	Raththaran Kanda		
1991	Cheriyo Doctor	Mrs. Saparamadu	
1992	Jaya Sri We Kumariye		
1993	Jeewan Malli		
2003	Sepata Dukata Sunny	Mala's mother	
