= Divya Premaya =

1948 film

Peralena Iranama දිව්‍ය ප්‍රේමය
- Directed by: N.V. Javeri, D.S. Babu
- Produced by: N. Thuraisingham
- Starring: Luman Rajapakse; Srimathi Karunadevi; Eddie Jayamanne; Gemini Kantha
- Release date: 22 May 1948
- Country: Sri Lanka
- Language: Sinhala

Divya Premaya also known as Divyamaya Premaya (Sinhala: දිව්‍ය ප්‍රේමය) (transl. Divine love) is a 1948 Sri Lankan Sinhala language drama film which was directed by D.S. Babu and N.V. Javeri. Luman Rajapakse and Srimathi Karunadevi acted in the lead roles for the first time through this film. This film was only the 4th Sinhala movie in the Cinema of Sri Lanka and the first movie with scenes in Sri Lanka. This was only one of 3 Sinhala language films to be released in 1948. The film was released through the Ginthupitiya Talkies on 22 May 1948, the year Sri Lanka got independence from the British Empire.

== Cast ==
- Luman Rajapakse
- Srimathi Karunadev
- Robert Perera
- Simon Silva
- Peter Siriwardene
