= Prema Tharangaya =

1953 Sinhalese film by A. B. Rajj

Prema Tharangaya ප්‍රේම තරඟය
- Directed by: A. B. Rajj
- Screenplay by: Hugo Fernando
- Produced by: S. M. Nayagam
- Starring: Aruna Shanthi; Ayesha Weerakoon; Hugo Fernando; Mark Samaranayake; Laddie Ranasinghe
- Music by: R. Muttusamy
- Distributed by: Studio Sundara Sound, Kandana
- Release date: 27 March 1953 (Sri Lanka)
- Country: Sri Lanka
- Language: Sinhala

Prema Tharangaya (Sinhala, Love Contest) is a 1953 Sri Lankan film directed by A. B. Rajj and produced by S. M. Nayagam. The film stars Aruna Shanthi and Ayesha Weerakoon in lead roles along with Hugo Fernando, Mark Samaranayake and Laddie Ranasinghe in supportive roles. Music was directed by R. Muttusamy. The musician Dharmadasa Walpola debuted as a playback singer in this film.

== Plot ==
Love story of Premadasa and Mallika.

== Cast ==
- Aruna Shanthi as Premadasa
- Ayesha Weerakoon as Mallika
- Hugo Fernando as Walpola Mudalali
- Mark Samaranayake as Wickrama
- Laddie Ranasinghe as Gunasiri
- Richard Albert as Tarzan
- Dharma Sri Ranatunga
- Latha Walpola
- Girley Gunawardana as Dancer
- Benedict Fernando as Teacher
- David Dharmakeerthi
- Nancy Dias as Piyasili
- Jemini Kantha as Podihamy
- Devika Rani as Mariyan

== Songs ==
- "Sama Malin Ron Soyan" – Latha Walpola and chorus
- Hitha Sanasene" – Rudrani
- "Pasal Jeevithe"
- "Dahasa Diley"
- "Pera Kala Pawa Pala Di" – Dharmadasa Walpola
- "Ho Hada Di" – Latha Walpola
- "Darunu Gini Dalewi" – Latha Walpola
- "Ugathu Wiyathu" – Latha Walpola
- "Sapatha Siwarage" – Dharmadasa and Latha Walpola
- "Hoda Hodama Weya Lowa" – Dharmadasa and Latha Walpola
- "Mey Loke Wasi" – Haroon Lanthra
- "Wali Wadeney Wena Giye" – Hugo Fernando and Rudrani
