= Herbert M. Seneviratne =

Sri Lankan actor, lyricist and filmmaker

Herbert M. Seneviratne හර්බට් එම්. සෙනෙවිරත්න
- Born: Kappina Degiri Herbert Mendis Seneviratne; 25 July 1925; Galle, Sri Lanka
- Died: 7 June 1987 (aged 61); Kotte, Colombo
- Education: Siddhartha Central College Balapitiya; Mahabodhi College
- Occupations: Film actor, songwriter, producer, director, scriptwriter
- Years active: 1945–1985

Kappithadegiri Herbert Mendis Seneviratne (25 July 1925 – 7 June 1987 as Sinhala: හර්බට් එම්. සෙනෙවිරත්න), popularly known as Herbert M. Seneviratne, was a lyricist and actor in Sri Lankan cinema as well as a producer and a screenwriter.

== Personal life ==
Herbert was born on 25 July 1925 in Kahawa, Galle, Sri Lanka. He was educated at Siddhartha Central College Balapitiya. His childhood was not pleasant as his older brother was constantly hostile to Herbert. One day, he ran away from home and grew up in the shadow of his aunt, Emily Gunathilake. When he went to Siddhartha Vidyalaya, Balapitiya, he took the lead in cricket tournaments and later received a scholarship to study at the Siddhartha English School for free. After that Herbert, who grew up in aunt's home in Colombo and entered Mahabodhi College, Colombo.

During his studies in Mahabodhi Vidyalaya at the age of eight, he played the character 'Peiris Mudalali' in the play Yantham Beruna. Meanwhile, he passed the Sinhala-English Senior Examination.

He was married to Swarna Lakshmi and the couple had one son: Chinthana.

He died on 7 June 1987 in Kotte at the age of 61.

== Career ==
While studying at Mahabodhi, Herbert came across an art-loving friend, Marcus Perera, who was the brother of popular songstress Chitra Perera née Somapala. He started writing songs for Chitra along the way. His first song wrote was Lalitha Kala Opa Karana which was sung by Chithra and P. L. A. Somapala. During this period, he was writing songs for gramophone records and later met Eddie Jayamanne. Through Eddie, Herbert got the opportunity to meet popular playwright and director B. A. W. Jayamanne. In 1951, he went to Citadel Studio in South India and composed 10 songs for Jayamanne's film Umathu Vishwasaya which includes several popular hits such as "Siriyawi Mage", "Sthrira Aale", "Mage Prema Raja", "Kolompure Shriya" and "Mama Manamali Obe".

He also got the opportunity to play a minor role of 'Piyasena', Rukmani Devi's boyfriend in the film Umathu Vishwasaya. Beginning in 1951, he starred in for 20 years of his limited film career. During this time, he met Upali Wanasinghe who formed a drama society called 'Kala Mandiraya' and produced a play called 'Daskon'. In that play, Herbert acted as 'King Narendrasinghe'. Herbert then wrote a number of songs to Rukmani Devi for gramophone records and commercials which included popular hits "Dushmantha Aho Kimado", "Soka Dahara", "Aida Giye Mawa Thanikara" and "Pem Sihina Mawana".

Among the movie songs he wrote, all the songs he wrote for the film Kele Handa were extremely popular such as "Mawila Penivi", "Anna Sudo Ara Patawala", "Ko Sepatha Me Sansare". He later co-starred with Rukmani Devi in the films Dosthara (1956), Siriyalatha (1957) and Daskon (1962). In 1965, he made dual roles: Charlie and Sena Galpatha in the blockbuster film Handapana directed by W. A. Silva. In the film, he also composed several popular songs: "Aloke Pathura", "Piduru Sevikala Pelpathe", "Oba Nathi Me Bima" and "Aetha Ahase Nega" as well as produced the film.

In 1955 film Dosthara, he wrote the songs Ho Pem Rajaya, Pem Sagare Gilila, Vasanawantha Kala Laba, Jeevithe Ma Palu Ve Yai and Balapalla Me Mune Hati as well as played a supportive role. Ritigala Sirimanna played the role of her boyfriend with Rukmani Devi in the 1957 film 'Siriyalatha' and wrote all the songs for the film. He wrote the song "Mee Saumya Rathri Gevila Yathi" for the 1968 film Sepali. Then wrote the popular song "Chandraya Paya Enawa Priye" for the 1965 film Hitata Hitha and the song "Wanamalata Asave" for the 1965 film Satha Panaha. In 1970, Herbert played a military captain in the film Senehasa, where he later won the award for the Best Actor at the 1970 Sarasaviya Awards. He was also the director and producer of this film.

He later wrote screenplays for two films he directed: Ran Ethana in 1981 and Situ Diyaniya in 1982. He also acted in and composed songs for these two films.

== Filmography ==
Year	Film	Roles	Ref.
1952	Umathu Wishwasaya	Lyricist	
1953	Kele Handa	Lyricist	
1954	Iranganie		
1954	Radala Piliruwa	Lyricist, Actor: Gilbert	
1955	Asoka	Lyricist	
1956	Dosthara	Lyricist, Actor: Ranjith	
1957	Siriyalatha	Lyricist, Actor: Sirimanne Ritigalle	
1957	Sukumali	Lyricist	
1958	Sepali	Lyricist	
1962	Daskon	Lyricist	
1964	Heta Pramada Wadi	Lyricist	
1965	Handapana	Lyricist, screenwriter, producer, Actor: Sena Galpatha, Charlie	
1965	Hithata Hitha	Lyricist	
1966	Satha Panaha	Lyricist	
1969	Senehasa	Director, producer, screenwriter, lyricist	
1969	Athulweema Thahanam	Lyricist	
1969	Preweshamwanna	Lyricist	
1972	Miringuwa	Lyricist	
1978	Mage Ran Putha	Lyricist	
1981	Ran Ethana	Director, screenwriter, lyricist	
1982	Situ Diyaniya	Director, Source Author, lyricist	
1985	Regina	Lyricist	
