= Madras Mail =

Madras Mail may refer to:

- The Mail (newspaper), known as The Madras Mail till 1928, an English-language daily evening newspaper
- Madras Mail (film), a 1936 Indian Tamil language film
- Howrah–Madras Mail, a mail train in India
- Mangalore–Madras Mail, a mail train in India
- Trivandrum–Madras Mail, a mail train in India
