= Aruna Shanthi =

Sri Lankan actor and singer

Aruna Shanthi අරුණ ශාන්ති
- Born: Palihawadana Arachchige Cyril Perera; 12 February 1926; Weliwita, British Ceylon
- Died: 22 September 1992 (aged 66); Kalutara, Sri Lanka
- Education: Dharmadutha College; St. Bede's College
- Occupations: Film actor, singer, screenwriter
- Years active: 1949–1992

Palihawadana Arachchige Cyril Perera (12 February 1926 – 22 September 1992 as Sinhala: අරුණ ශාන්ති), popularly known by his stage name Aruna Shanthi, was an actor and playback singer in Sri Lankan cinema.

== Personal life ==
Cyril was born on 12 February 1926 in Weliwita, Kaduwela, Sri Lanka. His father died when Cyril's mother was pregnant with Cyril. He was educated at Dharmadutha College and St. Bede's College, Badulla (currently known as Badulla Central College). He has spent for some time attended St. Anthony's College, Kadawatha, Padukka Central College and Don Bosco College, Hanwella. His best friend at this time was Kingsley Kodippili, elder brother of popular actor Rex Kodippili. At the age of 17, Cyril competed in boxing and won first place.

He was married to Rose Dilma, whom he met at a party in Wellawatte in 1949. The couple has five sons: Neville, Ranjan, Tony, Sumith, Lucien and one daughter, Sohani Augusta. Youngest son Sumith is also a singer. In 1997, the fourth brother Niranjan sang a song with Latha Walpola. In 1983, Sumith recorded 14 songs sung by his father.

In his late years, he suffered a lung cancer. He died on 22 September 1992 at the age of 66.

== Career ==
Since school times, he had a passion for music and drama. In school stage, he got the opportunity to play the lead role in the play Yamtham Beruna written by Dr. Gunapala Malalasekera. He finished third in the 1947 Young Handsome Younger (Junior Mr. Ceylon) competition. He was a regular member of the singing choir of Weliwita Church where he enriched his voice and also excelled as a singer. He later joined stage dramas and performed in many years. During Tower Hall drama era he acted in the play Nagara Shobhani which was assisted by the then Prime Minister Ranasinghe Pedramadasa.

When he was a stage actor, he wanted to act in a film and sought the help of his cousin Willie Jayamanne. Under his cousin, Cyril got the opportunity to meet B. A. W. Jayamanne. Then he was selected to play the lead role in the film Peralena Iranama opposite to Rukmani Devi. But his mother refused to travel India for shooting. But, when he told mother that he would commit suicide if he was not allowed to go to India to act in a film, his mother gave permission. In the film, he sang four songs, including: 'Paape Me Jeevithe', 'Olu Male Sudo Sudu' and 'Hada Adara Pem Mandire'.

The film was released in Sri Lanka on 20 October 1949, which was directed by J. P. Sinha. According to Cyril Perera, rumors circulated that he and the lead actress of the film have a relationship. The news that spread even in the studios in India where the Rukmani's husband Eddie Jayamanne also questioned about the truth of the rumor. Eddie came to the studio and made a big fuss saying that it should not be mentioned in the casting that the lead actor Cyril Perera is acting with Rukmani Devi. He was of the firm opinion that the names of the two of lead artists should be removed if his name was to be so placed. Later, a person suggested that the name Cyril Perera should be replaced by another name suitable for cinema, where another person suggested the name 'Aruna Shanthi'.

In 1953, he was selected to the main role of the A. B. Raj's film Prema Tharagaya. Later, along with Joseph Wanigaratne, a relative of Aruna Shanthi, he directed the film Deviyani Oba Kohida. Some clergy and laity in the Catholic Church are divided into two groups, and argued about the theme of the film, however the film was screened without any delay. In 1964, he produced the film Sasaraka Hati directed by S. Ramanadan. Even after that, he played various roles in films: Mamai Rajā, Sināsenna Raththaran, Yukthiyaṭa Væḍa, Ali Babā Saha Horu Hathaḷiha, Sihina Ahasē Vasantē, and Ves Valāgath Tharuṇiya. While filming Ran Hadawatha directed by his nephew, Bertrum Perera, he became ill for the first time.

In 1984 at 6th Presidential Award, he won a Merit Award for his role in the film Muhudu Lihini. Then in 1990 at 18th Sarasaviya Awards, he won the Best Performance Award for the film Sinasenna Raththaran.

== Legacy ==
His children are celebrating with a Commemorative Concert in every year. On 23 December 2017, Aruna Shanthi Concert was held at 4.30 pm at the Auditorium of the Kalutara Divisional Secretariat.

== Filmography ==
Year	Film	Roles	Ref.
1949	Peralena Iranama	Playback Singer, Upali	
1953	Prema Tharangaya	Premadasa	
1956	Ramyalatha	Premasiri	
1958	Sohoyuro		
1959	Ma Aale Kala Tharuniya	Panagoda	
1960	Vana Mala		
1964	Sasaraka Hati	Wimal	
1964	Patachara		
1965	Sekaya	Dharmaratne	
1968	Pini Bindu		
1973	Hondai Narakai		
1974	Duppathage Hithawatha	Michael	
1976	Nilla Soya		
1977	Deviyani Oba Kohida?	Director, screenwriter	
1977	Chin Chin Nona		
1977	Chandi Puta		
1978	Tikira	Eddie Samarasekara	
1979	Jeewana Kandulu		
1979	Subhani	Screenwriter	
1981	Ajasaththa		
1982	Sudu Ayya	Screenwriter, Ananda's Father 'Loku Unnahe'	
1983	Muhudu Lihini		
1986	Devduwa		
1986	Jaya Apatai		
1986	Dinuma	Forest Inspector	
1987	Raja Wadakarayo	Police Chief	
1987	Obatai Priye Adare	Silva	
1988	Angulimala		
1988	Satana		
1988	Ko Hathuro		
1989	Mamai Raja	Father of Ruwan	
1989	Obata Rahasak Kiyannam		
1989	Sinasenna Raththaran		
1990	Chandi Raja		
1990	Honda Honda Sellam	Geeta and Neeta's father	
1991	Paaradise		
1991	Weda Barinam Wadak Na		
1991	Sihina Ahase Wasanthaya		
1991	Hithata Dukak Nati Miniha		
1991	Raja Sellam		
1991	Esala Sanda		
1991	Ran Hadawatha		
1991	Alibaba Saha Horu Hathaliha		
1992	Sakvithi Raja		
1992	Chandi Rajina		
1992	Kiyala Wadak Na	Siriwardena	
1992	Me Ware Mage		
1992	Sinhayangeth Sinhaya	Mr. Peiris	
