= Mark Samaranayake =

Sri Lankan actor (1914–2000)

- මාක් සමරනායක
- Born: Hettiarachchige Don Marcus Conrad Senarathna Samaranayake; April 8, 1914; Gampaha, Sri Lanka
- Died: June 4, 2000 (aged 86); Colombo, Sri Lanka
- Education: Saint Joseph's College, Colombo
- Occupations: Actor, dramatist, producer, Assistant director
- Years active: 1945–1992
- Parents: Charles Samaranayake (father); Dona Isabella Perera (mother)
- Awards: "Swarna Jayanthi" Award

Hettiarachchige Don Marcus Conrad Senarathna Samaranayake (born 8 April 1914 – died 4 June 2000 as මාක් සමරනායක) [Sinhala]), popularly known as Mark Samaranayake, was an actor in Sri Lankan cinema and stage drama. One of the earliest pillars in Sinhala cinema, Samaranayake acted in several critically acclaimed films such as Peralena Iranama, Perakadoru Bena, Kapati Arakshakaya, Duppathage Duka, and Daivayogaya.

== Personal life ==
He was born on 8 April 1914 in Weliveriya, Gampaha, as the fifth child in a family with eight siblings. His father, Charles Samaranayake, was a notary, and his mother, Dona Isabella Perera, was a housewife. He had three elder sisters, Josephine, Harriet, and Lori; an elder brother, George; two sisters, Ellison and Marie; and a younger brother, Benedict. His father died when Mark was a child.

He received his primary education at the Sinhala School in Weliweriya and then went to Saint Joseph's College, Colombo, for secondary education. Famous actor Laddie Ranasinghe was his classmate. In their youth, Mark and Laddie attended St. Aloysius Seminary, where his father dedicated Mark to the church.

In 1950, he married Pearl Jayawardena, a fellow actress. The couple had two daughters, Shirani and Damayanthi, and one son, Tiron. His eldest daughter, Shirani, died at a hospital in Paris in February 2014. She was a mother of three who made a minor role in the film Duppathage Duka as a child artist in 1956. Her funeral took place on 15 February 2014 in Paris.

He died on 4 June 2000 at the age of 86 after a severe illness.

== Career ==
At the age of 14, the college held an open singing competition, where Mark became the winner and Laddie became the runner-up. After school, Mark worked as an assistant agricultural inspector in the Army. During this period in 1945, he met Laddie by accident in Pettah. Laddie invited Mark to join in his stage drama. He accepted the offer, went to the Arcadian Drama Club in Borella, and acted in the play Mathabhedaya. After that, Mark also formed the Drama Society called 'Lunuwila Victory' in 1946 and produced three stage plays: Andha Aalaya, Wasanawa, and Aladdin. He later made a play called Riyadura, co-starring Josephine Jayalath, the elder sister of popular actress Florida Jayalath.

When the play Riyadura was performed in Negombo, famous artists Rukmani Devi and Eddie Jayamanne of the then Minerva Drama Troupe participated in watching the play. Later in the day, he was invited to meet Eddie and Rukmani at their home in Bolavalana. Then, Eddie introduced Mark to filmmaker B. A. W. Jayamanne. Jayamanne casts Mark as the school inspector in his 1948 film Kapati Arakshakaya.

After the success of the film, he was selected for many films. In 1949, he played Rukmani's 'evil husband' in Peralena Iranama. Then, he became the 'Hetti' in Weradunu Kurumanama (1948) and 'carpenter' in Perakadoru Bena in 1955. Then, his notable acting came as an arrogant woman, a 'cunning magician' in Ahankara Sthree, and Buddhi in Matalan in 1955. In 1956, he made his most dramatic character 'Inspector Jayasinghe' in the film Duppathage Duka. In the film, his friend Laddie acts as the main antagonist 'Baladeva' and his wife, Pearl, as 'Baladeva's sister.' His acting in the film is rated as one of the best earliest performances in Sinhala cinema.

In his last years, he played several characters of an elderly father in film such as Thushara, Sahanaya, Me Desa Kumatada, and Aege Adara Kathawa. As an assistant director, he was involved in Siriyalatha, Daivayogaya, and Magul Poruwa films. His portrayal of the elderly ascetic 'Ruchika' in Daivayogaya was critically acclaimed. He last acted in the film Viyaru Minisa in 1992. Later, in 1997, he was honored with the "Swarna Jayanthi" Award for contributing to Sinhala cinema at the 11th Presidential Award.

== Filmography ==
Year	Film	Role	Ref.
1948	Kapati Arakshakaya	School Inspector	
1948	Weradunu Kurumanama	Hettaiyya	
1949	Peralena Iranama	Arrogant husband	
1951	Segawunu Pilithura	Douglas	
1952	Umathu Wishwasaya	Buddhi	
1953	Prema Tharangaya	Wickrama	
1953	Puduma Leli	Doctor Appu Hamy LLMS	
1954	Ahankara Sthree	Professor Surasena F.R.O.G.	
1955	Mathabhedaya	Podi Mahathaya	
1955	Mathalan	Buddhi	
1955	Perakadory Bena	Hector Sathurusinghe	
1956	Dosthara	Dharme	
1956	Duppathage Duka	Inspector Jayasinghe	
1957	Surasena	Inspector	
1957	Ramyalatha	Sunny	
1957	Siriyalatha	Victor Gunasekera	
1958	Sepali		
1959	Daivayogaya	Ruwaka	
1963	Mangalika		
1964	Samiya Birindage Deviyaya		
1965	Landaka Mahima		
1966	Mahadena Muththa	6th member identifier	
1967	Hitha Giya Thena		
1967	Pipena Kumudu	Doctor Gunawansa	
1967	Rahas Dupatha		
1967	Magul Poruwa		
1968	Dehadaka Duka	Kiri Banda	
1969	Pickpocket	Abusive Shopkeeper	
1969	Pancha		
1971	Sahanaya		
1972	Me Desa Kumatada	Mudalithuma' 'Hamu Mahthaya	
1973	Thushara	Loku Mahathaya 'Douglas'	
1973	Hondai Narakai		
1974	Sheela	Mr. Gunawardena	
1974	Shanthi		
1974	Lasanda	Amaris	
1975	Raththaran Amma		
1976	Kawuda Raja	Pinhamy	
1976	Pradeepe Ma Wewa		
1976	Hariyata Hari	Mr. Gunathilake 'Loku Mahathaya'	
1976	Deviyange Theenduwa	Babanis	
1976	Ran Thilaka		
1977	Deviyani Oba Kohida	Mudalali	
1977	Yali Ipade		
1977	Chandi Putha		
1977	Aege Adara Kathawa		
1978	Apsara		
1979	Minisun Athara Minisek		
1979	Hingana Kolla	Lawyer	
1979	Akke Mata Awasara	Garden owner	
1979	Sawudan Jema		
1980	Bambara Pahasa	Suraweera	
1981	Ajasaththa	Wasala Maha Amathi	
1981	Geethika	Mr. Samaranayake	
1981	Anjaana		
1982	Wathura Karaththaya	Judge	
1983	Sister Mary	Bishop	
1984	Jaya Sikurui		
1985	Rosy		
1986	Jaya Apatai		
1987	Yukthiyada Shakthiyada		
1987	Obatai Priye Adare	Grandfather	
1988	Sandakada Pahana		
1988	Angulimala		
1989	Mamai Raja	Murdered girl's father	
1991	Raja Kello		
1991	Raja Sellam		
1992	Suwandena Suwandak		
1992	Viyaru Minisa		
