= Thaai Nadu =

- Directed by: T. S. Mani
- Screenplay by: T. V. Natarajasamy (dialogues)
- Story by: T. S. Mani
- Produced by: S. M. Nayagam
- Starring: Battling Mani; S. T. Williams; V. P. S. Mani; T. K. Krishnaiah; M. R. Sundari; N. C. Meera
- Music by: R. Narayana Iyer
- Production company: Chitrakala Movietone
- Release date: 15 August 1947 (India)
- Running time: 155 minutes
- Country: India
- Language: Tamil

Thaai Nadu (transl. Motherland) is a 1947 Indian Tamil-language film directed by T. S. Mani. The film stars Battling Mani in the lead role.

== Cast ==
The list is adapted from Film News Anandan's database.

- Battling Mani
- S. T. Williams
- V. P. S. Mani
- T. K. Krishnaiah
- M. R. Sundari
- N. C. Meera

== Production ==
The film was produced by S. M. Nayagam, who produced the first ever Sinhala talkie Kadawunu Poronduwa, under his own banner Chitrakala Movietone and was directed by T. S. Mani. T. S. Mani also wrote the story and screenplay. Dialogues were penned by T. V. Natarajasamy. G. G. Sithi handled cinematography while the editing was done by Abraham. Art direction was by Kotvankar and still photography was done by V. V. Iyer.

== Soundtrack ==
Music was composed by R. Narayana Iyer while the lyrics were penned by T. V. Natarajasamy.

List of songs

1. Engal Indhiya Bharathiye - V. N. Sundaram, A. P. Komala

== Reception ==
Writing in 2017, media person D. B. S. Jeyaraj said, "The film was a smashing box office hit."
