= Rita Ratnayake =

Sri Lankan actress (1934–2006)

- රීටා රත්නායක
- Born: Rita Philomina Ratnayake; February 18, 1934; Matale, Sri Lanka
- Died: November 6, 2006 (aged 72); Colombo
- Education: St. Agnes' College, Matale
- Occupation: Actress
- Years active: 1953–1988
- Spouse: W. A. Wilfred Silva (m. 1961)
- Children: 2
- Father: Emil Ratnayake

Rita Philomina Ratnayake (18 February 1934 – 6 November 2006 රීටා රත්නායක) was an actress in Sri Lankan cinema. She became very popular in the 1950s, 1960s and 1970s early Sinhala cinema particularly with the role 'Daisy Attanayake' in the blockbuster Kele Handa in 1953.

== Personal life ==
She was born in 1934 in Matale, Sri Lanka. Her father Emil Ratnayake was a famous violinist. She grew up in her mother's hometown of Matale and studied at St. Agnes' College, Matale (currently known as St. Thomas' Girls' College). During school period, she played the role 'Queen Pramila' in the stage play Daskon. Also known as a school singer, she was famous among Matale students for singing the song Ko Mama Nandage Male. Rita also worked for the Sri Lanka Hotel Corporation for some time.

Rita married W.A. Wilfred Silva on February 18, 1960. Wilfred is best known as a songwriter, storyteller and film director. The couple had a daughter and a son named Sadhana and Bandula. In late years, she went to France for a job.

She died on 6 November 2006 at the Jayewardenepura Hospital on the same day she received an honorary gift from the Silumina 'Rasaduna' newspaper. She was 72 years old at the age of demise. As her last request, she was buried at the Matale Cemetery where her mother was buried.

== Career ==
By the time she got involved in the arts, two of her uncles were playing female characters in stage plays. She was a die-hard fan of Rukmani Devi and watched all her movies since she was a child, also wanted to see Rukmani Devi. Popular actress Clarice de Silva was her close friend where Rita asked Clarice to come up with a way to see Rukmani Devi.

Ratnayake was first noticed when she ran into film actors B. A. W. Jayamanne, Rukmani Devi and Eddie Jayamanne while on a pilgrimage to Madhu Church in 1952 (Note: Divaina newspaper cited she met them in 1948 during an interview with Rita Ratnayake. However leading cinema source Sarasaviya recorded she met Jayamanne and Rukamani in 1952.) This encounter led to her casting in Kele Handa. A 16 year old Rita played the adult role of 'Daisy Attanayake'. Several people said that her Sinhala pronunciation was not successful and trained her for about 6 months. After Kele Handa, Rita played the role of an innocent girlfriend. Seeing her acting prowess, K. Gunaratnam used Rita for the lead role in the film Warada Kageda in 1954. The she acted in the role 'Prabhawathi' in Ramyalatha (1956) and had leading roles in Radala Piliruwa (1954), Sukumali (1957) and Sithaka Mahima (1964).

Over the next 20 years, Ratnayake had roles in Suneetha, Sepali (1958), Sundara Birinda (1960), Daruwa Kageda (1961), Suhada Sohoyuro (1963), Suba Sarana Sepa Sithe (1964), Sweep Ticket, Sakaya (1965), Ethulweema Thahanam (1966), Amathaka Wunada (1967), Dan Mathakada (1970), Suhada Pethuma (1973), Sheela, Shanthi, Onna Babo Billo Enawa (1974), Awa Soya Adare (1975), Haratha Hathara, Dewiyange Theenduwa (1976), Hithuwoth Hithuwamai, Saja (1977), Mage Ran Putha (1978), Eka Hitha (1979), Dayabara Nilu (1981), Samawenna (1981), Wathura Karaththaya (1982), Rail Para (1982), Bonikka (1983), Shirani, Kokila, Namal Renu (1984) and Wana Rejina (1988).

She acted a lot with the fellow actor Asoka Ponnamperuma, mostly as his wife. Rita won the Best Actress award for the film Sithaka Mahima at the 2nd United Lanka Fans Society Award in 1966. In 1985, she won a Merit Award for Sitaka Mahima at the 1965 Sarasaviya Awards. In 1997, she won the "Swarna Jayanthi" Award at 11th Presidential Award. Then in 1998, she was honored with "Namaskara Pooja" Special Award at the 25th Sarasaviya Awards. She later appeared in the television serial Kahala Nadaya.

== Filmography ==
Year	Film	Role	Ref.
1953	Kele Handa	Daisy Attanayake	
1954	Warada Kageda	Vineetha	
1954	Radala Piliruwa	Nanda	
1956	Ramyalatha	Pabawathi	
1957	Sukumali	Leela	
1958	Suneetha	Suneetha	
1958	Sepali		
1960	Sundara Birinda	Soma	
1961	Daruwa Kageda	Premawathie	
1963	Suhada Sohoyuro		
1964	Sithaka Mahima		
1964	Suba Sarana Sepa Sithe		
1965	Sweep Ticket		
1965	Sekaya	Manike	
1966	Athulweema Thahanam		
1967	Amathaka Unada		
1970	Dan Mathakada	Alice	
1973	Suhada Pathuma		
1974	Sheela	Mrs. Karunaratne	
1974	Shanthi		
1974	Ona Babo Billo Enawa	Asha's mother	
1975	Awa Soya Adare		
1976	Haratha Hathara		
1976	Deviyange Theenduwa	Susila	
1977	Sajaa		
1977	Hithuwoth Hithuwamai	Apsara's mother	
1978	Mage Ran Putha		
1979	Eka Hitha		
1981	Dayabara Nilu	Violet 'Mommy'	
1981	Samawenna	Nimalka's mother	
1982	Wathura Karaththaya	Sampath's wife	
1983	Bonikka	Rupa Wickremasinghe	
1984	Shirani	Namal and Manjula's mother	
1984	Kokila		
1984	Namal Renu		
1988	Wana Rajina		
