= Abudasse kale =

- Directed by: Kumar Wickremasooriya
- Written by: Kumar Wickremasooriya
- Release date: 1968
- Country: Sri Lanka
- Language: Sinhalese

Abudasse kale is a 1968 Sri Lankan film directed by Kumar Wickremasooriya.

== Cast ==
- Rukmani Devi
- Malini Fonseka
- Eddie Jayamanne
- Vijitha Mallika
- D.R. Nanayakkara
