= Laddie Ranasinghe =

Sri Lankan actor (1913–1983)

Laddie Ranasinghe ලැඩී රණසිංහ
- Born: Ladislaus Perera Ranasinghe; March 23, 1913; Colombo, Sri Lanka
- Died: May 26, 1983 (aged 70); Colombo, Sri Lanka
- Education: De Mazenod College, Kandana, Saint Joseph's College, Colombo
- Occupations: Actor, producer
- Years active: 1940–1983

Ladislaus Perera Ranasinghe (23 March 1913 – 26 May 1983 Sinhala: ලැඩී රණසිංහ), popularly known as Laddie Ranasinghe was an actor in Sri Lankan cinema.

== Personal life ==
He was born on 23 March 1913 in Tudella, Ja-Ela, Colombo, Sri Lanka. He started primary education from Tudella Roman Catholic College and completed secondary education from De Mazenod College, Kandana and Saint Joseph's College, Colombo. Fellow actor Mark Samaranayake was his classmate. At one point Laddie and Mark joined Lady St. Aloysius Seminary to become priests. He stopped going to school and joined the police force. Shortly afterward he retired from the police service and resumed his schooling.

He learned English from the English School at the Chilaw Church and began his career as a translator for the Catholic Church. Meanwhile, he joined Bauer Company, Colombo.

Laddie died on 26 May 1983 at the age of 70.

== Career ==
While still in school, he became interested in the arts by performing in plays, and after his retirement, he continued to look for drama companies during the holidays. He met an artist named Joseph Perera in Tudelle. Then he went to meet the playwright Steven Silva with Joseph Perera. Later, Steven offered the lead role in the play Mathabhedaya to Ladis. He received popularity by the audience after series of island-wide shows of the play. He then played the lead role in the play Kurusiye Lakuna which was staged in Moratuwa. He was awarded the Gold Medal by the Rocklands Company by A.W. e. Mr. Gunasinghe. He also produced the stage play Yagnawe Mahimaya along with Hugo Fernando.

During this period, he joined with Minerva Drama troupe in 1939. While performing in the Minerva Drama troupe under B. A. W. Jayamanne, he changed his name to 'Laddie'. Coming forward as a stage actor, he formed the "Arcadians" drama troupe. Meanwhile, he also became a radio announcer as well as a radio dramatist at Radio Ceylon. In Velenda Sewaya of Radio Ceylon, he had the opportunity to work as a program producer. Meanwhile, the one-act play written by Laddie was published in the Sunday newspapers. One of his plays named Andare has become extremely popular among the readers.

In 1951, Laddie worked as a publicity officer for Tours Ltd., Colombo. He made his debut cinema appearance in the 1952 English film Outcast of the Islands shot in Sri Lanka. The film directed by Carol Reed was later translated to Sinhala as Divainwala Kulahinaya. He not only played the lead role in the film but also acted as a translator. This was the first English language film starring a Sinhala actor as well. His performance in the film brought world fame to Sri Lanka in the foreign countries where the film was screened. According to the Silumina newspaper, Laddie is the only actor who has made Sri Lanka famous and respected for his acting.

He got to play in the 1953 A. B. Rajj's film Ramyalatha which is a Nayagam production. Laddie asked for thirty thousand rupees for the performance in this film, which was later reduced to ten thousand. It is the biggest money earned by an actor in Sri Lanka at that time. Laddie's first feature film was the 1953 film Prema Tharagaya directed by A. B. Rajj. In the film, he played the role of an innocent clerk, a kind husband, and a loving father. Later he acted in a few films, a total of eleven. This is largely due to the high rates charged by him for a film. Therefore, Laddie became the first highest-paid Sri Lankan actor to act in a film before Gamini Fonseka. Because of this he rejected a number of characters such as: 'Juanis' from Ahankara Sthree, 'Priest' of Vanamohini.

His best performances in the films came through the roles 'Raphael Baas' in Radala Piliruwa, 'Baladeva' in Duppathage Duka, 'Suramba' in Suraya, 'Walhamu' in Sukomali.In 1956, he won the award for the Best Actor for his role in Duppathage Duka. In 1957, he again won the Best Actor award at the 1957 Deepashika Awards for the same role. His final cinema appearance came through the 1977 film Deviyani Oba Kohida.

== Filmography ==
Year	Film	Roles	Ref.
1948	Outcast of the Islands		
1953	Ramyalatha		
1953	Prema Tharangaya	Gunasiri	
1954	Warada Kageda	Jayantha Amarasekara	
1954	Radala Piliruwa	Rafeal Baas	
1956	Duppathage Duka	Janawarjana	
1957	Suraya	Suramba	
1957	Sukumali	Wal Hamu 'Hubert'	
1960	Veera Vijaya		
1963	Mangalika		
1965	La Dalu		
1967	Segawunu Menika		
1977	Deviyani Oba Kohida	Bishop	
