= Kele Handa =

1953 film by B. A. W. Jayamanne

- Directed by: B. A. W. Jayamanne
- Screenplay by: W. A. Silva
- Produced by: B. A. W. Jayamanne; S. D. T. Appuhami
- Starring: Rukmani Devi; Stanley Perera; Rita Ratnayake; Eddie Jayamanne; Mabel Blythe
- Music by: Herbert M. Seneviratne (lyrics); S. S. Weada (music)
- Release date: 27 May 1953
- Country: Sri Lanka
- Language: Sinhala

Kele Handa is a 1953 Sri Lankan romantic musical starring Rukmani Devi, Stanley Perera, Eddie Jayamanne, Rita Ratnayake and Mabel Blythe. It is based on a popular Sinhala novel by W. A. Silva.

The adaption was successful due to the book being widely read in school as part of the curriculum and schools brought in students on buses to see the film. It is technically poor and was shot inside a studio though the story pertained to village life.

== Plot summary ==
Love story of Malini, a village girl who goes to town to see the Vel festival and falls in love with a rich gentleman John Jayapala who pretends to be of low class.

== Cast ==
- Rukmani Devi as Malini
- Stanley Perera as John Jayapala
- Rita Ratnayake as Daisy Attanayake
- Eddie Jayamanne as Aanda
- Mabel Blythe as Missy
- B. A. W. Jayamanne
- Peter Peries
- Wimala Kumari
- Udula Dabare as Mourner

== Songs ==
- "Ho Manamalaya" – Eddie Jayamanne and Mabel Blythe
- "Aley Rahasame" – Eddie Jayamanne and Mabel Blythe
- "Mawila Penewe Rupe" – Rukmani Devi-mere qarar leja by lata-film aashiyana
- "Anna Sudo" – Rukmani Devi and Mohideen Baig-Apni Kaho Kuch meri suno-Talat and Lata from Parchchain
- "Mageya Prema Malini" – Rukmani Devi and Mohideen Baig (melody from Mohammed Rafi and Shamshad Begum's "Ada Se Jhoomte Hue" in 1952 Bollywood film Sinbad the Sailor)
- "Dewo Gin Mawa" – Rukmani Devi
- "Pema Amadara" – Mohideen Baig (melody from Talat Mehmood's "Dil Matwala" in 1952 Bollywood film Bewafa)
- "Maya" – Mohideen Baig-O Duniya Ke Rakhwale-BaijuBawra
- "Parana Pinak" – Eddie Jayamanne and Mabel Blythe (melody from Kishore Kumar and Geeta Dutt's "De Bhi Chooke Hum" in 1952 Bollywood film Jaal)
- "Dinne Dinne" – Kele Hande Singing Group
