= Kumaraguru =

- Directed by: Jyotish Sinha
- Produced by: S. M. Nayagam
- Starring: D. S. Krishna Iyer; Jayabala
- Cinematography: Prabhakar
- Music by: R. Narayana Iyer
- Production company: Chitrakala Movietone
- Release date: 6 September 1946 (India)
- Running time: 134 mins
- Country: India
- Language: Tamil

Kumaraguru is a 1946 Indian Tamil language film produced by Chitrakala Movietone and directed by Jyotish Sinha. The film featured D. S. Krishna Iyer, Jayabala and others.

== Cast ==
The following list was adapted from the database of Film News Anandan.

- D. S. Krishna Iyer
- Jayabala
- Vidwan Mani
- Radha
- Thanjavur Mani

== Production ==
This is the first film produced by Chitrakala Movietone a company that was located in Madurai. The company was owned by S. M. Nayagam who also was the producer of this film. Kumaraguru was directed by Jyotish Sinha. Prabhakar handled the cinematography.
