= Sunil Mihindukula =

Sri Lankan journalist (1960–2017)

Sunil Mihindukula සුනිල් මිහිඳුකුල
- Born: Mihindukulasuriya Sunil Kaithan Fernando; 22 September 1960; Negombo, Sri Lanka
- Died: 30 May 2017 (aged 56); Colombo, Sri Lanka
- Education: Maris Stella College
- Occupations: Journalist, scriptwriter, researcher, author, columnist, film critic, film & drama art archivist
- Years active: 1978–2016
- Spouse: Suraji Karunathilake
- Children: 4 Sachindra Mihindukula, Shehan Mihindukula, Shanaka Mihindukula, Sanjula Mihindukula
- Awards: President's Award

Mihindukulasuriya Sunil Kaithan Fernando also known as Sunil Mihindukula (Sinhala: සුනිල් මිහිඳුකුල), was a Sri Lankan journalist, film critic, and author. He was born on 22 September 1960. He is well known for his work in cinema, literature, and drama.

== Career ==
Mihindukula's interest in films began when attending Maris Stella College in Negombo. After graduating, he worked with several media personalities, including Gunasiri Silva, Jayantha Chandrasiri and Prem Dissanayake. His career in journalism began at the Navaliya magazine, where he wrote articles on art that were edited by Jayantha Chandrasiri. In 1978, he began his career in film journalism with an article for Sakura Magazine, edited by Gunasiri Silva. Mihindukula continued to work with Silva on his publications and later contributed to Vichithra publications, which was compiled by Prem Dissanayake in 1987. In 1979, he joined the Lankadeepa newspaper as a featured writer and then joined the national political newspaper Sathdina, which he then wrote articles on literature. In the invitation, editor Wimalendra Wathuregama Mihindukula also joined the film newspaper Piyakaru to write film critiques.

Mihindukula also wrote articles as a freelance journalist for magazines such as Sinesith. In 1981, he wrote his first film review for Lankadeepa, which covered Sugathapala Senarath Yapa's film "Induta Mal Mitak". In the same year, he joined the editorial staff of Desathiya, published by the Government Information Department. In 1984, he wrote articles for the periodicals Kalpana and Peramaga.

In 1988, Mihindukula joined the film newspaper Kala. In 1990, he joined as an editor for the cinema page of the Ravaya newspaper and started working as a film writer for Udaya Tennakoon's Thira Tharu. In 1991, he held the post of Publication Assistant at the Social and Peace Center. In 1994, he wrote for the film newspaper Rasa, edited by Ernest Waduge. Mihindukula joined Associated Newspapers of Ceylon Limited (Lake House or ANCL) as a full-time journalist in the mid-1990s and was appointed as the sub-editor of the Dinamina newspaper in 1995. After that, he then became the deputy editor of the Sarasaviya newspaper and became the chief editor in 2009.

While being the deputy editor of Sarasaviya, he also joined Silumina in 2007 as an editor of the Rasaduna tabloid anthology, which was published with the Silumina weekend newspaper and was compiled by Dharmasiri Gamage. His column Paryalokaya in the Silumina Literary Supplement covered drama. Mihindukula compiled Rasaduna for over a decade and concurrently served as co-editor of Silumina.

As a film critic, Mihindukula served on the Film Jury at several film festivals and was a member of the Arts Sub-Committee under the Department of Culture and the Teledrama Pre-Monitoring Board. He was also the editor of the film magazine Sadisi, published by the Sri Lanka Film Corporation. Over four decades, he published more than 1,000 articles on Sinhala cinema and other fields of art in various newspapers. He worked at Lake House until his retirement from journalism in 2016. At the invitation of Sarasaviya editor Aruna Gunaratne, he started writing a series of articles entitled "Natyakaruwo Saha Owunge Nirmana" in mid-2016, which were published weekly in Sarasaviya following his retirement earlier that year.

Mihindukula received the Presidential Cinema Award for his contributions to cinema and journalism at the Presidential Film Festival. On 29 December 2005, he won the Cyril B. Perera Memorial Cinema Literary Award at the SIGNIS Award Ceremony, held at the Elphinstone Theatre, Colombo 10. He also received the Cine Media Vision Film Writing Award and a Raigam Tele'es Merit Award for his screenplay for Roopawalokanaya National Television at the Raigam Tele'es. On 4 May 2017, an event at the Mass Media Ministry auditorium acknowledged Mihindukula’s contributions to cinema and cinema literature. During this event, the book Sunil Mihindukula Cinema Sahithya Sampradana, edited by Prof. Samantha Herath and writer/poet Buddadasa Galappatti, was released.

== Authored works ==
Mihindukula wrote his first book, a biography titled Rukmani Devi Niliya Gayikawa Ha Janapriya Sanskruthiya in 1989. In 1991, he published a film review for Thun Man Handiya, directed by Mahagama Sekara. In 1997, he published three books: Minerva Theater Group, Kadawunu Poronduwa, and Lester James Pieris Sinhala Cinemawe Jayakodi Lakuna. He also wrote a film review on fellow film critic Jayawilal Wilegoda. In 2010, he published Cinema Sanskruthiya Pragnaya about Tissa Abeysekara. He also authored Sinhala Cinema Sihiawatana, Cinemawata Hedinweemak, Sri Lankeya Demala Bhashitha Cinemawa, Indeeya Cinemawe Dahathunweni Bhashawa, Uththama Purusha Eka Wachana, and Sinhala Cinemawe Arbudha.

In 2012, he wrote Picture Pissa. His books covered a range of topics related to cinema, including film data, information on filmmakers, and film reviews. In addition, he wrote about drama and the columns he had written for various newspapers. Mihindukula's last book, Ranjith Dharmakeerthi Natyavalokanaya, edited by Edward Chandrasiri, was released in September 2020, after his death.

=== List of works ===
- Rukmani Devi Niliya Gayikawa Ha Janapriya Sanskruthiya
- Thunman Handiya Vicharaya
- Minerva Theater Group
- Kadawunu Poronduwa Vicharaya
- Lester James Pieris Sinhala Cinemawe Jayakodi Lakuna
- Jayawilal Wilegoda Cinema Wichara
- Cinema Sanskruthika Pragnaya
- Sinhala Cinema Sihiawatana
- Cinemawata Hedinweemak
- Sri Lankeya Demala Bhashitha Cinemawa
- Indeeya Cinemawe Dahathunweni Bhashawa
- Uththama Purusha Eka Wachana
- Paryaloka
- Sinhala Cinemawe Arbudha
- Ranjith Dharmakeerthi Natyavalokanaya

== Personal life ==
Sunil Mihindukula was born on 22 September 1960 in Negombo, Sri Lanka in a Catholic family. He graduated from Maris Stella College.

Mihindukula was married to Suraji Karunathilake, an officer who worked with the Information Department. They had four sons: Sachindra, Shehan, Shanaka, and Sanjula Mihindukula.

Mihindukula died on 30 May 2017 at the age of 56 and was cremated on 1 June 2017 at the Rukmalgama General Cemetery.
