= Battling Mani =

Indian actor

Battling Mani in Madras Mail

Battling Mani is an Indian cinema artiste who worked mainly in Tamil films.

== Career ==
=== Silent films ===
During the period of silent films, most of the films were made with stories already known to the people. But they introduced attractive dances and stunt scenes to capture the audience's enthusiasm. There were two stunt artistes working at that time. One was Battling Mani and the other was Stunt Raju.

=== Tamil talkies ===
In 1936, the very first action film in Tamil was produced and released. Battling Mani was the obvious choice for the main role that was a daring young man with full of stunt works. He also wrote the story of this film, Madras Mail was a huge success.

Miss Sundari was his next film released in 1937. P. S. Sivapackiam paired with him in this film.

After a few years he featured in the lead role of Thaai Nadu that was released on the day India became an independent nation, 15 August 1947.

=== As director ===
In 1938 he directed the one and only film Harijana Singam or Madras CID, a film that had two alternate titles as per the norms of the day. He also featured in the lead role.

== Filmography ==
Year	Film	Language	Director	Writer	Actor	Notes
1936	Madras Mail	Tamil	✗	✓	✓	
1937	Miss Sundari	Tamil	✗	✗	✓	
1938	Harijana Singam or Madras CID	Tamil	✓	✗	✓	
1947	Thaai Nadu	Tamil	✗	✗	✓	
1951	Marudhanaattu Ilavarasi	Tamil	✗	✗	✓	
