= Madras Mail (film) =

- Poster
- Directed by: C. M. Trivedi
- Screenplay by: (Dialogues) P. R. Rajagopala Iyer
- Story by: Battling Mani
- Produced by: Ramaniklal Mohanlal
- Starring: Battling Mani; T. N. Meenakshi
- Cinematography: Rajinikanth Pondiya
- Edited by: Indukumar Bhat
- Music by: S. N. Ranganathan
- Production company: Mohan Pictures
- Release date: 1936
- Country: India
- Language: Tamil

Madras Mail is a 1936 Indian Tamil-language action film directed by C. N. Trivedi. The film stars Battling Mani and T. N. Meenakshi. It is recognised as the first action film in Tamil cinema.

== Plot ==
Sekar is a kindhearted young man who helps others. He falls in love with Meena, the daughter of a zamindar, despite an initial clash between them. Sekar is trying to get a government job, but Murugesh, a minister in the princely state, desires to marry Meena. To thwart Sekar, Murugesh has him jailed on false charges. With the help of an inmate, Sekar escapes from the jail.

Sekar renames himself as Madras Mail. He begins punishing wrongdoers and helps ordinary people. Meanwhile, Meena is abducted by someone, prompting the zamindar to file a police complaint, and a search is going on. Madras Mail rescues and brings back Meena, revealing that Murugesh was behind her abduction. The zamindar sends Murugesh to jail, releases Sekar and allows him to marry Meena.

== Cast ==
Male cast

- Battling Mani as Sekar
- S. R. K. Iyengar as Murugesh
- S. S. Kokko as the inmate
- Kalaiman as Senapathi
- S. N. R. Nathan as the Bhajan singer
- Jayaraman as the poor man

Female cast

- T. N. Meenakshi as Meena
- Chellam as Ramani

== Production ==
The film was produced by Ramaniklal Mohanlal under the banner Mohan Pictures and was directed by C. N. Trivedi. Battling Mani wrote the story while the dialogues were penned by P. R. Rajagopala Iyer. Cinematography was done by Rajinikanth Bondiya, while Indukumar Bhat did the editing. Madras Mail is recognised as the first action film in Tamil.

== Soundtrack ==
Music was composed by S. N. Ranganathan while P. R. Rajagopala Iyer wrote the lyrics.

== Reception ==
Historian G. Dhananjayan noted that, in a period when filmgoers were shown films with historical and mythological stories, this action film created a sensation among the audience. He said this was the forerunner to many such films that followed suit.
