= St. Peter's College, Negombo =

St. Peter’s College, Negombo
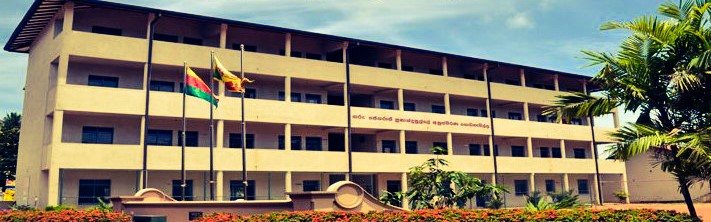

Location
- Fernando Avenue; Negombo; Sri Lanka
- Coordinates: 7.2121°N 79.8404°E

Information
- School type: Provincial
- Motto: Sinhala: විනය දැනුම අඳුර නසයි, romanized: Vinaya danuma andura nasai (Discipline and Knowledge Clears Darkness)
- Religious affiliation: Roman Catholic
- Founded: 2 July 1903; 122 years ago
- Principal: K. D. R. W. D. Fernando
- Teaching staff: ~200
- Grades: 1-13
- Gender: Co-educational
- Age range: 5-19
- Enrollment: ~4,000
- Classes: ~80
- Average class size: 40
- Language: English and Sinhala
- Houses: Keerthi, Shakthi and Pragathi
- Colors: Red, yellow & green
- Song: "Helayē Sōbhā"
- Publication: Kawluwa

St. Peter’s College (Sinhala: සාන්ත පීතර විදුහල, romanized: Sāntha Pīthara viduhala; Tamil: செயிண்ட் பீட்டர் கல்லூர) (also known as St. Peter's Central College) is a Roman Catholic school in Negombo, Sri Lanka with a history of over a century.

== History ==
In the early 20th century, French Catholic Priest, Fr. Esric wanted to start a school in the coastal area close to Negombo to provide education to children of fisherfolk in the region. The Mission of the school was aimed to provide formal education to Sinhalese speaking community in the region.

St. Peter's College, Negombo was founded on 2 July 1903. Initially, the school was called "Banana Stall School" (Sinhala: කෙසෙල්කන් කඩේ ඉස්කෝලෙ, romanized: Keselkan Kade Iskole) as the banana market of the town was close by.

H. M. Faris served as the first principal of the school, where the initial student enrollment was 33. Three teachers Messrs Simon, Wilbert, and Anthony who served for the benefit of the children. In 1967 Fr. Stanley Mellwa and the Minister of Education, I. M. R. A. Iriyagolla declared the school as a Maha Vidyalaya. Soon after, school started to develop gradually under P. A. D. Aquinas, P. A. P. Nonis, Jayanath Mendis, D. C. E. Madurasinghe and M. C. O. Fernando.

When John Fernando became the principal of the school, as the school was promoted to a Central School. B. J. P. Perera became the principal after Fernando.

Under principal, H.M.S. Bandara, the school acquired a large number of infrastructure facilities. After the retirement of H.M.S. Bandara, K. D. S. T. Silva became the principal. In 2013, K. D. W. D. R. Fernando assumed duties as the principal.

Currently, the school has about 4,000 students in classes from grades 1 to 13 in both English and Sinhala mediums.

== Houses ==
Name	Motto	Colour
Keerthi	Fame	Yellow
Pragathi	Progress	Red
Shakthi	Strength	Green

== Sports ==
=== Cricket ===
The Battle of the Seagulls is the annual Big Match played between St. Peter's College and St. Sebastian's College, Katuneriya; the inaugural encounter was held in 2012.
