= Hugo Fernando =

Sri Lankan actor (1912–1999)

Hugo Fernando හියුගෝ ප්‍රනාන්දු
- Born: Kanupulage Ugo Singho; July 14, 1912; Negombo, Sri Lanka
- Died: April 12, 1999 (aged 86)
- Other names: Hugo Master
- Education: Dalupotha Roman Catholic School
- Occupations: Actor, composer, lyricist, screenplay writer
- Years active: 1947-1997
- Spouse: Elizabeth Fernando (m. 1935)
- Children: 6
- Parents: Peduru Fernando (father); Liyanage Elizabeth Fernando (mother)

Kanupulage Ugo Singho (July 14, 1912 – April 12, 1999), popularly known as Hugo Master or Hugo Fernando, was an actor and composer of Sri Lankan cinema. Debuting in the first Sinhalese film Kadawunu Poronduwa, Fernando had an over 50-year career also as a lyricist, assistant director and music director.

== Personal life ==
Fernando was born on 14 July 1912 in Periyamulla, Negombo as the eldest of the family. His father was Peduru Fernando, who was famous for repairing village houses. His mother Liyanage Elizabeth Fernando was a housewife. He has one younger sister, Martha Mary Fernando. He attended Dalupotha Roman Catholic School but was forced to drop out in the seventh grade to support his poverty-stricken family. His father fell from a scaffolding and unable to move since then. Therefore his mother started to work in coir mill. He took to working at coir mills, estates, tobacco stores, fish stalls and in masonry to this end.

After stopping at the coir mill, he joined a group of fishermen in Kukulawa, Trincomalee, where he joined a fishing group at the village Alambala, 24 miles from Mullaitivu. After few months, he joined to a tobacco store in Hiriyale with a friend and worked as a cook. Later, he worked as a "kankanam" in a garden in Puttalam. During this period, he used to learn English and cookery from a Tamil teacher. He changed Ugo's name into "Hugo" due to famous French writer Victor Hugo, teacher's favorite. At the age of 16, Hugo went to work as an assistant mason.

He was married to Elizabeth Fernando in 1935. The couple has six children - eldest Bridget Malini, then son Nimal Anthony, daughter Lalitha, three sons Gamini Malcus, Sarath and Brito. Brito Fernando was a member of the Negombo Municipal Council for some time and currently works for the family of the missing in The Human Rights Council.

He died on 12 April 1999 at the age of 86.

== Cinema career ==
An encounter with Welgampola Malachias Perera, better known as "Malathias Master", led to Fernando joining the musician's orchestra as a mouth organ and mandolin player. His first play was broadcast on the 1934 radio station. He then joined the Minerva Theatre Group and wrote music for B. A. W. Jayamanne's play Awatharaya. Fernando contributed to the recording of Rukmani Devi and H. W. Rupasinghe's song Sri Buddha Gaya Vihare in 1939.

In 1947, Fernando took a triple role in the production of the first Sinhalese film Kadawunu Poronduwa, an adaption of Jayammanne's play. In addition to playing a role in the movie, he sang the song Sandyawe Shriya with Rukmani Devi and penned its songs such as Eddie Jayamanne's "Lapate Rupe Age". At the same time, Hugo joined the drama group of P. S. Kularatne's "Sirilak Limited". Hugo has been performed all over the country as the harmonium player of Shanthi Kumara Seneviratne's dance troupe. He then produced the play Gehenu Hitha, written by the Malathias Master.

Fernando worked extensively in the 1950s in such trades as assistant director on Banda Nagarayata Pemineema (1952) and Prema Tharangaya (1953), screenwriter on films like Puduma Leli (1953), Ahankara Sthree (1954), Mathalang (1955) and Duppathage Duka (1956) and music director and singer in Pitisara Kella (1953) and Saradiel (1954). He played the lead role for the first time in the film Prema Tharangaya as well as the songwriter. Additionally, he played major roles in many of these films. In 1954, five of his songs in the film Ahankara Sthree were popular.

Subsequently, Fernando has portrayed characters in such films as Sandesaya (1960), Dheewarayo (1964), Allapu Gedara (1965), Surekha, Sihasuna, Sahayata Danny (1974), Kawda Raja (1976), Chin Chin Nona (1977) and Hitha Honda Minihek (1975).

Fernando has been involved to introduce many new faces to Sinhala cinema, where they became the popular stars in the coming years. He trained Clarice de Silva as an actress and introduced Rohini Jayakody and Ravindra Rupasena to cinema with the film Ahankara Sthree. Then he introduced Anthony C. Perera through Duppathage Duka and Vijitha Mallika through Sooraya. He also introduced Thilakasiri Fernando and Jeevarani Kurukulasuriya to Lester James Peries. Popular actors, Anton Gregory, Bernard Reginald and Andrew Jayamanne entered cinema under the guidance of Hugo Fernando.

Hugo also worked as an assistant director in the film Vana Mohini.

== Filmography ==
Year	Film	Acting role	Other roles
1947	Kadawunu Poronduwa	Settiyar	Composer, Lyricist, Playback Singer
1952	Banda Nagarayata Peminima	Blind singer	Assistant Director, Lyricist
1953	Pitisara Kella		Music Supervisor
1953	Puduma Leli	Lata's father	Lyricist, Dialogue Writer
1953	Prema Tharangaya	Walpola Mudalali	Screenwriter, Lyricist, Playback Singer
1954	Saradiel	Music Arranger	
1954	Ahankara Sthree	Siamis Mudalali	Screenwriter, Lyricist, Assistant Director
1955	Matalan	Chitravali's father	
1956	Dosthara	Banda	Lyricist
1956	Duppathage Duka	Sethan	Lyricist
1956	Sooraya		Screenwriter
1957	Siriyalatha	Jurmis Perera	
1957	Soorasena		
1958	Sepali		Lyricist
1958	Wana Mohini		Screenwriter
1960	Sandesaya	Vithana Rala	
1960	Veera Vijaya		Screenwriter
1963	Adata Vediya Heta Hondai	Gabriel 'Mudalali'	Screenwriter
1964	Dheewarayo		Screenwriter
1965	Chandiya	Appuhamy	Screenwriter
1965	La Dalu		
1965	Allapu Gedara	Visharada 'Master'	Screenwriter
1966	Oba Dutu Da		
1967	Rena Giraw	Virindu singer	
1967	Sura Chauraya		
1968	Ruhunu Kumari		Screenwriter, Lyricist
1968	Amathikama		
1968	Ataweni Pudumaya		Dialogue Writer
1969	Mee Masso		
1969	Pancha		
1970	Thevetha		
1970	Suli Sulang		Screenwriter
1970	Dan Mathakada	Caretaker	
1970	Ohoma Hondada		
1972	Singapore Charlie		
1974	Sagarika		
1974	Sahayata Danny		
1974	Surekha		
1974	Sihasuna		
1975	Hitha Honda Minihek	Master	
1975	Suraya Surayamai	Martin Appuhamy 'Daddy'	
1975	Kokilayo		
1975	Rajagedara Paraviyo		
1976	Ganga		
1976	Unnath Dahai Malath Dahai		
1976	Mangala		
1976	Kawuda Raja	Loku Hamu 'Daddy'	
1976	Hariyata Hari	Mudalali	Dialogue Writer
1977	Chin Chin Nona		
1977	Maruwa Samaga Wase	Mudalali	
1978	Apsara		
1978	Deepanjali		
1979	Muwan Palessa	Arachhila	
1980	Hondin Inna		
1980	Seetha		
1980	Muwan Palessa 2	Korale Mahathaya	
1980	Kinduru Kumari	Gurunnanse	
1981	Kolamkarayo	Club owner	
1982	Thakkita Tharikita		
1982	Kadawunu Poronduwa remake		
1983	Muwan Palessa 3	Arachhila	
1983	Sandamali	Mudalali	
1983	Hithath Hondai Wadath Hondai		
1984	Mala Giravi	Meena's Appa	
1984	Kekille Rajjuruwo		
1986	Yali Hamuwennai	Priyanthi's father	
1987	Kele Kella	Mudalali	
1987	Obatai Priye Adare	Johnny	
1988	Chandingeth Chandiya		
1989	Waradata Danduwama		Lyricist
1990	Jaya Kothanada		
1991	Cheriyo Doctor	Patient	
1991	Alibaba Saha Horu Hathaliha		Dialogue Writer
1992	Sinha Raja		
1992	Okkoma Kanapita		
1992	Muwan Palesse Kadira		
1992	Sakkara Suththara		
1994	Okkoma Hondatai		
1995	Cheriyo Captain	Party goer	
1996	Sathi		
