= Kadawunu Poronduwa (1982 film) =

- Directed by: Roy de Silva
- Written by: B. A. W. Jayamanne (story)
- Produced by: Sumana Amarasinghe
- Starring: Vijaya Kumaratunga; Sumana Amarasinghe
- Edited by: Kalinga De Silva
- Music by: Sarath Dassanayake
- Release date: 1982
- Language: Sinhala

Kadawunu Poronduwa is a 1982 Sinhala drama film directed by Roy de Silva and produced by his wife Sumana Amarasinghe. It is a remake of the first Sinhala film Kadawunu Poronduwa. The film stars Vijaya Kumaratunga and Sumana Amarasinghe in lead roles with Eddie Jayamanne, Joe Abeywickrama and Ruby de Mel in supportive roles. It also marks the film debut of comedian Sunil Hettiarachchi, as well as final appearance of Eddie Jayamanne in cinema.

== Reception ==
The film received generally positive reviews and was the most popular film of 1982 in Sri Lanka. For the latter accomplishment, it was presented with a presidential award.

== Cast ==
- Vijaya Kumaranatunga as Samson
- Sumana Amarasinghe as Ranjani
- Eddie Jayamanne as Manappuwa
- Joe Abeywickrama as Hemapala
- Ruby de Mel as Jayasena Hamine
- Mabel Blythe as Josy Baba
- Sonia Disa as Tekla
- Victor Wickramage as Victor Moragoda
- Henry Jayasena
- Wijeratne Warakagoda as Psych ward nurse
- Freddie Silva as Sewaris 'Unnah'
- Don Sirisena as Tamil Priest
- Lilian Edirisinghe as Debtor
- B. S. Perera as Mudalali
- Sunil Hettiarachchi as Simio
- Gemini Kantha as Song performer
- Eddie Junior as Sinhala debtor

== Soundtrack ==
The movie features songs sung by Rukmani Devi (from the original film), Latha Walpola, Stanley Mallawarachchi, Victor Ratnayake, Neela Wickramasinghe, Eddie Jayamanne (from the original film) and Sujatha Attanayake.
