= Maris Stella College =

Catholic college in Sri Lanka

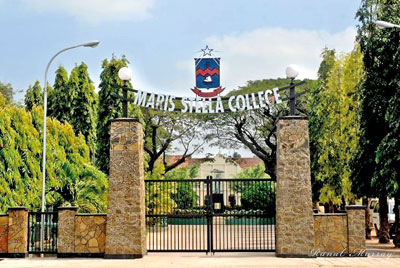
- College Main Gate

Location
- Negombo Road; Negombo; Sri Lanka; 7.213923°N 79.848915°E

Information
- Former name: St Mary's College (1918-1922)
- Type: Semi Government
- Motto: Latin: Iter para tutum (Show us the way)
- Religious affiliation: Roman Catholic
- Established: 1922; 104 years ago
- Principal: Sunanda Alwis
- Age: 5 to 19
- Enrollment: 1,657 (2017-2018)
- Language: Sinhala, English, Tamil
- Colors: Red and blue
- Alumni: Maristonians
- Website: marisstellacollegenegombo.com

Maris Stella College is a Catholic College in Negombo, Sri Lanka, which was founded by the Marist Brothers in 1922.

== History ==
In 1918, four Marist Brothers came to Negombo, Sri Lanka, and took over the management of St Mary's College. In 1922, the school moved to its present site and assumed the new name of Maris Stella College. The history of the primary school goes back to 1921, when Bro. Lewis was in charge of the elementary school, Standard Two Elementary School Leaving Certificate classes. There were three long cadjan sheds which housed eight primary classes.

The school's broadcasting services were inaugurated in 1930. Maris Stella installed a wireless set in the library, and the boys followed lessons, such as nature talks to children. Electricity came to the whole of Negombo in 1931. The same year, the first Corpus Christi procession took place, which went around the quadrangle. The cadets presented a Royal Guard of Honour.

In August 1939, World War II broke out. The following year, the school was requisitioned in part by the Royal Artillery for their headquarters. The primary school shifted to the Tammita Church grounds into temporary cadjan sheds. Then Royal Artillery moved out in November, but the Royal Air Force occupied the buildings in March the following year. The college was put under the protection of Our Lady of Perpetual Help. There were frequent practices of air raid precautions in schools. Trenches were dug for shelter, and every child knew what to do in case of an air raid warning. The school was in Easter holidays when the Japanese air raid took place in 1942, but their invasion fleet was turned back.

In the meantime, a three-quarter-acre block of land behind Maris Stella was purchased and twelve classrooms, a staff room, and a principal's office were built; the primary school moved back from Tammita. When Nazier went to Europe in 1950, for a year's study leave, Leonard Obris acted as principal of the Primary Department. For many years, the Primary Department was in temporary cadjan sheds. So a building project was launched. Funds were raised through carnivals and other means. Bro. Xavier was the architect and the builder of the primary school. In June 1959, Gerard Peiris became the next principal of Maris Stella Primary School.

Maris Stella Primary School had been going on for years as a separate third-grade aided school recognised by the Government with separate tutorial staff and annual returns. When the Government took over all the third-grade schools, Maris Stella Primary School, together with the primary schools of many leading Christian schools came under this category. This position was contested and the Government gave back the primary schools after some time, now to be recognised only as a section of the upper school under a principal and to be continued as a non-fee levying school.

It was during Peiris's tenure as principal of the primary school that the change took place. After serving the college from 1959 to 1965, he was transferred to Christ King College at Tudella, another Maris Institution. Joseph Fonseka, Ephrem Obris, Joseph Fonseka, Shanthi Liyanage, Dela Soysa, and Remigius Fernando succeeded Gerard Peiris.

On 18 June 2022, Maris Stella College, Negombo, marked its centennial anniversary with a holy mass presided by Cardinal Malcolm Ranjith (Archbishop of the Archdiocese of Colombo).

== Principals ==
Time Period	Name Of The Principal
1922 - 1926	Lewis Gervaise
1926 - 1926	Bro. Joseph
1927 - 1949	Anthony Pigenwall
1949 - 1956	Bro. Conran
1956 - 1959	Stanislaus Gunawardana
1960 - 1966	Peter Wijethunga
1966 - 1979	Gregory Appuhamy
1979 - 1989	P. R. Clinton Perera
1990 - 1995	A. D. A. Shanthi Liyanage
1996 - 2001	K. A. Godfrey Edward Perera
2002 - 2004	P. R. Clinton Perera
2004 - 2007	M. L. Sunanda Alwis
2007 - 2010	B. P. R. Mervin Perera
2010 - 2017	M. L. Sunanda Alwis
2017 - 2018	Chinthana Nonis
2018 - 2021	Michael De Waas
2021–present	M. L. Sunanda Alwis

== Notable alumni ==
Name	Year/degree	Notability	Ref.
Carlo Fonseka		Professor of Physiology, President Sri Lanka Medical Council (2012-2017)	
A. N. S. Kulasinghe		Civil engineer, Founding chairman State Engineering Corporation of Ceylon (1962-1971)	
J. F. A. Soza		Supreme Court judge (1982–1984)	
Graeme Labrooy		International Cricketer (1986-1991)	
Wijayapala Mendis		Mayor of Negombo (1954); Member of Parliament - Katana (1960-1970, 1975–1989), Gampaha (1989-2000); Minister of Textile Industries; Minister of Transport and Highways; Leader of the House; Chief Opposition Whip	
Sunil Mihindukula		Journalist, author (1960–2017)	
Jeyaraj Fernandopulle		Member of Parliament - Gampaha (1989-2008), Ministry of Highways, Ports & Shipping (2005-2008)	
Ranjan Ramanayake		Actor, Member of Parliament - Ratnapura (2010-2015), Gampaha (2015-present)	
Dasun Shanaka		International Cricketer / former Captain of Sri Lanka Cricket ODI and T20I teams(2015–present)	
Dushmantha Chameera		International Cricketer (2015–present)	
Ashan Dias		Actor, TV Host (2008–present)	
