= Gemini Kantha =

Sri Lankan actress and comedian (1925-1992)

Jemini Kantha
- ජෙමිනි කාන්තා
- Born: Nona Yuhan Sheriffdeen; 20 February 1925; Matale, Sri Lanka
- Died: 22 June 1992 (aged 67); Rome, Italy
- Other name: Jemini Kantha
- Occupation: Actress
- Years active: 1947–1954

Nona Yuhan Sheriffdeen (born 20 February 1925 – died 22 June 1992 as ජෙමිනි කාන්තා [Sinhala]), popularly known by the stage name Jemini Kantha, was an actress in Sri Lankan cinema. One of the earliest pillars of Sinhala cinema, Kantha is considered the first female comedian in Sinhala cinema. She was a pioneer comedy actress known as "Josi Baba" and singer in early Sri Lankan cinema.

== Personal life ==
Gemini Kantha was born on 20 February 1925 in Meewakkumbura village in Matale to a Malay father.

== Career ==
After her school finished, Kantha joined the B. A. W. Jayamanne's Minerva Drama Group. She won a reputation as a singer who sang for the discs during the Gramophone era along with Eddie Jayamanne, Mohideen Baig and A.M.U Raj. She became the first comic actress in Sri Lankan cinema with the role of "Josi baba" in Sri Lanka's first film Kadawunu Poronduwa in 1947. She also sang the song Nonage Ale Ge Meda Sale with Eddie Jayamanne. During her time in cinema, the Dominion of Ceylon, which was then the country's name, stated, in a report by its Ministry of Information, that she was one of a trio, alongside Rukmani Devi and Eddie Jayamanne, who had "almost a monopoly on" Sinalese film.

She acted in only seven films in a short span of 8 years. She quit cinema after having her first child. She also starred in Bennett Rathnayake's teledrama Tharu, which was her last appearance in career.

She moved to Italy in 1990 to be with her three children who had moved there, and died in Rome in June 1992.

== Filmography ==
| Year | Film | Role | Ref. |
|---|---|---|---|
| 1947 | Kadawunu Poronduwa | Josi baba | |
| 1948 | Kapati Arakshakaya | Supina | |
| 1948 | Weradunu Kurumanama | Maria | |
| 1949 | Peralena Iranama | Pabi Nona | |
| 1953 | Prema Tharagaya | Podihamy | |
| 1953 | Sujatha | Emily | |
| 1954 | Warada Kageda | | |
| 1982 | Kadawunu Poronduwa remake | Song Performer | |
