= Peralena Iranama =

1949 film

Peralena Iranama පෙරළෙන ඉරණම
- Directed by: Jyotish Sinha
- Written by: B. A. W. Jayamanne
- Produced by: Jyotish Sinha
- Starring: Rukmani Devi; Aruna Shanthi; Eddie Jayamanne; Gemini Kantha
- Music by: B.S Perera
- Release date: 20 October 1949
- Country: Sri Lanka
- Language: Sinhala

Peralena Iranama (Sinhala: පෙරළෙන ඉරණම) is a 1949 Sri Lankan Sinhala language film which was directed by Jyotish Sinha and written by B. A. W. Jayamanne. It is considered one of the finest Sri Lankan films of the 1940s and was the last Sinhala film to be released in the 1940s. The film was released on the 20th of October 1949 through the Ceylon Theatre circuits.

== Cast ==
- Rukmani Devi as Sunetha
- Aruna Shanthi as Upali
- Eddie Jayamanne as Paucha
- Gemini Kantha as Pabi Nona
- Mark Samaranayake as Dushta Samiye

== Songs ==
The film consists of 3 songs.

- Hada Aadara Preme
- Olu Malehi Sudo
- Paapey Mey Jeevithe

== See also ==
- List of Sri Lankan films of the 1940s
