= Kadawunu Poronduwa =

- Rukmani Devi in a scene
- Directed by: Jyotish Sinha
- Screenplay by: B. A. W. Jayamanne
- Story by: B. A. W. Jayamanne
- Produced by: Chitrakala Movietone Ltd & S.D.T.Appuhami
- Starring: Rukmani Devi; B. A. W. Jayamanne; Peter Peiris; Hugo Fernando; Eddie Jayamanne; Gemini Kantha
- Cinematography: K Prabhakar
- Edited by: Pakeer Saleh
- Music by: Narayana Aiyar
- Distributed by: Minerva Group
- Release date: 21 January 1947
- Country: Sri Lanka
- Language: Sinhala

Kadawunu Poronduwa (Sinhala: කඩවුනු පොරොන්දුව, "The Broken Promise") was the first film to be made in the Sinhala language; it is generally considered to have heralded the coming of Sinhala Cinema. The film was produced and filmed in India however, and was highly influenced by South Indian melodrama. It was first shown on January 21, 1947, at the Kingsley Cinema in Colombo, Sri Lanka.

A remake was released in 1982.

== Plot ==
Ralahamy, a man of high status, dies leaving his family in debt after having squandered his fortune through extensive drinking and other vices. To get back into wealth, Ralahamy's widow Tackla pushes their daughter Ranjani to marry Victor, a wealthy older man with a child from an earlier marriage. In this process, Samson, Ranjani's boyfriend, who had tried extensively to get the family back into good graces going so far as to pay off their debts, is spurned. He then goes abroad to win a fortune.

When Samson returns he learns of Ranjani's engagement to Victor and tries to reach her through letters. His letters are hidden from her however, and rumours spread that Samson is now a cripple. Ultimately the truth is revealed.

== Cast ==
- Rukmani Devi as Ranjani: A high-class girl who is pushed into a marriage with an older man and forced to reject her boyfriend.
- Gemini Kantha as Jossie: village woman; love interest of Manappuwa
- Rupa Devi as Tackla: Ranjani's mother
- Miriam Jayamanne as Hilda
- Eddie Jayamanne as Manappuwa: naive village simpleton; comic relief
- B. A. W. Jayamanne as Samson: Ranjani's love interest; wants financial success for her family but is spurned by the mother
- Peter Peiris as Victor: old wealthy man with whom Ranjani is forcibly engaged
- Stanley Mallawarachchi as Hemapala
- D. T. Perera as Jayasena
- Asilyn Balasooriya as Sumana
- J. B. Perera as Harmahana
- Hugo Fernando as doctor
- Suriya Rani as Aaya
- Sina Pishpani as Narsi
- Wida Soyza
- S. S. Ponnisena

== Production ==
Kadawunu Poronduwa was produced by S. M. Nayagam, a pioneer of Sinhala film industry and an Indian citizen. He had to ferry the entire cast to Madurai India for filming and production.Minarwa group also became a part of this production while S.D.T.Appuhami, the brother in law of B. A.W Jayamanna and Eddie Jayamanna has also invested money for the movie production,

It began as a successful play for dramatist B. A. W. Jayamanne. In 1947 he filmed and processed the movie in South India.

Kadawunu Poronduwa produced a formula that Sinhala films would follow up through the 1960s; Jayamanne describes the formula as such:

The duration of a film had to be two and a half hours. One hour of this had to be given to scenes with dialogue. Half an hour to songs (about ten), another half-hour given to silent background scenes, with an interval of fifteen minutes.

== Songs ==
- "Sri Jaya Vijaya" – Minerva Singing Group
- "Prema Daya" – Rukmani Devi
- "Lapati Rupe Age" – Eddie Jayamanne (the original gramophone record label was incorrectly printed as "Eddie jayanamme and Jemini Kantha")
- "Deva Swarmi" – Rukmani Devi
- "Sandyawe Sriya Ramya Lesa Pena" – Rukmani Devi and Hugo Fernando - for film / Rukmani Devi and Stanley Mallawarachchi - for gramophone record only
- "Is Issara Welaa" – Eddie Jayamanne and Jemini Kantha
- "Mage Saka Bambarea" – Eddie Jayamanne and Jemini Kantha
- "Thakkita Tharikita" – Eddie Jayamanne and Jemini Kantha
- "Jevithaye Saamey" – Rukmani Devi
- "Yaami Indiya Desataa" – Rukmani Devi
- "Sundari Rupa Rajini" – Stanley Mallawarachchi and Peter Peries
- "Papi Shayapi Do" – Rukmani Devi and Hugo Fernando / Stanley Mallawarachchi

Songs of Kadawunu Poronduwa were issued by Parlophone gramophone records with the film release in 1947. They were the last records issued by the Palophone label in Sri Lanka. (Note: The last two songs listed, "Sundari Rupa Rajin" and "Papi Shayapi Do", were not distributed on gramophone records, rendering them difficult to find.)

== See also ==
- List of Sri Lankan films
