= B. A. W. Jayamanne =

Sri Lankan actor, director and producer

B.A.W. Jayamanne
- Born: Bernard Aloysius Wanniarachchi Jayamanne; May 2, 1908; Negombo, Sri Lanka
- Died: February 16, 1965 (aged 56)
- Occupations: Playwright, director, producer, actor
- Spouse: Grays Jayamanne (nee:Peiris)
- Children: Judith Premalatha (Daughter) Bernadette Mallika (Daughter) Magdaleen Swineetha (Daughter) Sriyalatha (Daughter) Chritopher Gamini (Son)
- Father: W. Don Thomas
- Relatives: Eddie Jayamanne (Brother) Rukmani Devi (Sister-in-Law)

Bernard Aloysius Wanniarachchi Jayamanne who was better known as B.A.W. Jayamanne (20 May 1908 – 16 February 1965: as බී.ඒ.ඩබ්ලිව්. ජයමාන්න) was a Sri Lankan playwright, director, producer and actor. He played a major role in the making of the first Sinhala film Kadawunu Poronduwa in 1947; Jayamanne achieved a level of popularity as a director with movies starring Rukmani Devi and Eddie Jayamanne in the 1950s.

== Personal life ==
Aloy was born on 2 May 1908 in Periyamulla, Negombo to W. Don Thomas, a teacher at Maris Stella College. He along with younger brother Eddie formed the Minerva theater group in the 1930s and achieved some fame running plays that depicted contemporary middle class and village situations in contrast to the Tower Hall plays popular at the time which featured archaic tales of Sri Lankan kings. The Minerva dramas usually featured Rukmani Devi, Eddie and Jemini Kantha in the lead roles.

Aloy died on February 16, 1965, while making the film Magul Poruwa. It was completed by S. Ramanathan.

== Cinema career ==
Around 1947, Aloy was approached by South Indian producer S. M. Nayagam to turn his popular play Kadawunu Poronduwa into a movie. Nayagam had noted its popularity and concluded that it would be a fairly viable investment. Although having misgivings initially, Aloy relented and the film was produced and released to commercial success in April 1947.

Aloy subsequently oversaw the adaption of a couple of his other plays before trying his hand at directing with Hadisi Vinischaya (with Mabel Blythe taking over for Jemini Kantha) in 1949. Due to the infancy of the film industry, BAW managed to dominate box office with minimal competition over the following years. Sangawunu Pilithura was released in 1951 and Umathu Wishwasaya in 1952.

Aloy had one of his biggest hits with Kele Handa in 1953; it made Sri Lankan film history as the first direct literary adaption and introduced actress Rita Ratnayake. His subsequent films include Iranganie (1954), Mathabedaya (1955, introducing actress Ruby de Mel), Daiva Vipakaya (1956), Wanaliya (1958), Hadisi Vivahaya (1959), Kawata Andare (1960), Jeewithe Pujawe (1961), Mangalika (1963) and Magul Poruwa (1967).

== Filmography ==
=== As an actor ===
Year	Film	Acting role	Other roles
1947	Kadawunu Poronduwa	Samson	Screenwriter
1948	Kapati Arakshakaya	Elder father	Screenwriter
1948	Weradunu Kurumanama		Screenwriter
1949	Hadisi Vinischaya	Siripala	Screenwriter
1950	Peralena Iranama		Screenwriter
1951	Sengawunu Pilithura	Kusumalata's father	Screenwriter
1954	Iranganie	Ariyadasa	Screenwriter
1955	Mathabhedaya	Ralahamy	
1956	Daiva Vipakaya	Wiloris Batugoda	

=== As a director ===
Year	Film	Other roles
1950	Hadisi Vinischaya	Producer
1951	Sengawunu Pilithura	
1952	Umathu Vishwasaya	
1953	Kele Handa	Producer
1954	Iranganie	Producer
1955	Mathabhedaya	Producer
1956	Daiva Vipakaya	Producer
1958	Wana Liya	
1969	Hadisi Vivahaya	
1960	Kawata Andare	Producer
1961	Jeewitha Poojawa	
1963	Mangalika	
1967	Magul Poruwa	
