= Eddie Jayamanne =

Sri Lankan comedian and actor

Eddie Jayamanne එඩී ජයමාන්න
- Born: Wanniaarachchige Don David Victor Jayamanne; 15 February 1915; Negombo, Sri Lanka
- Died: 25 July 1981 (aged 66); Palliyawaththa, Handala
- Resting place: Manyokhena Cemetery, Negombo
- Education: St. Peter's College, Negombo; Maris Stella College
- Occupations: Actor, comedian
- Years active: 1947-1983
- Known for: cinema acting
- Spouse: Rukmani Devi (1943-1978)
- Father: W. Don Thomas
- Relatives: B. A. W. Jayamanne (brother); Grace Jayamanne (brother in law)

Wanniaarachchige Don David Victor Jayamanne, MBE (15 February 1915 – 25 July 1981), popularly known as Eddie Jayamanne was a popular Sri Lankan comedian and actor of early Sri Lankan cinema.

== Early life ==
He was born on 15 February 1915 in Periyamulla, Negambo to a Christian family as the youngest of the family with seven siblings. His father, W. Don Thomas, was a teacher at Maris Stella College. He was educated at the Cross College of Negombo, St. Peter's College, Negombo, St. Mary's College, Negombo and Maris Stella College. His elder brother B. A. W. Jayamanne was a renowned filmmaker and producer.

Eddie married fellow Minerva troupe player Rukmani Devi after falling in love through their involvement in the same plays. Devi's parents challenged their engagement in court but they were allowed to go through with their marriage.

== Cinema career ==
Eddie with his brother B. A. W. Jayamanne formed the Minerva theater troupe in the 1930s. They successfully staged plays in which naive Ceylonese characters would ape Western ways to comical results, merging South Indian theatre with Western drama. Eddie, a frequent star of these comedies, became a popular theater actor in the years leading up to the development of Sri Lankan cinema.

In 1947, South Indian producer S. M. Nayagam became interested in producing a Sri Lankan film. He contacted B. A. W. Jayamanne and secured the rights to one of his plays called Kadawunu Poronduwa. Eddie would be one of the stars in this film adaption in the role of the village simpleton "Manappuwa" alongside Jemini Kantha as Josi Baba. As the first film to feature Sinhalese dialogue, the film found approval with audiences and was a huge success.

The Jayamanne brothers followed the success of the film with several other play adaptions i.e. Hadisi Vinishchaya (1949), Sengawunu Pilithura (1951) and Umathu Wishwasaya (1952). Mabel Blythe joined the cast with Hadisi Vinishchaya. In 1953 the brothers adapted a book into film for the first time in Sri Lankan cinema (Kele Handa). Their subsequent films include Iranganie (1954), Matha Bedhaya (1955), Perakadoru Bena (1955), Daiwa Wipaakaya (1956), Vanaliya (1958), Kawata Andare (1960) and Mangalika (1963).

Eddie's work not related to his brother's productions include playing a musician in Sandesaya (1960) and the brother of a village simpleton who discovers a jewel and becomes rich in Kolomba Sanniya (1976). He reprised his role as Manappuwa in a remake of Kadawunu Poronduwa released in 1982.

He was appointed a Member of the Order of the British Empire (MBE) in 1954 Birthday Honours.

Rukmani Devi died in a road accident near St. Mary's Church, Thudella, on October 28, 1978.

== Death ==
On 25 July 1981, Eddie died from a heart attack. During his last days, he was residing in 172, Palliyawaththa, Handala. His death was reported by a neighbor, P.K. Piyadasa. He was buried in "Manyokhena" Cemetery in Negombo.

== Filmography ==
Year	Film	Role	Ref.
1947	Kadawunu Poronduwa	Manappuwa	
1948	Kapati Arakshakaya	Jacob	
1948	Weradunu Kurumanama	Babaiyya	
1949	Peralena Iranama	Paucha	
1950	Hadisi Vinischaya	Kokila	
1951	Sengawunu Pilithura	Manappuwa	
1952	Upathu Viswashaya	Saping	
1953	Kele Handa	Aanda	
1954	Iranganie	Somapala	
1955	Mathabhedaya	William	
1955	Perakadoru Bena	Gunathilaka Ralahamy	
1956	Dosthara	Doctor	
1957	Siriyalatha	Kurunis	
1957	Soorasena	441	
1959	Daivayogaya	Dantha	
1960	Sandesaya	Mamma	
1960	Nalangana	Sunil's friend	
1960	Kawata Andare	Andare	
1961	Gan Thera		
1963	Mangalika		
1963	Mangalika		
1964	Semiya Birindage Deviyaya		
1965	Sathutai Kandului		
1966	Sampatha		
1966	Senasili Suwaya	Kavinda	
1967	Sarana		
1967	Magul Poruwa		
1967	Rena Giraw	Club goer	
1968	Abudasse Kale		
1968	Radhapura	Lal	
1968	Dehadaka Duka	Alankari	
1969	Paara Walalu		
1971	Kalana Mithuro		
1971	Samanala Kumariyo		
1972	Hathara Wate	Gunadasa	
1973	Hondama Welawa		
1973	Hondai Narakai		
1973	Hondata Hondai	Uncle	
1974	Duleeka	Jayawardena	
1974	Susee	Bastian	
1974	Duppathage Hithawatha	Jimmy	
1975	Hitha Honda Minihek	Eddie Jayamanne	
1975	Lassana Kella		
1975	Lassana Dawasak	Eddie, Nilanthi's father	
1976	Nayana		
1976	Haratha Hathara		
1976	Unnath Dahai Malath Dahai		
1976	Onna Mame Kella Penapi		
1976	Adarei Man Adarei		
1976	Ran Thilaka		
1976	Kolamba Sanniya	Jacolis	
1977	Hithuwoth Hithuwamai	Sergeant Banda	
1977	Deviyani Oba Kohida	Juwan 'Aiyya'	
1977	Eya Dan Loku Lamayek	Mama	
1977	Honda Hitha		
1977	Yali Ipade		
1978	Saara	Charlie	
1978	Apsara		
1978	Sithaka Suwanda	Mr. Samson	
1978	Sally		
1979	Samanmalee	Father	
1979	Jeewana Kandulu		
1979	Subhani		
1980	Uthumaneni		
1980	Anuhasa		
1980	Sankhapali	Sanka's father	
1981	Kolankarayo	Kathru Mahaththaya	
1981	Thavalama		
1982	Sithara		
1982	Kadawunu Poronduwa remake	Manappuwa	
1983	Sandamali	Sandamali's father	
1983	Yali Pipunu Malak		

== Songs ==
- Thakkita Tharikita Udapana Natanna Hithuna (With Jemini Kanth)
- Kolompure Shriya
