= Rukmani Devi =

Sri Lankan actress and singer (1923–1978)

Rukmani Devi රුක්මණී දේවී
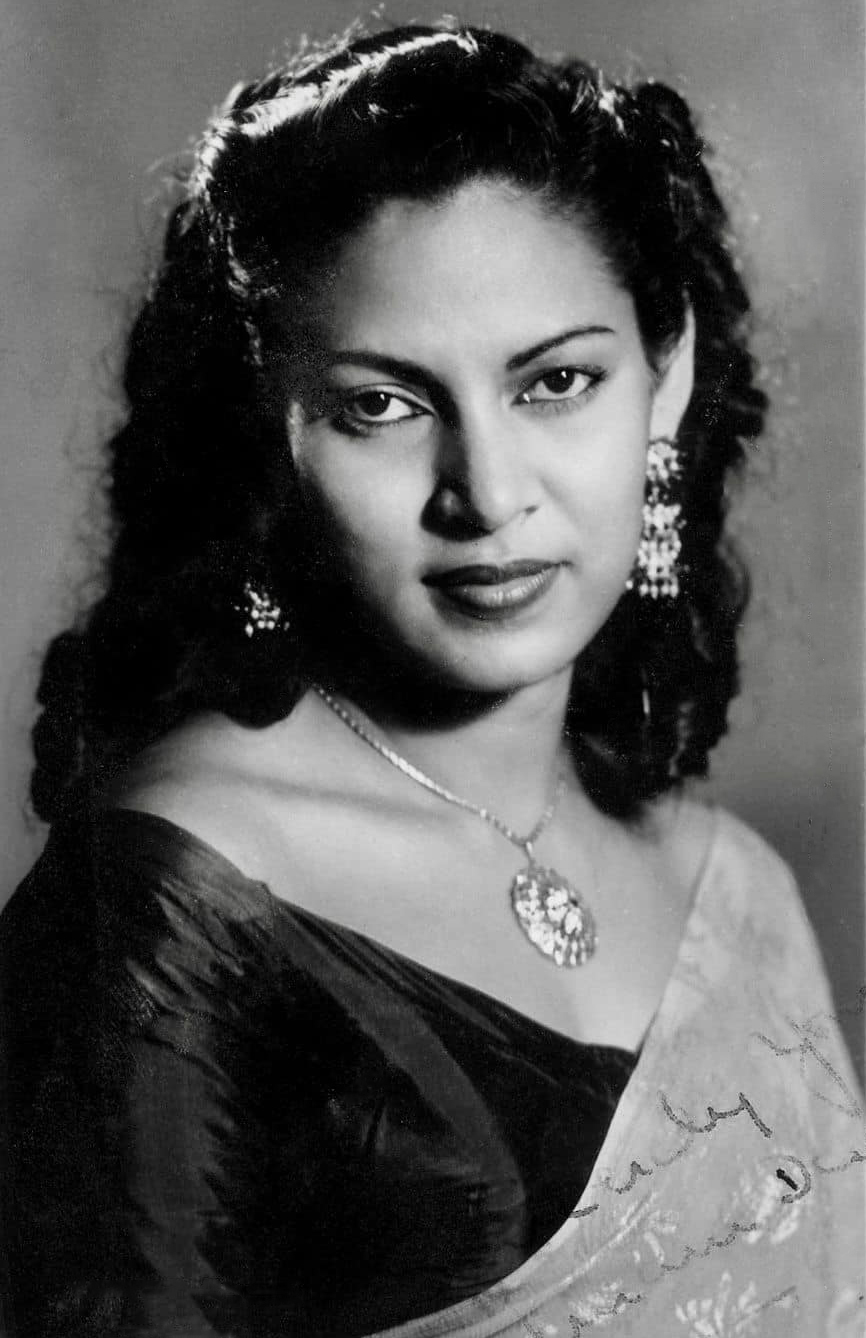
- Born: Daisy Rasammah Daniels; 15 January 1923; Nuwara Eliya, Sri Lanka
- Died: 28 October 1978 (aged 55); Ja-Ela, Thudella, Sri Lanka
- Resting place: Manyokahena Cemetery, Negombo
- Occupations: Singer and actress
- Years active: 1936–1978
- Spouse: Eddie Jayamanne (m. 1943)
- Relatives: www.rukmanidevisrilanka.org

Daisy Rasammah Daniels, known popularly as Rukmani Devi (15 January 1923 – 28 October 1978: Sinhala: රුක්මණී දේවී) was a Sri Lankan film actress and singer who was often acclaimed as "The Nightingale of Sri Lanka". She made it to the silver screen via the stage and had acted in nearly 100 films at the time of her death. Having a passion for singing and a melodious voice, she was Sri Lanka's foremost female singer in the gramophone era. She was posthumously awarded the Sarasaviya 'Rana Thisara'- Life Time Achievement Award at the 1979 Sarasaviya Awards Festival.

== Personal life ==
Rukmani Devi was born as Daisy Rasammah Daniels to a Tamil Colombo Chetty Christian family on January 15, 1923, at Ramboda in Nuwara Eliya, Sri Lanka. She was the second child, in a family of five; her father, John Daniel, worked on a plantation, and her mother, Helen Rose, was a teacher. She grew up in Colombo and had her early education at St. Matthew's School and then moved on to St. Clare's School, Wellawatte.

She was married to veteran dramatist, actor, and singer Eddie Jayamanne, whom she fell in love with as a result of her close association with him when performing in dramas produced by "Minerva Dramatic Club," founded by B. A. W. Jayamanne. They lived at "Jaya Ruk," at Angurukaramulla, Negombo.

== Career ==
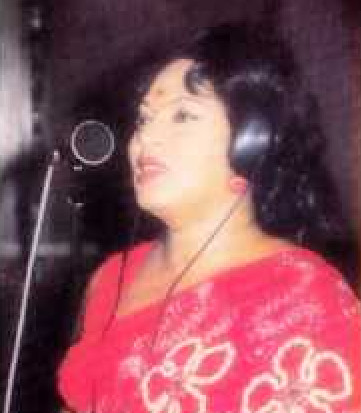
Rukmani Devi sings before a public audience at Dewalapola in May 1976.

As a little girl, Daniels showed an inborn talent to sing and dance. At the age of seven, she was picked to sing Christmas carols. Impressed with her ability to sing, dance, and also act, she was selected to perform a main role in a Christmas play, 'The Shoemaker's Wife'. The stage play was trained and presented by St. Clare's School, Wellawatte. Watching her play this role much enthusiastically, Walter Abeysinghe, a drama producer, sought permission from her father to invite her to play the lead role of 'Sita' in his drama 'Ramayanaya.' Thus, in 1935, at the age of just 12 years, she performed in this stage play, presented by the 'Sinhala Natya Sabha'.

This marked the beginning of an illustrious career that would span over four decades. As her performances were highly appreciated by the packed audience, well-known dramatist Dick Dias chose her for two of his stage plays, "Jana Kiharanaya" and "Mayawathie". She was now flooded with stage dramas, as she became Mayawathi in Charles Dias' 'Mayawathi', Juliet in a Sinhala adaptation of Romeo and Juliet, playing the lead female role in all of them. Rukmani performed her singing career as a simple singer on Sri Lankan radio in the mid-1940s.

Gabriel Gunaratne, who was in charge of recording songs at the His Master's Voice label, was the permanent music director of the company. She was introduced to H. W. Rupasinghe one day in October 1938 by Gunaratne. Rupasinghe, who saw Rukmani's singing prowess, chose her for the first album, which was launched by His Master's Voice as No. 9300. With her first audio recording of the famous song "Siri Buddhagaya Vihare" with Master "H. W. Rupasinghe". in 1938 at the age of 15, she captured the hearts of the masses, and her career evolved from that of an actress to that of an actress turned singer. This song was recorded for the 78 rpm (gramophone) record label His Master's Voice with the number N-9300 and issued in 1939 by Cargills Ltd., local agents for His Master's Voice.

Her unique voice attracted many music directors as her singing career moved from the stage to the silver screen. Joining Rupasinghe Master's band as a regular singer, she faced three challenges at the time. That is, she had not studied Hindustani classical music properly and had to compete with renowned singers of that year such as Lakshmi Bai, Annie Boteju, and Susila Jayasinghe. The third was the language challenge. She did not know how to read or write Sinhala, and she used to write it all down in English. Due to the vocal training given by Rupasinghe Master through those songs, she soon became a simple classical singer as well as the most popular young singer for this His Master's Voice label. During 1938–45, she recorded 44 songs for His Master's Voice. Rukmani sang almost all the Sinhala songs composed in Hindi and Vanga classical songs sung by Kumari Jutika Roy, then popularly known as "Bhajan Songstress" in India.

It was also around this time that her name underwent a change from Daisy Daniels to the well-known 'Rukmani Devi'. There are two schools of thought as to how the name "Rukmani Devi" originated. According to one school, the late H. W. Rupasinghe maestro created the name, while others believe that Jayantha Weerasekara and Michael Sannas Liyanage, who are in their 90s, created it. Entering the stage, Rukmani had the opportunity to perform in Noorthi dramas such as Janakiharanaya, Rohini and Mayawathi. Since 1940, B. A. W. Jayamanne, founder of "Minerva Dramatic Club" of Negombo has taken Rukmani to perform remarkable roles in his dramas, such as 'Apparition', 'Broken Promise', 'Changing Fate, 'Defeated Aim', 'Evasive Denial', 'Fanatic Faith', 'Grisly Guardian', 'Hasty Decision', and lastly, 'Irangani'. The above-mentioned plays followed the English alphabet.

The popular play 'Broken Promise' (Kadawunu Poronduwa) was adapted into a film by B. A. W. Jayamanne. This was the first Sinhala film, Kadawunu Poronduwa, screened on January 21, 1947. Rukmani Devi, who also began her film career through the role of 'Ranjani' in this film, also became the first local cinema actress. Her film career, which thus began, spread over a period of more than three decades. According to Sri Lankeya Cinema Vanshaya (pp. 637–638), written by Nuwan Nayanajith Kumara, from Kadawunu Poronduwa in 1947 to Ara Soyza in 1984, Rukmani Devi had played different roles in 99 films, up to the time of her death. Rukmani Devi won first place in the "Popular Singing Series" in the 1953 Radio Artists Classification Test.

Some of the songs she sang for films are Sandyave Sriya for 'Kadawunu Poronduwa', Pinsara Mage Soyura for 'Kapati Arakshakaya', Gala Kandeni, and Moranawa Preme Hade for 'Weradun Kurumanama', Nindede Rathri Yahane for 'Peralena Iranama', Mavila Pena vi Rupe for 'Kela Handa', Pem Sihina Loke Maya for 'Mathabhedaya', Melavi Yanna Hada Mage for 'Daiva Yogaya', Suva dena Sita Sanasum for 'Ladalu' and Doi Doi Puta for 'Ahasin Polavata'. In 1975, Rukmani sang "Pem Rajatahane" with Milton Mallawarachchi. Rukmani has made duets with amateur singers since the 1960s, such as "Ada Handapana Paya Hari Lassanai" with Sujatha Perera (Attanayake), "Gang Ivuru Paduru Gane" with Sidney Attygalle, "Kokilaya Keviliya", "Denna Piriye Dethata Oya Detha" with H. R. Jothipala, and "Ithin Palak Nehe Kumariya" with J. A. Milton Perera.

In the mid-sixties, she joined the Sinhala calypso musical group 'Los Cabelleros' led by the late Neville Fernando. They recorded ever-popular Sinhala songs such as "Malbara Himidiriye," "Menike Obe Sinawe," and "Sandak Nage.". Rukmani Devi was also featured prominently on the airwaves of Radio Ceylon, the oldest radio station in South Asia.

== Death ==
Rukmani Devi died in a car accident near St. Mary's Church, Thudella, on October 28, 1978. She was returning after a musical show in Uyanwatte, Matara. Her funeral ceremony was attended by a very large gathering, including filmmakers and dramatists, friends, politicians, relatives, and her beloved fans.

She was the most celebrated Sri Lankan artist, and a statue in her memory was erected at Kanuwana Junction. The road on which the Rukmani Devi Museum in Negombo is located was also renamed 'Rukmani Devi Mawatha' by President Ranasinghe Premadasa on October 28, 1990.

== Awards ==
- Best background singer for the song 'Doi doiya putha' in the film 'Ahasin Polawata' at the 1976 inaugural Presidential Awards Ceremony.
- Best actress Award for 'Kele Handa' at the 'Deepasika' awards ceremony conducted by 'Lankadipa' Newspaper in 1956.
- Voted Best Actress with a majority of 16,221 votes at the 'Reader's Contest' conducted by 'Dinamina' Newspaper in 1955.

== In popular culture ==
She was the one and only Sri Lankan actress on the cover page of popular Indian film magazine Filmfare and was also featured in "My Likes and Dislikes" in 1958 in the Filmfare. The second generation Toyota HiAce is known in Sri Lanka as the Rukmani Model, because she was travelling in one when she had her fatal accident.

== Attack on grave site ==
On 12 August 2011, a former mayor of Negombo and a former Minister of the Parliament Ananda Munasinghe was allegedly charged and arrested by the Negombo police for dislodging the statue of Rukmani Devi, erected on her grave by one of her fans, Sriyani Achala Dissanayake. Several popular media bloated this incident as an attack by an unidentified group of criminals to Rukmani Devi's grave, and a protest rally to this incident was organised in Negombo on 14 August 2011.

== Songs ==
- Ada Handanawa Himiyani Yasodara
- Adara Nadiya Gala
- Adara Pana Suda
- Adaraya Nisa Harde Bandena
- Adarayai Karunawayi
- Alokaya Hama Thana Pathire
- Anna Sudo Ara Pata Wala - (with Mohideen Beg)
- Ara Ramani Pem Handa Akase - (with Dharmadasa Walpola)
- Ase Geethe Madura Jeewe - (with Dharmadasa Walpola)
- Asure Nisa Me
- Chandra Mage Ko Ane
- Dadi Kala Matha
- Dalwaw Bathi Adara Pem
- Danno Budunge
- Deerghayu Siri Labewa - (With H. W. Rupasinghe & Kokila Devi)
- Denna Priye Dathata Oya Datha
- Deviyan Ko Saman Deviyan
- Dewa Gini Mawa
- Dharmaraja Maraji - (With H. W. Rupasinghe)
- Doi Doiya Putha
- Dushmantha Aho Kimado
- Gala Kandeni
- Giye Aida Mawa Thanikara
- Hada Gilei Ama Mihire - (with Mohideen Baig)
- Herdhey Pina-aei
- Jaya Mangala Gatha
- Jeewithe Ma
- Kiyanna Rankanda
- Koheda Yanne Ran Menike Oya
- Lakmenige Darukela - (with H. W. Rupasinghe & Kokila Devi)
- Mage Prema Raja
- Manike Obe Sinahawe - (with Neville Fernando)
- Mata Mata Gamini Mata - (with H. W. Rupasinghe)
- Mawa Penwala
- Muhude Pathule Kimidee - (with Mohideen Baig)
- Muniraja Diyana Swami - (With H. W. Rupasinghe)
- Muni Sri Dalada - (With master H.W.Rupasinghe)
- Nilambare Paya - (With master H.W.Rupasinghe)
- Pem Rajadhane Ahas Maligavo - (with Milton Mallawarachchi)
- Pem Rajaya
- Pem Sagare
- Raja Sri Mangala - (With H. W. Rupasinghe)
- Sandyawe Pena Pena - (with H. W. Rupasinghe)
- Saranawewa Wasana - (With H. W. Rupasinghe & Kokila Devi)
- Siri Buddhagaya Vihare - (With H. W. Rupasinghe)
- Siri Pada Kamal - (With H. W. Rupasinghe)
- Silpa Satara Loke - (With H. W. Rupasinghe)
- Srimuni Gautama - (With H. W. Rupasinghe)
- Siriyavi Mage - (With Mabel Blyth)
- Sudata Sudey - (With Mohideen Baig)
- Thayam Mayam
- Thribhuwana Jana Puja - (With H. W. Rupasinghe)
- Wandimee Sadaren - (with H. W. Rupasinghe & Kokila Devi)
- Wasanawantha Kala Laba - (with Dharmadasa Walpola)

== Filmography ==
Year	Film	Role	Ref.
1947	Kadawunu Poronduwa	Ranjani	
1948	Kapati Arakshakaya	Mallika	
1948	Waradunu Kurumanama	Swarna	
1949	Peralena Iranama	Sunetha	
1950	Hadisi Vinischaya	Kanthi	
1951	Segawunu Pilithura	Kusumalatha 'Chandralata'	
1952	Umathu Vishwasaya	Susila / Padma	
1953	Kele Handa	Malini	
1954	Iranganie	Iranganie	
1955	Mathabhedaya	Kusuma	
1955	Perakadoru Bena	Malini Gunathilaka	
1956	Dosthara	Chandra	
1957	Siriyalatha	Siriyalatha 'Agnes' 'Kusina' / Sriyawathie	
1959	Daivayogaya	Sheela Kumari	
1960	Kawata Andare	Andare's wife	
1960	Nalangana	Prema / Asha	
1962	Daskon	Premila	
1963	Mangalika	Mangalika	
1964	Samiya Birindage Deviyaya	Wife Chandra	
1964	Heta Pramada Wadi	Rupa	
1965	Sathutai Kandulai		
1965	Laa Dalu		
1966	Sampatha		
1967	Rahas Dupatha		
1967	Rena Giraw	Clubgoer	
1967	Pipena Kumudu		
1967	Magul Poruwa		
1968	Abuddassa Kale		
1969	Paara Walalu		
1969	Romeo Juliet Kathawak		
1970	Nim Walalla		
1971	Sahanaya		
1971	Seeye Nottuwa		
1971	Samanala Kumariyo		
1972	Veeduru Gewal	Auntie	
1972	Hathara Wate	Manike	
1972	Ihatha Athmaya	Emily 'Pissu Amma'	
1973	Suhada Pathuma	Chamila's mother	
1973	Hondata Hondai	Chammi's mother	
1974	Hadawath Naththo		
1974	Lasanda	Chai Jayawansa	
1974	Jeewana Ganga		
1974	Dinum Kanuwa		
1974	Sagarika		
1975	Kohoma Kiyannada	Samanthi's mother	
1975	Jeewana Geethaya		
1975	Hitha Honda Minihek	Rukmani	
1975	Obai Mamai	Sheela	
1975	Sukiri Kella	Soma Dharmapala	
1975	Lassana Dawasak	Nilanthi's mother	
1976	Nayana		
1976	Kawuda Raja	Nilanthi's mother	
1976	Wasana	Mrs. Rajadasa	
1976	Harima Badu Thunak	Auntie	
1976	Unnath Dahai Malath Dahai		
1976	Hariyata Hari	Mrs. Gunathilake	
1976	Onna Mame Kella Panapi		
1976	Saradielge Putha	Kumari Hami 'Manike'	
1976	Adarei Man Adarei		
1976	Nedeyo	Sara	
1976	Ran Thilaka		
1977	Sudu Paraviyo	Rajesh's mother	
1977	Sri Madara	Mercy de Soysa	
1977	Chin Chin Nona		
1977	Tom Pachaya	Ranawaka	
1978	Kundalakeshi	Queen	
1977	Deviyani Oba Kohida	Elizabeth's mother	
1977	Sajaa		
1977	Hithuwoth Hithuwamai		
1978	Madhuwanthi	Maduwanthi's mother	
1978	Apsara		
1978	Ahasin Polowata		
1979	Samanmali	Mother	
1979	Monarathenna	Biso	
1979	Anusha	Mrs. Ratnayake	
1979	Nuwan Renu	Nuwan's Mother 'Silawathie Hamine'	
1979	Jeewana Kandulu	Geetha's mother	
1979	Amal Biso		
1979	Ran Kurullo	Sujatha's mother	
1979	Podi Malli	Nalika's mother	
1979	Tak Tik Tuk		
1980	Silva		
1980	Sinhabahu		
1981	Sathara Diganthaya		
1981	Hondama Naluwa		
1981	Bamba Ketu Hati		
1981	Senasuma		
1981	Jeewanthi		
1982	Thana Giravi	Clara	
1982	Sakvithi Suwaya	Tissa's mother	
1982	Sudu Ayya	Mrs. Ranatunga	
1982	Kadawunu Poronduwa remake	Song performer	
1982	Sithara		
1983	Hithath Hondai Wadath Hondai		
1983	Sandamali	Sandamali's mother	
1984	Ara Soyza	Vadigapatuna's mother	
