= Tushar =

Tushar may refer to:

== Given name ==
- Tushar Amarsinh Chaudhary (born 1965), member of the 14th Lok Sabha of India
- Tushar Gandhi (born 1960), great-grandson of Mahatma Gandhi and son of journalist Arun Manilal Gandhi
- Tushar Imran (born 1983), cricketer from Bangladesh
- Tushar Kanti Ghosh, Indian author and journalist
- Tushar Khandker, hockey player from Jhansi, India
- Tushar Makwana (1967–2004), British radio personality
- Tushar Ranganath (1974–2011), movie director
- Thushara Pillai (born 1980), Indian astrophysicist

== Surname ==
- Steve Tushar, American Latin Grammy nominated record producer/remixer and musician

== Other uses ==
- Tushara, ancient kingdom located beyond north-west India, likely referring to
  - Tokharistan, the region of Bactria in the Middle Ages
- Tushar Mountains, the third highest mountain range in Utah

== See also ==
- Thushara, alternative form of the Indian given name
- Thushaaram, a 1981 Indian film
- Tocharian (disambiguation)
