= Bicycle Hora =

Bicycle Hora බයිසිකල් හොරා
- Directed by: K.A.W. Perera
- Written by: K. A. W. Perera
- Produced by: EAP Films
- Starring: Oswald Jayasinghe; Sandhya Kumari; Jeevarani Kurukulasuriya; D. R. Nanayakkara
- Cinematography: Lenin Moraes
- Edited by: Elmo Halliday
- Music by: Premasiri Khemadasa
- Release date: 26 May 1968
- Country: Sri Lanka
- Language: Sinhala

Bicycle Hora is a 1968 Sri Lankan Black and white thriller film directed by K.A.W. Perera and produced by E. A. P. Edirisinghe for EAP Films. The film stars Oswald Jayasinghe and Sandhya Kumari in lead roles whereas Jeevarani Kurukulasuriya, D. R. Nanayakkara and Wally Nanayakkara made supportive roles. Film music score done by Premasiri Khemadasa.

The film received critics acclaim and later won many awards at third Sarasaviya Awards Ceremony.

== Cast ==
- Sandhya Kumari
- Oswald Jayasinghe
- D. R. Nanayakkara
- Jeevarani Kurukulasuriya
- Wally Nanayakkara
- Gemunu Wijesuriya
- Ruby de Mel
- B. S. Perera
- Leticia Peiris
- David Dharmakeerthi
- Lilian Edirisinghe
- Sonia Disa
- Pearl Vasudevi
- Richard Albert
- Joseph Seneviratne
- Robin Fernando
- Don Sirisena
- Jessica Wickramasinghe
- Herbert Amarawickrama
- Thalatha Gunasekara

== Awards ==
- Best Film – 3rd place at 6th Sarasaviya Awards - 1969
- Best Actor – D.R. Nanayakkara at 6th Sarasaviya Awards - 1969
- Best Supporting Actress – Jessica Wickramasinghe at 6th Sarasaviya Awards - 1969
- Best Director – K.A.W. Perera at 1st place at Gunwan Viduli Sammana Ulela 1970
- Best Script Writer – K.A.W. Perera at 1st place at Gunwan Viduli Sammana Ulela 1970
