= Akka Nago =

- Directed by: Vincent David
- Produced by: Chandarani wimamlasena
- Starring: Stanley Perera; Sandhya Kumari; Joe Abeywickrama
- Cinematography: William Ohlums
- Music by: P. L. A. Somapala
- Release date: 2 May 1968
- Country: Sri Lanka
- Language: Sinhala

Akka Nago is a 1968 Sri Lankan drama film directed by Vincent David.

== Cast ==
- Stanley Perera
- Sandhya Kumari
- Joe Abeywickrama
- Dommie Jayawardena
- D. R. Nanayakkara
- David Dharmakeerthi
- Richard Albert
- Jessica Wickramasinghe
- Piyadasa Wijekoon
- Shirani Kurukulasuriya
- Janaki Kurukulasuriya
- Udula Dabare
- Lilian Edirisinghe
- Prasanna Fonseka
