= Wijekoon =

Wijekoon is a surname. Notable people with the surname include:

- Chaminda Indika Wijekoon (born 1981), Sri Lankan runner
- Gayan Wijekoon (born 1976), Sri Lankan cricketer
- Nancy Wijekoon, Sri Lankan poet
- Niroshan Wijekoon (born 1964), Sri Lankan badminton player
- Piyadasa Wijekoon (1940–2003), Sri Lankan actor
- Subasinghe Wijekoon (born 1963), Professor of Sociology
