= G. S. B. Rani =

Sri Lankan singer and actress (1934–2004)

G. S. B. Rani ජී. ඇස්. බී. රාණි
- Born: Gnai Seenar Bangsajayah; 20 August 1930; Guruwatta, Badulla, Sri Lanka
- Died: 7 September 2004 (aged 74)
- Other name: Rani Perera
- Education: Clifton Balika Vidyalaya
- Occupations: Songstress, actress, politician
- Spouse: Anton Perera (m. 1953)
- Children: 3
- Parents: Nusammeen Bangsajayah (father); Chintha Nona (mother)
- Awards: Rana Thisara
- Musical career
- Genres: Pop; Indian classical music
- Instrument: Vocals
- Years active: 1944–2004
- Labels: Columbia, His Master's Voice

Kala Suri Gnai Seenar Bangsajayah (born 18 October 1934 – died 7 September 2004 as ජී. ඇස්. බී. රාණි), popularly known as G. S. B. Rani, was a Sri Lankan actress in Sri Lankan cinema, theater as well as a songstress, politician and a media personality. She was one of the most popular playback singers in early Sri Lankan cinema industry with a career spanned over five decades.

== Personal life ==
Gnai Seenar was born on 20 August 1930 in Guruwatta village, Badulla as the only daughter to a Malay family. Her father Nusammeen Bangsajayah was a police sergeant and later became sub inspector. Her mother was Chintha Nona. She completed education from Clifton Balika Vidyalaya, Colombo.

She was married to Ranawaka Arachchige Anton Perera and wedding was celebrated on 17 February 1953. Anton was an employee of the Sri Lanka Steel Corporation. The couple had three children - Ranjith, Chandana and Udeni. Even though she was Malay and husband was Sinhala Catholic, the family converted to Buddhism.

She died on 7 September 2004 around 3.30 pm after a brief illness.

== Politics ==
Her brother-in-law, R. S. Perera was a politician. She became a Sri Lanka Freedom Party (SLFP) supporter and an all Island organizer of the women's wing of the Party. She contested for the 1967 Municipality elections from Milagiriya and lost by 448 votes. However, she continued to work in politics for 45 years, where she lost the career at Radio Ceylon as well. During the general election she was included to the National List of MPs from SLFP and narrowly missed the opportunity.

On 4 September 2004, she participated to the 53rd anniversary of the Sri Lanka Freedom Party held at Samanala Palama in Galle. This was her last appearance in media before her death.

== Discography ==
In 1944, Rani went to the Columbia Records studios with her cousin Ahmed at the age of 14 for an audition at Porolis Fernando Company. She met with U.D. Perera and Mohammad Ghouse and got the opportunity to record songs under the Columbia label including two Columbia records: Samagi Bale Paame, and Siri Sara Bhavane, a duet with Mohideen Baig. However, her father refused to using her own name in music industry, she abbreviated her name to G. S. B. Rani since then. She continued to sing for almost every Sinhala film in following years and sang duets with Mohideen Baig, Dharmadasa Walpola, H. R. Jothipala, Sisira Senaratne, N. Karunaratne and W. Prematilleka. Some of her most popular hits include Parama Ramani Ape Ale and Sengi Sengi Atha Suraya Dilenna. Apart from Sinhala songs, she was also clever at Hindi and Urdu songs.

In 1946, she was invited to record playback singing for the film Ashokamala. However, during that period, she lost her father and mother. Therefore, she was unable to move India for the recording and Indian playback singer Bhagyarathi sang the songs. After the death of mother, Rani was brought into the Radio Ceylon for an audition under P.L.A. Somapala.

Meantime, she became an 'A Grade' artiste at the Radio Ceylon under Indian composer Shrikrishna Narayan Ratanjankar. She worked as a Musical Program Producer at the Radio Ceylon from 1970 to 1977 and conducted popular music programs such as "Jana Prasangani", "Geetha Tharangani" and "Prabuddha Gee". During her seven years period, she introduced many popular singers to Sinhala music industry, including Nanda Malini, H. R. Jothipala, Edward Jayakody, Victor Rathnayake, T.M. Jayarathne, Priya Suriyasena, Malani Bulathsinhala and Abeywardhana Balasooriya and successfully recorded over 7000 new Sinhala original songs. She also managed to attend a young Buddhist priest at the Radio Ceylon for a Dhamma Chinthawak program. The program was highly popularized became the first Buddhist sermon on the radio. This young priest later ordained to Upasampadā and later known as Panadure Ariya Dhamma Thero.

In 1955, she got the opportunity to enter Sinhala cinema with playback singing to the film Asoka directed by Sirisena Wimalaweera. In the film, Rani sang the song Pem Pahan Nivi Pam Mala Paravi along with Mohideen Baig, which became highly popular. Then she sang the songs with Dharmadasa Walpola for the film Surangani.

In 1977, she was ostracized as a singer by the Sri Lanka Broadcasting Corporation for 15 years due to political conflicts with United National Party (UNP). In 1994, Rani was appointed as the Director of the Independent Television Network by the president Chandrika Kumaratunga. She worked in that position until 2001. In February 2004, Rani celebrated 60 years of singing career with the concert Parama Ramani held at BMICH. In March of the same year, she went London to participate in "Swarna Gee concert" organised by Hela Sarana Charity.

During her visit to London, she sang a duet with Ishaq Baig, son of late Mohideen Baig. With that song, Rani became the only Sri Lankan female singer to sing with singers of two generations, father and son.

== Acting career ==
She started acting with some popular stage dramas including, J.D.A. Perera's Wessanthara, Upali Wanasinghe's Daskon and then from Rodi Kella. She was the "Mandri Devi" in Wessanthara and "Queen Premila" in Daskon.

She has acted in few films in early Sinhala cinema. Her maiden appearance in cinema came through 1955 film Surangani as an "aunt". Then she acted in the film Duppathage Duka as a supervisor at a garment.

She won the Rana Thisara Award at 1995 Sarasaviya Film Festival, on behalf of her service to Sri Lankan cinema and music industry. She was also honored with Wishva Prasadini, Kalasoori awards.

== Filmography ==
Year	Film	Role	Ref.
1955	Surangani	Aunt, Playback singer	
1955	Asoka	Playback singer	
1955	Podi Putha	Playback singer	
1956	Duppathage Duka	Garment supervisor, Playback singer	
1956	Surathali	Playback singer	
1957	Sirakaruwa	Playback singer	
1958	Ekamath Eka Rataka	Playback singer	
1958	Deyyange Rate	Playback singer	
1958	Daskama	Playback singer	
1958	Suneetha	Playback singer	
1959	Purusha Rathnaya	Playback singer	
1959	Sri 296	Playback singer	
1959	Gehenu Geta	Playback singer	
1960	Subhadra	Playback singer	
1960	Sundara Birinda	Playback singer	
1960	Nalangana	Playback singer	
1960	Wana Mala	Playback singer	
1961	Kurulu Bedda	Playback singer	
1961	Gan Thera	Playback singer	
1961	Daruwa Kageda?	Playback singer	
1962	Deva Sundari	Playback singer	
1963	Wena Swargayak Kumatada?	Playback singer	
1963	Mangalika	Playback singer	
1964	Chandali	Playback singer	
1964	Sujage Rahasa	Playback singer	
1965	Sepatha Soya	Playback singer	
1965	Sathutai Kandului	Playback singer	
1965	Sonduru Yuwala	Playback singer	
1966	Maha Re Hamuwu Sthriya	Playback singer	
1966	Mahadena Muththa	Playback singer	
1966	Seyawak Pasupasa	Playback singer	
1966	Seegiri Kashyapa	Playback singer	
1966	Layata Laya	Playback singer	
1967	Hathara Kendare	Playback singer	
1967	Saru Bima	Playback singer	
1968	Mathru Bhumi	Playback singer	
1972	Miringuwa	Playback singer	
1977	Wanagatha Kella	Playback singer	
