= Thushara (2009 film) =

Thushara තුෂාරා
- Directed by: Sahan Wijesinghe
- Written by: Sahan Wijesinghe
- Based on: Yasapalitha Nanayakkara Thushara film
- Produced by: Saga Films
- Starring: Saliya Sathyajith; Shalika Edirisinghe; Rex Kodippili
- Cinematography: K. D. Dayananda
- Edited by: Ravindra Lal; Ruwan Chamara
- Music by: Sarath de Alwis
- Release date: 9 September 2009
- Country: Sri Lanka
- Language: Sinhala

Thushara (Sinhala: තුෂාරා) is a 2009 Sri Lankan Sinhala romantic film directed and produced by Sahan Wijesinghe for Saga Films. The film is a remake of Yasapalitha Nanayakkara's yesteryear movie Thushara in 1973. It stars Saliya Sathyajith and Shalika Edirisinghe in lead roles along with Buddhika Rambukwella and Piumi Purasinghe. Music composed by Sarath de Alwis. It is the 1130th Sri Lankan film in the Sinhala cinema.

== Plot ==
Sampath, Thushara and Keerthi are batchmates. Sonia is a relation of Sampath. Thushara is Sampath's girl friend at campus. Sonia and Thushara are friends. Sonia's father and Sampath's mother tries to make them marry but Sampath doesn't have any romantic feelings for Sonia. So Sonia and specially her father does things to put apart Thushara and Sampath. One is to tell fake things to Thushara's father about Sampath and make him disappointed. Another one is attacking Sampath at a club. The story goes on as Sampath persists those challenges and finally marries Thushara and at the end of the film we get the feeling that Sonia and Keerthi find love between them too.

== Cast ==
- Saliya Sathyajith as Sampath
- Shalika Edirisinghe as Thushara
- Buddhika Rambukwella as Keerthi
- Piumi Purasinghe as Soniya
- Sahan Wijesinghe as Vijay
- Robin Fernando as Thushara's father
- Rex Kodippili as Sonia's father
- Sonia Disa as Sampath's mother
- Chitra Wakishta as Wilson's fiancée's mother
- Anju Bandara Rajaguru
- Chathura Perera as Wilson
- Chitra Wakishta

== Soundtrack ==
No.	Title	Singer(s)	Length
1.	"Oho Thushara"	H. R. Jothipala
2.	"Meedum Gala Kande"	H. R. Jothipala, Angeline Gunathilake
3.	"Jeewanaye Meewanaye"	Angeline Gunathilake
4.	"Kalak Thisse Sithak Pathule"	H. R. Jothipala, Angeline Gunathilake
5.	"Maa Hada Obai Dayawi"	H. R. Jothipala
6.	"Rantharu Se Punsada Se"	Sujatha Aththanayake
7.	"Kaudo Me Awe"	Sujatha Aththanayake
