= Amathikama =

Amathikama ඇමතිකම
- Directed by: Nihal Jayasinghe
- Written by: Nihal Jayasinghe
- Produced by: S. P. Muththaiya
- Starring: Joe Abeywickrama; Hugo Fernando; Sandhya Kumari
- Cinematography: J. Selvaratnam
- Edited by: Vincent David
- Music by: R. Muttusamy
- Release date: 22 July 1968
- Country: Sri Lanka
- Language: Sinhala

Amathikama is a 1968 Sri Lankan black and white drama film directed by Nihal Jayasinghe and produced by S. P. Muththaiya. The film stars Joe Abeywickrama and Sandhya Kumari in lead roles with supportive roles for Hugo Fernando, D.R. Nanayakkara and Pearl Vasudevi. Music was directed by R. Muttusamy.

== Cast ==
- Joe Abeywickrama as Mudalali
- Hugo Fernando as Arachchi
- Sandhya Kumari
- D.R. Nanayakkara
- Pearl Vasudevi
- Jessica Wickramasinghe
- H. R. Jothipala
- B. S. Perera
- Sirimathi Rasadari
- Eddie Junior
- Lilian Edirisinghe
- M. V. Balan
- Hilda Agnes
- Milton Jayawardena
- Pujitha Mendis
- Sunil Wesley Perera
- Ione Weerasinghe
