= Piyadasa =

Piyadasa is a name. Notable people with the name include:

- Piyadasa Gunasekera (1915–1980), Sri Lankan actor
- Piyadasa Ranasinghe (1946–1989), Sri Lankan political activist
- Piyadasa Sirisena, Ceylonese novelist, patriot, journalist, temperance worker and independence activist
- Piyadasa Wijekoon (1940–2003), Sri Lankan actor
- Redza Piyadasa (1939–2007), Malaysian artist
