= Surangani =

Surangani may refer to:

- Surangani (song), a Baila song
- Surangani (film), a 1955 movie
- Surangani (2013 film), a Vishnuvardhan movie
- Surangani Ellawala, a Sri Lankan politician
