= Thushara =

Thushara or Thusara (Sinhala: තුෂාරා) is a Sinhalese name that may refer to the following notable people:

Given name

- Thushara Fernando (born 1982), Sri Lankan cricketer
- Thushara Indunil, Sri Lankan politician
- Thusara Kodikara (born 1969), Malaysian cricketer
- Thushara Madushanka (born 1993), Sri Lankan cricketer
- Thushara Pillai (born 1980), Indian astrophysicist

Surname

- Nuwan Thushara (born 1994), Sri Lankan cricketer
- Thilan Thushara (born 1981), Sri Lankan cricketer

== See also ==
- Thushara (1973 film), a Sri Lankan romantic film
- Thushara (2009 film), a Sri Lankan romantic film
