= Pearl Vasudevi =

Sri Lankan actress and singer

- පර්ල් වාසුදේවි
- Born: Pearl Peters; 30 March 1915; Galle, Sri Lanka
- Died: 19 June 1987 (aged 72)
- Education: Good Shepherd Convent, Colombo
- Occupation: Actress
- Years active: 1930–1987
- Spouse: Eddie Junior (m. 1940)
- Children: 1

Pearl Peters (30 March 1915 – 19 June 1987 as පර්ල් වාසුදේවි) [Sinhala]), popularly known as Pearl Vasudevi, was an actress in Sri Lankan cinema as well as a singer.

== Personal life ==
Vasudevi was born as Pearl Peters in Galle on March 30, 1915, to a Burgher family. She studied at the Good Shepherd Convent, Colombo and became interested in theater at a young age.

She was married to fellow actor Eddie Junior. The couple has one daughter, Sujeewa Lalee. Sujeewa also acted in few films including maiden acting in Sithijaya. Vasudevi died 19 June 1987 at the age of 72 following a brief illness.

== Career ==
Vasudevi made her debut as an actress in 1930 playing the role of a princess in the play Aparikshakari Nadu Theenduwa at the age of 15. With her fluency in English, she also secured a leading role in an adaption of Merchant of Venice. Vasudevi joined Eddie Master's troupe shortly after acting in the role of Seetha in Ramayanaya. The dramatist's son Eddie Junior composed the music for the play. Through their work together, Pearl and Eddie Junior fell in love and got married in 1940. She also served as a Radio Ceylon singer at Sri Lanka Broadcasting Corporation (SLBC).

Vasudevi made her film debut with husband Eddie Junior in Sirisena Wimalaweera's 1949 movie Amma. She subsequently appeared in over 150 films including Sithijaya with her daughter Sujeewa Lalee.

== Filmography ==
Year	Film	Role	Ref.
1949	Amma	Nila	
1955	Surangani		
1964	Kala Kala De Pala Pala De		
1965	Sekaya	Gossip	
1966	Mahadena Muththa	Thalamalie's mother	
1966	Senasili Suwaya	Sumith's relative	
1968	Pini Bindu		
1968	Bicycle Hora		
1968	Amathikama		
1969	Pickpocket	Hamine	
1969	Uthum Sthriya		
1969	Praweshamwanna	Sonia's mother	
1970	Thevatha		
1971	Dawena Pipasa		
1971	Kathuru Muwath	Woman at Sasthara center	
1971	Hathara Denama Surayo	Bath amma	
1971	Seeye Nottuwa		
1972	Sithijaya		
1972	Edath Suraya Adath Suraya	Johnny's mother	
1972	Lokuma Hinawa	Karolina	
1973	Matara Achchi	Village gossip	
1973	Aparadhaya Ha Danduwama		
1974	Dinum Kanuwa		
1974	Hadawath Naththo		
1974	Shanthi		
1974	Sahayata Danny	Estranged wife of Sandun's friend	
1974	Rodi Gama		
1974	Susee	Susee's Mother 'Sello Hami'	
1975	Tharanga	Granny	
1975	Cyril Malli		
1975	Lassana Kella	Nandamma	
1975	Kokilayo		
1975	Sangeetha		
1976	Hulawali	Villager	
1976	Onna Mame Kella Panapi		
1976	Adarei Man Adarei		
1977	Honda Hitha		
1977	Chandi Putha		
1977	Aege Adara Kathawa		
1978	Sithaka Suwanda	Emily aunty	
1978	Madhuwanthi	Mrs. Silva	
1978	Hitha Mithura		
1978	Sally		
1978	Kumara Kumariyo	Karunawathie	
1978	Saara	Perera 'Nona'	
1979	Samanmali	Darling 'Akka'	
1979	Amal Biso		
1979	Palagetiyo	Sophie	
1979	Nuwan Renu	Head nurse	
1979	Podi Malli	Belin	
1979	Handaya	Susie	
1979	Visihathara Peya		
1980	Ektam Ge	Nathilin	
1980	Raja Dawasak		
1981	Kolamkarayo	Allan	
1981	Thawalama		
1982	Bicycley	Bath Amma	
1982	Jeewithayen Jeewithayak		
1982	Chathu Madhura	'Army affair' gossiper	
1983	Ran Mini Muthu		
1983	Chandi Siriya		
1984	Bambara Patikki		
1984	Sahodariyakage Kathawa		
1986	Peralikarayo	Mrs. Florescent	
1987	Yugayen Yugayata		
1987	Hitha Honda Chandiya	Muslim shopkeeper's wife	
1987	Nommara Ekai	Johanna 'Aunty'	
1988	The Further Adventures of Tennessee Buck	Chief's mother	
1988	Newatha Hamuwemu		
1989	Waradata Danduwam		
