= Eddie Junior =

Sri Lankan actor (1926–1982)

Eddie Junior එඩී ජූනියර්
- Born: Bulathsinhalage Hubert de Silva; 12 March 1926; Negombo, Sri Lanka
- Died: 3 November 1982 (aged 56)
- Occupations: Actor, Singer, Composer
- Years active: 1949–1982
- Spouse: Pearl Vasudevi (m. 1940)
- Children: 1
- Father: Eddie de Silva

Bulathsinhalage Hubert de Silva (12 March 1926 – 3 November 1982 as එඩී ජූනියර්) [Sinhala]), popularly known by his stage name Eddie Junior, was an actor in Sri Lankan cinema and theater as well as a music composer and singer.

== Personal life ==
Junior was born on 12 March 1926 in Negombo. His father Eddie de Silva, who was popularly known as Eddie Master was a renowned music composer. In time, he joined his father's theater troupe as a composer and actor. There he met actress Pearl Vasudevi; they married in 1940. The couple has one daughter, Sujeewa Lalee. Sujeewa also acted in a few films including maiden acting in Sithijaya. Vasudevi died on 19 June 1987 at the age of 72 following a brief illness.

== Cinema career ==
Junior started his acting career with stage dramas conducted by Sirisena Wimalaweera. In his plays, Junior provided both music and singing. One of the most popular theater song "Gowe Ganu Paradai" sung by Junior came in Samudra Devi stage drama.

After becoming a cinema actor, he was the music director of the 1949 film Amma whose music was composed by N. Pandurangan. He appeared as one of Pandurajan's supporting musicians with the name B.S. H. De Silva. In the same film, Junior made his film debut with his wife Vasudevi. They continued to act together in many popular films of the era, including, Surangani, Ran Rasa, Pancha and Me Desa Kumatada.

== Filmography ==
Year	Film	Role	Ref.
1949	Amma	Tilaka	
1951	Seedevi	Rupendra	
1954	Radala Piliruwa		
1955	Surangani	Sena	
1962	Deva Sundari		
1965	Sekaya	Andiris 'Appu'	
1966	Senasili Suwaya	Podi Ralahamy	
1967	Ran Rasa	Head Doctor	
1968	Pini Bindu		
1968	Wanasara		
1968	Amathikama		
1969	Oba Nathinam		
1969	Hari Maga	Banda	
1969	Pickpocket	Pukkala Mudalali	
1969	Uthum Sthriya		
1969	Pancha		
1971	Dawena Pipasa		
1971	Seeye Nottuwa		
1972	Sithijaya		
1972	Edath Suraya Adath Suraya	Doctor	
1972	Hithaka Pipunu Mal	Father	
1972	Lokuma Hinawa	Ralahamy	
1972	Me Desa Kumatada	Vijay's adoptive father	
1973	Matara Achchi	Gunapala's drunkard friend	
1973	Suhada Pathuma		
1974	Kasthuri Suwanda	Kanchana's father	
1974	Susee	Liyana Mahathaya	
1974	Vasthuwa		
1974	Rodi Gama		
1975	Aese Idiripita		
1975	Cyril Malli		
1975	Ranwan Rekha		
1975	Sangeetha	Mudalithuma	
1976	Pradeepe Ma Wewa		
1976	Wanarayo		
1976	Hariyata Hari	Liyana Mahathaya	
1976	Hulawali	Balaya	
1976	Onna Mame Kella Panapi		
1976	Adarei Man Adarei		
1977	Chin Chin Nona		
1977	Chandi Putha	Eddie	
1977	Aege Adara Kathawa		
1978	Sithaka Suwanda	Robert	
1978	Madhuwanthi	Mr. Silva	
1978	Sally		
1978	Kumara Kumariyo	Sagara's father	
1978	Ahasin Polawata		
1978	Kundalakeshi	Situthuma	
1979	Nuwan Renu	Jayaweera	
1979	Minisun Athara Minisek		
1980	Tak Tik Tuk	Director	
1980	Anuhasa		
1980	Raja Dawasak		
1980	Hondin Inna		
1981	Samawenna	Mr. Samaranayake	
1982	Sudu Ayya	Sumathipala	
1982	Sithaara		
1982	Kadawunu Poronduwa remake	Sinhala debtor	
1984	Bambara Patikki		
1984	Kokila	Professor Abeyweera	
1984	Hithawathiya	Mr. Jayasekara	
1984	Hadawathaka Wedana		
1985	Kirimaduwal		
