= C.S. Sudha =

Indian judge

Chandrasekharan Sudha

Judge of Delhi High Court
- In office 28 October 2025 – 8 October 2026
- Nominated by: B. R. Gavai
- Appointed by: Droupadi Murmu

Judge of Kerala High Court
- In office 20 October 2021 – 27 October 2025
- Nominated by: N. V. Ramana
- Appointed by: Ramnath Kovind

Personal details
- Born: 9 October 1964 (age 61) Thiruvananthapuram
- Education: B.A. LL.B
- Alma mater: Kendriya Vidyalaya, Pattom, Mar Ivanios College, Government Law College, Thiruvananthapuram
- Profession: Judge, Lawyer
- Known for: Judiciary in the Kerala High Court

Chandrasekharan Sudha (born 9 October 1964) is a retired Indian judge. She has served as a judge at the Delhi High Court and Kerala High Court.

== Early life and career ==
She was born on 9 October 1964 at Thiruvananthapuram. She completed her education from Kendriya Vidyalaya School, Pattom, Thiruvananthapuram. She obtained BA Economics from Mar Ivanios College, Thiruvananthapuram and LLB from Government Law College, Thiruvananthapuram. She enrolled as Advocate on 8 January1989 and commenced practice at District Court, Thiruvananthapuram and entered Judicial service in the year 1995, after having secured 1st rank in the selection process. She has served in various capacities as Munsiff-Magistrate and Sub Judge/Asst.Sessions Judge. She was promoted as District & Sessions Judge in 2012 and officiated as Addl.District & Sessions Judge in Kollam. In 2013, she went on deputation as Registrar, Competition Appellate Tribunal, New Delhi and was appointed as Registrar, National Company Law Appellate Tribunal, New Delhi in 2017. She was repatriated and served as Spl. Judge, PoCSO, Palakkad and thereafter as Additional Director, Kerala Judicial Academy. She was appointed as District & Sessions Judge/STAT, Ernakulam and assumed office as such on 24 May 2021.

She has been appointed as Additional Judge of the High Court of Kerala on 20 October 2021 and was made Permanent on 5 September 2023. She was transferred to Delhi High Court and assumed office on 28 October 2025.

== See also ==
- Kerala High Court
