= Sirimathi Rasadari =

Sri Lankan actress (1932–1992)

Sirimathi Rasadari සිරිමතී රසාදරී
- Born: Sirimathi Mary Fernando; 10 May 1932; Wennappuwa, Sri Lanka
- Died: September 3, 1992 (aged 60); Colombo
- Education: Dummaladeniya Roman Catholic School
- Occupations: Actress, Dancer
- Years active: 1947–1992
- Spouse: Rathna Dissanayake

Sirimathi Mary Fernando (born 10 May 1932 - died 3 September 1992 as සිරිමතී රසාදරී) [Sinhala]), popularly known as Sirimathi Rasadari, was an actress in Sri Lankan cinema, as well as a renowned Kathak dancer. Considered as the first in Sri Lanka to mastered the art of dancing, acting, singing and writing at the same time, she is the pioneer to establish United Ceylon Fan Club in 1957.

== Personal life ==
She was born on 10 May 1932 in Nainamadama, Dummalawarama, Wennappuwa as third of the family. She had two sisters and five brothers. She was educated at Dummaladeniya Roman Catholic School. She can write, speak and read Hindi as well as can speak Tamil and English.

She was married to Rathna Dissanayake, who was a lecturer at Giragama Aesthetic University. Rasadari also served as a visiting lecturer at the University of the Visual and Performing Arts.

Rasadari died on 3 September 1992 at the age of 60.

== Career ==
In 1939 while at the school, she contested for a singing competition conducted for the All Island Health Week. She won the first place from the North Western Province. With the intentions to be a dancer, she learned Kathakali dancing from Shantha Kalayathana in Meeepura under Shanthi Viraj in 1967, Bharatha and Manipuri dances by Shanthi Kumar Seneviratne and Kandyan dancing under Heenbaba Dharmasiri for eight years. She was the first Sri Lankan graduate of Bharath Kathak Dance and started a music company called Sangeetha Kendra in 1977. The specialty of this institution was that it has been approved as the Colombo Center for the passage of all music examinations in Bhatkanda since 1987.

She also became a singer at Radio Ceylon and sang on His Master's Voice and Odien gramophone trades as the supporting singer for Premanath Morais and Sunil Premadasa. She has sung the song A Maha Veera Budu Piya with Premanath Morais which has become a popular song. She also gained popularity as a singer by singing the song Paana Paththu Nokeruwata for the movie Daiwayogaya with Mohideen Baig.

Even though she was selected for the film Prema Tharagaya, she refused to act due to a scene with partial nudity. Her maiden cinema appearance came through film Puduma Leli under the supervision of Hugo Fernando at the age of 15. Then she acted in the film Dosthara where she went India for the film shooting. The she acted many popular films such as Sri 296, Surathali, Nalangana, Sansare and Samaje Sathuro.

Then she acted along with Rukmani Devi in te popular film Daiwayogaya as "Sugala". She acted as Ananda Jayaratne's girlfriend in the song Siriyame Sara, which was H.R. Jothipala's first film background song. The highlight of her acting career was the role of "Maggie" in the movie Parasathumal. During the period as a lecturer, she published a book on Indian dance Narthana Kala in Sinhala, which was first such in Sri Lanka.

== Filmography ==
Year	Film	Role	Ref.
1953	Puduma Leli	Yasohamy 'Lilly'	
1956	Dosthara	Alice	
1956	Surathali	Manel	
1958	Deyyange Rate		
1958	Vana Mohini		
1959	Daiwayogaya	Sugala. also as Playback Singer	
1959	Sri 296	Natyanganawo	
1960	Pirimiyek Nisa	Also as Playback Singer	
1960	Nalangana		
1962	Sansare		
1964	Heta Pramada Wadi	Nimala	
1964	Kala Kala De Pala Pala De		
1964	Suba Sarana Sepa Sithe		
1965	Sepatha Soya		
1966	Sampatha		
1966	Parasathu Mal	Maggie	
1967	Sath Samudura		
1968	Amathikama		
1968	Hangi Hora		
1969	Samaje Sathuro		
1980	Sasaraka Pathum		
1981	Suriyakantha		
1981	Jeewanthi		
1983	Menik Maliga		
1985	Du Daruwo		
1987	Raja Wadakarayo		
1989	Badulu Kochchiya		
1991	Golu Muhude Kunatuwa		
1992	Raje Wage Puthek		
1992	Sakkara Suththara		
1992	Salli Thibunata Madi		
1994	Vijaya Geetha	Dulcie 'Missy'	
1994	Mawbime Veerayo		
1995	Inspector Geetha		
2000	Hansa Vilapaya		
