= Leticia Peiris =

Sri Lankan actress

Leticia Peiris ලැටීෂියා පීරිස්‌
- Born: Meemanage Mary Magdalene Leticia Peiris; 18 October 1934; Kochchikade, Sri Lanka
- Died: 31 October 2013 (aged 79); No. B-16, Raddolugama, Seeduwa
- Education: Harischandra National College
- Occupation: Actress
- Years active: 1941–2008
- Spouse: Micheal de Silva
- Children: 2
- Relatives: B. A. W. Jayamanne (brother-in-law)

Meemanage Mary Magdalene Leticia Peiris (born 18 October 1934 – died 31 October 2013 as ලැටීෂියා පීරිස්‌) [Sinhala]), popularly known as Leticia Peiris, was an actress in Sri Lankan cinema, theater and television. One of the earliest pillars in Sri Lankan film history, Peiris had a career that spanned more than five decades. She is the last acting link of the Jayamanne lineage.

She died on 31 October 2013 with Alzheimer's disease at the age of 80.

== Personal life ==
Peiris was born on 18 October 1934 in Pallansena village, Kochchikade area in Colombo. She completed education from Negambo Dalupotha Vidyalaya and Harischandra National College, Negambo. Her elder sister Grace Peiris was married to popular actor B. A. W. Jayamanne. Grace met Jayamanne during a film shoot.

Leticia was married to K. Micheal de Silva and wedding was celebrated in December 1957 at the age of 24. The couple has two daughters: Chandani and Renukaa.

== Career ==
Peries started her film career with her sister and brother-in-law B.A.W. Jayamanne. She played the role of "Hilda" in the stage play Kadawunu Poronduwa at the age of 7. She was one of the earliest child actresses in Sri Lankan drama history. She continued to act as "Hilda" for a record 800 times in 10 consecutive years. But she missed out on her chance to become the first child actress of Sinhala cinema by starring in the first Sinhala film Kadawunu Poronduwa due to heavy fever. Since then she has been a member of the Jayamanne's Minerva Drama Team. She acted in stage plays Gehenu Sitha and Gedara Hatana produced by W.M. Perera.

Her maiden cinematic appearance came through 1948 film Weradunu Kurumanama directed by Jothish Singh. She then acted in 1960 film Hadisi Vinischaya and portrayed the comic support of Eddie Jayamanne in the film. She also had the privilege of becoming a singer as she sang the song "Adara Swami Kema Kannako" accompany with Eddie Jayamanne. She is also the singer who sang with Eddie Jayamanne, the second opposition Virindu song in a Sinhala film. She then portrayed the comic character Bertram Fernando in the movie Segawunu Pilithura. After the 1952 film Umathu Wishwasaya, Peiris starred in the 1957 film Siriyalatha produced by Eddie Jayamanne and produced by Rukmani Devi and directed by Indian filmmaker S. S. Rajan. She continued act in many popular films of the early era including, Seeye Nottuwa, Kathuru Muwath, Bicycle Hora, Duleeka, Ihatha Athmaya, Wathura Karththaya and Wasanthaye Dawasak. She performed excellently in the 1957 film Siriyalatha opposite to Rukmani Devi. In 1988, Peiris received the "Namaskara Pooja' Upahara Pranama Award" at the Sarasaviya Awards.

After the marriage, she quit from the acting and continued to support his husband and children. After her children returning to adulthood, she returned to the stage drama and starred in the play Kadawuna Poronduwa directed by Mark Samaranayake. She returned to cinema at the invitation of K.A.W. Perera in 1970 with the film Kathuru Muwath. Since then, Peiris played a comic or horror character in every film made by K.A.W. Perera. She is also a popular radio singer in Sri Lanka Broadcasting Corporation (SLBC).

She is also the only member of the Jayamanne family who was fortunate enough to join the television screen. One of her popular television acting came through comedy sitcom Nonavaruni Mahathvaruni with the role "Premachandra's mother". Some of her popular serials include, Asalwasiyo, Pramada Wadi, Gedara Bala, Hangi Hora and Hingana Kolla. Her final television serial was Wadadiya. While performing there, she was diagnosed with Alzheimer's disease.

== Death ==
Since 2008, she had had memory impairment. She had been in bed for two months and had not been cured despite her treatment of bed wounds. She also had diabetes. She was seriously ill in final years. But none of the artists called to help her or visit her. She died on 31 October 2013 from Alzheimer's disease. Funeral took place at Raddolugama Christian Cemetery without the participation of artists on 2 November 2013 at 3 pm.

== Filmography ==
Year	Film	Role	Ref.
1948	Weradunu Kurumanama		
1950	Hadisi Vinischaya	Padmini	
1951	Segawuu Pilithura	Leela	
1952	Umathu Wiswasaya	Vikata Manika	
1957	Siriyalatha	Carolina	
1968	Bicycle Hora		
1969	Pickpocket	Pukkala Mudalali's wife	
1971	Kathuru Muwath	Kathuru Muwath's lover	
1971	Seeye Nottuwa		
1972	Lokuma Hinawa	Regina	
1972	Ihatha Athmaya	Hilda	
1973	Aparadaya Ha Danduwama		
1974	Duleeka		
1975	Kaliyuga Kaale		
1976	Haratha Hathara		
1977	Neela		
1979	Jeewana Kandulu		
1979	Wasanthaye Dawasak	Kalu Ethano's shop goer	
1979	Akke Mata Awasara	Servant	
1981	Sathweni Dawasa		
1981	Jeewanthi		
1981	Bangali Walalu		
1982	Wathura Karaththaya	Garen	
1982	Rail Paara		
1983	Sandamali	Nimalawathie 'Nimala'	
1988	Sandakada Pahana	Head Nurse	
1996	Mal Hathai		
1999	Ayadimi Samaa	Granny	
2002	Onna Babo		
