= Surangani (film) =

- Directed by: Cyril P Abeyratne; Technical Director: Vembu
- Starring: Eddie Junior; D R Nanayakkara; Pearl Vasudevi; Kanthi Gunatunga
- Music by: T R Paapa
- Production company: Ceylon Theatres Ltd.
- Release date: 19 February 1955
- Country: Sri Lanka
- Language: Sinhala

Surangani is a 1955 Sri Lankan drama film directed by Cyril P. Abeyratne.

== Cast ==
- Kanthi Gunatunga as Ramya
- Eddie Junior as Sena
- D.R. Nanayakkara as Kuda
- Pearl Vasudevi
- Lilian Edirisinghe
- Disna Ranjani
- G. S. B. Rani as Aunt
- M P Gemunu
- Sujeeva Lalee
- Kingsley Jayasekera

== Production ==
The film was produced by The Ceylon Theatres Ltd. and was released on 19 February 1955 at Elphinstone (Maradana ) & 13 other centres through Ceylon Theatres circuit.

== Soundtrack ==
The music was composed by T. R. Paapa. Popular songs included

1. Aaley Pem Res Dahara – G. S. B. Rani Perera
2. Suranganaavi Maage
3. Sapaa Jeewey Uthum (Rupe Bale) – Dharmadasa Walpola
4. Koibatado Mey Sathaa – Eddie Junior
5. Seyaava Anduna Roopey
6. Kandukaraye Shantha Sandhyawe – Dharmadasa Walpola
7. Prem Santhapaye – Dharmadasa Walpola and G. S. B. Rani Perera
8. Deepey Sri Lanka Dilena – G. S. B. Rani Perera
