= David Dharmakeerthi =

Sri Lankan actor

David Dharmakeerthi ඩේවිඩ් ධර්මකීර්ති
- Born: Kalukapuge Don David; 1 September 1913; Padukka, Sri Lanka
- Died: 10 September 1987 (aged 74)
- Occupations: Actor, politician
- Years active: 1953–1987
- Spouse: Nandawathi Jayasuriya
- Children: 8
- Father: Odiris Appuhami

Kalukapuge Don David (born 1 September 1913 – died 10 September 1987 as ඩේවිඩ් ධර්මකීර්ති), popularly known as David Dharmakeerthi was an actor Sri Lankan early Sri Lankan cinema.

== Personal life ==
He was born on 1 September 1913 in Kotigamgoda village, Padukka. His father Odiris Appuhami was a farmer. He started school at village school and then from Wonakal College, Padukka and finally to the English School in Homagama. After school, Dharmakeerthi first joined the Department of Agriculture at Alston Place, Colombo as an overseer.

Dharmakeerthi was married to Nandawathi Jayasuriya. The couple has 5 sons and 3 daughters. He died on 10 September 1987 at the age of 74.

== Cinema career ==
In school times, he performed in a drama based on a novel "Rohini" written by Martin Wickremasinghe. There was a superintendent named Jasinghe in the Department of Agriculture where David worked. He saw Dharmakeerthi's acting skills in the dramas of the peasant army, who also produced the background music and art direction. Raja Tilakaratne, who was a Lake House Dinamina Journalist, is a relative of the superintendent Jasinghe. Jasinghe opened the cinema door to Dharmakeerthi. His first cinema acting came through 1953 film Sujatha directed by T. R. Sundaram. During his visit to the studio in India to film Sujatha, his father and friend T. Somasekaran both died.

He also worked as a film assistant director, dialogue writer and a story writer in 1958 film Salli Malli Salli. In this film he emerged as a character actor. In 1981, he acted in the film Aradhana as a merciful father. He won the Best Supporting Actor Award at the 1982 Sarasaviya Awards. for that acting. This was the only award he received in 35 years of film career. He acted with his son Sarath Dharmakeerthi in the 1984 film Parasathuro.

His final cinema appearance came through 1988 film Sagara Jalaya Madi Handuwa Oba Sanda directed by Sumitra Peries.

== Political career ==
His favorite political character was Philip Gunawardena. Dharmakeerthi contested for the Horana seat from the Mahajana Eksath Peramuna in the 1960 general election. However, he was placed third in the seat and received only 1555 votes.

== Filmography ==
Year	Film	Role	Ref.
1953	Sujatha	Mudali	
1953	Prema Tharagaya		
1954	Warada Kageda?		
1955	Seda Sulang	Sir Edward Palipana	
1958	Salli Malli Salli		
1958	Vana Mohini		
1959	Sirimali	Galgedera Mudalali	
1960	Pirimiyek Nisa		
1960	Sandesaya	Ekanayake 'Disawa'	
1961	Suvineetha Lalani		
1962	Suhada Divi Piduma	Ranatunga	
1963	Deepashika	Lucky's father	
1963	Sudu Sande Kalu Wala	Ralahamy	
1963	Gamperaliya	Kaisaruwaththe Muhandiram	
1964	Kala Kala De Pala Pala De		
1964	Sithaka Mahima		
1964	Sulalitha Sobani	Danapala Mudalali	
1964	Suba Sarana Sepa Sithe	Karolis 'Appu'	
1964	Samaje Api Okkoma Samanai		
1965	Hathara Maha Nidhanaya	Keerthisena	
1965	Landaka Mahima		
1966	Athulweema Thahanam		
1966	Mahadana Muththa	Mahadana Muththa	
1966	Kapatikama	Mr. Fernando	
1966	Seegiri Kashyapa	King Dhatusena	
1966	Senasili Suwaya	Loku Unnahe	
1967	Hathara Kendare		
1967	Iwasana Dana		
1968	Singithi Surathal		
1968	Akka Nago		
1968	Bicycle Hora		
1968	Indunila		
1968	Dehadaka Duka	Uncle	
1968	Punchi Baba	Mala's uncle	
1969	Kawuda Hari?	Mudalithuma	
1969	Prewesamwanna	Mr. Basnayake	
1969	Pancha		
1971	Kathuru Muwath	Don David Pathirana	
1972	Hathara Wate		
1972	Lokuma Hinawa	Renuka's Pappa	
1972	Ihatha Athmaya	Priyani's father	
1973	Suhada Pathuma	Siriwardena	
1973	Sinawai Inawai	Guru Sabha	
1973	Sunethra		
1975	Kokilayo		
1975	Sadhana		
1976	Madol Duwa	Mudalali	
1978	Veera Puran Appu	Gunnepana Arachchi	
1979	Divi Thibena Thuru		
1979	Hari Pudumai	Mahathun	
1980	Parithyagaya	Ralahamy	
1981	Baddegama	Mudalithana	
1981	Jeevanthi		
1981	Aradhana		
1984	Para Sathuro	Grand father	
1987	Kiwulegedara Mohottala	Elderly Nilame	
1988	Sagara Jala Madi Handuwa	Village Man	
1994	Ahas Maliga		
