= Manel Wanaguru =

Sri Lankan actress

- මානෙල් වානගුරු
- Born: Manel Chinthamani Wanaguru; 18 October 1951 (age 74); Colombo
- Occupation: Actress
- Years active: 1958–present
- Spouse: Ananda Wickramage (m. 1984)
- Children: 2
- Parents: Dudley Wanaguru (father); Indrani Dissanayake (mother)

Manel Chinthamani Wanaguru (Sinhala: මානෙල් වානගුරු; born 18 October 1951), is an actress in Sri Lankan cinema, theater, and television.

== Personal life ==
Manel Wanaguru was born on 18 October 1951. Her father Dudley Samuel Wanaguru was also an actor in Sinhala cinema. Dudley was born on 16 December 1922 and died on 29 July, 2003. He was a past pupil of St. Joseph's College, Wattala. He made his debut acting through film Eda Ra and then acted in many films such as Daiwa Wipakaya, Hadisi Vivahaya, Gehenu Geta and Patachara. He also directed the film Sengawunu Menika. Her mother was Indrani Dissanayake, who was a housewife. Manel has six siblings: Upendra, Lakshman, Tissa, Nihal, Tamara, and Rohan.

Wanaguru is married to Ananda Wickramage, who is also a renowned actor and comedian. The couple has two sons - Janith Wickramage and Sanketh Wickramage, both are actors.

== Acting career ==
=== Selected television serials ===
- Akuru Maki Na
- Anne
- Bath Amma
- Bindunu Sith
- Dedunnai Adare
- Dedunnen Eha
- Gimhana Tharanaya
- Girikula
- Hada Pudasuna
- Hoduwawa
- Kadulu Thahanchiya
- Kammiththa
- Kokila Ginna
- Maruk Mal
- Medagedara
- Mila
- Nadeeladiya
- Nisala Diya Sasala Viya
- Nonawaruni Mahathwaruni
- Patalawilla
- Paata Veeduru
- Pawani
- Pem Piyawara
- Pooja
- Prema Parami
- Rangamadala Samugani
- Rashmi
- Ruwan Sakmana
- Sahas Gaw Dura
- Salsapuna
- Sanda Nodutu Sanda
- Sanda Numba Nam
- Sasara Sarani
- Shaun
- Sihina Kumari
- Sihina Puraya
- Sivusiya Gawwa
- Urumaya Soya
- Visirunu Renu

=== Selected stage dramas ===
- Raja Kapilla
- Stella Setwela
- Su Saha Guru

== Filmography ==
Her maiden cinematic experience came through 1958 film Vanaliya directed by B.A.W. Jayamanne.

Key
†	Denotes films that have not yet been released

Year	Film	Role	Ref.
1958	Vanaliya		
1973	Sadahatama Oba Mage		
1973	Dahakin Ekek	Shyama's friend	
1974	Kasthuri Suwanda	Letchemi	
1974	Dinum Kanuwa		
1974	Wasthuwa		
1975	Hitha Honda Minihek	Caretaker	
1975	Cyril Malli		
1975	Kalu Diya Dahara		
1975	Pem Kurullo		
1975	Tharanga	Tharanga	
1975	Amaraneeya Adare		
1975	Kokilayo		
1975	Rajagedara Paraviyo		
1976	Nilla Soya	Nilmini 'Seetha' 'Meena'	
1977	Neela		
1977	Hithuwakkarayo		
1978	Tikira	Geetha	
1978	Sithaka Suwanda	Lillian	
1978	Asha Desin		
1978	Apsara		
1978	Kumara Kumariyo	Princey Ranawaka	
1979	Samanmalee	Kamini	
1979	Hari Pudumai	Rangan	
1980	Doctor Susantha		
1980	Seetha		
1980	Raktha		
1980	Sabeetha	Chamila	
1981	Sathkulu Pawwa	Nimal's sister	
1982	Sudu Ayya	Susee	
1982	Jeewithayen Jeewithayak		
1982	Rahasak Nathi Rahasak		
1982	Eka Diga Kathawak		
1982	Kiri Suwanda		
1983	Karate Joe		
1984	Ranmalige Wasanawa	Manel	
1984	Kokila	Manjula	
1984	Namal Renu		
1984	Hadawathaka Wedana		
1984	Birinda		
1985	Adarayaka Mahima	Seetha Pararajasekaram	
1985	Sudu Mama		
1985	Du Daruwo		
1986	Peralikarayo	Ivonne	
1987	Nommara Ekai	Sharada	
1989	Badulu Kochchiya		
1990	Jaya Shakthi		
1990	Walawwe Hamu		
1990	Pem Rajadahana		
1992	Okkoma Kanapita		
1992	Kulageya	Mervyn's elder sister	
1993	Mawila Penewi Roope Hade		
1993	Weli Sulanga	Kathy	
1994	Rajawanshen Ekek		
1995	Ira Handa Illa		
1997	Apaye Thappara Asu Haradahak		
1997	Goodbye Tokyo		
2001	Jolly Hallo	Brando's mother	
2002	Surapurata Kanyaviyak		
2002	Cheriyo Holman		
2003	Numba Nadan Apita Pissu	Sepalika's mother	
2006	Eka Malaka Pethi		
2006	Supiri Balawatha		
2010	Thank You Berty	Opal	
2010	Viyapath Bambara		
2011	Sweet Angel		
2011	Gamani	NGO Committee member	
2011	Putha Mage Suraya		
2012	Sihinaya Dige Enna	Manel	
2013	Peeter One	Dalryn	
2014	Que Sera		
2015	Sanjana		
2015	Lantin Singho	Rupawathi Meniyo	
2017	Hima Tharaka		
2017	Nilanjana	Shirani	
2017	Sellam Nethnam Lellam		
2018	Seya	Convent Nun	
2018	Athuru Mithuru Hari Apuru		
2023	Meka Puduma Kathawak		
TBA	Kidnap †		
TBA	Adarei Jaanu †		
TBA	Nuhuru Vaeyama †		

== Awards ==
=== Deepashika Awards ===
Year	Nominee / work	Award	Result
1974	Kasthuri Suwanda	Best Dramatic Performance	Won

=== Deepashika Awards ===
Year	Nominee / work	Award	Result
2021	Contribution to Cinema	U.W. Sumathipala Lifetime	Won
