= Minnalkodi =

1937 film directed by K. Amarnath

- Poster
- Directed by: K. Amarnath
- Produced by: Ramaniklal; Mohanlal
- Starring: K. T. Rukmini; Srinivasa Rao; S. S. Kokko
- Production company: Mohan Pictures
- Release date: 30 October 1937
- Running time: 158 minutes
- Country: India
- Language: Tamil

Minnalkodi (transl. Bolt of lightning) is a 1937 Indian Tamil-language action thriller film, directed by K. Amarnath and produced by Ramaniklal and Mohanlal. The film stars K. T. Rukmini, Srinivasa Rao, and S. S. Kokko (Real name: Pasupuleti Srinivasulu Naidu). Released on 30 October 1937, it became a commercial success, but no print of the film is known to survive, making it a lost film.

== Plot ==
Mohini is a young girl whose father dies. Her wily uncle unfairly takes her property, leaving her and her male servant homeless. In their wanderings, Mohini and the servant come across Minnalkodi, a dacoit, and protect him from the police. The injured Minnalkodi declares Mohini the leader of his gang and dies. Mohini goes about in the guise of a man as Minnalkodi and kills her uncle and others who had harmed her earlier, but she is a good thief who robs the rich only to help the poor. Jayakumar, a police inspector, tries to capture her but is unable to make much progress. In the jungle, he comes across Mohini, without her disguise, and falls in love with her. When he learns that she is, in fact, Minnalkodi, he persuades her to change her ways, and they marry.

== Production ==
Minnalkodi was among Tamil cinema's earliest action films, then known as "stunt films", and followed the Robin Hood concept of robbing the rich to help the poor. It was directed by K. Amarnath and produced by Ramaniklal and Mohanlal under Mohan Pictures, this being one of the Bombay-based company's earliest Tamil films. K. T. Rukmini, an Anglo-Indian actress, played Mohini. She modelled her screen mannerisms on the Hindi film actress Gohar Mamajiwala, and draped her sari in the Gujarati style. She also took influence from the acting style of Fearless Nadia. S. S. Koko, a stunt-comedian, played Mohini's servant. Srinivasa Rao played Jayakumar, the police inspector who falls in love with Mohini. Other supporting roles were played by Gogia Pasha, Subbulakshmi, Alamu, K. B. Rao and Usharani. Minnalkodi was filmed in black-and-white, featured only three songs, and its final length measured 14,205 feet (4,330 m).

== Release and reception ==
Minnalkodi was released on 30 October 1937 and emerged a major commercial success, besides propelling Rukmini to stardom. No print of the film is known to survive, making it a lost film.

== Bibliography ==
- Baskaran, S. Theodore (1996). The Eye of the Serpent: An Introduction to Tamil Cinema. Chennai: East West Books.
