= Kendriya Vidyalaya, Pattom =

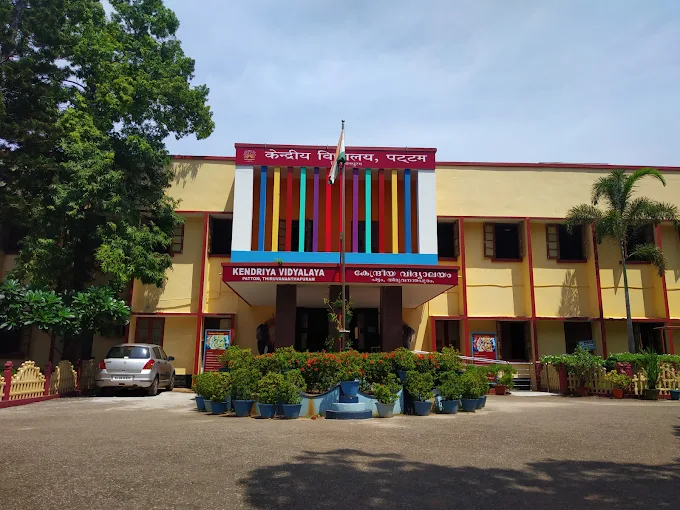

Location
- Kerala; India; 8.5205°N 76.9409°E

Information
- Type: Civil sector school
- Motto: तत् त्वं पूषन् अपावृणु (Tat tvam Pooshan Apaavrunu) (The face of Truth is covered by a golden vessel. Remove Thou, O Sun, that covering, for the law of Truth to behold.)
- Established: 1 July 1964
- Sister school: All Kendriya Vidyalayas across India
- School board: Central Board of Secondary Education(CBSE), KVS
- Authority: Kendriya Vidyalaya Sangathan
- School number: 79027
- School code: 1808
- Principal: R GIRI SANKARAN THAMPI
- Enrollment: 4100
- Campus size: ~5 acres
- Campus type: Urban
- Houses: Cauvery, Ganga, Krishna, Narmada
- Colors: Blue, Green, Red, Yellow
- Affiliation: CBSE, Kendriya Vidyalaya Sangathan

Kendriya Vidyalaya Pattom (KV Pattom) is a school in Pattom, Thiruvananthapuram, India. It was established in 1964 as a civil sector school affiliated to Central Board of Secondary Education.

KV Pattom runs with two shifts from Class I to Class XII, with around 2,200 students and 80 staff in shift-1, and 1,900 students and 50 staff in shift-2. The combined total across both shifts is approximately 4,100 students and 130 staff.

== History ==
In 1964, the Government of Kerala donated five acres to build KV Pattom. The first phase of construction, including the main secondary block, was completed in 1968, and the school began operations the same year. In 1969, the first batch of Class XI students completed their higher secondary education.

In 1977, KV Pattom started the "10+2" system. In 1982 a new science block was opened.

In 1996, KV Pattom was declared as a Model KV. In 1998, the primary block was inaugurated. On 10 September 2004, the second shift was introduced.

In April 2008, KV Pattom inaugurated a fully automated library. In 2009 the school won the KVS-Intel Technology in Education Award for Schools. In 2010, the Online Academic Social Networking Project Library Junction won the NCERT National Innovation and Experimentation Award.

KV Pattom was ranked as the Best Govt Day School in the country by Education World in 2015, 2016, 2017 and 2020.

In August 2021 the librarian, S L Faisal, was awarded the National Teacher's Award, which is one of the most prestigious and coveted recognition given to the meritorious teachers in primary, middle, and secondary schools in India, for his services in redesigning the concept of school libraries and enabling the students to acquire skills through innovative learning programs.

== Alumni ==
- Thushara G S Pillai (scientist)
- Keerthy Suresh (actor)
- C.S. Sudha (judge)

== Gallery ==
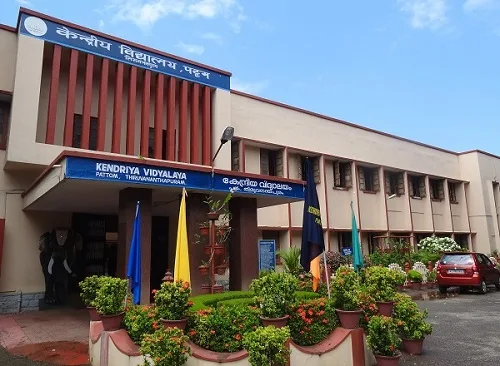

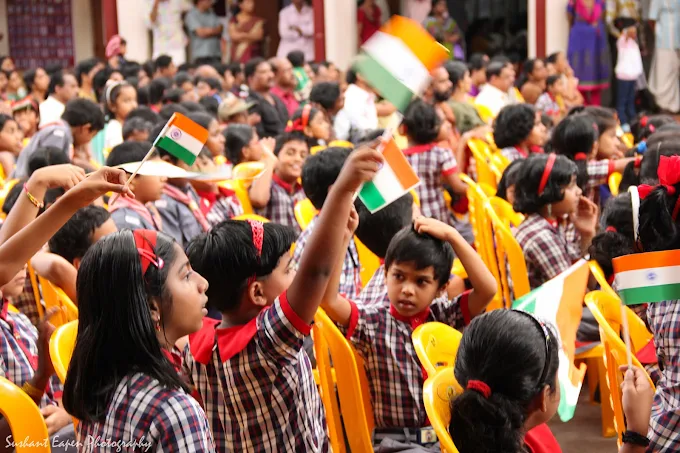

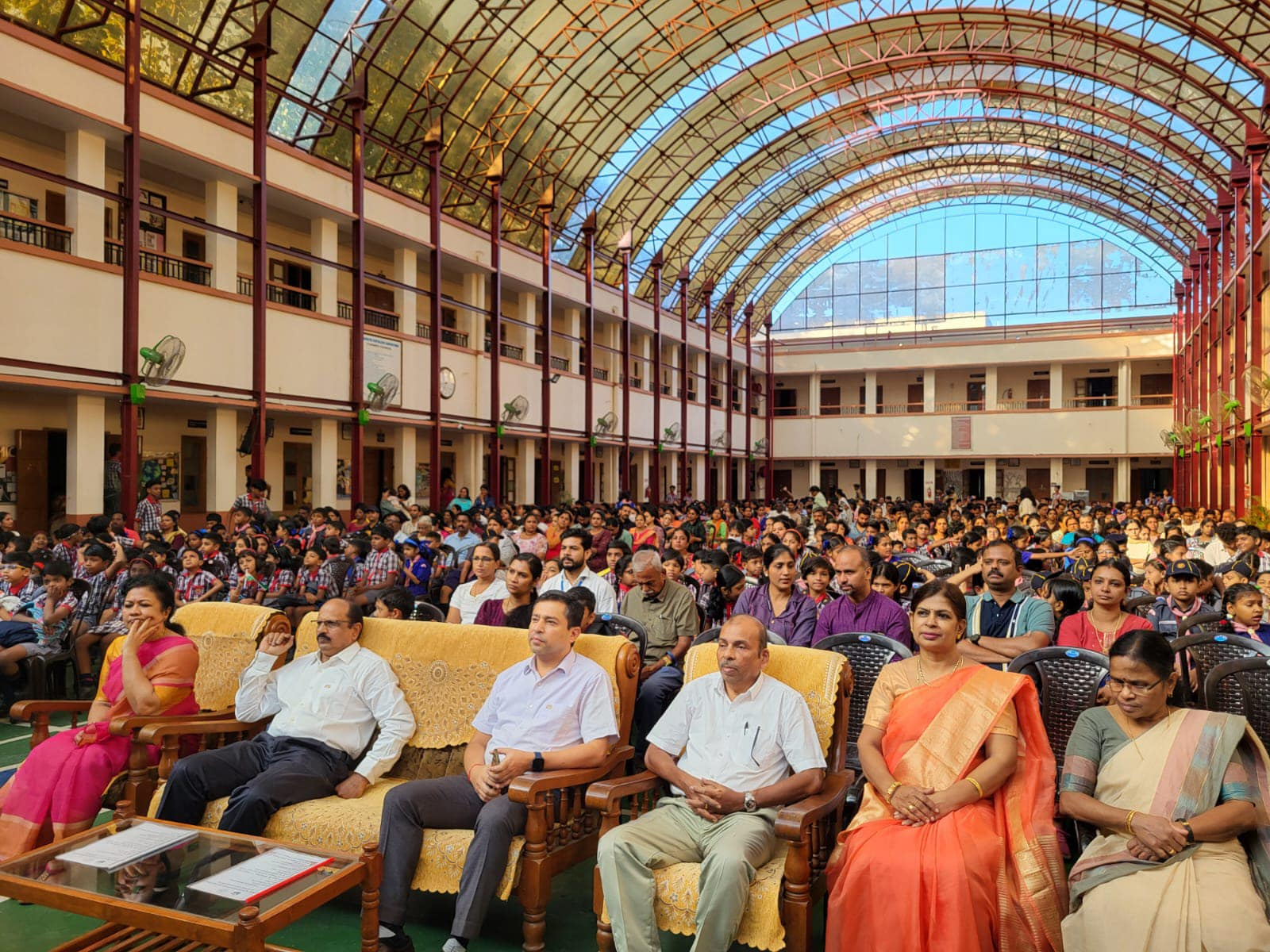

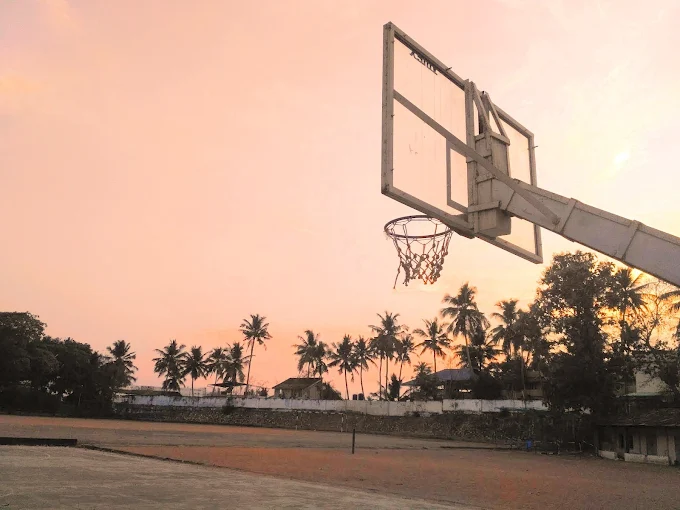
