= Tocharian =

Tocharian may refer to:

- Tocharian languages, Indo-European languages formerly spoken in the Tarim Basin
- Tocharian script, the script used to write the Tocharian languages
- Tocharians, the ancient people who spoke these languages
- Tocharian clothing, clothing worn by those people
- Tochari, an ancient people of Bactria mentioned in Greco-Roman sources

== See also ==
- Tushar (disambiguation)
