= Leena de Silva =

Sri Lankan actress and filmmaker (1936–2023)

- ලීනා ද සිල්වා
- Born: Liyanage Don Leena Piyasili de Silva; 30 October 1936; Colombo, British Ceylon
- Died: 1 December 2023 (aged 87); Toronto, Ontario, Canada
- Education: Ananda Balika Vidyalaya, Kotte
- Occupations: Actress, Director
- Years active: 1954–2001
- Spouse: Ravindra Rupasena (m. 1960; died 1978)
- Children: 2
- Parents: Don Simon de Silva (father); Alice Silva (mother)

Liyanage Don Leena Piyasili de Silva (Sinhala: ලියනගේ දොන් ලීනා පියසිලි ද සිල්වා; 30 October 1936 – 1 December 2023), popularly referred to as Leena de Silva (Sinhala: ලීනා ද සිල්වා), was a Sri Lankan actress who worked in Sri Lankan cinema, theatre and television. One of the earliest pillars of Sri Lankan cinema, de Silva contributed many critically acclaimed films of her generation, with a career spanning more than six decades.

== Personal life ==
Liyanage Don Leena Piyasili de Silva was born on 30 October 1936 in Maligakanda, Colombo. Her father, Don Simon de Silva worked as a supervisor at Ceylon Cargo Board Company. Her mother was Alice Silva. She had two sisters, Trilicia Kusuma and Merlyn Thilaka and one brother, Jayampath Sam. She completed education from Ananda Balika Vidyalaya, Kotte.

De Silva was married to fellow actor Ravindra Rupasena from 11 November 1960 to his death in 1978. She met Rupasena during her maiden film Ahankara Sthree and then the couple appeared in many films together, including Surathali, Sohoyuro, Sundara Birinda, Suneetha and Nalagana. The couple had one son and one daughter. Her son, Bimal Yoga Sri was born on 13 September 1961, and her daughter Poorna Priyadarshani was born on 1 June 1963. Poorna is a talented lyricist.

Rupasena's younger sister was married to film producer Stanley de Silva. Rupasena had one brother, W.A. Keerthisena. Rupasena died from heart attack on 15 April 1978 at the age of 49. At the time of his death, he was working as a Planner at the Irrigation Department in Colombo. Leena moved to Canada in 1991 and lived in Pickering, Ontario, with her children.

=== Death ===
De Silva died on 1 December 2023, at the age of 87. She was living in Toronto, Ontario, at the time, and had two children.

== Career ==
In the English class of school, de Silva played the lead role in the play Pipe Piper Model. It was her first performance on stage. During school times at the age of 12, she learned dancing from renowned dancer and actor Shesha Palihakkara, who introduced Leena on to the cinema screen. Her maiden cinematic appearance came through 1954 film Ahankara Sthree along with her future husband Ravindra Rupasena while in grade 9 at the school. She performed a dance sequence as Lanka Matha in it. Then Cyril P. Abeyratne was looking for an artiste to play the lead female role in his film Surathali in 1956. In 1955, she won the fifth place at the "Panch Kalyani beauty pageant".

Her husband introduced her to Abeyratne and she acted in his film later that year. She was introduced to Dr. Lester James Peries by guru Palihakkara to act in his film Rekava. However, due to offence from school principal and father, she refused to act in the movie. However, due to sudden death of her husband, de Silva quit from acting for two years and returned with 1980 film Ganga Addara. She acted in many popular films such as, Sundara Birinda, Kele Mal, Awaragira and Yahalu Yeheli. Leena was lucky enough to act along with Rukmani Devi in the film Nalangana.

Apart from cinema, de Silva also acted in a few stage dramas such as Thattu Gewal, Dolosweni Raathriya and Julius Caesar. She also appeared in television serials Selalihini Gammanaya, Sudu Parewiyo, Himi Ahimi and Uda Gira. While in Canada, de Silva directed the teleserial Ratakin Ratakata.

== Filmography ==
Year	Film	Role	Ref.
1954	Ahankara Sthree	Lanka Matha Dancer	
1956	Surathali	Surathali	
1958	Sohoyuro		
1958	Suneetha	Suneetha	
1960	Sundara Birinda	Rupa	
1960	Nalangana		
1964	Sulalitha Sobani	Shanthi 'Sobani'	
1964	Sujage Rahasa		
1967	Ran Rasa	Indrani	
1980	Ganga Addara	Attapattu 'Hamine'	
1981	Valampuri		
1981	Aradhana		
1981	Saaranga		
1982	Kele Mal	Nanda	
1982	Kiri Suwanda	Mother-in-law	
1982	Malata Noena Bambaru		
1982	Paaramitha		
1982	Yahalu Yeheli	Mrs. Wanigasekara	
1983	Kaliyugaya		
1983	Samanala Sihina		
1984	Hithawathiya	Sarath's mother	
1985	Adara Kathawa		
1985	Kirimadu Wal		
1985	Varsity Kella	Mrs. Siriweera	
1986	Peralikarayo	Tanuja	
1986	Dushyanthi	Kiri Manika	
1986	Koti Waligaya		
1986	Sinha Pataw		
1986	Dinuma	Chandra	
1988	Chandingeth Chandiya		
1989	Sebaliyo		
1989	Sirimedura	Nirmala's sister	
1989	Badulu Kochchiya		
1990	Thanha Asha	Mother	
1990	Veera Udara		
1991	Raja Kello		
1991	Raja Daruwo	Asilina 'Leena'	
1994	Sujatha	Seetha Rajasuriya	
1995	Awaragira	Kusuma	
1996	Seema Pawuru		
2000	Anuragaye Ananthaya	Shanthi	
2001	Poronduwa	Ajith's mother	
