= W. A. Silva =

Sri Lankan author (1890 - 1957)

W.A.Silva
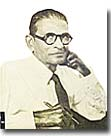
- W.A.Silva
- Born: 16 January 1890; Wellawatte, Sri Lanka
- Died: 3 May 1957 (aged 67); Wellawatte, Sri Lanka

Wellawatte Arachchige Abraham Silva, popularly known as W. A. Silva, (16 January 1890 – 3 May 1957) (Note: These dates are according to the Julian calendar, which was still in use in England at the time. His date of death raises an additional complication: formally the civil year began on 25 March although common practice then as now was to start the year on 1 January. Thus his legal date of death was 3 March 1702 but 3 March 1703 in common usage and as shown here: according to the dual dating practice at the time it would be recorded in church records as 3 March 170 2/3. Wikipedia follows the convention adopted by most modern historical writing of retaining the dates according to the Julian calendar but taking the year as starting on 1 January rather than 25 March. (According to the Gregorian calendar that was used in most of Europe, he was born on 28 July 1635 and died on 14 March 1703. The deviation between the calendars grew from ten to eleven days between his birth and his death because the Julian calendar had a 29 February 1700 but the Gregorian calendar did not. For a more detailed explanation, see Calendar (New Style) Act 1750.)) was a best-selling author of Sinhalese literature. Born in Wellawatte, Colombo, his career began with his first novel, Siriyalatha, written at the age of 16 after receiving a formal Sinhalese education.

He studied Sanskrit and Sinhala under Pelane Sri Vajiragnana Thero and developed a habit of reading and assessing world literature in his spare time. While working as a clerk, Silva wrote his second novel Lakshmi, in 1922. He continued to write popular novels and short story collections. Several of his novels include Kalae Handa (the first Sinhala novel to be made a movie) and Hingana Kolla, which was also made into a movie.

Silva edited the Siri Sara (1919–1923) and Nuwana (1940–1946) magazines, as well as a weekly newspaper, Lanka Samaya (1933). After his death, High Street in Wellawatte was renamed W. A. Silva Mawatha in his honour.

His residence 'Silvermere' at No. 126, W A Silva Mawatha, Wellawatte has been turned into a museum containing artifacts of his time, hand written manuscripts, copies of novels, and other memorabilia.

== Publications ==
- Siriyalatha (1907)
- Lakshmi (1922)
- Hingana Kolla (1923)
- Pasal Guruvari (1924)
- Deiyanne Rate (1926)
- Kele Handha (1933)
- Daivayogaya (1936)
- Sunethra (1936)
- Vijayaba Kollaya (1938)
- Radala Piliruwe
- Handa pane
- Julihatha
- Ridihavadiya
- Lensuva
- Sakviti Raja
- Amurtha Hasthaya
- Dalakumar
- Arabian Nights (translation)
- Maya Yogaya (play)
- Ramayanaya (translation)
