= Sweet Angel (film) =

- Sinhala: ස්වීට් ඒන්ජල්
- Directed by: Eranga Senaratne
- Written by: Eranga Senaratne
- Produced by: Lionel Films
- Starring: Suresh Gamage; Deepa Chandi; Manel Wanaguru
- Cinematography: Daya Sooriyarachchi
- Edited by: Wiranga Katipearachchi
- Music by: Madhava Hawawasam; Lassana Jayasekara
- Distributed by: NFC Circuit
- Release date: 8 July 2011
- Running time: 103 minutes
- Country: Sri Lanka
- Language: Sinhala

Sweet Angel (Sinhala: ස්වීට් ඒන්ජල්) is a 2011 Sri Lankan Sinhala drama thriller film directed by Nishantha Weerasingha and produced by Susan Fernando for Lionel Films. It stars Suresh Gamage and new coming actress Deepa Chandi in lead roles along with Manel Wanaguru and Sanju Rodrigo. Music co-composed by Madhava Hawawasam and Lassana Jayasekara. It is the 1159th Sri Lankan film in the Sinhala cinema.

== Cast ==
- Deepa Chandi as Manjari
- Suresh Gamage as Wenura
- Bimsath Ge Kurulu as Roneth
- Manel Wanaguru
- Susan Fernando
- Wasantha Kumaravila
- Sanju Rodrigo
- Rohani Weerasinghe
- Sarath Kulanga
- Anusha Rajapaksa
- Kapila Sigera
- Nilmini Kottegoda
- Gihani Amerasena

== Soundtrack ==
No.	Title	Singer(s)	Length
1.	"Muwa Goluwela"	Prabuddha Geetharuchi
2.	"Sihina Manamali"	Suresh Gamage
