= Meka Puduma Kathawak =

- Sinhala: මේක පුදුම කතාවක්
- Directed by: Lal Priyadeva
- Written by: Lal Priyadeva
- Produced by: Sunil T. Films
- Starring: Chilli Thilanka; Rex Kodippili; Manel Wanaguru; Kelum Sri; Teddy Vidyalankara
- Cinematography: Janith Gunasekara
- Edited by: Danal Thiranjana
- Music by: Jayamal Samantha Fernando
- Distributed by: EAP Theatres
- Release date: 16 December 2023
- Running time: 110 minutes
- Country: Sri Lanka
- Language: Sinhala

Meka Puduma Kathawak (Sinhala: මේක පුදුම කතාවක්, lit. 'This is an amazing story') is a 2023 Sri Lankan Sinhalese language horror thriller film directed by Lal Priyadeva and produced by Sunil T. Fernando for Sunil T. Films. It stars Chilli Thilanka in his first lead role along with Rex Kodippili, Manel Wanaguru, Kelum Sri, Rajitha Rodrigo and Teddy Vidyalankara in supportive roles.

== Cast ==
- Chilli Thilanka as police officer
- Kanchana Kaan as Sonali
- Rex Kodippili
- Manel Wanaguru
- Teddy Vidyalankara as thug
- Kelum Sri as Pahan Sandeepa Ekanayake
- Dulee Fernando
- Rajitha Rodrigo
- Saman Almeida as Kattadiya
- Sripali Hettiarachi as Saubhagya Chaturangani
- Lasni Samalka
- Sugath Janaka
- Hiruni Ranasinghe
- Kavitha Anjali
- Thushani Dinushka
- Ann Minoshi
- Mahesh Randeniya
- Mahinda Ihalagama
- Samanthi Higurage
- Lithumi Amaya
- Baweesha Rasarthi
- Sunali Ratnayake
- Pamudi Abeykoon
- Buddhika Hasitha
- Chandu Imbulana
- Senura Abhishek

== Production ==
This is the 14th film directed by Lal Priyadeva and 73rd film production by Sunil T. Fernando. Priyadeva also made dialogues and screenplay of the film. Tushara Perera made co-production along with Sunil T. Fernando. Music is directed by Jayamal Samantha Fernando and Sunil Dharmasiri is the lyricist. Janith Gunasekara made cinematography and Danal Thiranjana contributed with editing and color grading.

The Muhurath ceremony was held at Thalawathugoda STV Network in November 2021. The film was released on 16 December 2023 in EAP Theatres during the "Savoy Cinema Festival 2023". Oh the next day, the film was released through Peo TV, which became the first film to be released in both theatre and television at the same time in Sri Lanka.
