= Amma (1949 film) =

- Directed by: Sirisena Wimalaweera
- Screenplay by: Sirisena Wimalweera (story, play, and screenplay); Krishnan (screenplay)
- Produced by: Navajeewana Film Co. (company)
- Starring: Eddie Junior; Pearl Vasudevi; D. R. Nanayakkara; N. R. Dias
- Music by: C. N. Pandurangan
- Release date: August 19, 1949
- Country: Sri Lanka
- Language: Sinhala

Amma is a 1949 Sri Lankan film directed by Sirisena Wimalaweera. It was adapted from one of his plays that bore the same name. The cast included Eddie Junior, Pearl Vasudevi, D. R. Nanayakkara and N. R. Dias and was filmed at the Neptune Studio in Madras, India.

It was screened at the Central Cinema in Maradana.

== Plot ==
Story involving a mother.

== Cast ==
- Pearl Vasudevi as Nila: lead female character
- D. R. Nanayakkara as Saranapala
- Eddie Junior as Tilaka: lead male character
- Upasena Wimalaweera as Young Tilaka
- Murin Nissanka as Viola
- R. Marshal Perera as Romeo
- Carmen Vanidoti as Juliet
- N. R. Dias as Juwanis
- R. H. Nicholas Perera as Jomi
- Sumana Ranasinghe as Noiyahami
- Turin Silva
- Asilin Ranasinghe
- S. H. Jothipala as Samson

== Songs ==
- "Harida Viman" – Pearl Vasudevi
- "Dawasak Da (virindu)" – Upasena Wimalaweera
- "Jeevitha Yatho" – Pearl Vasudevi
- "Kama Deiyange Rupe" – D. R. Nanayakkara and Murin Nissanka
- "Paya Wala Gabi" – Upasena Wimalweera and female cast member
- "Mang Paninewa Kalani Gange" – R. Marshal Perera and Carmen Vanidoti
- "Gala Kadagena" – N. R. Dias
- "Hawa Pare Durai" – B. F. de Silva and Eddie Junior
- "Marga Erelana" – D. R. Nanayakkara
- "Karadara Bariye" – R. H. Nicholas Perera and Sumana Ranasinghe
