= Ravindra Rupasena =

Sri Lankan actor (1929–1978)

- Born: 1929; Sri Lanka
- Died: 15 April 1978 (aged 49)
- Education: Nalanda College Colombo
- Years active: 1954–1978
- Known for: Film Acting
- Spouse: Leena de Silva
- Children: 2

Ravindra Rupasena (Sinhala:රවීන්ද්‍ර රූපසේන) (1929 – 15 April 1978) was an actor in Sri Lankan cinema.

== Personal life and education ==
Rupasena was educated at Nalanda College Colombo.

Rupasena was married to fellow popular actress, Leena de Silva from 11 November 1960 to his death in 1978. He met Leena during his maiden film Ahankara Sthree and then the couple appeared in many films together, including Surathali, Sohoyuro, Sundara Birinda, Suneetha and Nalagana. The couple has one son and one daughter. Rupasena died on 15 April 1978 from a sudden heart attack at the age of 49.

== Career ==
Rupasena made his maiden cinematic appearance through the 1954 film Ahankara Sthree directed by A.B. Raja. Then he continued to act in many popular movies including, Surathali, Sundara Birinda and Sujage Rahasa. He made his final cinema appearance in 1967 with the film Amathala Unada directed by D.M. Daas.

== Filmography ==
Year	Film	Role	Ref.
1954	Ahankara Sthree	Sukumal 'Daya'	
1956	Surathali	Sudath	
1958	Sohoyuro		
1958	Daskama		
1958	Suneetha		
1960	Sundara Birinda	Sunil	
1960	Nalangana	Sunil	
1964	Sulalitha Sobani	Keerthi	
1964	Sujage Rahasa		
1967	Amathala Unada		
