= Dudley Wanaguru =

Sri Lankan actor (1924–2002)

Dudley Wanaguru ඩඩ්ලි වානගුරු
- Born: Don Samuel Dudley Wanaguru; 16 December 1924; Colombo, Sri Lanka
- Died: 3 April 2002 (aged 77); London, England
- Education: Saint Joseph's College, Colombo; Ananda College
- Occupations: Actor, director
- Years active: 1952–1982
- Relatives: N. M. Perera (cousin); Ananda Wickramage (son-in-law)

Don Samuel Dudley Wanaguru (16 December 1924 – 3 April 2002 Sinhala: ඩඩ්ලි වානගුරු), popularly known as Dudley Wanaguru was an actor in Sri Lankan cinema.

== Personal life ==
Dudley was born on 16 December 1924 in Grandpass, Colombo, Sri Lanka. His father, Don Martolis Wanaguru, was a renowned Sinhala physician born into a traditional medical family in Hokandara. Martolis studied medicine at the Colombo Ayurveda College and was an expert in fracture medicine. Dudley's mother Nanayakkara Pathirajage Rosalyn Perera, was from Kosgas Junction, Grandpass. She was a close relative of renowned politician, Minister of Finance and Leader of the Lanka Sama Samaja Party, Nanayakkara Pathirajage Martin Perera popularly known as Dr. N. M. Perera. Dudley had one brother: Jayashantha, and two sisters: Nandawathi, Chandrawathi.

Dudley received his primary education at Grandpass St. Joseph's College and his secondary education at Ananda College, Colombo. Then he passed the London English Matriculation Examination with distinction and was first appointed as an English Assistant Teacher. After few years, he became a police inspector attached to the Ceylon Police Service. Due to his love for cinema, he became the cinema manager and an executive in charge of cinemas at Ceylon Theaters.

He was married to Indani Dissanayake, who was from Mahara. The couple has seven children: Upendra, Lakshman, Manel, Tissa, Nihal, Tamara, Rohan. Lakshman 'Lucky' Wanaguru was an actor who acted in several films such as Vanarayo, Kokilayo and Segawunu Menika. Manel Wanaguru a popular actress in Sri Lankan cinema, television and theater with a career spanning for more than six decades. She first appeared as a child actor in the film Vanaliya in 1958 directed by B. A. W. Jayamanne. Manel is married to fellow dramatist Ananda Wickramage since 1984. The couple has two sons: Janith Abhishek and Sanketh Abhilash, both are actors.

He died on 3 April 2002 in England at the age of 77.

== Career ==
Around 1952, he was the manager of the Maradana Tower Theater, where he met Shanti Kumar Seneviratne. After that incidence, Dudley got the opportunity to play the brother of Sita Jayawardena, who played the lead role of Chandra in Seneviratne's 1953 film Eda Ra. Since then, Dudley has starred in several films, balancing work and acting. Some of his popular films include, Daiva Vipākaya (1956), Daskama (1959), Gæhænu Gæṭa, Hadisi Vivāhaya (1959), "Naḷangana (1960), Jeevita Pūjāva (1961) and Paṭāchārā (1964).

In 1967, he made his directorial debut Segawunu Menika, where he also made the script. In this film, his daughter Manel entered mainstream cinema with the role of a doctor. Then he appeared in many supportive roles in the films, Samanala Kumariyō Samanga Api Kavadat Surayō (1971), Dāhakin Ekek (1973), Hāratha Hathara (1976), Magē Nangi Shyāmā (1975), Unnath Dāhayi Maḷat Dāhayi (1976), Hithuvot Hituvāmayi (1977), Chaṇḍi Shyāmā (1982) and Hellō Shyamā (1982). Then, Dudley emigrated to England in 1980 and later worked at Heathrow Airport in London. Dudley has acted only in one television serial, Sasara Duka directed by B. A. W. Jayamanne.

== Filmography ==
Year	Film	Roles	Ref.
1953	Eda Ra	Chandra's brother	
1956	Daiva Vipakaya	Manager	
1958	Daskama		
1959	Gehenu Geta	Keerthi Bandara	
1959	Hadisi Vivahaya	Michael	
1960	Nalangana	Police officer	
1961	Jeewitha Poojawa		
1964	Patachara		
1966	Seyawak Pasupasa		
1967	Segawunu Menika	Director, screenwriter	
1971	Samanala Kumariyo		
1973	Dahakin Ekek	Ranatunga	
1975	Mage Nangi Shyama		
1976	Unnath Dahayi Malath Dahayi		
1976	Haratha Hathara		
1977	Hithuvoth Hithuvamai		
1978	Chandi Shyama		
1978	Slave of the Cannibal God	Government officer	
1981	Eka Dawasak Ra	Hamu Mahathaya	
1982	Hello Shyama		
