= Sonia Disa =

Sri Lankan actress and producer

Sonia Disa සෝනියා දිසා
- Born: Mary Felicia Perera; June 7, 1944 (age 82); Kotahena, Colombo
- Other name: Sonia Dissanayake
- Occupations: Actress, Producer, Costume designer
- Years active: 1962–2009
- Spouse: Karu Dissanayake (m. 1964)
- Children: 2

Mary Felicia Perera (born June 7, 1944, සෝනියා දිසා) [Sinhala]), popularly known as Sonia Dissanayake or known professionally as Sonia Disa, is a former actress in Sri Lankan cinema. Starting her career in 1962, Disa became one of the most popular film actresses in Sri Lanka in the 1970s and 1980s. Apart from acting, she also produced 17 films and worked as a costume designer.

== Personal life ==
Disa was born on 7 June 1944 in Kotahena, Colombo as Mary Felicia Perera. She was married to Karu Dissanayake, who was also a film actor and made his film debut with Soorayangeth Sooraya, later acting in popular films including Weli Kathara, Thushara and Janaka Saha Manju. He died on 17 November 2009. Disa lives in Australia with her two children, Udaya and Harshani, and her three grandchildren.

In 2017, Sonia was hospitalized due to a sudden heart attack. She recovered successfully after surgery.

== Career ==
Disa was introduced to cinema by Anthony C. Perera at the age of 19. He brought Sonia into Titus Thotawatte and she acted as "club girl" in his 1962 film Chandiya. Her major cinematic breakthrough came through a supporting role in the 1964 film Heta Pramada Wadi, directed by Shantha Kumar Senevirathna. Some of her most popular films are Soorayangeth Sooraya, Thusara, Sadahatama Oba Magai and Janaka Saha Manju.

During the shooting of 1976 film Nedeyo, Sonia was severely injured when acting a scene in a car. She was admitted to the hospital in a comatose state and relieved after seven days. One of her eyes was severely damaged and the vision was lost in that eye. It took one year and six months for her to recover completely. Disa won the Best Supporting Actress award for her role in Obata Divura Kiyannam at Sarasavi Film Festival and Best Supporting Actress award for her role in Devduwa at the Presidential award festival.

Disa acted with Gamini Fonseka in 15 films, which enabled her to play in different levels in Sinhalese cinema. She acted in many villainous roles opposite Malini Fonseka. She then started to act in more dramatic roles which commenced with Jeewana Ganga directed by Dayananda Rodrigo. Finally, she was acted in many motherly roles in blockbuster movies such as Thaththai Puthai, Raja Wadakarayo, Hitha Honda Chandiya and Mamai Raja. With many western roles, her name was transferred to stage name Sonia Disa by Tissa Abeysekara.

In 1986, she produced her maiden cinema production Jaya Apatai along with Sunil T. Fernando.

In 2004, Disa celebrated 40 years of her cinema career with a grand ceremony at the BMICH. After 20 years, she acted in Dayaratne Ratagedara's poya day single episode teledrama Mudukku.

== Arrest ==
16 February 2015, Disa was arrested by the Slave Island police for trespassing on the Nava Sama Samaja Party office premises at Barrack road Colombo 2. She charged that her house was unlawfully acquired by Wickramabahu Karunaratne. She also stated that the building was given to former minister Vasudeva Nanayakkara twenty years ago. However, six people including Disa, were produced before the Fort Magistrate Court. She was released on bail by the Colombo Fort Magistrate’s Court on 18 February 2015.

== Filmography ==
=== As actress ===
Year	Film	Role	Ref.
1964	Heta Pramada Wadi	Garjana Kumara's Daughter	
1965	Chandiya		
1966	Oba Dutu Da		
1968	Bicycle Hora		
1969	Kohomada Wede		
1969	Mee Masso		
1969	Prawesamwanna	Sonia	
1969	Paara Walalu		
1969	Hari Maga	Samanthi	
1969	Soorayangeth Sooraya		
1970	Ohoma Hondada	Kanthi	
1970	Suli Sulan		
1971	Poojithayo	Item song	
1971	Abirahasa	Opening bargoer	
1971	Sahanaya		
1972	Miriguwa		
1972	Edath Sooraya Adath Sooraya	Jiggie	
1973	Sadahatama Oba Mage		
1973	Hondai Narakai		
1973	Hondata Hondai	Ramani	
1973	Thushara	Sonia	
1973	Hondama Welawa		
1974	Sahayata Danny		
1974	Mehema Harida		
1974	Jeewana Ganga		
1974	Onna Babo Billo Enawa	Joe's lover	
1975	Hitha Honda Minihek	Sriya	
1975	Amaraneeya Adare		
1975	Gijulihiniyo		
1976	Pradeepe Ma Wewa		
1976	Harima Badu Thunak	Monica Kulatilaka	
1976	Hariyata Hari	Punchi Nona	
1976	Nedeyo	Kumuduni	
1976	Kawuda Raja	Sudha	
1977	Deviyani Oba Kohida?	Mother in Urban Area	
1977	Chin Chin Nona		
1977	Aege Adara Kathawa	Sudu Manike	
1978	Janaka Saha Manju	Champika Nandadeva	
1978	Sasara	Kanthi	
1978	Sandawata Ran Tharu		
1979	Monarathenna	Sriya	
1979	Sawudan Jema	Nokki	
1979	Geheniyak	Sirimali 'Mali'	
1979	Hingana Kolla	Marian Samarasinghe	
1979	Subhani		
1980	Uthumaneni	Siripala's lover	
1980	Tak Tik Tuk	Nilanthi	
1980	Anuhasa		
1980	Adara Rathne	Nirmala	
1980	Doctor Susantha		
1980	Raktha	Thara	
1980	Miyurige Kathawa		
1981	Bangali Walalu		
1981	Sathweni Dawasa	Wanrakka	
1981	Amme Mata Samawenna	Sheela	
1981	Jeewanthi	Priyanga	
1982	Wathura Karaththaya	Mother	
1982	Thakkita Tharikita		
1982	Miss Mallika		
1982	Rail Paara	Rail Guard's wife	
1982	Rahasak Nathi Rahasak		
1982	Kele Mal		
1982	Kadawunu Poronduwa	Tekla	
1983	Ran Mini Muthu		
1983	Monarathenna 2		
1983	Chuttey	Sumana	
1983	Senehasaka Kandulu	Selli	
1983	Loku Thaththa		
1983	Mal Madhu		
1983	Sister Mary	Sister Mary	
1984	Ammai Duwai		
1984	Thaththai Puthai	Saliya's mother	
1984	Hadawathaka Wedana		
1985	Channai Kello Dennai		
1985	Raththaran Kanda		
1985	Aeya Waradida Oba Kiyanna		
1985	Obata Diwura Kiyannam	Silawathie	
1986	Dushyanthi	Seeta Kumari	
1986	Devduwa		
1986	Jaya Apatai		
1987	Raja Wadakarayo	Ramesh's mother	
1987	Hitha Honda Chandiya	Jinney's mother	
1987	Ahinsa	Party guest	
1988	Amme Oba Nisa		
1988	Ko Hathuro		
1989	Mamai Raja	Nanda Ranatunga	
1989	Obata Rahasak Kiyannam		
1989	Sinasenna Raththaran		
1989	Randenigala Sinhaya	Raju's mother	
1990	Yukthiyata Wada	Sujatha	
1990	Veera Udara		
1990	Chandi Raja		
1991	Raja Sellan		
1991	Esala Sanda		
1991	Uthura Dakuna		
1991	Raja Kello		
1991	Ran Hadawatha		
1991	Alibaba Saha Horu 40		
1991	Bambara Kalapaya		
1992	Ranabime Veeraya		
1992	Oba Mata Wiswasai	Veerabahu's wife	
1992	Sakwithi Raja		
1992	Chandi Rejina		
1993	Ottui Beruwata		
1993	Lassanai Balanna		
1993	Lassanai Balanna		
1995	Wasana Wewa		
1995	Chandiyage Putha	Manamperiyage Silawathie Perera	
1995	Aege Wairaya		
1995	Edath Chandiya Adath Chandiya		
1995	Dalulana Gini		
1995	Inspector Geetha	Nalika	
1995	Dewiyani Sathya Surakinna	Shanthi	
1996	Raththaran Malli		
1997	Aege Wairaya 2		
1998	Aege Wairaya 3		
1998	Sexy Girl		
1999	Unusum Rathriya		
1999	Koti Sana	Koti Sana's mother	
2000	Aege Wairaya 4		
2000	Salupata Ahasata		
2000	Kauda Bole Alice	Hilda Nona	
2001	Hai Baby Hai		
2002	Sansara Prarthana		
2009	Thushara	Sampath's mother	

=== As producer ===
Year	Film
1986	Jaya Apatai
1988	Ko Hathuro
1989	Mamai Raja
1990	Chandi Raja
1992	Chandi Rejina
1992	Sakwithi Raja
1993	Lassanai Balanna
1995	Wasana Wewa
1995	Chandiyage Putha
1995	Edath Chandiya Adath Chandiya
1995	Dalulana Gini
1996	Raththaran Malli
1997	Aege Wairaya 2
1997	Aege Wairaya 3
1998	Sexy Girl
1999	Koti Sana
1999	Unusum Rathriya

=== As costume designer ===
Year	Film
1996	Raththaran Malli
