= Thushara Fernando =

Sri Lankan cricketer (born 1982)

Personal information
- Born: September 18, 1982 (age 44); Panadura, Sri Lanka
- Batting: Right-handed
- Bowling: Right-arm leg break

Career statistics
Competition	First-class	List A
Matches	8	9
Runs scored	216	42
Batting average	16.61	4.66
100s/50s	0/0	0/0
Top score	43	16
Balls bowled	60	180
Wickets	0	4
Bowling average	–	32.75
5 wickets in innings	–	0
10 wickets in match	–	0
Best bowling	–	3/26
Catches/stumpings	1/–	1/–
- Source: CricInfo, 16 October 2017

Waduge Suranga Thushara Fernando (born 18 September 1982) is a former Sri Lankan cricketer who has played in eight first class matches and in nine List A matches.
