= Nancy Wijekoon =

Sri Lankan poet and activist

Nancy M. Wijekoon (Sinhala: නැන්සි විජේකෝන්) was a Sri Lankan poet and activist during the Sri Lankan independence movement.

Wijekoon, a schoolteacher, was an active Sinhala nationalist in this period. She was a member of the Young Lanka League, Sri Lanka's earliest radical nationalist organization, which was the first of the Youth Leagues fighting for Sri Lankan independence from the British Empire.

She was also an English-language poet who became well known for her work centered on patriotic themes. Wijekoon is best known for her poem "Our Motherland," which was published in 1918 in the first issue of Young Lanka. The poem uses the tropes of British Romanticism and Christian hymns to celebrate the landscape of Sri Lanka, while describing the island as "loved but fallen."

Her poetry was seen as seditious by the British, and during the 1915 Sinhalese-Muslim riots, the police inspector general ordered that she be surveilled.
