= Thushara (1973 film) =

1973 Sri Lankan romantic drama film

Thushara තුෂාරා
- Directed by: Yasapalitha Nanayakkara
- Written by: Yasapalitha Nanayakkara
- Produced by: Mohamed Omar Kareem Hassan
- Starring: Vijaya Kumaratunga; Malini Fonseka; Joe Abeywickrama; Sonia Disa
- Cinematography: William Ohlums
- Edited by: T. Bawanandan
- Music by: P. L. A. Somapala
- Release date: 9 March 1973
- Country: Sri Lanka
- Language: Sinhala

Thushara (Sinhala: තුෂාරා) is a 1973 Sri Lankan Sinhala romantic film directed by Yasapalitha Nanayakkara and produced by Mohamed Omar Kareem Hassan. It stars Vijaya Kumaratunga and Malini Fonseka in lead roles along with Joe Abeywickrama and Sonia Disa. The music was composed by P. L. A. Somapala.

The film became a blockbuster of that year and commercially successful. It also received critical acclaim, specially for the songs "Kalak Thisse" and "Oho Thushara". It is the 261st film in Sinhala cinema. The film was remade and screened in 2009 with the same title, where Saliya Sathyajith and Shalika Edirisinghe played the lead roles of 'Sampath' and 'Thushara' respectively.

== Plot ==
Sampath, Thushara and Keerthi are batchmates. Sonia is a relation of Sampath. Thushara is Sampath's girl friend at campus. Sonia and Thushara are friends. Sonia's father and Sampath's mother tries to make them marry but Sampath doesn't have any romantic feelings for Sonia. So Sonia and specially her father does things to put apart Thushara and Sampath. One is to tell fake things to Thushara's father about Sampath and make him disappointed. Another one is attacking Sampath at a club. The story goes on as Sampath persists those challenges and finally marries Thushara and at the end of the film we get the feeling that Sonia and Keerthi find love between them too.

== Cast ==
- Vijaya Kumaratunga as Sampath
- Malini Fonseka as Thushara
- Joe Abeywickrama as Keerthi
- Sonia Disa as Sonia
- Baptist Fernando as Wijesinghe
- Shanthi Lekha as Sampath's mother
- Douglas Wickremasinghe as Thushara's father
- Mark Samaranayake as Sonia's father
- B. S. Perera as Wilson
- Alexander Fernando as Alex
- Lilian Edirisinghe as Villager
- Piyadasa Wijekoon as Wijesinghe's henchman

== Soundtrack ==
No.	Title	Singer(s)	Length
1.	"Oho Thushara"	H. R.Jothipala
2.	"Meedum Gala Kande"	H. R.Jothipala, Angeline Gunathilake
3.	"Jeewanaye Meewanaye"	H. R. Jothipala, Angeline Gunathilake
4.	"Kalak Thisse Sithak Pathle"	H. R.Jothipala, Angeline Gunathilake
5.	"Maa Hada Obei Dayawi"	H. R.Jothipala
6.	"Rantharu Se Punsada Se"	Sujatha Aththanayaka
7.	"Kawudo Me Awe"	Angeline Gunathilake, Sujatha Aththanayake and H.R.Jothipala
8.	"Kalak Thisse"	H.R.Jothipala
