= Thushara Pillai =

Indian astrophysicist and astronomer

- Born: 20 June 1980 (age 46); Kerala, India
- Education: Government Women's College, Thiruvananthapuram; IIT Madras; Max Planck Institute for Radio Astronomy
- Occupations: Astrophysicist and astronomer
- Spouse: Jens Kauffmann

Thushara Pillai is an Indian astrophysicist and astronomer with a senior research scientist position at Boston University's Institute for Astrophysical Research and MIT Haystack Observatory. Her research interests have included molecular clouds, high-mass star formation, magnetic fields, astrochemistry, and the Galactic Center. She is known for her work that looked to understand star formation by observing magnetized interstellar clouds, and Pillai is the first astronomer to capture images of magnetic fields reorienting near areas of star formation.

== Early life and education ==
Pillai was born 20 June 1980 in Kerala, India to parents P. Gopalakrishna Pillai and K. S. Shyamala Kumar. She attended KV Pattom where she was a 1997 Class XII Batch alumna, and Pillai's mother was a teacher at this government day school. Pillai's parents and teachers from an early age encouraged her to pursue physics and higher education.

Pillai attended Government Women's College in Thiruvananthapuram to receive her BSc in physics. Then, she pursued her Masters in Physics at IIT Madras, where one summer, she was given the opportunity to participate in an astronomy project at the National Center for Radio Astronomy in Pune, pushing her interest toward astronomy and astrophysics. She completed her highest education, a PhD in astronomy, at the Max Planck Institute for Radio Astronomy in Germany.

== Career ==
Pillai holds the position of Senior Research Scientist at Boston University's Institute for Astrophysical Research. She also held a guest researcher position at her alma mater, the Max Planck Institute for Radio Astronomy, where she worked in the Department of Millimeter and Submillimeter Astronomy. There, her research focused on early phase chemistry, infrared dark clouds, high mass star formation, and star formation and cloud evolution in the galactic center.

== Research ==
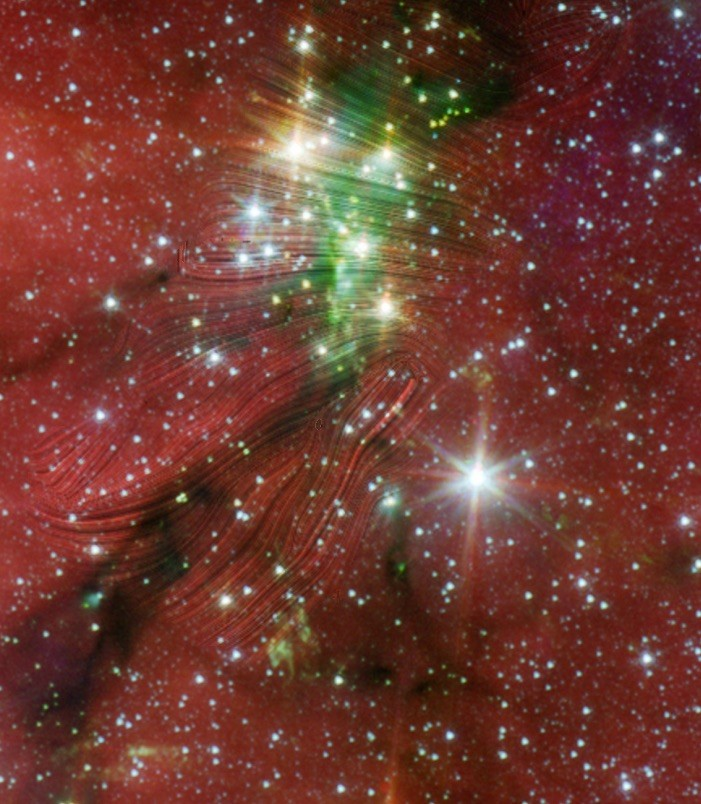
Artistic rendition of the magnetic field structures observed in Pillai's research

Pillai is most known for her paper published in Nature Astronomy, "Magnetized filamentary gas flows feeding the young embedded cluster in Serpens South." This paper shed light on the extent to which molecular clouds in space play a role in star formation. A grant from the National Science Foundation's Division of Astronomical Sciences to Boston University helped support this research, which used data from NASA's Stratospheric Observatory for Infrared Astronomy (SOFIA). Using this technology, Pillai and her team were able to construct images of magnetic fields' directions and structures near the site of star formation. These images are useful to current and future understandings of interstellar space star formation.

Much of Pillai's research has been done with support from NASA, the German Space Center, the Universities Space Research Association, the National Science Foundation, the Bonn-Cologne Graduate School, the Brazilian National Council for Scientific and Technological Development, and Fundação de Amparo à Pesquisa do Estado de Minas Gerais. She often works with her husband, Jens Kauffmann, who is an astronomer affiliated with the California Institute of Technology.

=== Selected publications ===
- Pillai, T.; Wyrowski, F.; Carey, S. J.; Menten, K. M. (May 2006). "Ammonia in infrared dark clouds". Astronomy & Astrophysics. 450 (2): 569–583. arXiv:astro-ph/0601078. Bibcode:2006A&A...450..569P. doi:10.1051/0004-6361:20054128. S2CID 14760432.
- Kauffmann, Jens; Pillai, Thushara (7 October 2010). "How Many Infrared Dark Clouds Can form Massive Stars and Clusters?". The Astrophysical Journal. 723 (1): L7–L12. arXiv:1009.1617. Bibcode:2010ApJ...723L...7K. doi:10.1088/2041-8205/723/1/l7. S2CID 13386380.
- Kauffmann, Jens; Pillai, Thushara; Goldsmith, Paul F. (4 December 2013). "Low Virial Parameters in Molecular Clouds: Implications for High Mass Star Formation and Magnetic Fields". The Astrophysical Journal. 779 (2): 185. arXiv:1308.5679. Bibcode:2013ApJ...779..185K. doi:10.1088/0004-637x/779/2/185. S2CID 19953338.
- Zhang, Qizhou; Wang, Yang; Pillai, Thushara; Rathborne, Jill (15 April 2009). "Fragmentation at the Earliest Phase of Massive Star Formation". The Astrophysical Journal. 696 (1): 268–273. arXiv:0902.0647. Bibcode:2009ApJ...696..268Z. doi:10.1088/0004-637x/696/1/268. S2CID 17257286.
- Pillai, T.; Kauffmann, J.; Tan, J. C.; Goldsmith, P. F.; Carey, S. J.; Menten, K. M. (16 January 2015). "Magnetic Fields in High-mass Infrared Dark Clouds". The Astrophysical Journal. 799 (1): 74. arXiv:1410.7390. Bibcode:2015ApJ...799...74P. doi:10.1088/0004-637x/799/1/74. S2CID 7676150.
