= Piyadasa Wijekoon =

Sri Lankan stuntman and actor

Piyadasa Wijekoon පියදාස විජේකෝන්
- Born: Wijekoon Mudiyanselage Piyadasa; October 22, 1940; Sri Lanka
- Died: February 9, 2003 (aged 62)
- Education: Vidyawardana Maha Vidyalaya, Narahenpita
- Occupation(s): Actor, Dramatist, Stunt man
- Years active: 1957–2000
- Children: Priyantha Wijekoon

Wijekoon Mudiyanselage Piyadasa (22 October 1940 – 9 February 2003 as පියදාස විජේකෝන්) was a Sri Lankan stunt and character actor. His career spanned over 42 years with 140 films and he played a wide variety of roles in that time.

== Personal life ==
Wijekoon attended Narahenpita Vidyawardena School. His son Priyantha Wijekoon is also an actor.

== Acting career ==
He made his film debut uncredited in a song sequence of the film Sirakaruwa in 1957. He got his first major role in A. S. Nagarajan's Purusha Ratnaya (1959) playing the brother of the heroine. It was Nagarajan who suggested he stylize his name as 'Piyadasa Wijekoon'.

After Nagarajan, Robin Tampoe took Wijekoon under his wing and began giving him roles in his films. Under Tampoe's guidance Wijekoon shaved his hair and played a villain for the first time in Suhada Divi Piduma (1961). This role proved popular and Wijekoon was flooded with villain roles from then on. Some of his popular stage dramas include Siwamma Dhanapala, Apuru Yahaluwo and Manape.

Through the 1960s and 1970s, Wijekoon's performances in films revolved around playing henchman and thug type characters who got into and lost fights with the hero. A notable exception was Siripala Saha Ranmenike where he played a positive character though still at odds with the anti-hero Ravindra Randeniya.

In the 1980s and 1990s as he grew fatty and older Wijekoon began to take comedic roles and stopped doing fighting roles.

== Filmography ==
| Year | Film | Role | Ref. |
|---|---|---|---|
| 1957 | Sirakaruwa | Dancer | |
| 1959 | Purusha Rathnaya | Samarasinghe | |
| 1959 | Ma Ale Kala Tharuniya | | |
| 1961 | Suvineetha Lalani | | |
| 1962 | Suhada Divi Piduma | Jimmy | |
| 1962 | Sudu Sande Kalu Wala | Bald Thug | |
| 1964 | Samaje Api Okkoma Samanai | Samson 'Punchi Hamu' | |
| 1964 | Sulalitha Sobani | Jayasekara | |
| 1965 | Sudo Sudu | Army joiner | |
| 1965 | Landaka Mahima | | |
| 1966 | Segawena Sewanella | | |
| 1966 | Kolamba Hadayo | Suraweera | |
| 1966 | Mahadenamuththa | Egg offerer | |
| 1966 | Kinkini Paada | | |
| 1966 | Sampatha | | |
| 1966 | Senasili Suwaya | Mistaken good samaritan | |
| 1966 | Akka Nayo | | |
| 1968 | Wahal Dupatha | | |
| 1968 | Baduth Ekka Horu | Nambiyar's boss | |
| 1969 | Mee Masso | | |
| 1969 | Pickpocket | Dharme's foe | |
| 1969 | Pancha | | |
| 1970 | Ohoma Hondada | | |
| 1971 | Pujithayo | Vijay | |
| 1971 | Davena Pipasa | | |
| 1971 | Kathuru Muwath | Murdered cashier | |
| 1971 | Abhirahasa | Opening antagonistic bargoer | |
| 1971 | Kesara Sinhayo | Vijay | |
| 1971 | Seeye Nottuwa | | |
| 1972 | Edath Suraya Adath Suraya | Security Guard | |
| 1972 | Ada Mehemai | Home money offerer | |
| 1972 | Hathara Wate | | |
| 1972 | Ihatha Athmaya | Piya | |
| 1972 | Miringuwa | | |
| 1973 | Aparadhaya Ha Danduwama | | |
| 1973 | Thushara | Vijay henchman | |
| 1973 | Hondama Welawa | | |
| 1973 | Sunethra | | |
| 1973 | Hondai Narakai | | |
| 1973 | Dahakin Ekek | Sam | |
| 1974 | Duleeka | | |
| 1974 | Dinum Kanuwa | | |
| 1974 | Surekha | | |
| 1974 | Duppathage Hithawatha | Somey | |
| 1974 | Lasanda | Henchman | |
| 1974 | Onna Babo Billo Enavo | Bubamba | |
| 1974 | Rodi Gama | Game Adiriya | |
| 1975 | Gijulihiniiyo | Mahathun | |
| 1975 | Hitha Honda Minihek | Dougie | |
| 1975 | Obai Mamai | Dougie | |
| 1975 | Awa Soya Adare | Hamu | |
| 1975 | Sukiri Kella | Piyadasa Mudalali | |
| 1975 | Cyril Malli | | |
| 1975 | Ranwan Rekha | | |
| 1975 | Damayanthi | | |
| 1975 | Sadhana | | |
| 1975 | Hadawatha Wasanthaya | | |
| 1975 | Sangeetha | | |
| 1976 | Pradeepe Ma Wewa | | |
| 1976 | Nayana | | |
| 1976 | Kawuda Raja | Finale Sena fighter | |
| 1976 | Loka Horu | | |
| 1976 | Haratha Hathara | | |
| 1976 | Asha | | |
| 1976 | Deviyange Theenduwa | Swami | |
| 1977 | Aege Adara Kathawa | Vijay | |
| 1977 | Chin Chin Nona | | |
| 1977 | Honda Hitha | | |
| 1977 | Siripala Saha Ranmenika | Inspector Wijekoon | |
| 1977 | Maruwa Samaga Wase | Eidiris 'Mudalali' | |
| 1977 | Tom Pachaya | Rupasena 'Edward Rajakaruna' | |
| 1977 | Niwena Ginna | | |
| 1978 | Sithaka Suwanda | Lilly's Suitor | |
| 1978 | Vishmaya | Andiriya | |
| 1978 | Kundalakeshi | Sathruka's man | |
| 1978 | Tikira | Somey | |
| 1978 | Anupama | Robbery victim | |
| 1979 | Raja Kollo | Dharme's man | |
| 1979 | Muwan Palessa | Gobira | |
| 1979 | Monarathenna | Hurathala 'Mama' | |
| 1979 | Akke Mata Awasara | Piyadasa | |
| 1979 | Rosa Mal Thunak | Mahadana Mutha | |
| 1979 | Sawudan Jema | | |
| 1979 | Subhani | | |
| 1979 | Nuwan Renu | Tamil gardener | |
| 1980 | Anuhasa | | |
| 1980 | Sinhabahu | | |
| 1980 | Api Dedena | | |
| 1981 | Valampuri | | |
| 1981 | Eka Dawasak Ra | Roland | |
| 1981 | Amme Mata Samawenna | Loku Hamu | |
| 1982 | Sudu Ayya | Sarath's father | |
| 1982 | Eka Diga Kathawak | | |
| 1982 | Jeewithayen Jeewithayak | | |
| 1982 | Sithara | | |
| 1982 | Thakkita Tharikita | | |
| 1982 | Newatha Hamuwemu | Gang leader | |
| 1983 | Sasara Wasana Thura | | |
| 1983 | Sumithuro | Simon | |
| 1983 | Chandi Siriya | | |
| 1983 | Hithath Hondai Wadath Hondai | | |
| 1984 | Veera Madduma Bandara | | |
| 1984 | Kokila | Piyadasa | |
| 1984 | Muthu Menike | | |
| 1984 | Kekille Rajjuruwo | | |
| 1984 | Namal Renu | | |
| 1984 | Ara Soyza | Vadigapatuna | |
| 1988 | The Further Adventures of Tennessee Buck | Panang Chief | |
| 1988 | Ko Hathuro | | |
| 1988 | Newatha Api Ekwemu | | |
| 1989 | Mamai Raja | Ranjith's Advisor | |
| 1989 | Sinasenna Raththaran | | |
| 1990 | Sambudu Mahima | | |
| 1990 | Walawwe Hamu | | |
| 1990 | Chandi Raja | | |
| 1990 | Honda Honda Sellam | Inspector Koon | |
| 1991 | Uthura Dakuna | | |
| 1991 | Raja Kello | | |
| 1991 | Raja Sellan | | |
| 1991 | Lave In Bangkok | | |
| 1991 | Alibaba Saha Horu Hathaliha | | |
| 1991 | Suwadena Suwayak | | |
| 1992 | Sakvithi Raja | | |
| 1992 | Chandi Rejina | | |
| 1992 | Sinha Raja | | |
| 1992 | Sathya | | |
| 1993 | Chaya Maya | | |
| 1993 | Lagin Giyoth Aehek Na | | |
| 1993 | Juriya Mamai | Victor | |
| 1994 | Nohadan Landune | | |
| 1994 | Sujatha | Driver | |
| 1995 | Wasana Wewa | | |
| 1995 | Vijay Saha Ajay | Pushpa's father | |
| 1995 | Chandiyage Putha | Pancha | |
| 1996 | Naralowa Holman | Loku Mamma | |
| 1996 | Mana Mohini | Libuto | |
| 1996 | Seema Pawuru | | |
| 1997 | Punaruthpaththia | | |
| 1997 | Apaye Thappara 84000k | | |
| 1999 | Kolompoor | Lorry Munna | |
