= Sirisena Wimalaweera =

Sri Lankan film director (1900–1963)

Sirisena Wimalaweera සිරිසේන විමලවීර
- Born: 23 July 1901; Tangalle, Sri Lanka
- Died: 24 August 1963 (aged 62)
- Education: Christchurch Sinhala College, Tangalle
- Occupations: Director, lyricist, screenwriter, producer
- Years active: 1949–1963
- Children: 5

Sirisena Wimalaweera (Sinhala: සිරිසේන විමලවීර; born 23 June 1901 – died 24 August 1963) was a Sri Lankan filmmaker and theater master. He made several critically acclaimed films from 1949 to 1960. He is the first independent Sinhalese and Sri Lankan to direct a Sinhala film and first Sinhala Independent Producer.

== Personal life ==
Wimalaweera was born on 23 June 1901 in Tangalle. He was a man of good knowledge about different languages such as Bengali, Gujarati, Hindi, Urdu, etc. At the age of eleven, he traveled to India with his uncle to study Ayurvedic medicine, but he got the idea of doing drama. He has two daughters, Somawathi and Premawathi; and three sons, Daya, Upasena and Ranjith. His elder son Daya Wimalaweera was a popular film director, cameraman, script writer and also a producer. Upesena Wimalaweera is also a sound engineer and editor.

Wimalaweera was rushed to the Khalil Private Hospital in Maradana and was 62 years old when he died on 24 August 1963.

== Career ==
Wimalaweera came back to Sri Lanka and did many dramas and Wimalaweera went to the Neptune studio in South India on 19 November 1948 and spent eight months producing his first film Amma in 1949. His second feature Seedevi was produced the following year. He directed many stage plays such as Gan Wathura, Seedevi, Amma, Rodi Kella and Heladiva Purangana.

He continued his film career by directing many films such as Pitisera Kella and Saradeyal in 1954, Podi Putha in 1955, Asoka in 1957, Ekamath Eka Rataka in 1958, Ma Alaya Kala Tharuniya in 1959, and many more.

He also received an award for best film Podi Putha (1956), which was critically acclaimed as his best film. He introduced many actors and singers too. Podi Putha won the award for the Best Film at the 1956 Deepashika Film Festival. He directed the first film in Sri Lanka with cartoons, Ekamath Eka Rataka in 1958. His 1955 film Asoka was the only Sinhala film to be screened in China, according to "Motion Picture" magazine. His film Ma Ale Kala Tharuniya was adjudged the best movie of the year at the 1959 cinema's edited by Jayawilal Wilegoda. In 1960, Wimalaweera started the film Punchi Amma and introduced Tony Ranasinghe to the silver screen. In the meantime, Wimalaweera has started the film Rodi Kella and has selected Sandya Kumari for the first time to play the lead role. This film also marked Premasiri Khemadasa's first musical directorial debut.

Wimalaweera's films attempted to stay true to Sinhala history and culture and are considered a step forward in Sinhala cinema. Due to his indefatigable efforts a film studio named "Nawajeewana" was built in Kirobathgoda, Kelaniya which was established on 13 September 1951, which is known as the only studio owned by a Sri Lankan filmmaker. His style and techniques were similar to Jayamanne's work however and Wimalaweera didn't receive critical approval.

== Filmography ==
=== As director ===
Year	Film	Other roles	Ref.
1949	Amma	Screenwriter, Lyricist	
1951	See Devi	Screenwriter, Lyricist	
1953	Pitisara Kella	Screenwriter, Lyricist	
1954	Saradiel	Screenwriter, Lyricist, Producer	
1955	Asoka		
1955	Podi Putha	Screenwriter, Lyricist, Sudappu Samaranayake (acting)	
1957	Sirakaruwa	Screenwriter, Lyricist	
1958	Ekamath Eka Rataka	Screenwriter, Lyricist	
1959	Ma Ale Kala Tharuniya	Screenwriter, Lyricist	
1960	Wana Mala	Screenwriter, Lyricist	

=== As lyricist ===
Year	Film	Ref.
1953	Sujatha	
1954	Warada Kageda	
1994	Sujatha	
2004	Seethala Gini Kandu	
