= Lilian Edirisinghe =

Sri Lankan actress and comedian

Lilian Edirisinghe ලිලියන් එදිරිසිංහ
- Born: Lilian Edirisinghe; 19 May 1922; Imbulgoda, Sri Lanka
- Died: 26 December 1993 (aged 71); Kelaniya
- Education: Perakumbadeniya Maha Vidyalaya
- Occupations: Actress, Dramatist
- Years active: 1940–1991
- Parents: Lewis Edirisinghe (father); Kalu Kankanamge Podi Nona (mother)

Lilian Edirisinghe (born 19 May 1922 – died 26 December 1993 as ලිලියන් එදිරිසිංහ) [Sinhala]), was an actress in Sri Lankan cinema, stage drama and television. One of the earliest pillars in Sri Lankan film history, Edirisinghe had a career that spanned more than four decades primarily in villain and comedy roles.

== Personal life ==
Edirisinghe was born on 19 May 1922 in Imbulgoda area as the seventh of a family with 11 siblings. Her father Lewis Edirisinghe was a farmer and mother Kalu Kankanamge Podi Nona was a housewife. She attended to Parakandeniya Vidyalaya, Kossinna currently known as Perakumbadeniya Maha Vidyalaya. She started to act in school dramas and is a die hard fan of Laxmi Bhai. She married in 1942 and the couple gave birth to a son - Ranjith, who died after two months of age. Her husband also died soon after.

== Acting career ==
Edirisinghe moved to Colombo with her family, where she started to practice dancing under renowned dance master Mohammad Gauss Master. In 1940, Under Gauss Master, she also studied drama and was able to act in the stage drama Bihisunu Lanka. Then she acted in the drama Raaja Poronduwa where she continued to act more than 300 times.

== Filmography ==
Edirisinghe started her film career with B.A.W. Jayamanne's 1954 film Iranganie. In the film she acted as a teacher. Then she continued to act in more than 150 films across many genre. Some of her popular acting came through films such as Ara Soyza, Sihina Sathak, Kolamkarayo and Chandi Shyama.

- No. denotes the Number of Sri Lankan film in the Sri Lankan cinema.

Year	No.	Film	Role	Ref.
1954		Iranganie	Iskola Hamine	
1955		Suragani		
1955		Seda Sulan		
1956		Surathali		
1958		Ekamath Eka Rataka		
1958		Deyyange Rate	Babamma	
1958		Suneetha		
1959		Sihinaya	Chandra's mother	
1960		Subhadra		
1960		Sundara Birinda		
1961		Kurulu Bedda		
1961		Gan Thera		
1961		Suwineetha Laalani		
1962		Suhada Diwi Piduma		
1963		Sunilaa		
1963		Suhada Sohoyuro		
1963		Mangalika		
1963		Sudu Sande Kalu Walaa	Manike's mother	
1963		Deepashika	Sumana	
1964		Kala Kala De Pala Pala De		
1964		Sulalitha Sobani	Podi Hami	
1964		Sasaraka Hati	Luncy Nona	
1964		Sithaka Mahima		
1964		Sobana Sitha		
1965		Sathutai Kandulai		
1965		Allapu Gedara	Baby	
1965		Satha Panaha	Mahathaya's date	
1965		Sekaya	Maduri's mother	
1965		Landaka Mahima		
1966		Sangawena Sewanalla		
1966		Senasuma Kothanada		
1966		Mahadenamuththa	Water Giver's mother	
1966		Athulweema Thahanam		
1966		Sihina Hathak	Baby Nona	
1966		Kinkini Paada		
1966		Kapatikama	Engelsina, Sarpin's wife	
1966		Sampatha		
1966		Sudu Duwa		
1966		Sanda Naga Eddi		
1966		Layata Laya		
1966		Seyawak Pasupasa		
1967		Daru Duka	Omeri Hami	
1967		Segawunu Menika		
1967		Pipena Kumudu		
1967		Sarana		
1967		Ipadune Ai		
1968		Landon Hamu		
1968		Adudass Kale		
1968		Akka Nago		
1968		Bicycle Hora		
1968		Amathikama		
1968		Hangi Hora		
1968		Ruhunu Kumari		
1968		Dehadaka Duka	Heen Hamu's accomplice	
1968		Ataweni Pudumaya		
1969		Kawuda Hari	Ransina	
1969		Prawesamwanna	Mrs. Basnayake	
1969		Oba Nathinam		
1969		Kohomada Wade		
1969		Hathara Peraliya		
1969		Sumudu Bharya		
1970		Penawa Neda		
1970		Suli Sulan		
1972		Singapuru Charlie		
1972		Lokuma Hinawa	Engelsina	
1972		Ada Mehemai	Elder sister	
1973		Thushara	Villager	
1973		Sinawai Inawai		
1974		Surekha		
1974		Hadawath Naththo		
1974		Onna Babo Billo Enawa		
1974		Susee		
1974		Lasandaa	Kadiramma	
1974		Sahayata Danny	Landlady	
1974		Rodee Gama	Podina	
1975		Kaliyuga Kaale		
1975		Aawa Soya Adare	Sumana's mother	
1975		Mage Nangi Shyama		
1975		Kokilayo		
1975		Sadhana		
1976		Waasana	Nona	
1976		Loka Horu		
1976		Haaratha Hathara		
1976		Aasha		
1976		Dewiyange Theenduwa	Hamine	
1976		Ran Thilaka		
1977		Sudu Paraviyo	Ango	
1977		Hariyanakota Ohoma Thamai		
1977		Honda Hitha		
1977		Vanagatha Kella		
1978		Mage Ran Putha		
1978		Kundala Keshi	Saroja	
1978		Chandi Shyama		
1978		Sally		
1978		Deepanjalee		
1979		Jeewana Kandulu		
1979		Hingana Kolla	Mary	
1979		Raja Kollo	Ra Nanda	
1979		Muwan Palessa	Gobira's wife	
1979		Ran Kurullo	Soyza's mother	
1979		Anusha	Fake Mommy	
1979		Sawudan Jema		
1979		Hari Pudumai		
1980		Seetha		
1981		Kolankarayo	Member Mahaththaya's wife	
1981		Senasuma		
1981		Geethika		
1981		Jeewanthi		
1982		Sandaa	Seneviratne's mother	
1982		Chathu Madura	Sunil's mother	
1982		Kadawunu Poronduwa	Debtor	
1983		Chandi Siriya		
1983		Menik Maliga		
1983		Loku Thaththa		
1984		Ara Soyza	Loku Hamine	
1984		Kekille Rajjuruwo	Mahadana Mutha's wife	
1985		Chalitha Rangali		
1985		Adarayaka Mahima	Lilly	
1985		Rosy		
1985		Doo Daruwo		
1986		Mal Warusa	Englathina	
1988		Chandingeth Chandiya		
1988		Newa Gilunath Ban Chun	Lillian	
1989		Mamai Raja	Vegetable vendor	
1989		Badulu Kochchiya		
1990		Sambudu Mahima		
1990		Pem Rajadahana		
1990		Jaya Kothanada		
1990		Chandi Raja		
1991		Paaradise		
1991		Asai Bayai		
1991		Raja Kello		
1991		Raja Sellan		
1991		Cheriyo Doctor	Head nurse	
1991		Alibaba Saha Horu Hathaliha		
1991		Suwandena Suwandak		
1992		Salli Thubunata Madi		
1992		Sakkara Suththara		
1992		Sinha Raja		
1992		Okkoma Kanapita		
1992		Rajek Wage Puthek		
1993		Soorayan Athara Veeraya	Babbi aunty	
1993		Juriya Mamai	Lillian	
1994		Sujaatha	Madam	
1994		Okkoma Hondatai		
1994		Vijaya Geetha	Maggie	
1995		Wasana Wewa		
1995		Pudumai Eth Aththai		
1995		Deviyani Sathya Surakinna	Batti	
1995		Chandiyage Putha	Chutti's mother	
1995		Cheriyo Captain	Mrs. Rambo	
1996		Naralowa Holman	Massage parlor owner	
1996		Hitha Honda Geheniyak		
2008		Ai Oba Thaniwela		

== Awards and Accolades ==
- Won Deepashika Award in 1968 for playing the most number of films of the year.

=== Sarasaviya Film Festival ===
Year	Nominee / work	Award	Result
1967	Daru Duka	Merit Award	Won
