= Sri Lankan Tamil cinema =

Tamil filmmaking industry in Sri Lanka

Sri Lankan Tamil cinema is a small filmmaking industry based in Sri Lanka, which has made under 100 Tamil language films as of 2013. it is separate from its Indian counterpart, the Tamil cinema of Kodambakkam in Chennai, Tamil Nadu, as many Sri Lankan Tamil actors work in Sri Lankan films or independent Tamil films overseas, although a few noted Tamil actors in India were born in Sri Lanka. Sri Lankan Tamil cinema's growth has largely been stalled due to the Sri Lankan Civil War.

== History ==
Tamils contributed significantly to Sinhala cinema as well as Indian Tamil cinema. The earliest ever Tamil films were mostly destroyed or unrecovered during wartime. The first known Sinhalese film dubbed in Tamil was released on 29 December 1951. The Sri Lankan Tamil film Samuthayam (transl. Society), an adaptation of C.N. Annadurai’s Velaikkari, was made in 16 mm and technicolor. It was shown in 1962 and 1963. Thottakkari (Plantation Woman), released on 28 March 1962, was the first Sri Lankan Tamil film in the standard 35 mm format. It included speeches by trade unionists S. Thondaman and Azeez and was directed by Krishnakumar, who also played the film's male lead.

Government-instituted development and individual achievement (1971–1979); unprecedented surge in yearly admissions In 1971, a socialist government that sought to overcome the dominance of screen time in Sri Lanka by Tamil and Hindi films came to power in the country. Foreign film dominance had resulted in domestically produced films being relegated to 20% of the screen time while foreign films occupied 80% (60% Tamil, 10% Hindi, 10% English). The government that won power had promised to redress this imbalance. It established the State Film Corporation by Act No. 47 of 1971, charged with the promotion of national film and giving and making available a wide variety of films to the public.

The State Film Corporation (SFC) established a unique credit scheme for film production. Loans were given on the basis of a script evaluation, and those taking part with credit were given on the collateral of the negatives. This was at a time when bank lending was very conventional and such a 'collateral' was unheard of in the banking industry. The directors and main technicians had to have prior training to obtain loans via a system of registration. Prior to these measures, films produced domestically were transliterations of Tamil and Hindi films, to the extent that there was no credit for screenplay. The only credit was for dialogues, as the "screenplay" was a transliteration of the Hindi or Tamil original. The credit scheme ensured original screenwriting for the first time, and stories that were copies of Hindi and Tamil were not entitled to receive loans. Thus, a professional film production industry was established.

As a rebirth of Sri Lankan Tamil cinema, the comedy/thriller movie Komaali Kings was announced on 23 January 2016. The team says, "‘Komaali Kings’ is an attempt to rekindle and re-establish nostalgic memories of the hay days of Sri Lankan Tamil cinema."

The filmography of the Sri Lankan Tamil cinema is as follows.

== Early films 1960s ==
| No | Film title | Meaning of title | Film director | Date released | Notes |
|---|---|---|---|---|---|
| 1 | Samuthayam | Society | Henry Chandrawansa | 1962 | 16-mm Technicolor Movie |
| 2 | Thottakkari | A lady from Plantation | Krishnakumar | 28 March 1962 | |
| 3 | Kadamayin Ellai | Limits of Duty | M.Vedanayagam | 1966 | |
| 4 | Pasa Nila | Beloved Moon | Joe Dev Anand | 1966 | 16-mm Movie |
| 5 | Taxi Driver | Taxi Driver | T.Sundukuli Somasegaran | 1966 | |
| 6 | Nirmala | Nirmala | A.Ragunathan | 1968 | |

== Films released in 1970s ==
| No | Film title | Meaning of title | Film director | Date released | Notes |
|---|---|---|---|---|---|
| 7 | Manjal Kungumam | Turmeric and Kumkum | Balan | 1970 | |
| 8 | Vensangu | White Conch | W. M. S.Thambo | 1970 | |
| 9 | Kuthuvilakku | Sacred Lamp | W. S. Mahendran | 1972 | |
| 10 | Meenava Penn | Fisherfolk Lady | Krishnakumar | 1973 | |
| 11 | Pudhiya Kattru | A New waves | S. Ramanathan | 1975 | |
| 12 | Komaligal | The Clowns | S. Ramanathan | 1976 | |
| 13 | Ponmani | Ponmani | Dharmasena Patthiraja | 1977 | |
| 14 | Kaathirupaen Unakaaha | I will wait for you | S. V. Chandran | 1977 | |
| 15 | Naan Ungal Thozhan | I'm Your friend | S. V. Chandran | 1978 | |
| 16 | Vadakkattru | Cool Breeze | Premnath Moraes | 1977 | |
| 17 | Thendralum Puyalum | Wind and Typhoon | M. A. Kapoor | 1978 | First and only Tamil Cinemasope movie |
| 18 | Theivam Thantha Veedu | God gave this House | Wlfred Silva | 1978 | |
| 19 | Aemalikal | Fools | S. Ramanathan | 1978 | |
| 20 | Anuragam | Anuragam | Yasapalitha Nanayakkara | 1978 | |
| 21 | Engalil Oruvan | A Man among us | S.V.Chandran | 1979 | |

== Films released in 1980s ==
| No | Film title | Meaning of title | Film director | Date released |
|---|---|---|---|---|
| 22 | Rathathin Rathamae | Beloved blood relatives | Joe Dev Anand | 1980 |
| 23 | Aval Oru Jeevanathi | She is a living river | J.B.Robert, Joe Michael | 1980 |
| 24 | Nadu Potra Vaalka | Live a great life so that the country will celebrate you | Yasapalitha Nanayakkara | 1979 |
| 25 | Nenjukku Neethi | Just to the heart | T.Sundukuli Somasegaran | 1980 |
| 26 | Pathai Maariya Paruvangal | Ages when paths changed | NA | 1982 |

== Films released in 2000s—present ==
| No | Film title | Meaning of title | Film director | Date released | Notes |
|---|---|---|---|---|---|
| 27 | Sharmilavin Ithaya Ragam | Sharmila’s Melody of the Heart | Peradeniya Junaideen, Sunil Soma Peiris | 1993 | |
| 28 | Kadalora Kaatru | A Wing Along the Coast | N. Kesavarajan | 31 December 2002 | |
| 29 | Orey Naalil | In a single day | Yusuf Rahim | released 2011 | |
| 30 | Operation Ellalan | Symbol of Supreme Sacrifice | Thamilan | 2010 | |
| 31 | Ennul Enna Matramo | What change do I have within me? | S.Kavimaran | 14 June 2013 | |
| 32 | School Gang - Kalluri Padaiyani | Musical Instrument | K.Kiruthigan | 16 June 2015 | |
| 33 | Senthanal | Red Flame | Sutharshan Kanagarajah | April 2016 | |
| 34 | Komaali Kings | Kings Of Comedians | King Ratnam | 23 February 2018 | |
| 35 | Oru Kuyilum 2 Koattankalum | 1 Koel, 2 batons | NS Thanaa | 26 June 2018 | |
| 36 | Bodhai | Addictive | Kirushanth Jeyakumar | 26 June 2019 | |
| 37 | Parthiba | Parthiba | R. P. Abarnasuthan | 21 November 2019 | |
| 38 | Sinamkol | Infuriate | Ranjith Joseph | 4 January 2020 | |
| 39 | Theevinai Achcham | Scared | Dinesh Raveendran | 8 Feb 2020 | |
| 40 | Puththi Ketta Manitharellam | All dumb people | Raj Sivaraj | 24 December 2021 | |
| 41 | Munnel | Soil | Visakesa Chandrasekaram | 28 January 2023 | |
| 42 | Vellinattukkaasu | Foreign money | Sasikaran Yo | 26 March 2023 | |
| 43 | Soppana Sundhari | | Mathavan Maheswaran | 26 August 2023 | |
| 44 | Adhiran | | Thinesh Kanagaraj | 28 November 2025 | |
| 45 | OTP Oru Trip Powam | | Joy Jegarthan | 15 April 2026 | |

== Films yet to be released ==
| No | Film title | Meaning of title | Film director | Notes |
|---|---|---|---|---|
| 1 | Meendum | Again | Dhurupan | made in Norway |
| 2 | Kaadhal Kaditham | Love Letter | Mukesh | |
| 3 | Poiyaa Vilakku | The Lamp of Truth | Thanesh Gopal | |
| 4 | Venthu Thaninthathu Kaadu | The Scorched Forest | Mathi Sutha | |

== International films ==
| No | Film title | Meaning of title | Film director | Date released | Notes |
|---|---|---|---|---|---|
| 1 | Mann | Earth | Pudhiyavan | 24 November 2006 | made by British expatriates and Indians |
| 2 | Akoran | Very angry person | Dinesh Raveendran | 10 February 2017 | released in Australia |
| 3 | Little Jaffna | | Lawrence Valin | 6 September 2014 | released in Venice |

=== Notable filmmakers ===
- Lenin M. Sivam – 1999 (2009), A Gun & a Ring (2013), Roobha (2018)

== Notable personalities ==
- B. H. Abdul Hameed
- K. S. Balachandran

== See also ==
- Sinhala Cinema
- Sri Lankan Tamils in Sinhala Cinema
- Sri Lankan Tamils in Indian cinema
- Tamil cinema
- South Asian cinema
- Cinema of the world
