= List of actors of Tamil origin =

This list outlines the names of notable film actors of ethnic Tamil origin. The names are ordered by the actors' first or stage name.

== Actors ==
- Aari Arujunan
- Ajay Rathnam
- Akhil
- Ameer
- Appukutty
- Arjunan
- Aruldoss
- Arun Pandian
- Arun Vijay
- Arvind Swamy
- Ashok Selvan
- Attakathi Dinesh
- Azhagam Perumal
- Aziz Ansari
- Bala Saravanan
- Bagavathi Perumal
- Besant Ravi
- Bharani
- Bharath
- Bonda Mani
- Ceylon Manohar
- Chaams
- Charle
- Charuhasan
- Crane Manohar
- Darshan Dharmaraj
- Delhi Ganesh
- Dhamu
- Dhanush
- Dhruv Vikram
- Elango Kumaravel
- Ennathe Kannaiah
- G. Marimuthu
- G. Ramanathan
- G.Srinivasan
- Ganja Karuppu
- Gautham Karthik
- Gemini Ganesan
- George Maryan
- Goundamani
- Gowtham Sundararajan
- Gundu Kalyanam
- Guru Somasundaram
- Harish Kalyan
- Idichapuli Selvaraj
- Irfan
- Ilavarasu
- Imman Annachi
- Inigo Prabhakaran
- J. Livingston
- Jai
- Jai Akash
- Jaishankar
- Janagaraj
- Jay Chandrasekhar
- Jayam Ravi (Half Tamil)
- Jayaram
- Jiiva (Half Tamil)
- Jithan Ramesh (Half Tamil)
- K. Balaji
- K. Manikandan
- K. Sarangapani
- K. A. Thangavelu
- K. K. Soundar
- K. R. Ramasamy
- Kalaiyarasan
- Kalloori Vinoth
- Kali N. Rathnam
- Kamal Haasan
- Karthi
- Karthik
- Karunakaran
- Karunas
- Kathir
- Kavin
- King Ratnam
- Kishore DS
- Krishna
- Kullamani
- Kuralarasan
- LIC Narasimhan
- Loose Mohan
- M. K. Radha
- M. K. Thyagaraja Bhagavathar
- M. S. Bhaskar
- Mahanadhi Shankar
- Mansoor Ali Khan
- Manivannan
- Major Sundararajan
- Maran
- Michael Thangadurai
- Mime Gopi
- Mohan Raman
- Munishkanth
- Murali (Half Tamil)
- N. S. Krishnan
- Namo Narayana
- Nandha Durairaj
- Nassar
- Naveen Chandra
- Nellai Siva
- Nithin Sathya
- Nizhalgal Ravi
- O. A. K. Thevar
- O. A. K. Sundar
- Omakuchi Narasimhan
- P. S. Veerappa
- P. U. Chinnappa
- Pandi
- Pandiarajan
- Pandiyan
- Pandu
- Pasi Narayanan
- Pasupathy
- Periya Karuppu Thevar
- Ponnambalam
- Poornam Viswanathan
- Pradeep Ranganathan
- Prabhu
- Prasanna
- Prashanth (Half Tamil)
- Pugazh
- Pyramid Natarajan
- R. Madhavan
- R. Muthuraman
- R. K. Suresh
- R. S. Manohar
- Raghava Lawrence
- Rahul Ravindran
- Rajasekhar
- Rajesh
- Ramarajan
- Ramesh Aravind
- Ramki
- Ravi Mariya
- Ravi Raghavendra
- Ravichandran
- Rajendran
- Rajkiran
- Redin Kingsley
- Robo Shankar
- S.A. Ashokan
- S.J. Suryah
- S. S. Rajendran
- S. V. Ramadas
- S. V. Sahasranamam
- S. V. Venkataraman
- Sadhu Kokila
- Sai Dheena
- Sam Anderson
- Samuthirakani
- Santhanam
- Santhosh Prathap
- Saran Shakthi
- Sarathkumar
- Saravanan
- Sasikumar
- Sathyan
- Sathyaraj
- Scissor Manohar
- Selva
- Selva Rasalingam (Half Tamil)
- Sendhil Ramamurthy (Half Tamil)
- Sendrayan
- Seeman
- Senthil
- Shaam
- Shanmugasundaram
- Shiva
- Sibiraj
- Siddharth (actor)
- Silambarasan
- Singampuli
- Sivakarthikeyan
- Sivaji Ganesan
- Sivakumar
- Soori
- Soundararaja
- Sree Raam
- Sri
- Srikanth (Half Tamil)
- Subbu Panchu
- Sundar Raj
- Suresh Joachim
- Suriya
- Suruli Rajan
- Swaminathan
- T. Rajendar
- T. R. Ramachandran
- T. S. Balaiah
- Teejay Arunasalam
- Thambi Ramaiah
- Thengai Srinivasan
- Thiagarajan
- Thyagu
- V. Gopalakrishnan (actor)
- V. Ravichandran
- V. K. Ramaswamy
- V. I. S. Jayapalan
- V. S. Raghavan
- VTV Ganesh
- Vadivelu
- Vagai Chandrasekhar
- Vasanth Ravi
- Vela Ramamoorthy
- Vennira Aadai Moorthy
- Vetri
- Vidharth
- Vignesh
- Vijay
- Vijay Antony
- Vijay Sethupathi
- Vijay Vasanth
- Vijayakumar
- Vikram
- Vikram Prabhu
- Vikranth
- Vimal
- Vinod Raj
- Vinoth Kishan
- Vivek
- Y. G. Mahendran
- Yogi Babu
- Yugi Sethu

== Actresses ==
- Aathmika
- Abhirami
- Adah Sharma
- Akshara Haasan (Half Tamil)
- Amara Karan
- Ammu Abhirami
- Amritha Aiyer
- Athulya Ravi
- Chandini Tamilarasan (Half Tamil)
- Charithra Chandran
- C. R. Vijayakumari
- C. T. Rajakantham
- Deepa Shankar
- Deepa Venkat
- Dhansika
- Disco Shanthi
- Divyabharathi
- Dushara Vijayan
- E. V. Saroja
- Esha Deol (Half Tamil)
- Gayathrie
- Gandhimathi
- Geraldine Viswanathan (Half Tamil)
- Hema Malini
- Hemalatha
- Indhuja Ravichandran
- Indira Krishnan
- J.Jayalalithaa
- Joshna Fernando
- Janani Iyer
- Jeevitha
- K. Thavamani Devi
- K. B. Sundarambal
- Kalpana Iyer
- Kanika
- Kanmani Manoharan
- Keerthi Pandian
- Keerthy Suresh (Half Tamil)
- Kruthika Jayakumar
- Kumari Rukmani
- Kutty Padmini
- Kuyili
- Lakshmi (actress) (Half Tamil)
- Lakshmi Priyaa Chandramouli
- Lakshmy Ramakrishnan
- Lalitha Kumari
- Latha Sethupathi (Half Tamil)
- M. N. Rajam
- M. R. Santhanalakshmi
- M. S. Subbulakshmi
- Maitreyi Ramakrishnan
- Malavika Avinash
- Manochitra
- Manorama
- Meenakshi Seshadri
- Meera Vasudevan
- Meghana Raj (Half Tamil)
- Menaka
- Mirnalini Ravi
- Mrudhula Bhaskar
- N. C. Vasanthakokilam
- Nanditha Jennifer
- Niranjani Shanmugaraja
- Nisha Krishnan
- Nivetha Pethuraj
- Ooha
- P. A. Periyanayaki
- Padma Lakshmi
- Padmapriya Janakiraman
- Poornima Bhagyaraj
- Poornima Indrajith
- Preity Mukhundhan
- Priya Anand (Half Tamil)
- Priyanka Arul Mohan (Half Tamil)
- Priya Bhavani Shankar
- Priyamani
- Preetha Vijayakumar (Half Tamil)
- Radhika Preeti (Half Tamil)
- Ramya Krishnan (Half Tamil)
- Ramya Pandian
- Ranjitha
- Rathi Arumugam
- Regina Cassandra
- Rekha (Half Tamil)
- Rukmani Devi
- Rukmini Vijayakumar
- Rupa Manjari
- Riythvika
- S. N. Lakshmi
- Sanchana Natarajan
- Sangeetha Krish
- Sathyakala
- Sathyapriya
- Semmalar Annam
- Shammu
- Shanthi Krishna
- Sheela Rajkumar
- Shivani Rajashekar
- Shivathmika Rajashekar
- Shruti Hassan (Half Tamil)
- Simone Ashley
- Sri Priyanka
- Sridevi (Half Tamil)
- Sridevi Vijayakumar (Half Tamil)
- Sripriya
- Srividya
- Sruthi Hariharan
- Sukanya
- Suhasini Mani Ratnam
- Sumathi
- Swarnamalya
- Tanya Ravichandran
- Teju Ashwini
- Trisha (actress)
- T. A. Madhuram
- T. R. Rajakumari
- T. P. Rajalakshmi
- T. V. Rathnam
- Tharini Mudaliar
- U. R. Jeevarathnam
- V. N. Janaki (Half Tamil)
- Vadivukkarasi
- Vanitha Krishnachandran
- Varshini Sounderajan
- Vasundhara Devi
- Vasundhara Kashyap (Half Tamil)
- Varalaxmi Sarathkumar
- Vidya Balan
- Vidyullekha Raman
- Vimala Raman
- Vindhya
- Vinodhini Vaidyanathan
- Vijayalakshmi Agathiyan
- Vyjanthimala
