= Hiru Golden Film Awards =

- Current: 3rd Hiru Golden Film Awards
- Trophy of the award
- Awarded for: Excellence in cinema achievements
- Country: Sri Lanka
- Presented by: Asia Broadcasting Corporation
- First award: 2014
- Final award: 2018
- Website: www.hirugoldenfilmawards.lk//

Hiru Golden Film Awards (Sinhala:හිරු රන් සිනමා සම්මාන) is an award bestowed to distinguished individuals involved with the Sri Lanka's silver screen, awarded by the Asia Broadcasting Corporation, Sri Lanka and organised by Hiru TV, in recognition of the contributions made by them to the Sri Lankan cinema industry. First commenced in 2014, is held every two years, Hiru Golden Film Awards ceremony is one of the most popular cinematic program events in Sri Lanka. The ceremony was held thrice with the participation of popular Bollywood film stars along with Sri Lanka's finest stars together.

== 2014 ==
32 awards were given. The ceremony witnessed the participation of Bollywood stars - Vivek Oberoi, Alka Yagnik, Anil Kapoor, Suniel Shetty and Bipasha Basu.

=== Popular Category ===
- Most Popular Actress - Yashoda Wimaladharma
- Most Popular Child Actor - Pramuditha Udaya Kumara

=== Best Category ===
- Best Film - Ini Avan
- Best Actor in Leading Role (Male) - Darshan Dharmaraj (Ini Avan)
- Best Actor in Leading Role (Female) - Chandani Seneviratne (Nikini Vassa)
- Best Script - Aruna Jayawardena (Nikini Vassa)
- Best Cinematography - Palitha Perera (Karma)
- Best Editor - Ajith Ramanayake (Ini Avan)
- Best Background Music - Nadeeka Guruge
- Most Promising Actor - Jagath Manuwarna (Nikini Vassa)
- Most Promising Actress - Sulochana Weerasinghe (Nikini Vassa)
- Most Promising Director - Aruna Jayawardena (Nikini Vassa)
- Best Music Director - Dharshana Ruwan Dissanayake (Samanala Sandhawaniya)
- Best Make-up - Jayantha Ranawaka (Nikini Vassa)
- Best Visual Effects - Boodee Keerthisena (Matha)
- Best South Effects - Lionel Gunaratne & Shashika Sandaruwan (Karma)
- Best Production Management - Sunil Wijeratne
- Best Lyrics - Amila Thenuwara (Samanala Sandhawaniya)

=== Special awards ===
- Soorya Dayaruwan (Samanala Sandhawaniya)
- Yasoda Rajakrishnan (Matha)

=== Life Time Award ===
- Swarna Mallawarachchi
- Andrew Jayamanna

== 2016 ==
42 awards were given. The ceremony witnessed the participation of six Bollywood stars - Sridevi, Madhuri Dixit, Jackie Shroff, Suniel Shetty, Karisma Kapoor and Neil Nitin Mukesh.

=== Popular Category ===
- Most Popular Actress - Udari Perera (Pravegaya)
- Most Popular Film - Maharaja Gemunu
- Most Popular Movie Song of the Year - Dinesh Subasinghe Ho Gaana Pukune of Ho Gaana Pokuna
- Most Popular Child Actor - Thrishakya Kumaranatunga (Ho Gaana Pokuna)

=== Best Category ===
- Best Actor in Leading Role (Female) - Kaushalya Fernando (Bora Diya Pokuna)
- Best Actor in a Supporting (Male) - Mahendra Perera (Address Na)
- Best Actor in a Supporting (Female)- Kusum Renu (Maharaja Gemunu)
- Best Actor in Negative Role - Dayadeva Edirisinghe (Ho Gaana Pokuna)
- Best Actor in Comic Role - Jayalath Manoratne (Ho Gaana Pokuna)
- Best Script - Prasanna Vithanage (Oba Nathuwa Oba Ekka)
- Best Lyrics - Rev. Pallegama Hemarathana Thero (Maharaja Gemunu)
- Best Music Director - Anupa Khemadasa, Gayathri Khemadasa (Thanha Rathi Ranga)
- Best Playback music - Rohana Weerasinghe (Maharaja Ajasath)
- Best Playback Singer (Male) - Sunil Edirisinghe (Siri Daladagamanaya)
- Best Playback Singer (Female) - Nirosha Virajini (Maharaja Gemunu)
- Best Short Film - Tharindu Lokuarachchi
- Best Sound Editor - Thapas Nayak (Thanha Rathi Ranga)
- Best Visual Effect - Chamath Paranavithana (Maharaja Gemunu)
- Best Choreography - Gayan Srimal (Spandana)
- Best Make-up - Harsha Manjula (Address Na)

=== Special awards ===
- Jury Award - Jackson Anthony (Maharaja Gemunu)
- Jury First Award - Anjali Methsara (Ho Gaana Pokuna)
- Jury Second Award - Dhanushka Gunathilake (Thanha Rathi Ranga) cinematography
- Jury Third Award - Sathyajith Maitipe (Bora Diya Pokuna) script and direction
- Jury Fourth Award - Chamil Jayanetti (Butterfly) short film
- Contribution to the Asian cinema - Sridevi

=== Life Time Award ===
- Ravindra Randeniya

== 2018 ==
The third Hiru Golden award Ceremony was held on 27 October 2018 at the Sugathadasa Indoor stadium. 40 awards were given in the ceremony. The ceremony witnessed the participation of seven Bollywood stars - Govinda, Shilpa Shetty, Sonakshi Sinha, Saif Ali Khan, Juhi Chawla, Sidharth Malhotra and Zareen Khan.

=== Popular Category ===
- Most Popular Actor - Uddika Premarathna
- Most Popular Actress - Pooja Umashankar
- Most Popular Film - Paththini
- Most Popular Movie Song of the Year - Edibinda Manabanda of Aloko Udapadi
- Most Popular Child Actor - Vinumi Wasandi (Dharmayuddhaya)

=== Best Category ===
- Best Director - Prasanna Jayakody (28)
- Best Film - Let Her Cry
- Best Actor in Leading Role (Male) - Dasun Pathirana - (Sayapethi Kusuma)
- Best Actor in Leading Role (Female) - Swarna Mallawarachchi - (Let Her Cry)
- Best Actor in a Supporting (Male) - Kumara Thirimadura (Dharmayuddhaya)
- Best Actor in a Supporting (Female)- Umali Thilakarathne (A Level)
- Best Actor in Negative Role - Cyril Wickramage (Bandhanaya)
- Best Actor in Comic Role - Mahendra Perera (Hora Police)
- Best Script - Asoka Handagama (Let Her Cry)
- Best Cinematography - Channa Deshapriya (Let Her Cry)
- Best Editing - Tissa Surendra (Motor Bicycle)
- Best Lyrics - Sunil Ariyaratne (Paththini) -Sansare Giri Durgaya Nam
- Best Music Director - Rohana Weerasinghe (Sarigama)
- Best Playback Singer (Male) - Amarasiri Peiris (Paththini)
- Best Playback Singer (Female) - Uresha Ravihari(Sarigama) - Me Seetha Ude
- Best Short Film - Roshan Edward (Through the Holes)
- Best Sound Editor - Aruna Priyantha Kaluarachchie & Alexander Yusuf (Nimnayaka Hudekalawa)
- Best Stunt Coordination - Sandun Fernando (Aloko Udapadi)
- Best Visual Effect - Chathra Weeraman & Baratha Hettiarachchi (Aloko Udapadi)
- Best Choreography - Gayan Srimal (Dedunu Akase)
- Best Art Direction - Sunil Wijeratne (Aloko Udapadi)
- Best Costume Design - Methnuwan Wijesinghe (Sarigama)
- Most Promising Director - Sameera Naotunna (Motor Bicycle)
- Most Promising Male Award - Dineth De Silva (Aloko Udapadi)
- Most Promising Female Award - Rithika Kodithuwakku (Let Her Cry)

=== Talent awards ===
- Jury First Award - Prasanna Vithanage (Silence in the Courts) direction
- Jury Second Award - Kalpana Ariyawansha & Vindana Ariyawansha (Premaya Nam) direction
- Jury Third Award - Thisara Imbulana (Nino Live) direction
- Jury Fourth Award - Tharindu Madushanka (Forzen Heart) short film

=== Certificates ===
- Certificate - Kusum Renu - for the role Vishaka (Dharmayuddhaya)
- Certificate - Lahiruka Ekanayaka - for the role Ahinsa (A Level)

=== Special awards ===
- Contribution to the Asian cinema - Govinda Ahuja
- Contribution to the Sri Lankan cinema - Dharmasena Pathiraja
- Contribution to the Sri Lankan cinema - Lester James Peiris
- Hiru Award for the New Trend - Hemal Ranasinghe

=== Life Time Award ===
- Malani Fonseka
