= Niranjani Shanmugaraja =

Sri Lankan actress and announcer

- Occupation: actress
- Years active: 2012-present
- Known for: Ini Avan; Komaali Kings; Girivassipura; Tsunami
- Awards: Best actress - Hiru Golden Film Award; Best actress - Derana lux film awards 2013

Niranjani Shanmugaraja also known as Niranjani Shanmugarajah (Tamil: நிரஞ்சனி சண்முகராஜா, Sinhala: නිරන්ජණි ශණ්මුගරාජා) is a Sri Lankan award-winning actress in Sri Lankan Sinhalese and Tamil Cinema. She also works as a television host in Sri Lanka Rupavahini Corporation.

== Career ==
She made her acting debut in the award-winning drama film Ini Avan as a supporting actress which starred Darshan Dharmaraj and Subashini Balasubramaniyam in the lead roles. She was awarded the Best supporting actress for the film, Ini Avan for her critically acclaimed performance as a civilian in the movie during the Hiru Golden Film Award held in 2014. Also she won Best Actress award at Derana lux film awards 2013. She played the role of lead actress for the first time in the Tamil film, Komaali Kings which is considered as a landmark movie in Sri Lankan Tamil cinema after being released in 2018.

In 2021, she appeared in the Raffealla Fernando Celebrity Calendar along with many other Sri Lankan celebrities. In the same year, she won the award for the Best Actress at BAYELSA International Film Festival for her role in the 2020 film Tsunami.

== Filmography ==
Key
†	Denotes films that have not yet been released

Year	Film	Role	Language	Notes
2012	Ini Avan		Tamil	Best Supporting Actress - Hiru Golden Film Award (2014)
2016	Red Butterfly Dream	Rajini	Sinhala	
2017	Sons and Fathers		Sinhala	
2018	Komaali Kings	Yoga	Tamil	Playing the lead actress role for the first time
2018	Girivassipura		Sinhala	
2020	Tsunami	Kalyani	Sinhala	
2022	Praana		Multilingual	
2023	Soppana Sundhari		Tamil	
2024	Sinhabahu		Sinhala	
TBA	Adare Aththamai †		Sinhala	

== See also ==
- Sri Lankan Tamils in Sinhala Cinema
