= Anoma Janadari =

Sri Lankan actress and author

- අනෝමා ජනාදරී
- Born: Sri Lanka
- Occupations: Actress, Dramatist, Author
- Years active: 1985–present
- Spouse: Asoka Handagama
- Awards: Best Actress

Anoma Janadari (also spelled Anoma Janadare) is an actress in Sri Lankan cinema, stage drama and television. She has acted in critically acclaimed roles in the films Thani Thatuwen Piyabanna and Davena Wihagun.

== Career ==
She started acting career with the stage drama Hitler in 1985 and Percy Perera's drama, Nara Lovin Ekek Aapi. Then she continued to act in many plays including Hena, Maghatha, Veniceye Welenda, Polina, Gandhi, Makarakshya, Eedipas, Samawenna Weradeemak and Sinhabhau Lawa Gassawa. Her maiden television acting came through 1990 serial Prabathaya. Some of her popular television serials are Dunhinda Addara and Diyaketa Pahana. He maiden cinematic experience came through 1992 film Channa Kinnariya.

She played leading roles in Burning Birds, Thani Thatuwen Piyabanna (Flying with One Wing) and This Is My Moon. In 2008, she acted in the stage play Suppadevi.* Sadgunakaraya

On 3 May 2011, she launched her auto biography Punarukthi - Mage Kathawa in a ceremony at Sri Lanka Television Training Institute at 4.00 pm. At the same occasion, she launched her official website as well.

== Awards and accolades ==
She won the best actress award at Singapore International Film Festival 2003 for Flying with One Wing, and Asian World Film Festival 2017 in Los Angeles, USA for a role of Kusum in the film Burning Birds. She also won the best actress award for the same movie at the SAARC film festival 2019, and the Seventh Derana Lux Film Awards 2019. In 2003, she was the best actress in the 16th Singapore International Film Festival.

=== Singapore International Film Festival ===
Year	Nominee / work	Award	Result
2003	Thani Thatuwen Piyabanna	Best Actress	Won

=== Asian World Film Festival ===
Year	Nominee / work	Award	Result
2017	Davena Wihagun	Best Actress	Won

=== Derana Film Awards ===
Year	Nominee / work	Award	Result
2018	Davena Wihagun	Best Actress	Won

=== Presidential Film Awards ===
Year	Nominee / work	Award	Result
2018	Davena Wihagun	Best Actress	Won
2019	Davena Wihagun	Vishwakeerthi Award	Won

=== SAARC Film Festival ===
Year	Nominee / work	Award	Result
2019	Davena Wihagun	Best Actress	Won

=== SIGNIS Awards ===
Year	Nominee / work	Award	Result
2018	Davena Wihagun	Best Actress	Won

== Filmography ==
Year	Film	Role	Ref.
1992	Channa Kinnariya		
2001	Me Mage Sandai		
2003	Thani Thatuwen Piyabanna	Manju	
2018	Davena Wihagun	Kusum	
