= Mannar martyrs =

In 1544, during the Crisis of the Sixteenth Century (1521–1597) in the Jaffna Kingdom, Cankili I killed 600 Catholic Christian converts. Portuguese missionaries attributed the baptism, martyrdom and intercession of the Mannar Martyrs; to the rapid conversion and growth of Catholic Christianity in Sri Lanka. In a letter found in the archives of the Society of Jesus (Jesuits) dated 19 December 1561, Anrique Anriquez, the first Mannar parish priest (1561–1564), gives details of how rapidly the island was converted, and how churches and hospitals were built all around the island. The Christians of the island of Mannar were held up as a model. He wrote since their arrival, over a thousand people converted to Christianity.

A Sri Lankan trilingual film named Praana ('Praana' in Sinhala, 'Seeds' in English and 'Viththukkal' in Tamil), directed by Sanjaya Nirmal was made in 2022, based on this incident.

== The zeal of the inhabitants of Mannar to become Christians ==
In their book on the life of St. Francis Xavier, Daniello Bartoli and Giovanni Maffei stated “that of the many various States which sent to ask Xavier to come and impart the light of Gospel none is so deserving of remembrance, none deserving of praise as we say of a holy envy as the Mannarese who prove themselves the beautiful models and masters of patience and heroic fortitude to the whole of that new Eastern Church. With them the reception of Baptism and shedding of their blood, the birth unto Christ and their death for Christ went hand in hand. So rapidly did the fruit ripen of which God has blessed the seed, that they who yesterday were idolaters and today Christians and would be tomorrow be Martyrs”.

Jesuit historian Fernão de Queiróz expressed similar admiration towards the deputation. “The chief men of Mannar moved by Divine Spirit send deputation to St Francis Xavier to signify to him the disposition that were therein and the importance of his visiting and account which he would have to give to God if he failed to visit.” They had heard of the devotion and the earnestness and personal holiness of St. Francis and of the conversion of those in India. The deputation from Mannar came from the homogenous community in Careapatao. Since the saint was engaged in baptising and pastoral care of new converts he was unable to go at that time. St Francis Xavier chose a native cleric, Francis Xavier and told him “I entrust to you the enterprise of Mannar. Wherein I trust in the Lord you will reap such great fruits. Go my son, and may God help you”. Cleric Francis set out at once with the envoys, who though they regretted not to take the saint with them were greatly relieved to learn from him they would have him later on in that island. Cleric Francis Xavier reached Mannar where he was well received and in a short time catechised a vast number of inhabitants of Mannar. He baptised up to six hundred person with usual ceremonies, thoroughly well grounded in the Faith as their constancy showed.

== The Martyrdom ==
The temple priests learned the reports of a new religion and marched to Nallur to represent to the King Cankili I the outrage of a Minister of another religion going about his territories perverting the people and setting against him. They told the king new converts razing temples and idols and an unknown God was worshiped in their place. They told him unless he took prompt action, he would soon find himself without a kingdom, idols and temples. The king issued an edict “renounce Christianity or die”. The new converts many who were in the service of this King in Mannar could have foreseen the consequence they would face by becoming Christians because they were aware the tyrant king who seized the throne in 1519 hate of Portuguese and Christianity. The king immediately mustered five thousand men from the coast of mainland and Jaffnapatnam and set out for Mannar. He met with no other resistance than that of tears which some shed out of consolation and joy at seeing the constancy with which others died. The smallest children crying out when their mothers tried to hide them from seeing their companions beheaded, they offered their throat to the executioners with the wonderful power of faith. The king known for his other tyrannies was their Captain and spared neither sex nor age.

Daniello Bartoli & Giovanni Maffei provide a similar account about the martyrdom. The edict was executed with as much cruelty as it was given, without distinction of age, sex or rank. Men, women, youth and infancy, in a word whoever received baptism were ruthlessly slaughtered. The king swore not to leave one of them alive. Admirable indeed were the effects of Grace of Baptism. As each one in turn was asked whether he or she were Christian, whereas a negative answer would at once have placed their lives in a safety so generous were these neophytes that far from having recourse to subterfuge, they boldly confessed the Faith. Fathers and mothers answering for their little ones to whom age has yet denied the power of speech. Between six and seven hundred were slain on this occasion. The place of their Martyrdom called Pasim(Patim) deserve a more noble name and accordingly from this date it has been called the Land of Martyrs.

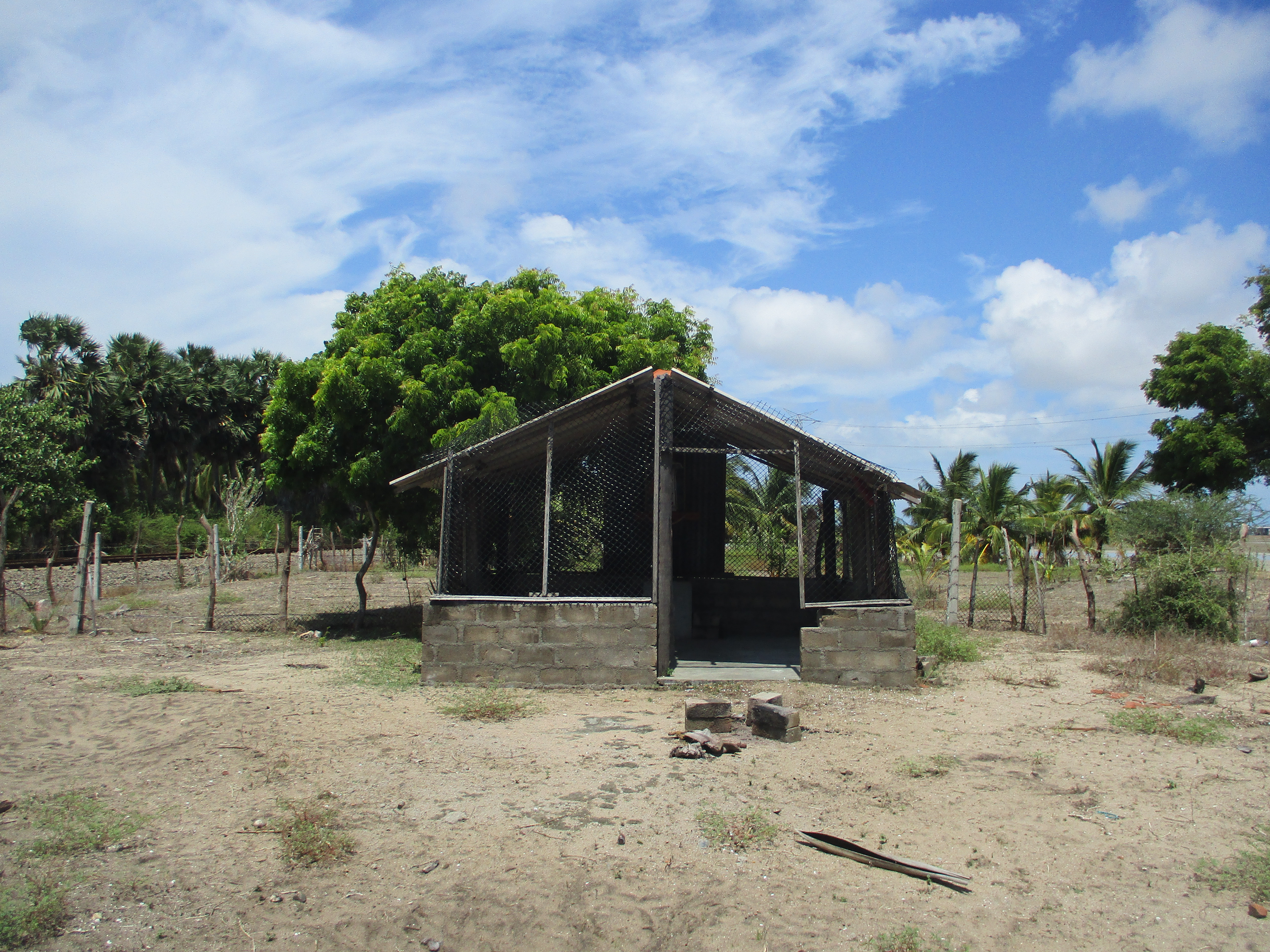
Relics and place of martyrdom of Mannar Catholic Martyrs, 1544

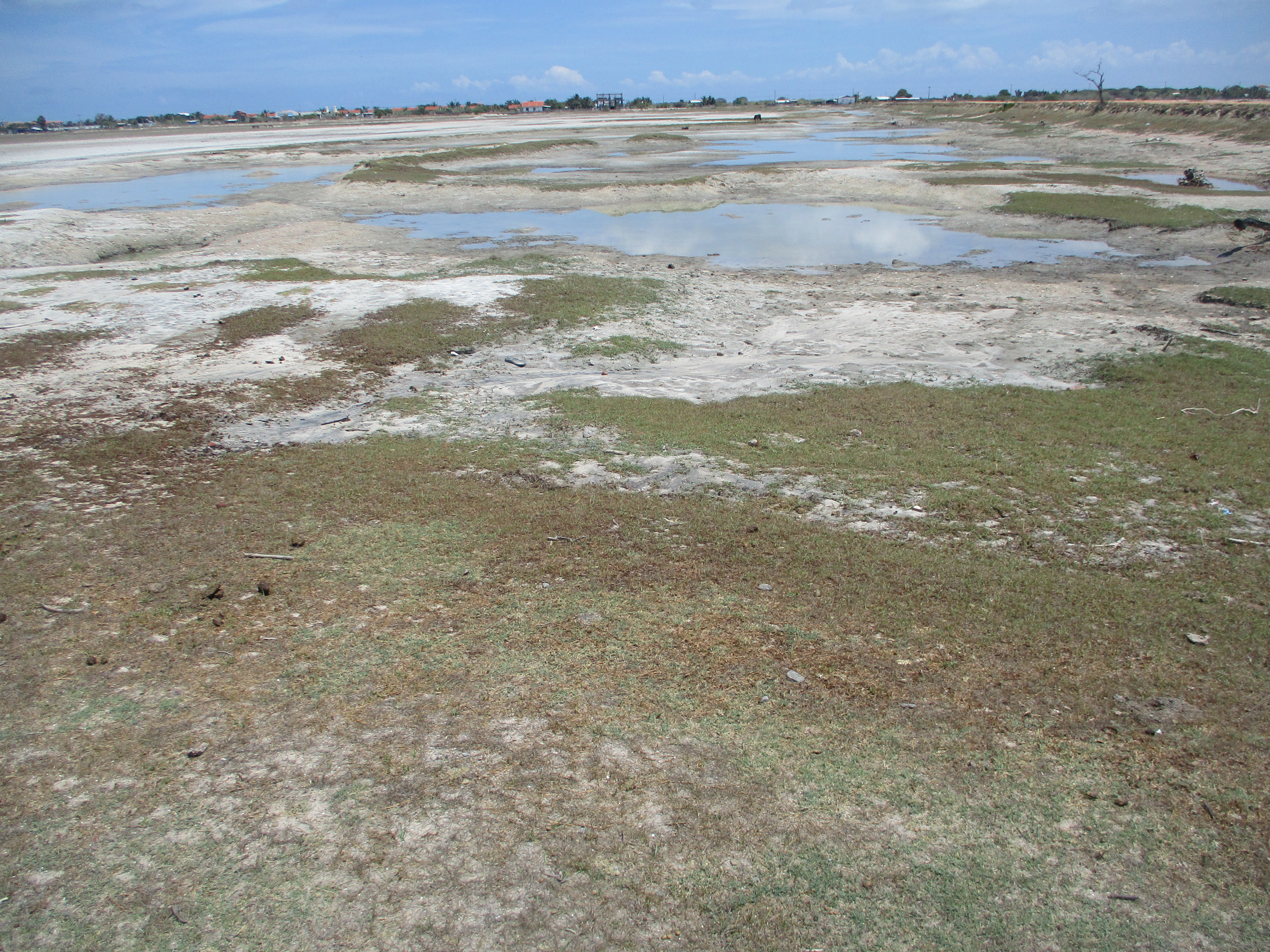
The adjoining place of martyrdom of Catholic Martyrs Pattim

Queiroz mentioned Cleric Francis Xavier and Uraccinga (llam Singai) a sort of Governor- tributary prince were martyred. There is also an old tradition recorded by Dr. Bonjean in the Missions Catholiques of Lyons that the king and his executioners were on hot pursuit for a convert named Santa Cruz as he had been going about among the Christians comforting and encouraging them to lay down their lives joyfully for God. Executioners severed his head with one stroke of the sword. Martyrdom likely occurred between October 1544 and December 1544, most likely in November or early December. The Portuguese called Mannar Island Illa dos Martyres.

Henrique Henriques in his letter dated December 19, 1561 wrote “half a league from the Fortress is place which they called Patim”. He stated in it were the Christians of the same island who were already Christians before they came to this Island. He further wrote “ It is true that at the time we came to inhabit it they were out of the said island on account of the injuries (cruelties) done by the king of that country with whom we were at war and are so now”. He stated there were two villages where Christians lived and a little more than a league from Patim there is a larger village of Christians Some of the converts who had escaped by boats to Mantota in mainland returned to their village at Patim when Jesuits of the Fishery Coast came to Mannar with their flocks in 1560. Carea patao according to Georg Schurhammer, refers to the little village of Patim. Christians of the smaller village were the first converts of Cleric Francis Xavier.

In 1945 Fr. Antoninus, O.M.I. using ancient maps of Mannar from Survey Department find the site known to local residents as Paddi Theravai (open plain of Patti) about half a mile west of the 2nd mile post on Mannar- Talaimannar Rord to be the location of Patim. Excavation carried out by Fr. Antoninus in that location found ruins of a Church, a broken down altar, and several skeletons lying in all directions, some belonging to children, others with heads got separated. Also a skeleton lying with head slightly turned and part of the bones on the edges showed reddish colour. New converts would have congregated for prayers and were massacred and place of worship destroyed to wipe out Christianity. Fr. Antoninus also found a coin and Dr. Paranavitana then archeologist identified it as a Roman coin with words "Claudius Imperator" that suggest the possibility of Christian community in Mannar during Roman time when Mantota was the centre of International trade route.

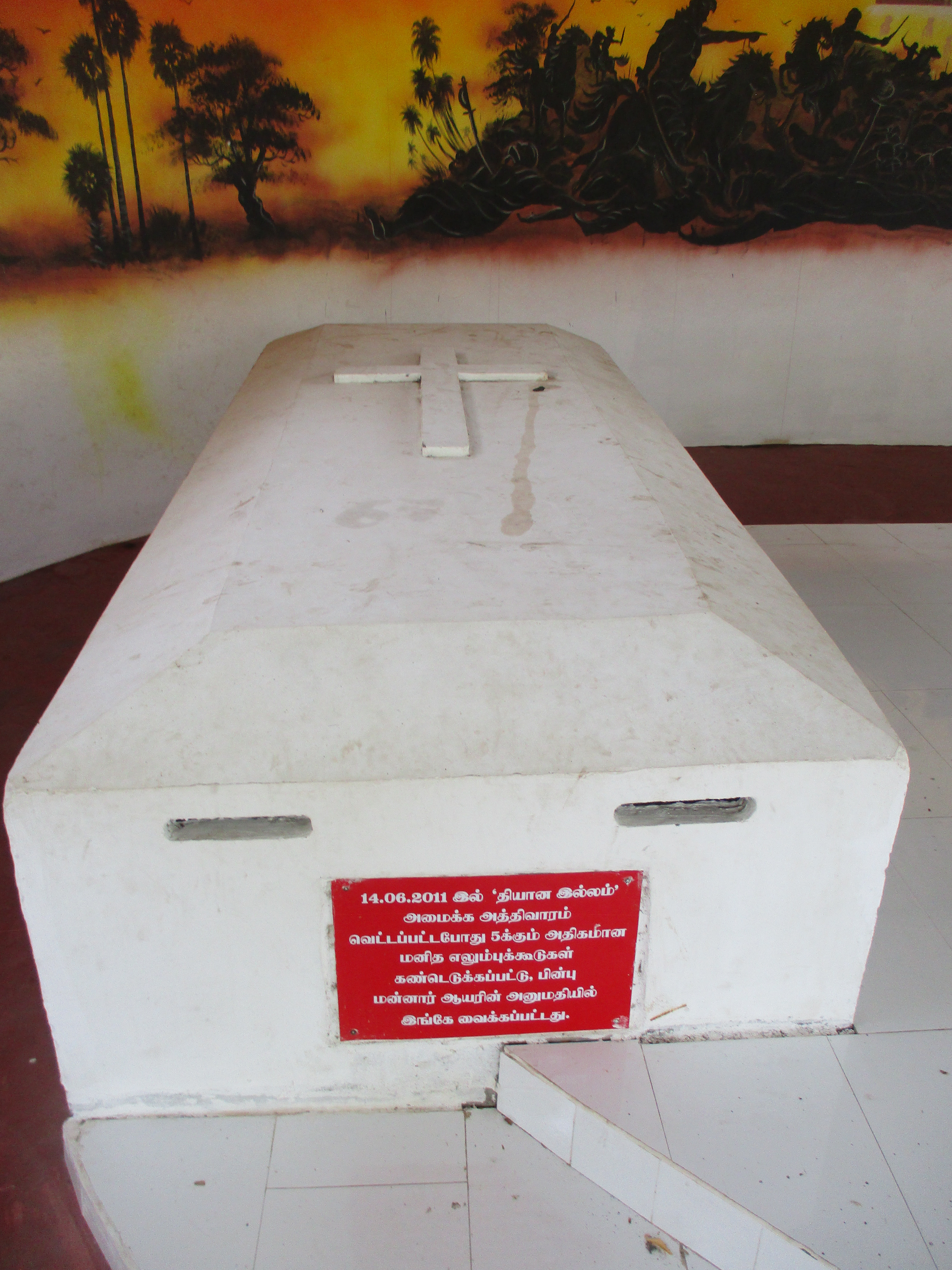
Relics of Catholic Martyrs Mannar Island

In 2018, while excavating for building construction near Mannar Fort over 300 human skeletal remains including children were found. Hundreds of people also died due to pestilence few years after the killing of new converts. Investigations are being carried out to find the cause of death. According to Carbon dating done by Beta Analytic, the samples belong to a period 1400 AD to 1650 AD.

== Cause for Canonization ==
The Vatican Congregation for the Causes of Saints had given the go-ahead for the diocesan inquiry for the canonisation. Prior to the establishment of Congregation in 1588, martyrs were recognised for their heroic virtue were declared saints by local churches. St Francis Xavier, under the Padroado agreement was the ambassador of the Pope Paul III and King John III missionary to the East Indies. Since St Francis Xavier and missionaries considered Mannar Martyrs as Blessed and sought Martyrs intercession before God, Mannar martyrs thus seemed to meet the criteria of that time to be considered as martyrs of Catholic church.

St. Francis Xavier in his letter dated January 27, 1545 to Jesuit fathers in Rome wrote “Thanks be given to God our Lord because we do not lack martyrs in our time. And that while he sees so few souls themselves of all his divine mercy and indulgence to work out their salvation. He permits in the mystery of his providence that human barbarity should fill up the destined ranks and number of the Blessed.”

Miguel Vaz, the Vicar General of Goa when he reached Portugal in October 1545, gave detail account of the Martyrdom to king John III as he heard from St. Francis Xavier. King immediately wrote to Jesuit Superior asking for more missionaries to be sent to India. Fr. Le Fevre, the Visiting General of the Jesuits exclaimed “I do not know to give expression to all that my soul has felt in Jesus Christ on learning about the glorious death of the six hundreds Martyrs of India. How happy we would be if we could possess in Europe the relics of their bodies and of their blood- we who are the elders in Faith."

Dominique Bouhours in his book, the life of St.Francis Xavier mentioned about St Francis Xavier visit to Mannar and praying to God offering the merits of the Martyrs to end pestilence in Mannar. When Saint Francis Xavier visited Mannar after the martyrdom, he reverently kissed the ground which had been moistened with the blood of martyrs of Pasim (Patim). While he rejoiced at the happiness of the dead, he had the reason to be afflicted at the misery of the living as a contagious disease laid waste the island and daily carried off a hundred persons. When Manarese were told that the great father so celebrated throughout India was at Pasim, three thousand of them most of whom were pagans assembled and most earnestly besought him to deliver them from the pestilence. Xavier demanded three days that he might ask of God the favour which they sought. During this time his prayer principally consisted in offering up to God the merits of the blessed Martyrs who had suffered for his name at Pasim. Before the termination of the three days, his prayers were heard. The plague ceased and all the sick were simultaneously restored to health. So visible an interposition of God's power caused them to believe in Jesus Christ and demand baptism which they received from the Apostle.

== External references ==
- Martyrs of Mannar. https://defonseka.com/wp-content/uploads/2022/07/Martyrs-of-Mannar.pdf
- The miraculous plague cure in Mannar. The life of St Francis Xavier, by Dominque Bouhours, page 177-179.University of Oxford text archive. http://tei.it.ox.ac.uk/tcp/Texts-HTML/free/A28/A28873.html#index.xml-body.1_div.3
- Illa dos Martyres: Island of Martyrs. http://archives1.sundayobserver.lk/2017/11/05/culture/illa-dos-matryres-island-martyrs
- Martyrdom of new converts.The life of St. Francis Xavier, Apostle of Indies & Japan by Daniello Bartoli, page 108. Cornell University, Internet Archive.https://archive.org/details/cu31924031265865
- A History of Christianity in Asia, Africa & Latin America by Koschorke, Ludwig & Delado, page 26. A History of Christianity in Asia, Africa & Latin America
- A Movie. Mannar Martyrs https://www.sundaytimes.lk/220206/magazine/a-movie-on-1544-mannar-massacre-471058.html
