= Prema Yin =

- Born: Prema Yin Ranee A/P Kali Kavandan; 3 October 1986 (age 39)
- Origin: Seremban, Negri Sembilan, Malaysia
- Genres: Pop rock
- Occupation: Singer/songwriter/performer
- Years active: 2004–present
- Website: Official website

Prema Yin Ranee A/P Kali Kavandan (born 3 October 1986), known by her stage name Prema Yin, is a Malaysian singer musician and former contestant of Who Will Win Malaysia Topstar, where she first became widely known to the public.

== Biography ==
Prema Yin was born 3 October 1986 in Seremban, Negri Sembilan, Malaysia as the youngest of five children. Two of her older brothers (Keevan Raj and Logan Raj) are retired Malaysia national field hockey team players who participated in the Sydney Olympics in 2000.

Prema Yin started singing at the age of three and was entertaining crowds on private functions. At the age of 14, she started writing her own material. Being proficient on piano and guitar, she wrote countless pieces and kept them for herself.

== Who Will Win Malaysia Topstar ==
In 2004, she joined the nationwide singing competition Who Will Win Malaysia's Topstar and emerged as the winner. Besides winning the cash price, she also received a recording contract with Syncrosound studios.

== Musical career ==
As she felt she was not ready yet to take on the music industry after winning the reality TV show, she decided to hit the Pubscene and joined world music outfit Aseana Percussion Unit to gain more experience as a performer. Participating in numerous band competitions with her band "Broken View", she slowly ventured into the indie scene and worked her ways around there performing at many of Kuala Lumpur's underground music venues.

After splitting up with her band, she joined International Groove Collective (IGC) where she blended her vocals with the eclectic music style of the 3-piece band. By August 2007, IGC called it quits and the band members pursued their own careers. Having carved her teeth in the indie circuit, Prema Yin finally started recording and performing her original compositions.

She hit the studios with AIM- and ARIA-winning record producer Greg Henderson to record her debut EP Eyo Eyo.

Prema Yin premiered her first single Bleed in 2008 to the Malaysian public and managed to reach number No. 1 on the Hitz.fm MET10 and No. 3 on Fly FM Campur charts for several weeks and subsequently gained heavy rotation on Fly FM and Hitz.fm.

She released Eyo Eyo in August 2009 with 5 tracks, one in Bahasa Malaysia and four in English. The title track Eyo Eyo is in Bahasa Malaysia. The English version of Eyo Eyo has been released separately in 2011 in the United States on iTunes and other online stores. The music video for Eyo Eyo was produced and directed by the team of Phuture Phlow and launched on the same date with the EP in Mist Club Bangsar.

The response from the media was very positive and Prema Yin got branded as the new "Rock Princess" of Malaysia. Local star sessionists Jamie Wilson and Eric Li have contributed playing on several tracks.

Eyo Eyo was a critical hit that gained four nominations in AIM 17 in 2010. Despite not winning any awards, she was humbled by the fact that she was nominated and recognised by the Malaysian music industry.

Prema Yin toured and played in Japan, Singapore, Germany, United States, China, and Thailand, and in festivals such as the Penang Jazz Festival and Rock the World 10.

Late 2010, Prema Yin signed a management deal with reputable US artist management company TC Music, LLC.

In 2011, she released her next single Marilah which was accompanied by a music video directed by Gambit Saifullah. The video got over 100,000 hits in the first week of release and as, of 2012, over 450,000 views. The video was regarded as controversial and "not suitable" for Malaysian culture as it was considered too "explicit" for the audience. The English version of Marilah is called Addicted and uses the same video, shot in English. This version of the video has been viewed over 120,000 times to date.

In May 2011, Prema Yin travelled to Los Angeles and started working with producers and composers such as Scott Krippayne, Dan Hoal, The Highschoolers, Ra Domini. Prema met and worked with American songwriter Hope Raney and German producer Florian Reutter for her 2012 song "Prove It To Me", to broaden her style.

Prema Yin has been chosen to be one of the performers for the Arthur's Day 2011 celebrations in Malaysia that took place on September, 23rd at Speed City KL alongside other performers like Taio Cruz, The Kartel (featuring Joe Flizzow), Dandee, Take-T, Soler, Mizz Nina, and Dragon Red. The event was attended by a 20,000 strong audience, and marked the celebration of Arthur Guinness singing the lease for his brewery in Dublin, Ireland in 1759.

== Awards & recognitions ==
=== VIMA 2011 nominations ===
- Best Pop/R&B Song – Addicted
- Best Rock Song – Blow my Mind feat. MON9
- Best Rock Vocalist
- Best Female Vocalist Overall (won Gold Award)
- Best Music Video – Addicted

=== Hollywood Music in Media Awards 2011 nominations ===
- Best Pop Song in a Movie – Eyo Eyo in A Novel Romance

=== AIM17 2010 nominations ===
- Best New Artist
- Best Music Video – Eyo Eyo
- Best Engineered Album
- Best Arrangement in a Song – Eyo Eyo

=== AVIMA 2010 nominations ===
- Best Female Vocalist Overall
- Best Pop Song – Eyo Eyo
- Asian Anthem of the Year – Eyo Eyo (won)

=== VIMA 2010 nominations ===
- Best Female Vocalist Overall
- Best Pop Song – Eyo Eyo (won Gold Award)
- Best Rock Vocalist
- Best Music Video – Eyo Eyo

=== VIMA 2009 nominations ===
- Best Female Vocalist
- Best Rock Vocalist (won Bronze Award; only girl in this category)
- Best Rock Song – Bleed
- Best of luck

=== Chart Success ===
August 2009

- Bleed No. 1 on hitz.fm MET 10 and No. 3 on Fly FM Campur Charts

May 2010

- Eyo Eyo No. 1 on hitz.fm MET 10 and No. 2 on Fly FM Campur Charts

December 2010

- Blow my Mind (feat. MON9) No. 1 on hitz.fm MET 10 and No. 2 on Fly FM Campur Charts

January 2012

- Superstar No. 1 on Traxx.fm Upstage Charts
- Eyo Eyo No. 1 on Indonesian Radio Station Ardan.fm "Ardan Indie 7”
- Eyo Eyo No. 2 on Indonesian Radio Station FB9020FM PURWAKARTA

May 2012

- Prove It to Me No. 1 on hitz.fm MET10

== Discography ==
=== Eyo Eyo EP (2009) ===
- Eyo Eyo (Bahasa Malaysia)
- Ain't got Tears (featuring Moots! of Pop Shuvit)
- These are the Days
- Bleed
- Higher Love

=== Singles ===
- Marilah (2010)
- Addicted (2011)
- Fight (feat. Reefa) – theme song in Project O&O (2011)
- Superstar – theme song for Share the Love and in Julie's Biscuit (2011)
- Prove It To Me (2012)
