= Sri Lankan Tamils in Sinhala cinema =

Tamil cinema in Sri Lanka is not as developed as Sinhala cinema or its Indian counterpart, the Tamil cinema of Kodambakkam, Chennai, Tamil Nadu. This is especially due to the high production rates of the influential commercial Tamil films from Tamil Nadu, India and the long run ethnic civil war in Sri Lanka. Tamils contributed significantly to Sinhala cinema as well as Indian Tamil cinema, also known as Kollywood. Only a few Tamil language films were produced in the Northern Province of Sri Lanka. Earlier Tamil movies produced were all most destroyed or unrecovered due to civil war.

== Producers and directors ==
- S. M. Nayagam, a Sri-Lankan Tamil of Indian origin, was the first producer of a Sinhala film Kadawunu Poronduwa (roughly translated as "Broken Promise"), which was produced in 1947. Since production and technical facilities were unavailable in Sri Lanka at the time all production work was completed in Madurai, South India. He went on to produce many other Sinhala films — Mathalang, Ahankara Istree — and was the pioneer of Sinhala cinema.
- K. Gunaratnam was one of the most successful producers of early Sri Lankan cinema. With the influential Sujatha, Gunaratnam brought his Cinemas Ltd. company into original productions in 1953. Previously he had dubbed several Indian films into Sinhala. Over the span of the decade, Gunaratnam had hit after hit with such works as Warada Kageda?, Radala Piliruwa and Saradam. In the 1960s, he produced some sophisticated art films like Sandeshaya and Deewarayo which broke away from imitation of Indian cinema.
- M. S. Anandan gained accolades with his camera work for Sri Lankan films like Golu Hadawatha and Nidhanaya. As a director he produced sophisticated commercial movies that were popular in their time.
- T. Somesekeran directed and produced the Sinhala movie Seda Sulang, one of the most popular Sri Lankan films of the 1950s. It helped secure the star status of Sinhala actors Prem Jayanth and Florida Jayalath.
- Robin Tampoe was one of the most prolific early Sri Lankan directors, handling the reins on such works as Sudo Sudu (1965). He worked in genres including village folk drama, comedy and romance. Tampoe produced all of his films and had his own studio, R. T.
- W. M. S. Tampoe directed several films including the popular 1963 Samiya Birindage Deviya. He is the father of Robin Tampoe.
- K. Venkat directed several Sinhala films in the 1960s and 1970s such as Siripathula (1978). He was burned alive in his car during 1983 riots.
- Thangarajah Arjuna was a graduate of the London School of Film Technique and a presidential award-winning filmmaker in Sri Lanka. His film Wasanthaye Davask still holds the record for the maximum number of presidential awards given for a single feature film.
- D. M. Das (Mariyadasan) directed Sinhala films in the 1960s and 1970s."Amathaka Wnada?" (1967),"Hari Maga" (1969),"Ran Wan Rekha" (1975), "Honda Hitha" (1977), "Rangaa" (1981).
- M. Rameshwaram produced "Sorungeth Soru" (1967), "Thevatha" (1970), "Aparadhaya Saha Danduwama" (1973).
- M. V. Balan also an actor (Comedy), who directed "Oba Nethi Nam" (1969),"Mage Ran Putha" (1978),"Rahasak Nethi Rahasak" (1982).
- Premnath Moraes, J. Selvaratnam, J. Rasaratnam, V. Sivadasan, S. Thevendran, E. Rutnam, S. V. Chandran and several others directed films.

== Music directors and singers ==
- M. K. Rocksamy (1932–1988) was a prolific Sri Lankan musician and music director. He became involved in film work after coming in contact with R. Muttusamy (1928–1988) of the Sundera Murugan Studio in Kandana. Rocksamy was asked to contribute to the soundtrack of several films made at the studio beginning with Bandara Nagarayata Pemineema (1952). In 1962, he got the opportunity to play a bigger role directing three songs for Shanthi Kumar's Sansare after its original music director B. S. Perera died.
- A. E. Manoharan (1944–2018) was a Jaffna Tamil baila singer popular in Sri Lanka during the 1970s. A star of many Sri Lankan Tamil films, his only appearance in Sinhala cinema was in Titus Thotawatte's Maruwa Samage Wase in a baila medley scene that included his hit "Surangani".

== Actors and actresses ==
- Rukmani Devi was the first star of Sri Lankan cinema with her performance in the 1947 Kadawunu Poronduwa. Through the 1950s and 1960s, she remained highly popular, starring in many successful films. She is the only Sri Lankan actress to sing her own songs. She is of Colombo Chetty origin.
- Shyama Anandan was the star of several of her father M. S. Anandan's productions (i.e. Chandi Shyama) that highlighted the exploits of her rebellious teenager character. She also had a supporting role in the art film Gehenu Lamai which gained her critical praise.
- Asoka Ponnamperuma was a hefty actor who starred in several films during the 1960s. He directed a film later.
- Darshan Dharmaraj was a Tamil actor who worked in Sinhala cinema. He was awarded several times for Best Actor in films like Matha and Ini Avan.
- Other Tamils acted in Sinhala cinema include Raja Ganeshan, Niranjani Shanmugaraja, Gajan Kanesshan, Priyankan, Subhashini Balasubramaniam and Yasodha Radhakrishnan.

== See also ==
- Sri Lankan Tamils in Indian cinema
