= Praana (2022 film) =

2022 Sri Lankan film

- Seeds (ප්‍රාණ)2022 poster
- Sinhala: ප‍්‍රාණ
- Directed by: Sanjaya Nirmal
- Written by: Sanjaya Nirmal
- Based on: Real events
- Produced by: Janaka Perera
- Starring: Shyam Fernando; Niranjani Shanmugaraja; Darshan Dharmaraj
- Cinematography: Striner Adams
- Edited by: Shan Alwis
- Music by: Nadeeka Guruge
- Release date: October 7, 2022
- Country: Sri Lanka
- Languages: Sinhala, Tamil, English

Praana (Seeds) (Sinhala: ප‍්‍රාණ, Tamil: வித்துக்கள்) is a 2022 Sri Lankan trilingual drama film directed by Sanjaya Nirmal and produced by Janaka Perera. The film stars Shyam Fernando, Niranjani Shanmugaraja, Darshan Dharmaraj in lead roles, whereas Nita Fernando and King Ratnam made supportive roles. The film is based on the true story of the Great Catholic Christian Massacre of nearly 700 Christians that took place in 1544 in Mannar and the chain of events related to the same massacre that took place in 1560.

The film will be the first film to be released in Sinhala, English and Tamil languages at the same period in Sri Lanka.

== Plot ==
In the midst of a turbulent war, Father Melchior, a devoted Franciscan missionary priest, embarks on a perilous journey to Ceylon (now called Sri Lanka) alongside the Portuguese army in 1560. Driven by a dual purpose, they seek retribution for the massacre of Christians in Mannar while spreading the "true religion of light." Little does Father Melchior know, his path will soon intertwine with two opposing forces: the greedy and conspiring Portuguese imperialists and King Cankili I of Jaffna, who ruthlessly defends his sovereign state from Portuguese invasion.

As Father Melchior navigates the treacherous landscape, his unwavering commitment to his faith is tested repeatedly. He confronts formidable challenges, including his eventual capture and brutal punishment at the hands of King Cankili. In the midst of despair, he bears witness to the tragic deaths of innocent people who share his unwavering devotion. It is during these darkest moments that Father Melchior discovers solace and inspiration within the pages of Father Lisano's diary—a courageous priest who, like him, faced persecution and death for standing up for his beliefs.

The diary becomes a beacon of hope for Father Melchior, illuminating a path forward. Fueled by the legacy of Father Lisano, he finds the strength to persevere, understanding that truth cannot be silenced by political power or overshadowed by darkness. With renewed determination, he becomes a symbol of unwavering conviction, igniting hope in the hearts of those who have lost their way.

== Cast ==
- Shyam Fernando as Catholic priest
- Darshan Dharmaraj as Cankili king
- Niranjani Shanmugaraja as Cankili queen
- Nita Fernando as nun Dona Maria (adult)
- King Ratnam as King's royal minister
- Tray Hicks as Dom Constantino
- Steven Mark Lordsic as Father Melkio
- Robert Siera as John
- Peter Satternitez as The Bishop
- Kalpa Munasinghe
- Wageesha Salgado as Dona Maria (young)
- Dinesh De Silva as Jesus
- Kapila Galappatti
- Chandra Hassan as Bahuarachchi
- Senesh Dissanayake Bandara as Portuguese soldier
- Pahandi Tharaka as King's daughter (child)
- Mohan Sharma as main villager in 1544
- G. A. Shahib as King's daughter (older)
- Vidura Lakthilaka as Antonia de Schvodus
- Suranga Ranawaka as Interpreter
- Sahayan Seneviratne as Dominion regional leader
- John Bosco as Apprentice of Father Lisano
- Michael Collin as Apprentice of Father Lisano

== Production ==
The film marked the sixth cinema direction by Sanjaya Nirmal, after the films: Samaara, Rosa Kale, July Hathai, Swara and Aale Corona. The film was edited by Shaan Alwis, music direction by Nadeeka Guruge and the production coordination is done by Fr Antony Nishan and Ranjan Prasanna. Dhammika Hewaduwatta is the art director and Buwaneka Ranawaka is the costume designer, Priyantha Samarakoon is the assistant director. Striner Adams worked as the cinematographer and Gayan Kosala is the production manager. Shashin Gimhan Perera is in charge of the sound effects whereas Suneth Malinga Lokuhewa is the production manager. The social media launch of the film was held in January 2022 at Thottaweli, Mannar at the burial site where those 700 Christian murdered by Tamil Cankili king.
