= Tsunami (2020 film) =

2020 Sri Lankan drama film

- official poster
- Sinhala: සුනාමි
- Directed by: Somaratne Dissanayake
- Written by: Somaratne Dissanayake
- Based on: 2004 Tsunami Disaster
- Produced by: Cine Films Lanka
- Starring: Niranjani Shanmugaraja; Darshan Dharmaraj; Himali Sayurangi; Bimal Jayakody
- Cinematography: Vishwa Balasooriya
- Music by: Rohana Weerasinghe
- Distributed by: Savoy Cinemas
- Release date: 16 January 2020
- Country: Sri Lanka
- Language: Sinhala

Tsunami (Sinhala: සුනාමි) is a 2020 Sri Lankan Sinhala disaster drama film directed by Somaratne Dissanayake and produced by his wife Renuka Balasooriya for Cine Films Lanka. It stars Niranjani Shanmugaraja and Darshan Dharmaraj in lead roles along with Himali Sayurangi and Bimal Jayakody. Music composed by Rohana Weerasinghe. The film is based on incidents occurred in Sri Lanka during 2004 Indian Ocean earthquake and tsunami on 26 December 2004.

The screening halted due to COVID-19 pandemic in Sri Lanka. In October 2020, the film has qualified to represent the competition section of the Byelsa International Film Festival in Yonago, Nigeria, in which later won the Best Actress Award as well as Best Director Award. Dissanayake won the Best Director award at the Moonwhite Films International Film Fest in the Feature Film International category at the Moonwhite Films International Film Fest held on 8 December 2020 in India. In addition, the film was nominated for Best International Film.

== Plot ==
The film is based on a true story about a war of love for a mother and a devoted mother who lost a child in the tsunami.

== Cast ==
- Niranjani Shanmugaraja as Kuchchaveli Kalyani
- Darshan Dharmaraj as Selvam
- Menara Weeratunga as Prabha / Shashi
- Himali Sayurangi as Sriyani
- Bimal Jayakody as Kapila
- Giriraj Kaushalya as Kapila's Lawyer
- Anuruddhika Padukkage as Varuni
- Chinthaka Kulatunga as Gayan, Varuni's husband
- Kumara Thirimadura as Gurunnanse
- Sarath Chandrasiri as Kapu mahaththya
- Lalith Janakantha as Buddhist monk
- Sampath Tennakoon as Principal of Sinhala city school
- Gihan Fernando as a Politician
- Rathna Lalani Jayakody as Principal of Sinhala Central College
- Wishwajith Gunasekara as Psychiatrist Lionel Wijeratne
- Ranjani Rajmohan as Principal of Tamil school
- J. Yogaraja as Selvam's Lawyer
- Jayantha Muthuthanthri as Fortune teller
- Suneth Shanthapriya as Journalist
- Saman Almeida as Court clerk

== Production and release ==
The film was shot over a period of 50 days. The tsunami wave was created in an abandoned shrimp box at Molagoda, Negombo. It was Ranmihithenna which was used built the scene where the bus was toppled. The big coconut palm trees and palm trees were transported to the scenery.

The film was initially planned to be released in August 2019 in 75 theaters islandwide by Ben Holdings’ Savoy Cinemas (formerly EAP Films and Theaters).

In November, the film was premiered in nine theaters with state-of-the-art equipment, which were opened recently at Galle face Shopping complex in Colombo one. The film was initially planned to screen on 26 December 2019, it was delayed to the screening of Rush and Vishama Bhaga. The film was officially premiered at Savoy Premier Theater, Wellawatte on 16 January 2020. It is the first Dolby Atmos film in Sri Lanka.

== Soundtrack ==
The film consists with two songs.

No.	Title	Singer(s)	Length
1.	"Kawuda Mama"	Hiruni Nimeshika
2.	"Budu Ranjidune"	Harshana Dissanayake
