= Bibiladeniye Mahanama =

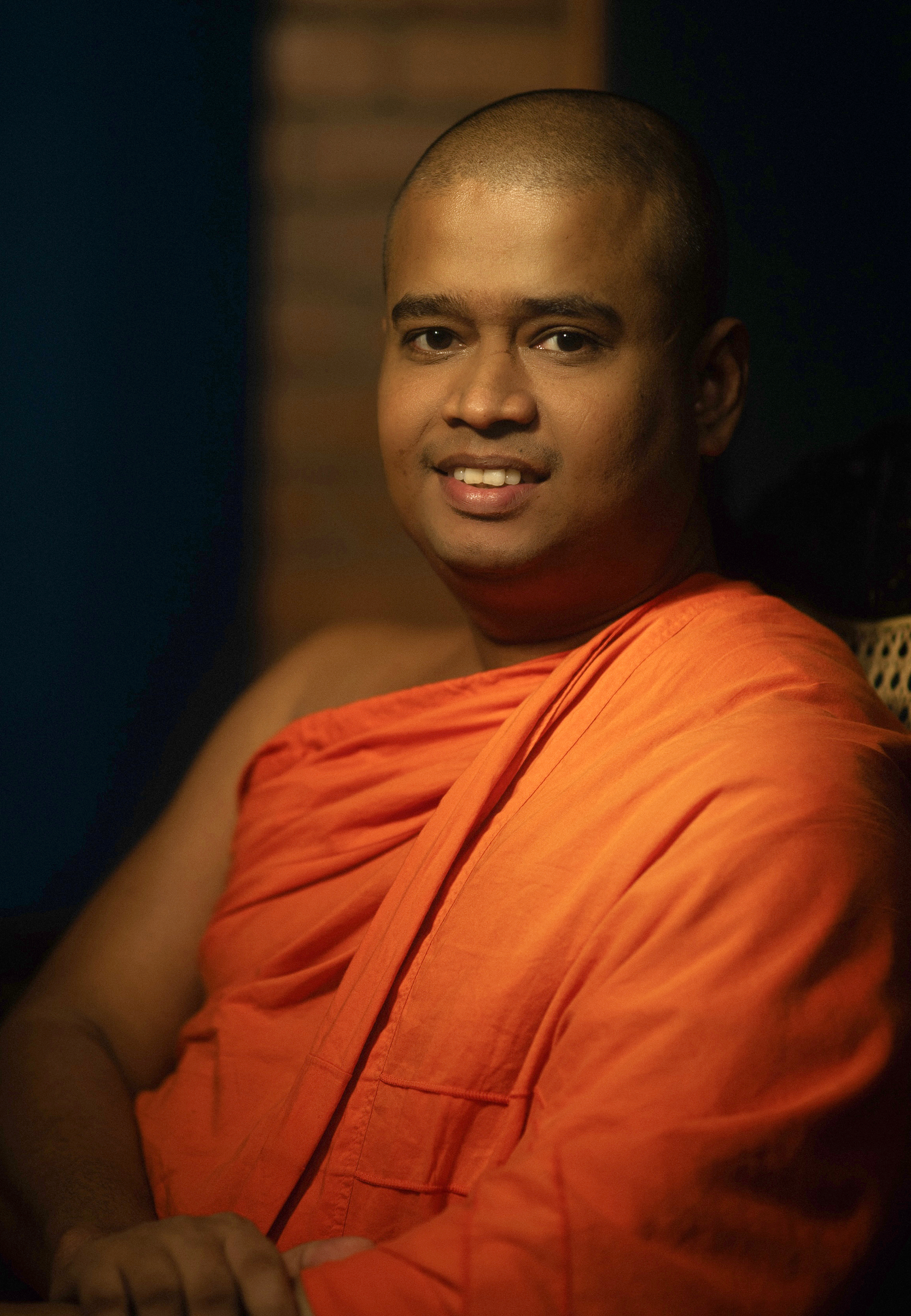

Background information
- Born: 31 October 1989 (age 36); Dompe, Gampaha, Sri Lanka
- Genres: Film scores, classical, Buddhist music, religious music, pop music, relaxation music, spiritual music
- Occupations: Composer, music arranger, music producer, music director, Buddhist monk
- Years active: 2005 – present
- Labels: Sandhara, Music Monastery, AirXone Musik
- Website: bibiladeniyemahanama.com

Bibiladeniye Mahanama Thera is a Buddhist monk of the Theravada Order. The Thera is the only Buddhist monk in Asia of the Theravada school to engage in the experimentation and the creative exploration of music as a form of aesthetic expression. The Thera has been engaged with the art, both on overseas projects as well as in Sri Lanka for nearly two decades.

Share the Love, the album released in 2014, is his very first experimental attempt on Spirituality and Relaxation. The album was released in Europe, Asia and Sri Lanka. In 2015 the album was awarded the prestigious State Music Award for the best album produced in Sri Lanka.

In 2017, the venerable entered the world of cinema with the musical direction debut on the film Girivassipura directed by Devinda Konhahage. It is recorded that this is the first ever time a Buddhist monk achieved such a milestone. Since then, he has worked on many films, documentaries, theme songs and musical pieces.

The Thera is also recognised as the pioneer who introduced Conceptual Musical Short Films to Sri Lanka. In 2019, he started work on the first Conceptual Musical Short Film – Wallstory. It was released on the digital stream in 2020. This was a milestone for the Sri Lankan cinema music industry. On the 21st of September, 2021 on World Peace Day, he released the second conceptual musical short film – Piece for Peace, to celebrate peace and inter-religious harmony.

The Thera’s contribution to society is not limited to only music, cinema, Buddhist philosophy and spiritual harmony. The creative contribution too is immense. The most notable being the restoration of the research based “Jathaka” Stories Recitals project in 2015–16. The “Jathaka Katha” (Jathaka Stories) is one of the most important works of literature in the Theravada Buddhism. With the participation of over 150 Buddhist monks, the Jathaka Stories were recorded in the traditional Jathaka Stories recital form. The project was envisioned as a means of preserving the traditional recital of Jathaka Stories in its original style, for posterity. The restoration work is a 500 plus hour voice recording project that was overlooked by Venerable Bibiladeniye Mahanama Thera.

Venerable Bibiladeniye Mahanama Thera is also the music director from the Sri Lankan end, on the Television drama series “You Are Always with Me”, jointly produced by the People’s Republic of China and the Democratic Socialist Republic of Sri Lanka. It is the first television drama series co-produced between Sri Lanka and China and was directed by Cui Yali.

Even at this young age, he holds various positions in global associations working that work on environmental and animal welfare, as well as multi-religious and welfare organisations. The Thera is also the founder of the Share the Love Foundation of Ceylon and Sandhara Spiritual Buddhist Aesthetics and Arts Centre.

== Early life and education ==
Bibiladeniye Mahanama was born on 31 October 1989 at the government hospital in Dompe. His birth name, Wanaviraja Wasala Mudhiyanselage Lahiru Madhusanka, was given to him by his mother, Indrani Tennakoon, and father, Wanaviraja Wasala Mudhiyanselage Abeyratne Bandara. He is the eldest of their three children. Lahiru had his primary education at Jayanthi Central College in Nikaweratiya. He was ordained a Buddhist monk on 27 July 1999 and given his present name Bibiladeniye Mahanama. He is a student of Wahantare Siddhartha Thera at Sri Shailathalaramaya – Panduwasnuwara. His initial Pirivena education was at the Paramadhamma Cheitiya Pirivena in Ratmalana since 1999, and continued his higher studies at the Sri Pandukabhya Pirivena in Panduwasnuwara. His Advanced level education was at the Kurunegala Baudhaloka Vidyawarthana Pirivena under the guidance of Wahantare Siddhartha Thera.

He was awarded a scholarship to study computer science and music at the Kobeigana-Crasda Computer Institute, where he later worked as lecturer for two years from the age of 17. With the encouragement of Wahanthare Siddhartha Thera, he studied North Indian music styles and guitar technique under the musician Danister Perera. Bibiladeniye Mahanama was awarded a full scholarship by musician Dilup Gabadamudalige to study at his institute for computerised music and sound engineering in Pelawatte for two years – 2007–2009. He also studied the basics of North Indian vocal styles under the musician and professor, Dayaratne Ranatunge and Usthad Gulam Nihaz Khan in Mumbai.

== Music career ==
Bibiladeniye Mahanama went on to work with professional musicians in Sri Lanka and internationally as a composer, director, music arranger, and recording artist.

=== Music arrangement and composition ===
- Thimiraya, short film directed by Vidarshana Rathnayake – 2008
- Marayage Maga, short film directed by Isuru Sandakelum – 2008
- Paligenima, short film directed by Vidarshana Rathnayake – 2008
- Akashadeepa, television film with Karthik Sharma (India), directed by Sakkarebailu Srinivas – 2012
- Sheela & Marius, animated film based on the children's book by Predi Vukovi (Switzerland) – 2012
- Solo Buddhist Song Project, produced by University of Visual and Performing art – Colombo – 2013
- Documentary Film, produced by Sri Lankan General Hospital Service – 2015
- Theme Music, produced by Sri Lankan Lawyers Association's Social Awareness – 2016
- Sasara Wassanaya – Derana TV, produced by Devinda Koongahage – 2016
- Girivassipura, directed by Devinda Koongahage
- The Hospital Service, documentary film – Colombo Hospital Service – 2017
- Vajirarama Dhamma School, Documentary Film for Celebrating Century – 2018
- Adithya Ayurvedic Hospital Profile, documentary film – 2019
- You are always with Me, China – Sri Lanka Collaboration Television Film – 2019
- Mahinda Madihaheva Profile, documentary film – 2019
- Ramesh Pathirana Profile, documentary film – 2020
- Chandu, Sri Lankan Election Commission Campaign – 2020
- Sri Lanka Signal Crops, Sri Lankan Army Signal Crops Documentary – 2020
- Climate Change Secretariat Sri Lanka – TVC Series with Ruwan Costa – 2020
- Gandhara – Buddhist Heritage of Pakistan, documentary film produced by High Commission of Pakistan in Sri Lanka – 2021

=== Music and background recordings ===
- Karuna Nadee, Buddhist oratorio by Dinesh Subasinghe – 2010
- Sundarai Premaya, television drama directed by Chandrathna Mapitigama, with music direction by Dinesh Subasinghe – 2007–2009
- Hitata Wahal Vimi, television drama directed by Mohan Niyaz with music direction by Dinesh Subasinghe
- Sihina Wasanthaya, television drama (final episode) directed by Sunil Costa, Sanjaya Nirmal, and Saranga Mendis with music direction by Dinesh Subasinghe
- Me Uyanata Mal Genna film directed by Chandrathna Mapitigama with music direction by Dinesh Subasinghe – 2009–2010
- Hiru Dutu Malak, film directed by Cleatus Mendis with music direction by Dinesh Subasinghe – 2011
- Surangana Lovin Evilla, film directed by Suneth Malinga Lokuhewa with music direction by Dinesh Subasinghe – 2011–2012
- Siwamma Dhanapala, stage play by Tennyson Cooray with music direction by Dinesh Subasinghe – 2012
- Kaviya, An Educational Poem Collection with Ranjith Premaweera – 2016
- Dhamma School Theme Song, Reproduction by Sirsa TV with Ranjith Premaweera – 2016
- Jathaka GATHA – PEO TV Poem – 2018
- Kurulu Geesara, An Educational Song Collection with Chamra Ruwanthilaka – 2019

=== Mindfulness Initiatives ===
Venerable Bibiladeniye Mahanama Thera has made significant contributions to the development of several mindfulness mobile applications, bringing his creative ideas and musical expertise to projects such as MindSupply and Aayuu. Among these, Heal-Lift stands out as a landmark initiative in which he actively engaged and provided consultation.

Heal-Lift holds the distinction of being Sri Lanka's first-ever relaxation and mindfulness mobile application. It was developed under the visionary guidance of Venerable Bibiladeniye Mahanama Thera to address stress, anxiety, and related conditions. The application emphasises mind tranquility through features such as relaxing meditation, guided meditation, and mindfulness practices.

In its initial phase, Heal-Lift showcases over 100 original musical compositions for mindfulness, all meticulously crafted by Venerable Bibiladeniye Mahanama Thera. This groundbreaking project was initiated by Zincat Pvt Ltd.

=== Albums ===
- Premaye Namen, with Charith Priyadhammika – 2007
- Sudu Piyumak Se, children's song album, with Lahiru Chamalka – 2008
- Sansara Sangramaye, collection of Buddhist songs performed by Sri Lankan singers, with Dinesh Subasinghe
- Kampitha Sewaneli, collection of songs by Jayasena Kottegoda performed by Sri Lankan singers
- Share the Love, relaxation music album – 2014
- Breath of Life – upcoming

=== Awards ===
- "State Music Awards – 2015" for Best Album for Share the Love

=== Other ===
- Sri Lanka National Drugs Prevention and Operation Unit Theme
- Sri Lanka Environmental Ministry Theme (2009)
- Bo Sevana Pre-School Theme, Bo Sevana Foundation
- "Rima Rima", theme for Yanni's holiday celebration by Street Team 2010, with Dinesh Subasinghe
- "Independence" theme song on Sirasa Superstar Generation Four, with Nimantha Heshan
- Pansiya Panas Jathaka Poth Wahanse, audio version of 548 stories
- "Buddhist Chanting Sutras" with Omalpe Sobhitha Thera – 2015
