= Alborada (film) =

2021 Sri Lankan film

- Sinhala: ඇල්බොරාදා
- Directed by: Asoka Handagama
- Written by: Asoka Handagama
- Based on: Sex life of Pablo Neruda in Sri Lanka
- Produced by: H.D. Premasiri
- Starring: Luis Romero; Anne Solen; Dominic Keller; Nimaya Harris
- Cinematography: Channa Deshapriya
- Edited by: Ravindra Guruge
- Music by: Ajith Kumarasiri; Namini Panchala
- Release dates: November 3, 2021 (Tokyo International Film Festival); February 14, 2022 (Sri Lanka)
- Running time: 108 minutes
- Country: Sri Lanka
- Languages: English; Spanish; Sinhala; Tamil
- Budget: $350,000 (estd.)

Alborada (Sinhala: ඇල්බොරාදා) is a 2021 Sri Lankan multilingual biographical romantic film directed by Asoka Handagama and produced by H.D. Premasiri for Sarasavi Cineroo. The film is based on the fictionalized sex life of Chile's Nobel Laureate Pablo Neruda from 1929 to 1931 in Sri Lanka. It stars Luis J. Romero and Anne Solen Hatte in the lead roles, alongside Dominic Keller, Malcolm Machado and Rithika Kodithuwakku in supporting roles. The Spanish meaning of 'Alborada' is "the dawning of the day".

== Cast ==
- Luis J. Romero as Pablo Neruda
- Anne Solen Hatte as Josie Bliss, Neruda's Burmese girlfriend
- Dominic Kellar as Lionel Wendt
- Nimaya Harris as Patsy, Neruda's liberated girlfriend
- Malcolm Machado as Servant Ratnaiya
- Rithika Kodithuwakku as the Tamil garbage cleaner woman
- Thusitha Laknath
- Samantha Balasuriya
- Juliyan Kawshalya Mendis
- Krishantha Jayabahu
- Adam Smyth
- Lewis Bower
- Conrad Ford
- Rebecca Russell-Turner
- Kasun Perera
- Kanchana Nandani

== Production ==
The earliest information on Pablo Neruda's presence as Chilean Consul of Sri Lanka and the experiences he encountered in Sri Lanka was first found by Handagama in Tissa Abeysekera's book "Ayaale Giya Sithak". It was in those days that the idea of making a film based on that incident came to his mind. Even though he started to write the script with a romance-based plot, he later realized that Neruda has raped a Tamil garbage collecting female lady during his visit to Sri Lanka.

Meanwhile, women's and student movements are protesting against a proposal in parliament to rename Chile's main airport, Santiago, as Pablo Neruda Airport in 2018. Due to the strength of the opposition, the government had to withdraw the resolution. The script was fully prepared throughout 2019 and it was decided to shoot in 2020 amidst COVID-19 pandemic. The casting of the film was too difficult with searching fresh faces that can speak Spanish and foreign look. Although a Chilean actor was first screened, his dates did not match with COVID situation. Handagama then screened Luis Romero, a young Spanish actor and poet who knew Neruda well and loved him. Then he chose Anne Solen, a French actress of Asian descent, for the role of Neruda's Burmese girlfriend. Filming commenced after the end of the first COVID-19 curfew..

Sri Lankan artists of foreign origin were selected for the supporting roles. The role of Lionel Wendt is played by Dominic Keller. Nimaya Harris as Neruda's liberated girlfriend. Malcolm Machado plays the servant and Rithika Kodithuwakku plays as the Tamil garbage cleaner. The main language of the film is English but also had to use Spanish when reciting poetry because the flow of words with syllables comes exactly from the original language of Neruda. Tamil and Sinhala languages were used when necessary as well as subtitled.

The production plan of the film was done by Nimal Dushmantha. Then he built Ranminithenna cinema village as a model of the old Colombo Fort. Nonagama was selected as the scene of the Sakkili community singing.

== Release ==
The media screening was held at the PVR Cinema Hall under the patronage of the Minister of Mass Media and Information, Dullas Alahapperuma. A special screening of the film was held on 29 December 2021 at the Multiplex Cinema Hall in Kandy City Center.

The film and Neruda's memoir translated by Saman Wickramaarachchi was officially released under the title 'Mata Mathaka Ma' on 14 February 2022. However, the film was released for a limited number of days where the show is set to end on March 3.

== Recognition ==
The film received mostly positive reviews from critics. The film competed in the International Competition Section at the 34th Tokyo International Film Festival (2021) in Japan and the 10th Asian Film Festival Barcelona in Spain.
