= Girivassipura =

2018 Sri Lankan historical drama film

- Directed by: Devinda Kongahage
- Written by: Devinda Kongahage
- Based on: real life story of Sri Vikrama Rajasinha of Kandy Kingdom
- Produced by: Shirantha Amarasinghe; Daminda Upali Fernando
- Starring: Pubudu Chathuranga; Niranjani Shanmugaraja; Buddika Lokukatiya; Mahendra Perera; Elroy Amalathas; Amiththa Weerasinghe; Daya Tennekoon; Roshan Pilapitiya
- Cinematography: Suresh Dhammika
- Edited by: Pravin Jayaratne
- Music by: Bibiladeniye Mahanama Thero
- Production company: Best Life Cinema
- Release date: 13 October 2018
- Country: Sri Lanka
- Language: Sinhala

Girivassipura (transl. Hill City dwellers) is a 2018 Sri Lankan Sinhala-language historical drama film written and directed by Devinda Kongahage. The film stars Pubudu Chathuranga and Niranjani Shanmugaraja in the main lead roles while Mahendra Perera, Amiththa Weerasinghe and Buddika Lokukatiya play pivotal roles.

== Production ==
The film is based on the real-life story of the former Sri Lankan king, Sri Vikrama Rajasinha of Kandy who was also the last domestic ruler (king) to have ruled the Kingdom of Kandy before the ruling of British authorities. The film was made with a whopping budget of 13 Crores as the film went onto become one of the most expensive Sinhala film as well as Sri Lankan film ever to be made in the history of Cinema of Sri Lanka. The film roped in Bibiladeniye Mahanama Thero as music composer for the film which in fact was the first instance where a Buddhist monk was roped in to score music for the film. The lyrics for the songs were penned by Pottuvil Asmin and this film also became the first Sinhala film to feature a Tamil song.

The film had its theatrical release on 13 October 2018 with English and Tamil subtitles clashing alongside biographical film Nidahase Piya DS at the box office.

The portions of the film were shot in Colombo, Kandy and Hingurangketha with the shooting of the film went on floors from late 2017. The film is produced by Best Life Cinema which is also their second production in Sinhala film industry.

== Cast ==
- Pubudu Chathuranga as Sri Vikrama Rajasinha
- Niranjani Shanmugaraja as Queen Ranganayaki
- Mahendra Perera as Pilimathalawa
- Buddika Lokukatiya
- Amiththa Weerasinghe
- Daya Thennakoon
- Nayanthara Wickramarachchi
- Kingsly Lose
- Somaweera Gamage
- Roshan Pilapitiya
- Elroy Amalathas
- Wilmon Sirimanne
- Dayasiri Hettiarachchi
- Kumudu Nishantha
- Malendra Weeraratne
- Pavithra Wickramasinghe
- Lakshan Waththuhewa
- Richard Mundy

== Synopsis ==
The Senkadagala tragedy which is referred as the humiliation caused to King Sri Vikrama Rajasinha by the Kandy people due to the ignition of British authorities. The plot of the film depicts the actual qualities and life story of the King and the consequences that he face due to his change in behaviours due to the mastermind plans of the British authorities whose concern was to capture the country.

== See also ==
- List of Sri Lankan films of the 2010s
