= Soppana Sundhari =

2023 film by Mathavan Maheswaran

- Film poster
- Directed by: Mathavan Maheswaran
- Written by: Joel Chriz
- Screenplay by: Joel Chriz
- Story by: Joel Chriz
- Starring: Joel Chiz; Niranjani Shanmugaraja; Varun Thushyanthan; Naresh Nagendran
- Cinematography: Chamal H Wickramasinghe
- Edited by: Mathavan Maheswaran
- Music by: Jeevanandhan Ram
- Production company: Studio MP3 Production
- Release date: 26 August 2023
- Running time: 150 minutes
- Country: Sri Lanka
- Language: Tamil

Soppana Sundhari is a 2023 Sri Lankan Tamil language comedy thriller film directed by Mathavan Maheswaran in his feature film directorial debut. The story and screenplay for the film were written by Joel Chriz who happened to be long time friend of Mathavan Maheswaran. The film stars Joel Chriz, Kajanan, Naresh, Niranjani Shanmugaraja in the main lead roles. Niranjani Shanmugara plays the titular role of Sundari in the film. The film tackles the crucial critical topic of drug trafficking in Sri Lanka.

== Synopsis ==
Three close friends Baby, Jerry and Power (Kajanan Kailainathan, Joel Chriz and Naresh Nagendran) form great bond with each other and share all the happiness and sorrow. They make a living out of engaging in silly ways of stealing from people by intentionally disconnecting power supply in the houses and one of the guys in the gang Power (Naresh Nagendran) pretend as the electrician who comes to rectify the power supply issue upon the request of the affected people. Things go fine until one of the guys Baby (Kajanan Kailainathan) who drives a three-wheel fall in love with a school teacher Sundari (Niranjani Shanmugaraja) and the girl rejects the offer and insists him that she will only consider him as boyfriend the moment he lets go off his three-wheeler and starts learning English and also by engaging in a job which pays well over Rs. 50,000. The guy goes to any levels to get the validation of the girl and he even argues with his two other friends. He goes in search of greed and money and he even makes use of his two close mates for the mission. Things go terribly wrong when the three guys attempt to rake in 50,000 from a rich lady Antika (Perllijah) by kidnapping her favourite pet dog by engaging in usual theft ploy. The twist happens when those guys request the lady to come to Fort Railway Station to give the money in order to get back the dog.

Meanwhile, NCB unit of police has been into a mission impossible mode by implementing a secret mission which is led by a brave police officer, Saro (Varun Thushyanthan), who leads the charge to collect information regarding the drugs network. The three guys Baby, Jerry and Power end up accidentally getting into the drug mafia of Dev (Mathavan Maheswaran) when they actually went to Fort Railway Station to obtain the money amounting to 50,000 from Antika in exchange of her beloved dog. However, it was Dev's masterplan to cause the confusion in the railway station by including drugs in a bag which Baby, Jerry and Power mistakenly considered as the bag with the money.

== Cast ==
- Niranjani Shanmugaraja as Sundari, a school teacher who also plays the love interest of Baby
- Joel Chriz as Jerry
- Varun Thushyanthan as Saro, police officer
- Kajanan Kailainathan as Baby
- Perllijah as Antika, a filthy rich woman
- Naresh Nagendran as Power
- Gk Reginold Eroshon as Maligawatta Gang
- Hamesh Maheshwaran
- Mathavan Maheswaran as Dev
- Darshan Dharmaraj

== Production ==
Principal photography of the film began in 2017 and the portions of the film were predominantly shot and set in across Colombo. Mathavan Maheswaran made his fully-fledged feature film debut through this project. Prior to his full-length film debut, he had directed several short films in his career.

The film was shot in Wellawatte, Maradana, Fort railway station. The post-production of the film delayed for years due to budget issues. The film was stalled for sometime as filmmakers were awaiting for the funding by independent producers but later filmmakers realised that there is lack of interest among producers. Filmmakers Mathavan Maheswaran, Kajanan and Joel who were also long time friends decided to invest their own money to produce the film.
