= Orey Naalil =

- Directed by: ARM Razim
- Produced by: Ashraf Ali
- Starring: Gajen
- Cinematography: M. A. Gafoor; S. Bala
- Music by: Sudarshan
- Release date: 30 September 2011
- Country: Sri Lanka
- Language: Tamil

Orey Naalil (transl. In a Single Day) is a 2011 Sri Lankan Tamil-language drama film directed by ARM Razim, produced by Colombo businessman Ashraf Ali, and starring Gajen. The film is the 29th Tamil film to be made and released in Sri Lanka.

== Plot ==
The film is about how two brothers become enemies.

== Cast ==
- Gajen
- Umes
- ARM Razim

== Production ==
This is the first Sri Lankan Tamil film in eighteen years to be fully shot with a local cast and crew. The film's shooting started in 2007 in Colombo during the Sri Lankan civil war.

== Release and reception ==
The film premiered at the National Film Corporation of Sri Lanka's cinema hall. Reviewing the film at the premiere, a critic from Thinakaran wrote that it is a must-watch for anyone with a sense of patriotism. Despite the delay in making the film, it was released at the Cine City Maradana Theatre in Colombo due to help from the National Film Corporation. However, it removed after its first day from Cine City Maradana Theatre, Colombo to accommodate for the Indian film Vedi. The film also faced a poorer box office performance in Jaffna and Batticaloa due to the Indian film. The film was a box office bomb.
