= Prabhakaran (film) =

Prabhakaran ප්‍රභාකරන්
- Directed by: Thushara Peiris
- Written by: Thushara Peiris
- Produced by: Osmond de Silva
- Starring: Priyankara Rathnayake; Anuruddhika Padukkage; Dasun Madhusanka
- Cinematography: Jayanath Gunawardana
- Edited by: Praveen Jayaratne
- Music by: Mahesh Denipitiya
- Production company: Cine Chiththa Institute
- Distributed by: CEL Theaters
- Release date: 25 April 2008
- Country: Sri Lanka
- Language: Sinhala

Prabhakaran (Sinhala: ප්‍රභාකරන්) is a 2008 Sri Lankan biographical war film directed by Thushara Peiris and produced by Osmond de Silva. It stars Priyankara Rathnayake, Anuruddhika Padukkage and Dasun Madhusanka in lead roles along with Darshan Dharmaraj and Sarath Dikkumbura. Music composed by Mahesh Denipitiya. It is the 1104th film in Sri Lankan cinema. The film gained notoriety after Peiris was attacked by a mob in Chennai, India during a visit to work on the film's dubbed Tamil version. The attack was a result of an opposition towards the film by Liberation Tigers of Tamil Eelam (LTTE) supporters in the midst of ongoing protests against the Sri Lankan Civil War.

The film screened successfully in Rome and 25 theaters around Europe and earned 18,000 Euros.

== Plot ==
The film revolves around the life and incidents of an LTTE cadre and his brother in the Wanni.

== Cast ==
- Priyankara Rathnayake as Piyasoma
- Anuruddhika Padukkage as Kamalini
- Dasun Madhusanka as Kamalini's brother
- Sarath Dikkumbura
- Darshan Dharmaraj
- Chamila Gamage
- Kumara Ranapura
- Aishara Athukorala
- Hashinika Karaliyadda
- Kamal Siriwardana
- Harsha Udakanda
