= Thani Thatuwen Piyabanna =

Thani Thatuwen Piyabanna තනි තටුවෙන් පියාඹන්න
- Theatrical release poster
- Directed by: Asoka Handagama
- Written by: Asoka Handagama
- Produced by: Upul Shantha Sannasgala
- Starring: Anoma Janadari; W. Jayasiri; Mahendra Perera
- Cinematography: Channa Deshapriya
- Edited by: Ravindra Guruge
- Music by: Rohana Weerasinghe
- Production company: Be-Positive Media Group
- Distributed by: Sanhinda Films
- Release date: 26 February 2003
- Running time: 81 minutes
- Country: Sri Lanka
- Language: Sinhala

Thani Thatuwen Piyabanna (Flying with one Wing) (Sinhala: තනි තටුවෙන් පියාඹන්න) is a 2003 Sri Lankan Sinhala drama erotic film directed by Asoka Handagama and maiden cinema production by Upul Shantha Sannasgala. It stars Anoma Janadari and Gayani Gisanthika in lead roles along with Mahendra Perera and W. Jayasiri. Music composed by Rohana Weerasinghe. It is the 1003rd Sri Lankan film in the Sinhala cinema.

The film won many awards at international film festivals, although it was criticized in Sri Lanka due to many scenes of tobacco smoking women. The film was regarded as the most revolutionary South Asian film at the London International Film Festival in 2002. The jury of 20th Torino International Film Festival held in Italy decided to assign a special mention to actress Anoma Janadari for her role in the movie.

== Plot ==
Manju is a lesbian woman who poses as a man and works as a car mechanic in a garage owned by wealthy industrialist Jothipala. Manju is newly married to young Kusum who is not aware that Manju is a woman. They have sexual relations but always with lights switched off and Manju always takes her showers alone at home. Seems a happy couple to the outside world, Manju continues her deception dressed as a man, so she can earn more money in the Sri Lankan society where men are paid more than women. Manju also avoids communal showers at work to hide her secret from her co-workers.

One day, Manju's life takes a drastic turn when she is met with an automobile accident and admitted to hospital. The nurse on duty Monika identifies the long hidden secret and informs Dr. Abdul about her true identity. Dr. Abdul who suffers from compulsive sexual behaviour gets obsessed with Manju and starts to bribe her, getting his household chores done and forcing Manju to perform oral sex on him in order not to reveal her secret to the society.

Priyath is Manju's co-worker and her best friend. Being a bisexual man, Priyath who only knows Manu as a man has a love interest towards her. Manju avoids Priyath's sexual advances but remains close to him because he is the only person who is a genuine friend to her. Priyath who is aware that Jothipala is a playboy who hires new girls on frequent basis to work in his office, tells Manju about his sexual adventures over the years with the intention of arousing her. He tries to shower with Manju and often poses naked in front of her but Manju avoids him.

One night after work, a prostitute hired by Dr. Abdul follows Manju near a bus halt and befriends her to obtain her personal information. On the second night, she gets to know that Manju is married to Kusum and also that she works in a garage owned by Jothipala, who happens to be a schoolmate of Dr. Abdul. Following morning, Dr. Abdul tells the secret about Manju to Jothipala who in turn tells Priyath while he was fixing a car of a wealthy young lady. Distraught, Priyath and the other workers strip Manju and confirms their doubts.

When the news is spread across the neighborhood, soccer player Vishal visits Kusum making her obscene gestures and provokes the neighbors to write graffiti in their apartment walls implying they are lesbians. Shocked, Kusum questions Manju when she returns home and forcefully removes her top which reveals a bra concealed under her tightly worn tube. The verbal insults escalate from the neighbors and Kusum runs outside in agony and betrayal but Manju comes forward naked to the crowd who becomes dumbstruck.

Police is called and Manju is apprehended while Kusum runs fanatically behind the police jeep.

== Cast ==
- Anoma Janadari as Manju, a lesbian woman who poses as a man
- Gayani Gisanthika as Kusum, Manju's wife
- Mahendra Perera as Priyath, a Mechanic
- W. Jayasiri as Dr. Abdul
- Nirdha Uyanahewa as Nurse Monika
- Jagath Chamila as Vishal, a Soccer player
- Wilson Gunaratne as Jothipala, a Garage owner

== International recognition ==
- Award of Best Asian Film 2002 at the 15th Tokyo International Film Festival.
- Screened at Festival due film Asiatique de Deauville (France) and Paris
- Screened at Raindance Film Festival – London in March
- Screened at Jeonju IFF (Korea) in April
- Screened at Sydney Film Festival (Australia) in June * Screened at Calgary IFF (Germany) in October.
- Screened at San Sebestian International Film Festival of Rotterdam (Netherlands)
- Screened at Singapore International Film Festival
