= Aksharaya =

2005 Sri Lankan film

Aksharaya (A Letter Of Fire)
- Directed by: Asoka Handagama
- Written by: Asoka Handagama
- Produced by: Iranthi Abeyasinghe; Laurent Aleonard
- Starring: Piyumi Samaraweera; Ravindra Randeniya; Saumya Liyanage; Jayani Senanayake
- Cinematography: Channa Deshapriya
- Edited by: Ravindra Guruge
- Music by: Harsha Makalanda
- Release date: September 2005 (San Sebastián Film Festival)
- Running time: 136 minutes
- Country: Sri Lanka
- Languages: English; Sinhala

Aksharaya (A Letter of Fire) is a 2005 Sri Lankan adult drama film directed by Asoka Handagama.

== Plot ==
Aksharaya is about a 12-year-old boy (Isham Samzudeen), and his parents. His father is a retired High Court Judge (Ravindra Randeniya) and his mother (Piyumi Samaraweera) is a famous magistrate in the city.

Due to her husband's psychological impotency, the magistrate has much consensual affection for her child and that cause so much tension between the couple and between the father and the son. There is a clue that there are much darker secrets lying behind their sophisticated mansion walls.

The boy is caught watching porn with a friend at school. This act catalyzes the friend's mounting guilt and assumes the police are after both of them. The boy and his friend escape from the school and hide in an abandoned building. The friend's guilt augments to the point of contemplating suicide; the dagger he has on his person becomes the tool of choice and the boy wants to help his friend commit suicide. Before they can go through with the act, they hear footsteps. Again, thinking it is the police, they run throughout the building, looking for a hiding place. Once secured in a closed off room, they wait for the footsteps to disappear. The footsteps get closer and the boy uses the dagger to stab the presumed policeman, so they can yet again, run away. The policeman turns out to be a prostitute.

The boy and friend separate, and the boy runs to the National Museum to hide out. He is able to blend in with another school group. He meets a school aged girl and persuades her to stay with him until it closes. This is not hard, as the girl is the museum's security guard's daughter. The security guard finds them both, and takes them to his small apartment.

The magistrate finds where the boy is located and goes to bribe the security guard to keep him safe. The next morning, the magistrate, on national television, announces that the police should do their duty and find the prostitute's murderer, even though the accused is her son.

After a day or two, the magistrate goes to the National Museum to talk to the security guard about moving her son so he will remain safe. She goes inside of the museum and stays until after dark. The security guard goes in to warn her about an inspector who has been hired to watch her every move. This leads to an extended scene with the magistrate revealing that the High Court Judge is both her and the boy's father.

The magistrate got suddenly an emotional brake and become so aggressive and vulnerable, smash some valuable antiques in the museum, questioning the country's historical values and aspirations comparing to personal desires and basic human nature.

The movie ends with the magistrate attempting to severely injure the security guard, the security guard raping the magistrate, then running after her with a javelin picked from a museum display. She runs to the apartment where the boy in the meantime is recreating what happened to the prostitute for the security guard's daughter. Instead of stabbing air, the boy stabs his mother as she approaches the door and dies.

== Cast ==
- Piyumi Samaraweera
- Ravindra Randeniya
- Saumya Liyanage
- Jayani Senanayake
- Isham Samsudeen
- Dinithi Walgamage
- Kumara Thirimadura

== Controversy ==
The film depicted a scene where a child and his mother both get into a bathtub nude. After the child overcomes the initial shock of seeing his mother completely nude, he insists on being breastfed — a request which the mother forcefully turns down. A Sri Lankan government minister banned the film despite the fact that Sri Lanka's censorship body, the Public Performance Board (PPB), had cleared it for adult viewership in local screenings.
