= House of My Fathers =

- Sinhala: නොමියෙන මතකය
- Directed by: Suba Sivakumaran
- Written by: Suba Sivakumaran
- Produced by: Suba Sivakumaran; Dominique Welinski; Santi Pathak
- Starring: Steve De La Zilwa; Darshan Dharmaraj; Bimal Jayakodi; Dasun Pathirana
- Cinematography: Kalinga Deshapriya Vithanage
- Edited by: Nse Asuquo
- Music by: Forest Christenson
- Production company: Palmyrah Talkies
- Release date: 18 May 2019 (United States)
- Running time: 95 minutes
- Country: Sri Lanka
- Languages: Sinhala; Tamil; English

House of My Fathers (Sinhala: නොමියෙන මතකය) is a 2019 Sri Lankan multilingual drama thriller film directed by Suba Sivakumaran as her debut film and co-produced by director himself with Dominique Welinski and Santi Pathak for Palmyrah Talkies. It stars Steve De La Zilwa and Darshan Dharmaraj along with Bimal Jayakodi and Dasun Pathirana. Music composed by Forest Christenson. The film was premiered in New Currents competition at Busan International Film Festival. It has received mostly positive reviews from critics. The film is the first Sri Lankan film acquired international rights by Asian Shadows, a Hong Kong–based sales agency.

== Cast ==
- Bimal Jayakodi as Asoka
- Pradeepa as Ahalya
- Steve De La Zilwa
- Darshan Dharmaraj
- Dasun Pathirana
- Deepa Seevaratnam

== International screening ==
The film has screened internationally in many film festivals.

- Busan International Film Festival – New Currents competition
- Mumbai Film Festival – World Cinema Section
- BFI London Film Festival – Debate Strand
- Filmfest Hamburg – Political Competition
- Rotterdam International Film Festival 2019 – Bright Future Section
- Geneva International Film Festival and Forum on Human Rights (FIFDH) 2019 – International Competition
- Seattle International Film Festival 2019 – New Directors Competition
