= Komaali Kings =

2018 film directed by King Ratnam

- Film poster
- Directed by: King Ratnam
- Written by: King Ratnam
- Produced by: Picture This Motions
- Starring: Darshan Dharmaraj; Niranjani Shanmugaraja
- Cinematography: Mahinda Abeysinghe
- Edited by: Anjelo Jones
- Music by: Shriraam Sachi
- Release date: 23 February 2018
- Running time: 125 minutes (2 hours and 5 minutes)
- Country: Sri Lanka
- Language: Tamil
- Budget: Rs. 30 million

Komaali Kings (transl. Clown kings) is a 2018 Sri Lankan Tamil language black comedy thriller film written and directed by King Ratnam in his directorial debut and co-produced by Ganesh Deivanayagam, Bawadharani Rajasingham, and R. Selvaskandan for Picture This Motions. The film, starring Raja Ganeshan, Kamala Sri Mohan, Darshan Dharmaraj, Gajan Kanesshan, Niranjani Shanmugaraja, Sathiyapriya Ratnasaamy, and King Ratnam in the lead roles, opened to positive reviews among the audience after the first day. The film also received praise from critics for its satire and comedy storyline.

Komaali Kings is considered one of the rarest and most important mass-budgeted films in Sri Lankan Tamil cinema in nearly 40 years since the release of the super hit Komaligal in 1976. Komaali Kings was one of the most awaited films in Sri Lankan cinema after its production was started back in 2016 with only 26 days of shooting procedure but there were delays due to unavoidable factors, and was finally released nationwide on 23 February 2018 after 2 years of delays. The film has both Sinhala and English subtitles.

The film won Best Tamil Film of the Year award from the Derana Film Awards 2019.

== Plot ==
The film's title is inspired by the Sri Lankan box office hit 1976 Tamil film Komaligal. The theme of the movie is simple but a master plan.

"Komaali Kings" revolves around Siva Sithambaram (Raja Ganesan), an average next-door neighbour whose mundane life takes a hilarious turn when a distant relative Pat (King Ratnam) and his family from London decide to stay with him for the duration of their trip to attend a family wedding.

== Cast ==
Apart from the three lead actors, the film consists of an all-Sri Lankan crew, with most of them making their acting debuts.

- Darshan Dharmaraj as Mohan
- Niranjani Shanmugaraja as Yoga
- King Ratnam as Pat
- Raja Ganesan as Siva Sithambaram
- Gajan Kanesshan as Babeth Baba
- Gk Reginold Eroshon as Utha Hussain
- David as Groom
- Kamalasiri Mohan Kumar as Mrs. Siva
- Nekita Reshani as Baba's girlfriend
- Adri Abilash as Angelo
- Enoch Akshay as Agilan
- Anushyanthan as Kutty
- Kamalraj Balakrishnan as Roshan
- Meena Deivanayagam as Vaishoo
- Navayuga Rajkumar as Mohan's wife
- Priya Luvendran as news anchor
- Priyantha Sirikumara as Baba's driver
- Daya Wayaman as van driver
- Goabi Ramanan as Swamiji
- Pathurjan Wijesekara as Swamiji's assistant

== Production ==
A team announced the filming process for a Tamil movie to be produced in Sri Lanka titled "Komaali Kings" earlier in the year 2016, on January 23. The team stated that Komaali Kings was an attempt to rekindle and re-establish nostalgic memories of the hay days of Sri Lankan Tamil cinema, mainly as the Sri Lankan Tamil cinema was demolished due to the Sri Lankan civil war which prevailed in Sri Lanka for 30 years. Initially, the director of the film wanted to prepare a script on a crime thriller film with the title Nuni before changing his mindset to arrange a script for a black comedy film. The trailer for the film was released in 2016 and the first look poster of the film was released by popular Indian director K. S. Ravikumar. Veteran Sri Lankan radio announcer and the actor who starred in the film Komaligal, B. H. Abdul Hameed, served as the honourable patron of this landmark film.

The film was shot in Tamil-resident areas of Sri Lanka, such as Jaffna, Batticaloa, Malayagam, and Colombo, as the film includes the usage of 6 different slangs of Tamil that exist in the nation. The movie also comprises a mixture of Tamil, Sinhala, Muslim, and Christian cultures to indicate the unity between races in the nation.

== Soundtrack ==
The songs and background score for this film were composed by Shriraam Sachi in his debut as a music director. This is a debut film for the singers as well.

No.	Title	Lyrics	Singer(s)	Length
1.	"Kootathil Govinda"	Shriraam Sachi	MC Rajkumar, Sutha, Adri Abilash, Shriraam Sachi, Sooriyakala.R.Sharma
2.	"We are going shopping ya"	Varun Thushyanthan, King Ratnam	Kanagaratnam Lawrence, Saasha Karunaratne, GK Reginold Eroshan, King Ratnam
3.	"Kuberanukkum Sangu"	Shriraam Sachi	Shriraam Sachi, King Ratnam

== Release ==
The film was initially released in theatres in Feb 23, 2018. Later it was also made available in a streaming site named Ceynema.lk
