= Kadalora Kaatru =

- Directed by: N. Kesavarajan
- Cinematography: Kiruba
- Edited by: K. Siva
- Music by: Isaipriyan
- Production company: Niedharshanam
- Release date: 31 December 2002
- Running time: 118 minutes
- Country: Sri Lanka
- Language: Tamil

Kadalora Kaatru (transl. A Wind Along the Coast) is a 2002 Sri Lankan Tamil-language war drama film produced by the LTTE.

== Plot ==
The film is about a fishing family from the north caught up in the midst of the civil war. The film features the Sea Tigers.

== Soundtrack ==
The music was composed by Isaipriyan and was written by Naavanan, Mullaikamal, and Veera. The songs were sung by Kumarasamy, Santhan, Vaseegaran, and Yuvaraj.

- "Kadalora Karai"
- "Vaa Vaa Enre Alaikuthu Kadala"
- "Oru Vizhi Mazhaiyinai Pozhigir"

== Release ==
The film was released on 31 December 2002 in all eight districts of North Eastern Sri Lanka. This is the first time that a film produced by the LTTE was released in the government controlled areas. The LTTE had previously produced around 50 movies and released them in areas that they controlled. The screening of the film was due to the peace talks initiated by Norway.
