= Kaathirupaen Unakaaha =

- Directed by: S. V. Chandran
- Screenplay by: Navaliyur N Sellathurai
- Story by: M. Jayarraj
- Cinematography: S. Devendran
- Edited by: S. V. Chandran
- Music by: R. Muthusami
- Production company: Jayendra Movies
- Release date: 1977
- Country: India
- Language: Sri Lanka

Kaathirupaen Unakaaha (I will wait for you) is a 1977 Sri Lankan Tamil-language romantic film.

== Plot ==
The plot revolves around a love triangle, which unfolds into a tragedy.

Raji loves Raja, Raja however is in love with Shantha. The plot twists further as Raji's brother Kannan and Raja's sister Vanita fall in love with each other.

Knowing that Raja is in love with Shantha and is about to marry her, Raji's brother Kannan rapes Vanita in order to blackmail Raja into marrying Raji. By tradition in Tamil culture once a girl is raped or has had sexual relations with a man she has to marry him or she is shunned by society.

The rest of the story unravels the choice that Raja makes. Does he break Shantha's heart and marry Raji to save his sister's life or does he follow his heart at any cost?

== Cast ==
Character	Cast
Raja	Sivaram
Shantha	Geetanjali
Shantha's Mother	Rukmani Devi
Raji	Krishna Kumari
Kannan	Selvaraj
Vanita	Jeyadevi

Other actors include Na. Chelladurai, A. M. Latheef, Viswanatha Raja, Sridevi, and Chandra.

== Production ==
This movie had been the dream project of Muthiah Jayarraj, son of Muniyadi Thaever Muthiah, (the former owner of Ramachandra Estate, Wattegama, Sri Lanka). Mr M Jayarraj along with his two brothers Mr Ramachandran and Mr Dheenadhalyan and three friends S.V. Balasubramaniyam, Maruthapillai Dharmalingam and P.Karuppaiha formed a production company by the name of Jayendra Movies in Wattegama Sri Lanka. This venture began in 1976. The filming took place in various areas of Sri Lanka, including Matale, Colombo, Kandy, Theldeniya and Dehiwala.

Mr Jayarraj had aspired to be an actor but due to certain circumstances was unable to act as the lead of the film. He had instead taken the role of Production Manager. The film was released in 1977 in theatres throughout Sri Lanka. Unfortunately, due to the political turmoil that took place at the time of the release, the film was not screened in theatres for more than 3 weeks.

== Reception ==
A critic from the cinema magazine Geetha wrote that this film has proven that a love story can also be a meaningful family story. Although the dialogues are spread throughout the film, they come alive when they come out of the mouths of the main actors.
