= Ini Avan =

2012 film by Asoka Handagama

- Sinhala: ඉනියවන්
- Directed by: Asoka Handagama
- Written by: Asoka Handagama
- Produced by: Anura Fernando; Jagath Wellavaththa; Ravindra Pieris
- Starring: Darshan Dharmaraj; Subashini Balasubramaniyam; Niranjani Shanmugaraja
- Cinematography: Channa Deshapriya
- Edited by: Ajith Ramanayake
- Music by: Kapila Poogalaarachchi
- Release date: 7 September 2012
- Running time: 104 minutes
- Country: Sri Lanka
- Language: Tamil

Ini Avan (Sinhala: ඉනියවන්; lit. 'Him, Here After') is a 2012 Sri Lankan Tamil-language post-war drama film directed by Asoka Handagama and co-produced by Anura Fernando, Jagath Wellavaththa and Ravindra Pieris. It stars Darshan Dharmaraj and Subashini Balasubramaniyam in lead roles along with Niranjani Shanmugaraja and Raja Ganeshan. Music composed by Kapila Poogalaarachchi. It is the 1244th Sri Lankan film in the Cinema of Sri Lanka. The films had positive reviews from critics. The film was also screened at the 65th Cannes Film Festival and the 37th Toronto International Film Festival (TIFF) in 2012.

== Cast ==
- Darshan Dharmaraj as Avan / Him
- Subhashini Balasubramaniam
- Niranjani Shanmugaraja
- Raja Ganeshan
- King Ratnam
- Malcolm Machado
- Mr & Mrs. Thairiyanathan
- G.P. Ferminas
- Maheswary Rathnam

== Awards ==
The film was a major contender for every film festival held in the year. The film has won many awards including the best film, director and many more in many film festivals.

- Hiru Golden Film Awards 2012 Award of the Best Director - Ashoka Handagama
- Hiru Golden Film Awards 2012 Award of the Best Actor - Darshan Dharmaraj
- Hiru Golden Film Awards 2012 Award of the Best Supporting Actress
- Hiru Golden Film Awards 2012 Award of the Best Editor - Ajith Ramanayake
- Hiru Golden Film Awards 2012 Award of the Best Film
- Derana Lux Film Awards 2013 Award of the Best Film
- Derana Lux Film Awards 2013 Award of the Best Screenplay - Ashoka Handagama
- Derana Lux Film Awards 2013 Award of the Best Director - Ashoka Handagama
- Derana Lux Film Awards 2013 Award of the Best Actor - Darshan Dharmaraj
- Derana Lux Film Awards 2013 Award of the Best Actress - Niranjani Shanmugaraja
- Derana Lux Film Awards 2013 Award of the Best Supporting Actor - Raja Ganeshan
- 37th SIGNIS Salutation Cinema Awards 2014 Award for the Best Director - Ashoka Handagama
- 37th SIGNIS Salutation Cinema Awards 2014 Award for the Best Screenplat - Ashoka Handagama
