= Giovanni Pietro Maffei =

Italian Jesuit and author

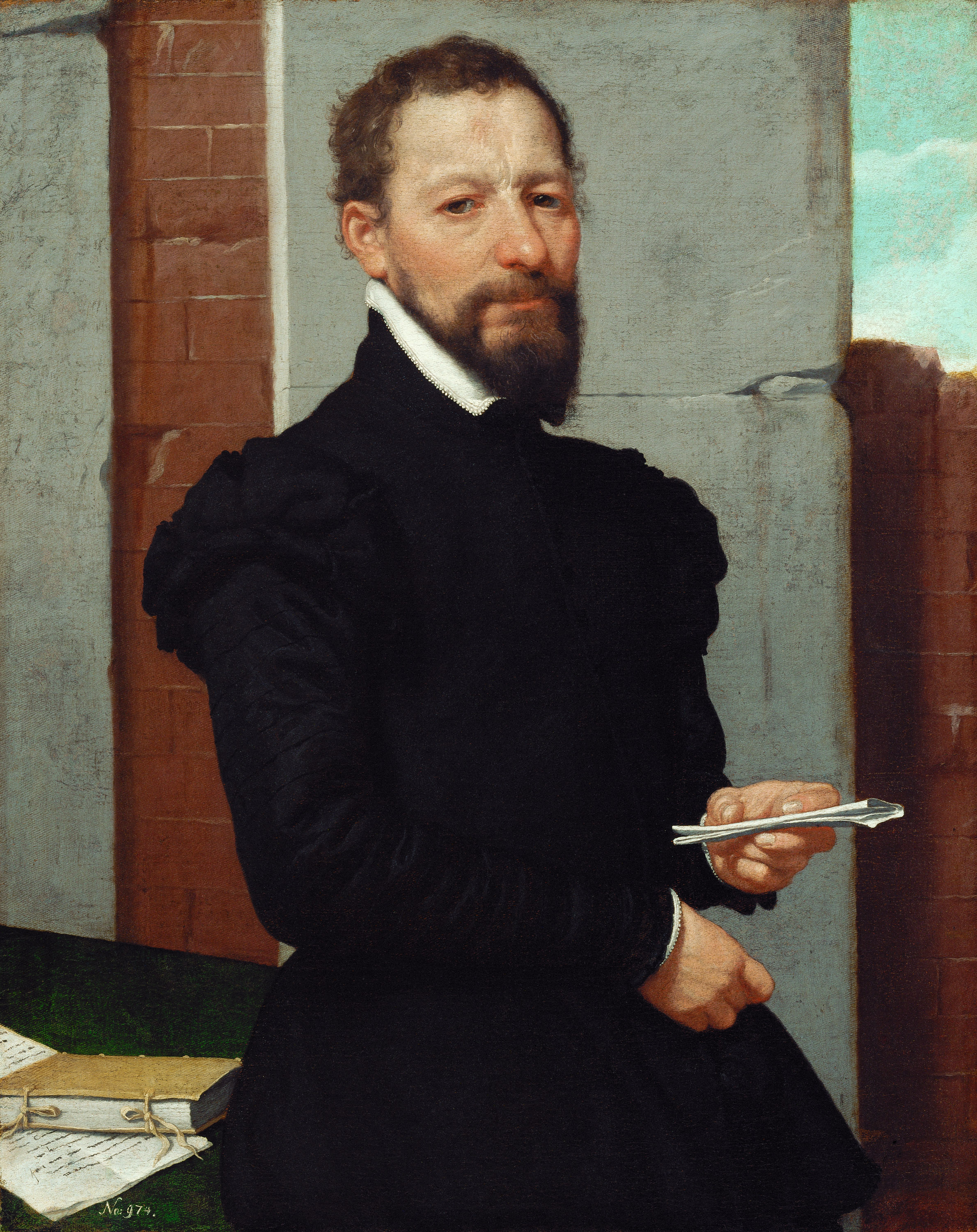
- Born: 1536; Bergamo
- Died: 20 October 1603 (aged 66–67)
- Movement: Jesuit

Academic work
- Discipline: history rhetoric
- Institutions: Pontifical Gregorian University
- Notable works: Historiarum Indicarum libri XVI (1585); De vita et moribus Ignatii Loiolae libri III (1585)

Giovanni Pietro Maffei (1536–1603), also anglicized as John Peter Maffei, was an Italian Jesuit and author. He wrote a life of Ignatius of Loyola, founder of the Society of Jesus, and also wrote about the activities of the Society in the Orient.

== Biography ==
Giovanni Pietro Maffei was born at Bergamo about 1536; he was for a time professor at Genoa, became in 1564 secretary of the government at that place, and in 1565 joined the Jesuits, among whom he gained a great reputation. Brought to the notice of cardinal Henry, of Portugal, he was called to Lisbon. He died in Tivoli in 1603. Maffei wrote De vita et moribus Ignatii Loiolae (Romae 1585): — Historiarum Indicarum libri XVI (Florentiae, 1589; often reprinted): — Vite di XVII confessori di Cristo (Roma, 1601). At the request of Gregory XIII he wrote a history of the reign of that pope, which remained in MS. until 1743, when it was published at Rome by Carlo Coquelines. A History of India, written by request of cardinal Henry, was published without Maffei's name, though he was its author. His collected works, accompanied by a biographical sketch, were published under the style Io. Petri Maffeii Bergomatis e Societate Iesu opera omnia Latine scripta, nunc primum in unum corpus collecta (Verona, 1747, 2 vols. 4to).

== Works ==
- De vita et moribus Ignatii Loiolae qui Societatem Iesu fundavit, libri III, apud Franciscum Zannettum, Romae 1585.
- Vite di XVII confessori di Cristo, Roma 1601.
- Le istorie delle Indie orientali con una scelta di lettere scritte dall'Indie, Filippo Giunti, Firenze 1589. Translated from latin to Italian by Francesco Serdonati, and published in two volumes in 1830 .
- Historiarum Indicarum libri XVI. Selectarum item ex India epistolarum libri IV, apud Philippum Iunctam, Florentiae 1589.
- Degli Annali di Gregorio XIII pontefice massimo dati in luce da Carlo Coquelines, Roma 1742.
