= Darshan Dharmaraj =

Sri Lankan actor (1981–2022)

- Born: 2 March 1981; Rakwana, Sri Lanka
- Died: 2 October 2022 (aged 41); Colombo, Sri Lanka
- Education: St. John Tamil College, Rakwana
- Occupation: Actor
- Years active: 2008–2022
- Spouse: Subhashini
- Children: 1
- Awards: Best Film Actor 2012

Darshan Dharmaraj (Tamil: தர்ஷன் தர்மராஜ், Sinhala: දර්ශන් ධර්මරාජ්; 2 March 1981 – 2 October 2022) was a Sri Lankan actor in film, theatre and television. He made his first television appearance in Sidney Chandrasekara's teledrama A9. He was awarded Best Actor Awards at several Film festivals in Sri Lanka for his portrayal as ex-LTTE cadre in Asoka Handagama's movie Ini Avan (2012).

== Early life and education ==
Dharmaraj was born in Rakwana, Sabaragamuwa Province, Sri Lanka. He completed his education from St. John's Tamil College.

== Career ==
In 2008, Dharmaraj was chosen for a Sinhala script by Sydney Chandrasekara's television serial A-Nine. Although he was not fluent with Sinhala at the time, he learnt the language within three months. He began his cinema career with the 2008 film Prabhakaran.

=== Selected Television Series ===
- A- Nine

== Death ==
Dharmaraj died from a heart attack at Colombo National Hospital on 2 October 2022, at the age of 41.

== Filmography ==
Key
†	Denotes films that have not yet been released

Year	Film	Role	Language	Notes
2008	Prabhakaran	LTTE leader	Sinhala	
2008	Machan	Suresh	Sinhala	
2009	Ira Handa Yata	LTTE soldier	Sinhala	
2012	Ini Avan (Him, Here After)	Avan	Tamil	Best Actor - Derana Lux Film Awards (2013); Best Actor - Hiru Golden Film Award (2014)
2012	Matha	Yoga	Sinhala	
2015	Address Na (No Address)	Gubbayame Goring	Sinhala	
2015	Spandana	Darshan	Sinhala	
2016	Ulath Ekai Pilath Ekai	Karapitiye Darshan	Sinhala	
2017	Aloko Udapadi	Datiya	Sinhala	
2018	Komaali Kings	Mohan	Tamil	
2018	Porisadaya	Kalu Mahaththaya	Sinhala	
2018	Davena Vihagun	Animal slaughter	Sinhala	
2019	House of My Fathers		Multilingual	
2020	Tsunami	Selvam	Sinhala	
2020	Suparna	AYO 433	Sinhala	
2021	Kawuruth Danne Na		Sinhala	
2021	Bhavatharana	Pandey	Sinhala	
2022	Praana	Cankili king	Sinhala	
2024	Passport	Gulliver	Sinhala	
2025	Walampoori: Seven and Half Dreams	Swami Makandaraja	Sinhala	
2025	Maria	Oscar	Sinhala	
TBA	Akarsha †	Raghu	Sinhala	
TBA	Bandura †		Sinhala	
TBA	Adventures of Ricky Deen †	Driver	Sinhala	
TBA	Monara Vilak †		Sinhala	
TBA	Jeewa †		Sinhala	
TBA	Case No 447 †	Announced	Sinhala	
TBA	Pampas †		Sinhala	

== See also ==
- Sri Lankan Tamils in Sinhala Cinema
