= Share the Love =

Share The Love

Studio album by Rev. Bibiladeniye Mahanama
- Released: March 2014
- Recorded: January 2011
- Genres: Spiritual, Buddhist, new age, Sri Lankan
- Length: 58:59
- Label: Music write
- Producer: Rev. Bibiladeniye Mahanama

Rev. Bibiladeniye Mahanama chronology
Sansara Sangramaye, Sudu Piyumak Se	Share The Love

Share The Love is a contemporary new age music relaxation album by Sri Lankan Spiritual Music Composer Rev. Bibiladeniye Mahanama, released on March 10, 2014. These twelve meaningful, well researched music compositions are mainly for the concentration of the human mind, and its theme “Share The Love” was adapted for the sole purpose of, to love the environment as thyself.

== Track list ==
1. A Graceful Moon
2. Share the Love
3. Pilgrim's Path
4. Life's Satisfaction
5. Feather in the Wind
6. Dance of the Shrubs
7. Deliverance
8. Equanimity
9. After the Quake
10. A Feeling
11. Autumn's Fall (bonus track)
12. Desert Sand (bonus track)

== Personnel ==
=== Musicians ===
- John Anthony (Steel, Nylon guitar)
- Dinesh Subasinghe (Violin)
- Warren Van Gramberg (Keyboard, piano)
- Mohan Premathilake (Guitar)
- Nimantha Heshan (Vocals)
- Gayan Fernando (Bass guitar)
- Kasun Primaal (Vocals)
- Dilshan Malith (Violin)
- Nuwan Balasuriya (Flute)
- Praneeth Saranga (Violin)
- Tharindya Amarathunga (Vocals)
- Senanga Dissanayake (Piano)
- Dumal Warnakula (Vocals)
- Raween Kanishka (Vocals)
- Meena Prasadini (Vocals)
- Chandra Thilakarathne (Violin)
- Lashitha Abegunawardhana (Violin)
- Indika Rajintha (Flute)

=== Engineers ===
- Ruwan Walpola – Natural Fx Designer
- Nick Gasmena - Mastering Engineer
