= Matha (film) =

- Film poster
- Sinhala: මාතා
- Directed by: Boodee Keerthisena
- Written by: Ariyaratne Athugala
- Produced by: Ruwan Jayasingha; Sanath Ranaweera; Vijaya Rathnayake
- Starring: Darshan Dharmaraj; Yasodha Radhakrishnan; Thumindu Dodantenna
- Cinematography: Milton Kam; Donald Karunaratna; K.A.Darmasena
- Edited by: Stephen Philipson
- Music by: Lakshman Joseph De Saram
- Release date: 19 February 2012
- Country: Sri Lanka
- Languages: Sinhala; Tamil

Matha (Sinhala: මාතා) is a 2012 Sri Lankan Sinhala and Tamil romantic war film directed by Boodee Keerthisena and co-produced by Ruwan Jayasingha, Sanath Ranaweera and Vijaya Rathnayake. It stars Darshan Dharmaraj and Yasodha Radhakrishnan in lead roles along with Thumindu Dodantenna and Raja Ganeshan. Music composed by Lakshman Joseph De Saram. It is the 1244th film in the Sri Lankan cinema.

== Plot ==
The story revolves around two lovers who are LTTE carders fighting for a separate land. The film deals with the moments of the final battle of Eelam war in Sri Lanka, while the two characters struggle to find a way to protect their expected child.

== Cast ==
- Darshan Dharmaraj as Yoga
- Yasodha Radhakrishnan as Parvati
  - Divya Dharshanee as Young Parvati
- Dharmapriya Dias as Lt. Dias
- Thumindu Dodantenna as Nimal
- Raja Ganeshan as Parvati and Puri's father
- Mallika Keerthi as Parvati and Puri's mother
- Gayan Perera
- K.M Pavithra as Puri, Parvati's brother
- Kriz Chris as Foreign Journalist
- Buddhika Jayarathne as Damitha
- Vimukthi Jayasundara as Kamal
- Dasun Pathirana as Lucky
- Mahendra Perera as Galariya
- Ravindra Randeniya as Brigadier
- Wasantha Wittachchi as Sergeant Major Valikala
- Rakith Warawitage as Jude

== Awards ==
The film has won eight awards in two different film festivals for the best cinematography, editing, music, Visual effects, make up, child actor including two SIGNIS awards 2013.

- 2013 Derana Lux Film Festival Award for the Best VFX - Buddhi Keerthisena
- 2013 Derana Lux Film Festival Award for the Best makeup - Wasantha Wittachchi and Upul Mahanama
- 2013 Derana Lux Film Festival Award for the Best Child Actor - K. M. Pavithra
- 2013 Derana Lux Film Festival Award for the Best Editor - Steven Phillipson
- 2013 Derana Lux Film Festival Award for the Best Cinematography - Milton Kam, Donald Karunaratne, Keta A. Dharmasena
