= King Ratnam =

Sri Lankan actor and film director

- Occupations: Actor, film director
- Known for: Komaali Kings
- Relatives: M.S. Ratnam (grandfather), Jude Ratnam (brother)

King Ratnam is a Sri Lankan actor and film director. He is regarded as a talented film-maker in the nation, as he has directed numerous advertisements, short films, and documentary films. He played a key role in the production of a Sri Lankan made Tamil language feature-length film after 40 years in Sri Lankan Tamil cinema history as the director of the film titled, Komaali Kings. His attempt to rekindle and re-establish nostalgic memories of the hay days of Sri Lankan Tamil cinema is set to be one of the turning points in Sri Lanka's resilience from the lost glory in the Tamil cinema industry.

== Early life ==
King Ratnam comes from a family with a background of art and cinema. He is the grandson of stage, radio, and film artist M.S. Ratnam.

He is the younger brother of Jude Ratnam, also a film director who is known for successfully directing the short documentary film Demons in Paradise related to the July 1983 riots.

== Career ==
King was part of the 2012 film before starring in the 2016 Sinhala romantic film, Let Her Cry. Apart from acting, he also became a professional director as he was inspired by his elder brother, Jude Ratnam. King Ratnam rose to prominence as a director through the Sri Lankan short documentary film, Echoing Hills, which was released in 2014 and got positive reviews. He made his directorial debut in a feature-length film for the first time with Komaali Kings. He himself plays an important role as "Pat" in the film.

== Filmography ==
Year	Film	Role	Language	Notes
2012	Ini Avan		Tamil	
2016	Let Her Cry		Sinhala	
2018	Komaali Kings	Pat	Tamil	Also director
2023	800	Arjuna Ranatunga	Tamil	
2025	Rani	Ronnie Gunasinghe	Sinhala	
