= Boodee Keerthisena =

Sri Lankan filmmaker

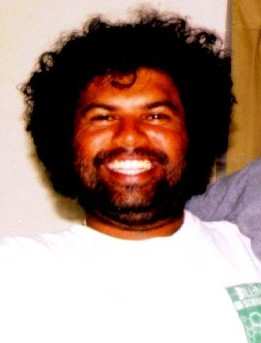
- Boodee in 2007
- Born: Vishvanath Buddhika Keerthisena; 11 August 1966 (age 59)
- Education: School of Visual Arts (BFA FILM)
- Occupations: Actor, director, producer, screenwriter, editor, composer, dress designer
- Years active: 1986–present
- Notable work: Mille Soya, Matha

Vishvanath Buddhika Keerthisena, also known as Boodee Keerthisena, is a Sri Lankan filmmaker. He began his career drawing comics before moving into painting, dress design, and visual arts. He moved into music in the late 1980s, and performed in a band called "Boo-Dee and the Woo-Zees" (1986–1992) as the lead singer.

In 1987, he went to New York City to study film. He joined the film department to study film and television at the School of Visual Arts in Manhattan. His thesis, presented at his graduation in 1995, was the feature film Veils of Maya (Sihina Deshayen – 1993). The film won 31 awards in many festivals, including Best Director and Best Film.

Since he returned to Sri Lanka in 1995, he has directed and produced over 100 TV commercials, more than 30 documentaries, two TV series, and many music videos.

His work is influenced by John Cassavetes and contains elements of "cinema-verite" style.

== Filmography ==
- The director and co-writer of "Adventures of Ricky Deen", a feature film that deals with a failed actor who comes across himself crossed over from a different reality trying to gain his original identity back. The film was entirely shot on an iPhone 5. It was in production from 2013 to 2014.
- The director and co-writer of "Alone in A Valley" (Nimnayaka Hudekalawa), a film of a man who sees his life, existence, and death through time and space. It was produced in 2013.
- The director and VFX supervisor of "Matha", a story that revolves around two lovers who are LTTE cadets fighting for a piece of land. The film deals with the final moments of battle of an EELAM war in Sri Lanka, while the two characters struggle to find a way to protect a child the woman is expecting to give birth to. "Matha" won eight awards in two different film festivals for the best cinematography, editing, music, visual effects, make up and child actor, including two SIGNIS awards in 2013.
- The director and writer of "Buongiorno Italia" (Mille Soya), a feature film about a group of young Sri Lankan musicians illegally migrating to Italy in the baggage compartment of a bus. The film articulates the lost dreams of Sri Lankan youth that are caught between a civil war and corrupt politics and follows their journey into hope. Was produced in Sri Lanka and Italy in 2003. The film won 16 awards, including best film, director, editor and art director SIGNIS awards in 2005.
- The director, production designer and co-music composer of the feature film “The Veils of Maya”, a story based around a theatre group whose production of a colonial play is interrupted by the death of one of its members by a bomb planted on a bus by ethnic separatist terrorists. From the other side of death he reveals to the viewers the story of what happened to him. The film won 31 awards, and was produced in Sri Lanka in 1996.
- The director and editor of the short film “Redeem”. The film is about the uprising of a socialist group who aimed to overthrow the government, and how the university students were affected by it and the unrest that the normal people of the country had to go through. It was produced in Sri Lanka in 1989.

== Television series ==
- The director and producer of "Fords Super Model of the Year" reality TV show, and was produced in Sri Lanka in October/November of 2007.
- The developer, writer, director and cinematographer of “Sathya” a 20-part action thriller series. It was produced in 2002.
- He has developed, directed and produced the 24-episode series “Bakkannila”, a comedy talk show with local celebrities along the lines of David Letterman and Jay Leno. Was produced from 1997–2000.

== TV commercials ==
Keerthisena shot and directed over 120 TV commercials between 1996 and December 2001. Products that he made commercials for include HSBC (Hong Kong and Shanghai Banking Corporation), Bata, Caltex, Eveready Batteries and Nestle Products.

== Documentaries ==
- The producer of "Vanishing Paradise", a documentary film of a foreigner who hunted and killed 1400 elephants for personal entertainment during the British colonial period. He was killed by a lightning strike and his grave was struck by lightning three times. Produced in 2006.
- The producer of a film on the 2550-year-old Vesak celebrations in Sri Lanka. This is a documentary on a village family which comes to the city to see the Vesak day celebrations, which goes through the tension and heavy security threats of bomb scares. Produced in 2006.
- The director and producer of a half-hour 30-episode TV series "Paata Paata", about the use of colour in the architecture of Sri Lanka. Was produced in 2001.
- The director of "Sri Lanka", a short documentary made for the Sri Lankan Tourist Board to be aired and shown for promotional work around the world. Was produced in 2000.
- The director of a corporate documentary made for Sri Lanka Telecom for Internet and video conferencing. Was produced in 1999.
- The director of "Brain Drain", a half-hour program on valuable individuals leaving the island to live elsewhere.
- The director "Women in the Free Trade Zone", a half-hour documentary on women workers of Sri Lanka looking at the hardships in their lives. Was produced in 1996.
- The director, editor and co-producer of "Late 20th Century Opera Composers". Interviews include Philip Glass, Allen Ginsberg and John Moran. Produced in 1996.
- The director of "Illegally Legal", a half-hour documentary about Sri Lankans who illegally cross to Italy and how they become legal. It also includes their account of how it feels to be in between two countries.

== Awards ==
- Best VFX (Derana Film Festival) award recipient 2013 for the feature film "Matha".
- Best Director Presidential Award recipient 2005 for the feature film "Buongiorno Italia" (Mille Soya).
- Best Director, Writer, SIGNIS, Sarasavi and National awards recipient of 2005 for the feature film "Buongiorno Italia" (Mille Soya).
- Best Director, Co-Composer, Production Designer, and seven awards including two FIPRSCI received in 1997. Two gold, two silver and one bronze award were received for his TV commercials by (SLIM Sri Lanka Institute of Marketing. Awards were received in 1996, 1997, 1998 and 2001.

== Screenplays yet to be produced ==
Writer of six feature film screenplays and a detective thriller 20 episode TV series:

- “24 Hours in Sri Lanka" – An NIB Officer who is married to a Tamil woman and a father of two children is given a tip that there is a bomb about to explode and he is in search of the bomb to dismantle it. 2006.
- “Bloodline" – Action adventure of a young boy who accidentally travels through time to the past, and then back to the future and again travels back to the past to set things right from what went wrong because of his intervention in the past. 2006.
- “ 7 7 7 " – A man finds a box with a head of a young girl and the special agents are looking for the owner of the head. 2004 (Adaptation of a 1934 novel)
- “Avigaththo" – Two friends who are working for an underground godfather, who is funded by politicians, are struggling through the friendship, loyalty and love coming in between their friendship. 1997.
- “Children of a Silent Age" – A story of two children who were adopted from Sri Lanka by foster parents in northern and southern Europe, who come down to find their biological parents, and the difficulties they go through while doing so.

== Special ==
Boodee currently works with the company "Elephant and the mouse" with many VFX as a Visual Effects Supervisor for his own films as well as other movies.

He wrote a column for the national newspaper Sunday Observer from 2009 to 2010.

In October 2012, Boodee was the key figure who helped put together the 1st Italian Sri Lankan Film Festival in Colombo, Sri Lanka, which was presented by the Italian Embassy in Colombo, Sri Lanka. The festival has a non-competitive feature film section and a competitive short film section.

Other activities include:

- Was the Director of Galle Film Festival in 2008.
- Teaches film and television editing at the National Film Corporation for Diploma and Certificate courses. 2006/2005.
- Visiting Lecturer in Cinema for University of Peradeniya, Sri Lanka for one year in 1997.
- Director of Film & TV Department of Vibhavi Academy of Fine Arts in Sri Lanka, from 1996 to 1998.
