= Asoka Handagama =

Sri Lankan filmmaker

- Born: December 1962 (age 63); Sri Lanka
- Occupations: Film director; screenwriter; Asst. Governor of Central Bank of Sri Lanka
- Years active: 1990s–present

Asoka Handagama (born December 1962) is a Sri Lankan filmmaker. He obtained his primary and secondary schooling at St. Mary's College and went on to study mathematics at the University of Kelaniya where he was awarded a first class honors degree. He obtained his MSc in Development Economics at Warwick University in 1995. He is also an Assistant Governor of the Sri Lankan Central Bank.

== Theater ==
Handagama's entry to film-making was through theater and television. His first theatrical effort, a play of Bhoomika, was to address the emerging ethnic crisis on the island. The play won the National Youth award for best direction in 1985. His second stage play, Thunder, placed second in Best Script at the 1987 State Drama Festival. When he directed his third play, Magatha, reactions to it were controversial. The play was challenged by the judicial system of Sri Lanka. However, Magatha was shown in almost all parts of the country. The play won the Best Original Script and Best Director award at the 1989 State Drama Festival. The script was published in 2011, and won the State Literary Award for Best Drama Script. His fourth stage play, A Death at an Antique Shop, debuted in 2021.

== Television series ==
Handagama's series Dunhidda Addara is a landmark in the history of tele-dramas in Sri Lanka. It won all nine main awards including the Best Script and Direction, at the OCIC awards in 1994. Diyaketa Pahana, his third TV work, added a new dimension to the traditional tele-feature series. Synthetic Sihina explored a way to have a post-modern political discussion in the form of a serious episodic tele-play. He exploited the short spell of "ceasefire" (2003–2006) observed by Government forces and the Liberation Tigers of Tamil Ealam (LTTE) to shoot his next television feature series, Take This Road in Jaffna, the northern capital of Sri Lanka to create a dialogue on the root causes of the ongoing war. East is Calling, the television feature series was on the same theme set in a tsunami rehabilitation camp.

== Films ==
Chanda Kinnarie was Handagama's debut in cinema. Breaking the rules of realism, this film indicated the formation of a cinematic language consisting of hyperrealistic images. The film won the award for Most Promising Director at the Critics' awards in 1994. It was also awarded Best Film, Best Director, and Best Screenplay at the 1998 OCIC awards. When he made his second film, Moon Hunt (1996), he worked with experienced Japanese cinematographer Akira Takada. The film needed a specialist in lighting camera technique, as the whole film takes place at night. Handagama received criticism from his local colleagues for using a foreign cinematographer. It won 6 main awards from Sri Lanka Film Critic's Forum awarded for Best Film, Best Director, Best Script, Best Actor, Best Actress, and Best Cinematography in 2000. For some technical reasons, the film did not come out to theaters in Sri Lanka.

Handagama's works started to attract independent film festival audience around the world with his movie Me Mage Sandai. Veteran Sri Lankan filmmaker Dr. Lester James Peiris named this work as the landmark film which launched the third revolution in Sri Lankan cinema. It was a bold revelation of impact of the war in rural life in the country. Novel in the form, this minimalist film traveled all around the world, was critically acclaimed at more than 50 international film festivals, and won numerous awards in Singapore, Chonju, Delhi, Houston, Bangkok and Tokyo. The film also gained critical success in Europe, and has been considered one of "the most outstanding revelations of the decade" by the prestigious French Film Review "Les Cahiers du Cinéma".

Flying with One Wing (2002) was yet another work by Asoka. This is the first time in this part of the world that the issue of gender politics is addressed in cinema. Having the World Premiere at the San Sebastian Film Festival (2002), it was adjudged as the Best Asian Film at the Tokyo International Film Festival (2002), Audience Award for Best Film at Torino International Film Festival.

Aksharaya (Letter of Fire) was considered the most controversial work and the most talked about film in his career. Banned in Sri Lanka, it raised a fundamental issue of freedom of cinematic expression in Sri Lanka's Supreme Court. Exposed only to international festivals like San Sebastian and Tokyo, this movie, banned in Sri Lanka, found its way to the YouTube where it has been seen by more than 3 million people there.

Disturbed by the painful experience he had with the Aksharaya struggle, he then went on to make a children's movie Vidhu (2010). Ini-Avan is considered the most accomplished cinematic work of Asoka Handagama. Premiered at Cannes 2012 as one of the films under ACID (l'Association du Cinéma Indépendant pour sa Diffusion-). Ini-Avan was one of the five films selected for in-depth discussions with the audience conducted by the University of Toronto at the Toronto International Film Festival. The film has been listed for many festivals including Edinburgh, Tokyo, Hamburg and many more.

== Filmography ==
Year	Film	Role
1998	Chanda Kinnari	Director, writer
1996	Sanda Dadayama	Director, writer
2000	Me Mage Sandai	Director
2002	Thani Thatuwen Piyabanna	Director, writer
2005	Aksharaya	Director, writer
2010	Vidhu	Director, writer
2012	Ini Avan	Director, writer
2016	Let Her Cry	Director, writer
2019	Asandhimitta	Director, writer
2022	Alborada	Director, writer
2025	Rani	Director, writer

== Awards and achievements ==
=== Theater ===
Year	Association	Category	Nominated work	Result	Ref.
1985	National Youth Awards	Best Original Play	Bhumika (1985)	Won	
1987	State Drama Festival	Best Original Script	Hena (1987)	First runner-up	
1989	State Drama Festival	Best Original Play	Magatha (1989)	Won	
1989	State Drama Festival	Best Director	Magatha (1989)	Won	
1989	State Drama Festival	Best Scriptwriter	Magatha (1989)	Won	

=== TV Features ===
Year	Association	Category	Nominated work	Result	Ref.
1994	OCIC Awards	Best Director	Dunhinda Addara (1992)	Won	
1994	OCIC Awards	Best Scriptwriter	Dunhinda Addara (1992)	Won	
2002	OCIC Awards	Best Director	Synthetic Sihina (1998)	Won	
2002	OCIC Awards	Best Scriptwriter	Synthetic Sihina (1998)	Won	
2007	OCIC Awards	Best Teleseries of the Year	East is Calling (2006)	Won	
1998	Sumathi Tele Awards	Best Director	Diya Keta Pahana (1997)	Won	
1998	Sumathi Tele Awards	Best Script	Diya Keta Pahana (1997)	Won	
1998	Sumathi Tele Awards	Best Production	Diya Keta Pahana (1997)	Won	
1998	Sumathi Tele Awards	Best Acting	Diya Keta Pahana (1997)	Won	
1998	Sumathi Tele Awards	Best Cinematography	Diya Keta Pahana (1997)	Won	
2004	RAIGAM Tele Awards	Best Director	Take This Road (2004)	Won	
2004	RAIGAM Tele Awards	Best Scriptwriter	Take This Road (2004)	Won	
2007	State Television Awards	Best Teleseries of the Year	East is Calling (2006)	Won	
