= Bandula Vithanage =

Sri Lankan actor, director

- බන්දුල විතානගේ
- Born: Bandula de Silva Vithanage; September 11, 1940; Gonagala, Sri Lanka
- Died: September 1, 2014 (aged 73); Colombo National Hospital
- Education: Carey College, Colombo; Dharmasoka College
- Occupations: Actor, Dramatist, Director
- Years active: 1963–2014
- Children: Nalaka Vithanage
- Relatives: Yashoda Wimaladharma (niece)

Bandula de Silva Vithanage (born 11 September 1940 – died 1 September 2014 as බන්දුල විතානගේ) [Sinhala]) was an actor and director in Sri Lankan cinema, stage drama and television as well as a translator, director, playwright and scriptwriter. One of the earliest pillars of Sri Lankan art and drama, Vithanage has produced several critically acclaimed television serials and stage dramas during his five decades of drama career. He is the pioneer to introduce Shakespearean theater to Sri Lankan theater with several plays such as Veniciye Velenda, Macbeth, Twelfth Night, Hamlet and Romeo and Juliet.

He died on 1 September 2014 at Colombo National Hospital at the age of 73.

== Personal life ==
He was born on 11 September 1940 in Gonagala. He attended Athuruwella Primary School for primary education and then moved to Carey College, Colombo to complete up to G.C.E O/L. He completed his A/L education at Dharmasoka College, Ambalangoda. He entered to the University of Colombo for higher education and came under the influence of renowned dramatist Ediriweera Sarachchandra's university drama circle. He graduated with a master's degree in Dramaturgy and Acting.

His son Nalaka Vithanage is a popular filmmaker. He has produced three stage dramas - Rathri Bojanaya (2004), Kasi Malla (2006) and Upanda Maranaya (2009). Nalaka is an old boy of Nalanda College, Colombo. Bandula Vithanage's niece Yashoda Wimaladharma is a popular actress in Sinhala television and cinema.

== Career ==
In 1963, he started stage drama acting with P. Velikala's production Rathnavali with the role 'Vidushaka'. In 1965, he produced his first theater play Megha Garjana, which is a translation of Harold Pinter's The Collection. He acted in Simon Navagattegama's Gangavak and then directed Sapaththu Kabalak Saha Maranayak. Along with fellow dramatist Tony Ranasinghe, Vithanage produced the popular stage play Veniciye Velenda in 1980.

He continued to produce several critically acclaimed foreign drama adaptations, which include Jean Anouilh's Becket, Romaya Gini Gani (based on Ray Cooney's Run for your wife), Sikuru Sanekeli.Senehebara Dolly (based on Thornton Wilder's The Matchmaker), Hiru Dahasa (based on Wilder's Our Town), Macbeth (2006), Twelfth Night (1988), Hamlet, Romeo and Juliet, and A Comedy of Errors.

He acted in small number of films where compare with efforts in theater and television. He worked with and assisted Vasantha Obeysekera in Wes Gaththo, and later acted in Dharmasena Pathiraja's Ahas Gawwa. His maiden cinema acting came through 1974 film Dahakin Ekek directed by Merril Albert. His most notable television production came through Bumuthurunu, Aththa Bindei and Asal Wasiyo, which were telecast in Rupavahini. In 2011, he produced the play Romaya Gini Gani-2 as a joint effort with actor Roger Seneviratne. Romaya Gini Gani-2 was based on Cooney's play Caught in the net. He directed the television comedy serials I Love Jennie in 2007 and Paththara Gedara in 2008. In 2009, he acted in the stage play produced by his son Nalaka, Upanda Maranaya.

He joined the Rupavahini Corporation (SLRC) in its early years and had a brief serving period. He lived in England for three and a half years after the expulsion from SLRC along with Lucien Bulathsinhala.

=== Selected stage plays ===
- 1963 - Rathnavali
- 1965 - Megha Garjana
- 1971 - Gangavak Sapattu Kabalak saha Maranayak
- 1974 - Becket
- 1980 - Venisiye Velenda
- 1982 - Dolosveni Rathriya (co-produced with Tony Ranasinghe)
- 1986 - Senehebara Dolly
- 1990 - Hiru Dahasa
- 1996 - Romaya Gini Gani
- 1998 - Sikuru Senakeli
- 2001 - Macbeth
- 2002 - Eliya
- 2003 - A Sonduru Minisa
- 2011 - Romaya Gini Gani 2

=== Selected television serials ===
- Amuthu Minissu
- Anthima Rathriya
- Antharjana Minisa
- Asal Vesiyo
- Asani Wesi
- Atta Bindei
- Bhavana - Akala Rathriya
- Bhawathra
- Bumu Thurunu
- Depath Nai
- Deva Daruwo
- Devana Warama
- Eka Iththaka Mal
- Heeye Manaya
- Hiru Avarata
- I Love Jennie
- Isisara Isawwa
- Jayathuru Sankaya
- Malaya
- Paradeesaya
- Paththara Gedara
- Punchi Kumarihami
- Puthu Senehasa
- Ranga Soba
- Rupantharaya
- Sudu Kapuru Pethi
- Three-wheel Malli
- Urumaya Soya
- Vishwanthari
- Yahaluwo

== Author work ==
He translated several Shakespearean plays into Sinhala language.

- Hamlet
- Veniciye Velenda
- Shekshpiyer Hadunaganimu
- Macbeth
- Haemotama Waeradila
- Romaya Gini Gani - 2
- Romeo Juliet
- Hamlet Sandeepanee
- Sikuru Sanakeli
- Senehabara Dolly
- Jeewana Rekawa
- Itu Pathuma
- Gilbert, Wilbert saha Anette
- A Sonduru Minisa

== Death ==
He died on 1 September 2014 at Colombo National Hospital while receiving treatments. His remaining were kept at Jayaratne Funeral Parlour in Borella on 2 September and brought to National Art Gallery on 4 September. Final rites performed at 4.00 pm and buried at Borella Cemetery on the same day.

== Awards and accolades ==
His play Sapaththu Kabalak Saha Maranayak won many awards at State Drama Festival in 1971 including Best Actress and Best Stage Designing. In 1996, the play Romaya Gini Gani won major awards including the Best Production, Best Script, Best Actor, Best Actress and Best Supporting actor at State Drama Festival. On 30 January 2011, a felicitation program was held at John de Silva Theatre to celebrate 70 years of his life.

=== State Drama Festival ===
Year	Nominee / work	Award	Result
1987	Senehebara Dolly	Best Translation production	Won
1990	Hiru Dahasa	Best Translation production	Won
1997	Romaya Gini Gani	Best Direction and Adaptation	Won

== Filmography ==
Year	Film	Role	Ref.
1970	Wes Gaththo		
1973	Dahakin Ekek	Drunken person	
1974	Ahas Gauwa	Trip friend	
1977	Pembara Madhu	University boy	
1978	Selinage Walawwa	Shashiya	
1978	Jodu Walalu		
1980	Sinhabahu		
1980	Api Dedena		
1981	Sathara Pera Nimithi	Chief monk	
1987	Viragaya	Chief clerk	
1993	Guru Gedara	Stage director	
1998	Dorakada Marawa		
1999	Re Ru		
1999	Theertha Yathra		
2001	Mathu Yam Dawasa		
2002	Agnidahaya		
2003	Sudu Kaluwara	Monk	
2003	Sulang Kirilli	Doctor	
2005	Sulanga	Senarathne's father	
2008	Machan	Drunken person	
2011	Nino Live	Nino's grandfather	
2013	Anithya	Milan's father	
2015	Sulanga Gini Aran		
2016	Sulanga Apa Ragena Yavi	Doctor	
2017	Nilanjana	Densil	
