= Mille Soya =

2004 film by Boodee Keerthisena

- Theatrical release poster
- Sinhala: මිල්ලේ සොයා
- Directed by: Boodee Keerthisena
- Written by: Boodee Keerthisena
- Produced by: Boodee Keerthisena
- Starring: Mahendra Perera; Jackson Anthony; Sanath Gunathilake; Kamal Addararachchi; Sangeetha Weeraratne
- Cinematography: Moishe Ben-Yaish; K.A. Dharmasena
- Edited by: Ravindra Guruge
- Music by: Lakshman Joseph De Seram
- Distributed by: CEL Theatres
- Release date: 21 October 2004
- Running time: 110 minutes
- Countries: Sri Lanka; Italy
- Languages: Sinhala; Italian
- Budget: US$ 100,000

Mille Soya (Buongiorno Italia) is a 2004 romantic musical film, written, produced and directed by Boodee Keerthisena. The film stars Mahendra Perera, Jackson Anthony, Sanath Gunathilake, Kamal Addararachchi, and Sangeetha Weeraratne. The film was released on 21 October 2004. The film received mostly positive reviews from critics.

The film is Sri Lanka's very first digital film. Shooting of the film was started in 1997 in Naples, Positano in Italy and in Chilaw in Sri Lanka. It is a Sri Lankan-Italian co-production.

The film follows a group of young Sri Lankan musicians who illegally immigrate to Italy in the baggage compartment of a bus and about the lost dreams of Sri Lankan youth living during the Sri Lankan civil war.

== Plot ==
The story revolves around a group of young musicians – rock 'n rollers who venerate Bob Marley and wish to become a famous band. But their lives on the lowest rungs of Sri Lankan society, with its poverty and violence, offer them little if no opportunities. Friends returning from Italy talk about the money to be made. But the journey there is not straightforward because it's not legal. The film follows them on their dangerous journey with all its hazards, its comradeship, its tears and laughter, and also death. When in Naples, Italy, the appalling conditions of their day-to-day living, the hard labor, but also the basic human frailties, strengths, loves and hates, are also shown. On returning to Sri Lanka, somehow they seem to be better equipped to survive either in Sri Lanka, or to return to Italy, this time as legal immigrants.

== Cast ==
- Mahendra Perera as Pradeep
- Sangeetha Weeraratne as Princy
- Jackson Anthony as Samson
- Kamal Addararachchi as Maxi
- Sanath Gunathilake as Sagara
- Ravindra Randeniya as Agent KingsLey
- Veena Jayakody as Pradeep's mother
- Sriyantha Mendis as Jude
- W. Jayasiri
- Suvineetha Weerasinghe as Maxi's Mother
- Roger Seneviratne as Michael
- Lakshman Mendis as Premasiri
- Dilhani Ekanayake as Nilanthi
- Pradeep Hettiaratchi as Roger
- Nadie Kammallaweera as Pradeep's Sister
- Channa Perera as Chamara
- Victor Ramanayake as Shantha
- Linton Semage as Raju
- Nawanandana Wijesinghe as Sarath
- Wasantha Wittachchi as Saliya
- Edward Gunawardhana

== Songs ==
- Sudu Andumin performed by Jaya Sri
- Anjaleeka performed by Marians
- Ape Dawasak Enawamai performed by Jaya Sri (written in Sinhala to the melody of "No Woman, No Cry")
- Gantheere Gantheere performed by Kithsiri Jayasekara & Nirosha Virajini
- Salli Pokuru Mille Ahuru performed by Damian Wickramathilaka
