= Sanath Wimalasiri =

Sri Lankan actor and dancer

Dr. Sanath K. Wimalasiri
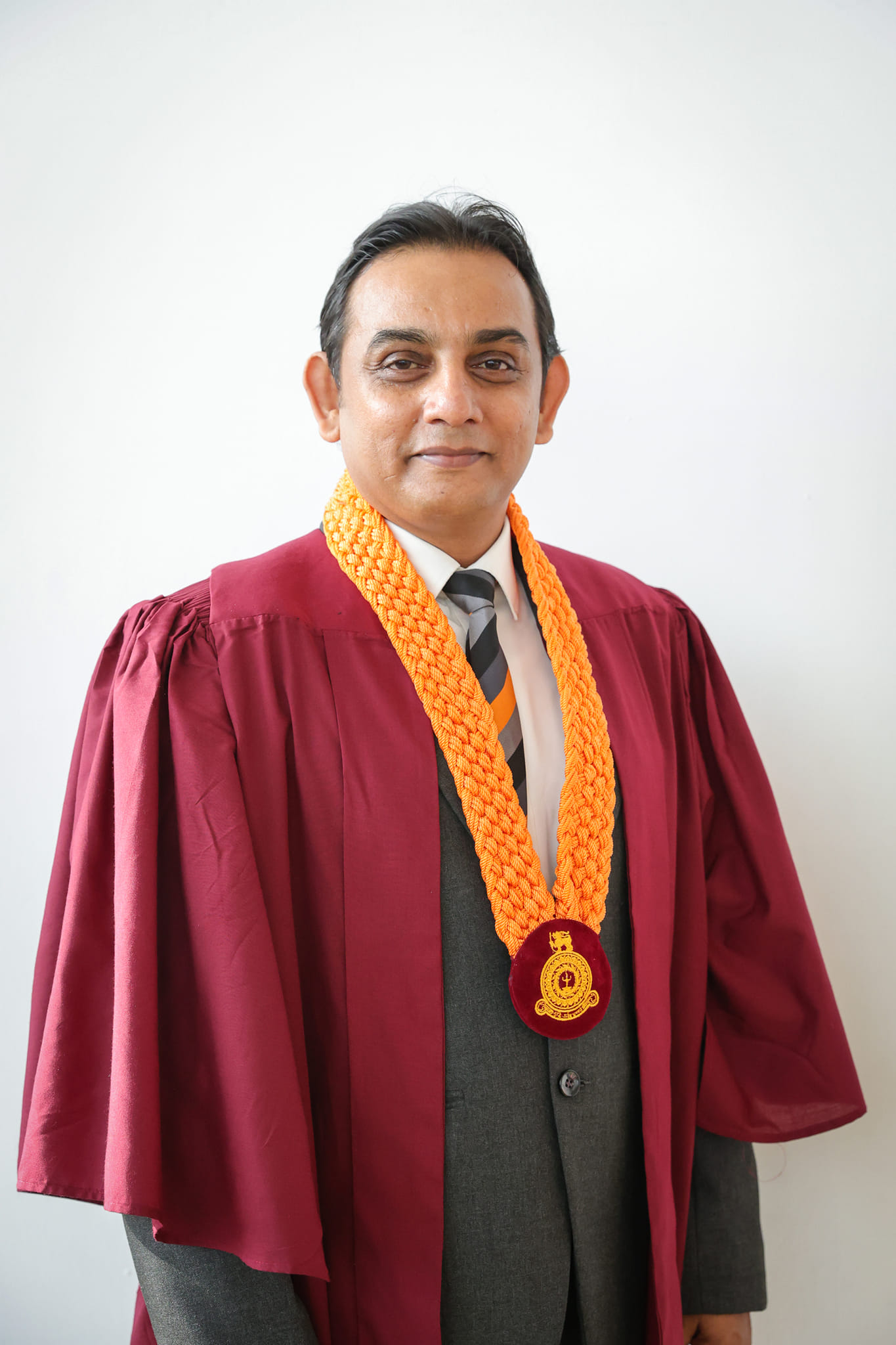
- Dr Sanath Wimalasiri at his PhD Graduation Ceremony
- Born: 8 April 1974 (age 52); Matale, Sri Lanka
- Education: St. Thomas' College, Matale; Kingswood College, Kandy University of Visual and Performing Arts, University of Colombo
- Occupations: Actor, Dramatist, Singer, TV Host, Teacher, Lecturer, Counsellor, Specialist Human Skills Development Trainer
- Years active: 1992–present
- Spouse: Vineetha Erandathi
- Children: 2
- Awards: Best Actor; Best Upcoming Actor

Sanath Wimalasiri (Sinhala: සනත් විමලසිරි, born 8 April 1974) is a Sri Lankan academic and actor in cinema, theatre and television. Recognised for his versatility from drama to comedy, he is also a classically trained Kandyan dancer, singer, television host, teacher, lecturer, counsellor, teacher trainer, and a specialist in human skills development.

== Early life and education ==
Wimalasiri was born on 8 April 1974 in Matale, the son of Johnny Wimalasiri and Prema Thalgahagoda, both retired aesthetic-studies instructors. He was born into the prominent Thalgahagoda family of Matale, a lineage of classically trained Kandyan dancers. His brother, Mahinda, is a Professor at the University of the Visual and Performing Arts and is also active in drama and theatre.

Wimalasiri received his schooling from Weuda Central College, Kurunegala. D.M. Gunarathna Maha Vidyalaya, Matale, St. Thomas' College, Matale, and Kingswood College, Kandy. He earned a Bachelor of Fine Arts (BFA) from the University of the Visual and Performing Arts and a Postgraduate Diploma in Education (Drama and Theatre) from the University of Colombo. He later completed a PhD in psychology at the University of Colombo’s Faculty of Education under the supervision of Chair Professor Manjula Vithanapathirana.

== Personal life ==
Wimalasiri is married to Vineetha Erandathi, a teacher at Sri Jayewardenepura Balika Vidyalaya. The couple have two daughters.

== Acting career ==
He started to act in stage dramas while studying at Kingswood College. He first stage acting came through the play Kethumathi produced by Upali Thilanka Hewage. Under the guidance of his teacher Amitha Rabbidigala, Wimalasiri joined Ediriweera Sarachchandra's theater group. He was selected to play the lead roles in Sarachchandra's critically acclaimed plays such as Maname and Sinhabahu. In 1992, his acted in the serial Nedayo directed by Nalan Mendis in 1996, which marked his entrance to television serials. His maiden cinema acting came through 2003 film Sonduru Dadabima directed by Anura Horatious. His most notable acting came through comedy film Sri Last Chance.

He hosted the television programs Visi Ek Wani Peya and Sarsaraniya telecast on Swarnawahini. Sinal Soyanna Dinanna and Hedakara Hendewa telecast on ITN. He hosted Potawe Isakkaluwa telecast on TV One. He also conducts the programme, Sanath Ekka Jeewithayata Idadenna, an innovative musical event which improves people's prosocial attitudes.

=== Selected stage dramas ===
- Asammathaya
- Ayu Kal
- Bhawa Kadathurawa
- Dall's House
- Dummala Warama
- Elowa Gihin Melowa Aawa
- Guru Tharuwa
- Hasthikantha Manthare
- Honda Hawai Danga Hawai
- Kada Walalu
- Kethumathi
- Kolam Ratak
- Kunu Kanuwak Saha Nommara Dekak
- Last Bus Eke Kathawa
- Lawna Kala Hadiyak
- Lomahansa
- Lysistrata
- Mahasara
- Makarata
- Maname
- Mandela Mandela
- Mati Karaththaya
- Nil Rosa Mala
- Oba Sapekshai
- Pabawathi
- Prathiroopa
- Pematho Jayathi Soko
- Promitheous
- Raja Jalliya
- Raja Man Wahala
- Rathnawali
- Raththaran
- Samath Api Asamath
- Sakunthalaya
- Sihala Wansala
- Sihina Rangahala
- Sinhabahu
- Sinhaya Avilla
- Suddek Oba Amathai
- Sudu Redi Hora
- Thakadombe
- Uththamachara

=== Selected television serials ===
- Amarabandu Rupasinghe
- Anora
- Asani Wesi
- Atawaka Sanda
- Bhavathra
- Bonikko
- Bopath Ella
- Chandi Kumarihami
- Chaya
- Crime Scene
- Dedunu Sihina
- Divithura
- Diya Yata Gini
- Diya Sithuvam
- Eka Kusa Upan Ewun
- Eth Kanda Lihini
- Gimhana Tharanaya
- Girikula
- Googly
- Heeye Manaya
- Hiru Daruwo
- Hithagannama Bari Kathawak
- Hummanaya
- Husmak Langin
- Imaka Pema
- Ingammaaruwa
- Ithin Eta Passe
- Kekiri
- Lansupathiniyo
- Lanvee
- Maada Eyama Wiya
- Maddahana
- Maha Polowa
- Mama Nemei Mama
- Manikkawatha
- Meeduma Obai
- Miringu Ima
- Mudawapu Kirilli
- Muthu Pihatu
- Nedeyo
- Onna Ohe Menna Mehe
- Paradeesaya
- Pingala Danawwa
- Piya Geta Pela
- Pork Veediya
- Ran Mehesi
- Rata Pawula
- Raththaran Neth
- Ridee Siththam
- Sakala Vikala
- Samartha
- Sathi Pooja
- Shoba
- Sihina Piyapath
- Situ Gedara
- Star Sri Lanka Histhanak
- Subha Prarthana
- Suddilage Kathawa
- Sura Pura Sara
- Suwanda Para Nowe
- Swarnapalee
- Thalaya Soyana Geethaya
- Tharupaba
- Thuththiri
- Viyali

== Beyond acting ==
Wimalasiri began his career as a music teacher and later moved into dance instruction, serving as the dance teacher at D. S. Senanayake College. He subsequently shifted his focus to drama and theatre, and is now the drama and theatre teacher at Rahula Girls' School in Malabe. He also serves as an assistant lecturer with the Sri Jayewardenepura Zonal Education Office, an external lecturer at the University of Colombo’s Faculty of Education, an external lecturer at the National Institute of Law, and a consultant in manpower development.

In 2018, Wimalasiri launched Sanath Ekka Jeewithayata Idadenna, a series of musical workshops that blends music with arts-based awareness programs designed to reduce stress, foster pro-social attitudes, and encourage people to find enjoyment and balance through artistic expression.

== Filmography ==
Key
| † | Denotes films that have not yet been released |

| Year | Film | Roles | Ref. |
|---|---|---|---|
| 2003 | Sonduru Dadabima | Kamal Palihakkara 'Dhammika Pitigala' | |
| 2007 | Uppalawanna | Upuli's lover | |
| 2009 | Sir Last Chance | Arti | |
| 2013 | Ira Laga Wadi | Kumara | |
| 2023 | Nattami Army | Surā | |
| TBA | Imaka Pema † | Kumara | |
| TBA | Hela Langa † | | |
| TBA | Uyanata Mal Genna † | | |
| 2006 | Ravana | 'Rishi' | |
| 2025 | Father † | | |
| 2026 | kotu | lesley | |
| 2026 | YK 1 | Doctor | |

== Awards ==
In 1997, Wimalasiri won the award for the Best Actor in Youth Awards Festival and State Drama Festival in 1998. He won the award for the Best Upcoming actor for the role in Rejina at Sumathi Awards. Then, he won the Silver Award for Asani Wesi at SIGNIS awards.

=== State Drama Festival ===
| Year | Nominee / work | Award | Result |
|---|---|---|---|
| 1997 | Oba Sapekshai | Best Actor | Won |
| 1998 | Asammathaya | Best Actor | Won |
| 2014 | Hasthikantha Manthare | Best Actor | |
| 2016 | Raja Man Wahala | Best Actor | Won |
