= Sangeetha Weeraratne =

Sri Lankan actress

- සංගීතා වීරරත්න
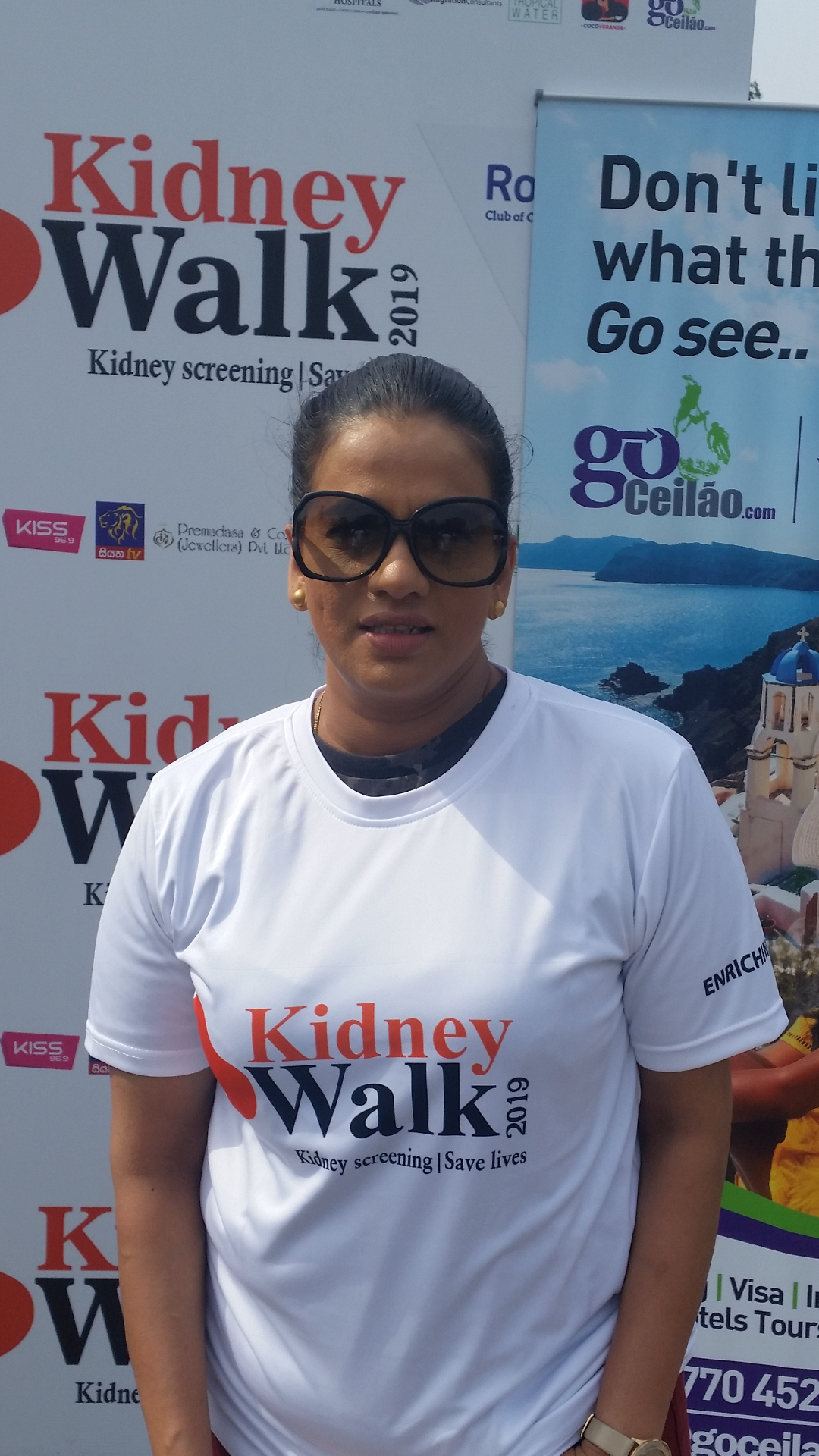
- Weeraratne at Kidney Walk - 2019
- Born: 13 December 1973 (age 52); Panadura, Sri Lanka
- Occupation: Actress
- Years active: 1991–present
- Spouse: Roshantha Kariyapperuma
- Children: 1
- Awards: Sarasaviya Best Actress Award; Sarasaviya Most Popular Actress Award

Diane Hemamali Sangeetha Weeraratne (born December 13, 1973, as (Sinhala:සංගීතා වීරරත්න) is a Sri Lankan film actress in the Sri Lankan cinema. She made her debut as a sixteen-year-old with Roy de Silva's It's a Matter of Time opposite Kamal Addararachchi in 1990. However, she earned immense popularity only after performing in H.D. Premaratne's Saptha Kanya, also opposite Kamal Addararachchi in 1993. It was a huge success and she won the Sarasaviya Best Newcomer Award that year. She has acted in over 50 movies.

== Personal life ==
Sangeetha Weeraratne was born the second daughter of cinematographer Timothy Weeraratne and his wife Daisy. She had her primary education at St. John's Girls' School Panadura and then moved on to Methodist College, Colombo for her secondary studies.

She has an elder sister, Nayanatara Weeraratne who currently lives in Australia. Sangeetha married to a businessman, Roshantha Kariyapperuma in December 2002. Her husband Roshantha Kariyapperuma owns and operates the company Voice of Asia Network (Pvt) Ltd which is the largest Media Network in Sri Lanka.

== Career ==
Sangeetha made her debut in to the silver screen through the renowned director Roy de Silva with his film It's a Matter of Time in 1991. She had the rare fortune of mingling with some of the popular stars of the time, such as Malini Fonseka, Vijaya Kumaratunga, Gamini Fonseka and Roy de Silva.

In 2001, Weeraratne won the Sarasaviya Best Actress Award for her role as Guneris' wife in Aswesuma directed by Bennet Ratnayake. She was also crowned the Sarasaviya Most Popular Actress for three consecutive years from 2001 to 2003.

Some films where she played memorable dramatic roles include Saptha Kanya, Nomiyena Minisun, Maruthaya, Duwata Mawaka Misa, Dorakada Marawa, Kinihiriya Mal, Aswesuma, Salelu Warama and Dheewari. She also appeared in few blockbuster comedy movies such as Dawal Migel Ra Daniyel series and Sapata Dukata Sunny as well.

In 2000, she presented the television documentary program Gedara Dora, which was based on Architecture, Interior Design and Landscaping. It was telecast Rupavahini - 1 at 9.30 p.m. on every Tuesday.'

She launched her first production with the film, Sewwandi directed by Vasantha Obeysekera in 2006. Her latest dramatic film is Uppalawanna directed by Prof. Sunil Ariyaratne, where she plays the role of Upuli and later the bhikkhuni, Uppalawanna was also critically acclaimed.

In 2012, a vision for transforming Sri Lanka's beauty pageant landscape became reality when alongside Shereen Kumaranantunge and Dhananjaya Bandara, Sangeetha established Modelshop. This innovative company took on the prestigious responsibility of organizing both the Miss World Sri Lanka and Mr World Sri Lanka pageants. Over the past decade, Modelshop has consistently elevated the standards of pageant organization in Sri Lanka, bringing international recognition and credibility to the nation's beauty and talent competitions. Through their dedicated efforts and professional approach, the company has successfully guided numerous contestants to represent Sri Lanka on the global stage, while maintaining a commitment to discovering and nurturing diverse talent from across the island nation.she started

In 2021, she appeared in the Raffealla Fernando Celebrity Calendar along with many other Sri Lankan celebrities.

== Filmography ==
Since her first film in 1991, she has acted in more than 40 commercially successful films.

- No. denotes the Number of Sri Lankan film in the Sri Lankan cinema.

List of Sangeetha Weeraratne film credits
Year	No.	Title	Role
1991		It's a Matter of Time	Sheril
1993	781	Yasasa	
1993	782	Saptha Kanya	Deepthi
1993	788	Lassanai Balanna	Inspector Menaka
1994	812	Aragalaya	Achala
1994	793	Landuni Oba Devaganaki	Teacher
1994	794	Nomiyena Minisun	
1994	795	Rajawansen Ekek	Missy
1995	821	Wasana Wewa	Kanchana
1995	831	Maruthaya	Elder daughter
1995	833	Chandiyage Putha	Vishaka
1996	846	Bodyguard	
1996	847	Raththaran Malli	Rani
1996	849	Naralowa Holman	Durga 'Baby' Madanayake 'Shiromala' / Donna Juliana 'Julie'
1996	853	Hitha Hondanam Waradin Na	Lawyer
1997	908	Pavuru Valalu	Lily
1997	871	Puthuni Mata Wasana	Rupika
1997	873	Surayo Wedakarayo	
1997	880	Mahamera Usata	
1997		Mother Teresa: In the Name of God's Poor	Sunitha
1997	888	Ninja Sri Lanka	
1998	894	Re Daniel Dawal Migel 1	Mudhuri
1998	895	Sathutai Kirula Ape	Piumi
1998	904	Dorakada Marawa	Subhasini 'Subha' Fernando
1999	917	Ayadimi Sama	Namali
1999	912	Bahu Bharya	Theja
2000	930	Undaya	Sarala Paliwardhana
2000	932	Re Daniel Dawal Migel 2	Madhuri
2001	953	Kinihiriya Mal	Sanduni / 'Jean'
2001	959	Jonsun and Gonsun	Rathnayake Mudiyanselage Dingiri Menika and Durga
2001	957	Aswesuma	Menika
2002	990	Salelu Warama	Priyanka
2002	989	Onna Babo	Shanu's mother
2002	991	Love 2002	
2003		Mother Teresa	Sister Christina
2003	1006	Sepata Dukata Sunny	Sempamutti Arachchige Tara Kumarihami
2005	1050	Guerilla Marketing	Rangi
2006	1069	Nilambare	Madhu
2006	1080	Sewwandi	Damayanthi / Kumari
2007	1083	Mister Dhana Rina	
2007	1086	Sankranthi	Pam
2007	1090	Uppalavanna	Uppalavanna maniyo
2010	1136	Kshema Bhoomi	Younger Daughter
2011	1154	Challenges	Competition organizer
2011	1163	Dheewari	Valli
2013	1199	Doni	Malathi Gunawardena
2013	1186	Anithya	Sherine
2016	1263	Hero Nero	Herself
2017	1277	Nimnayaka Hudekalawa	Thaaraka
2018	1310	Gharasarapa	Dr. Vidya Doraiappa
2021		Kawuruth Danne Na	Politician Theja Madugalle
TBD		Adventures of Ricky Deen	Lady Godiva
TBD		Jeewa	

== Awards ==
She is a recipient of many state awards in many times for many categories.

=== Sarasaviya Film Festival ===
Year	Nominee / work	Award	Result
1993	Saptha Kanya	Best Newcomer	Won
1994	Nomiyena Minissu	Best Actress	Won
1995	Maruthaya	Merit Award	Won
2002	Maruthaya	Most Popular Actress	Won
2002	Aswesuma	Best Actress	Won

=== Presidential Film Festival ===
Year	Nominee / work	Award	Result
1999	Pawuru Walalu	Best Supporting Actress	Won

=== Critic Awards ===
Year	Nominee / work	Award	Result
1996	Dorakada Marawa	Best Actress	Won

=== OCIC Awards ===
Year	Nominee / work	Award	Result
1998	Dorakada Marawa	Best Actress	Won

=== Other Festivals ===
Year	Nominee / work	Award	Result
2000	Junior Chamber of Arts of Sri Lanka	Outstanding young personality	Won
2001	Aswesuma	Best Actress	Won
2001	Aswesuma	Most Popular Actress	Won
