= Nalaka Vithanage =

Sri Lankan filmmaker

Nalaka Withanage නාලක විතානගේ
- Born: 16 February 1982 (age 44); Colombo
- Education: Nalanda College Colombo UNITECH INTERNATIONAL, Auckland
- Occupation: Film Director
- Years active: 2004–present
- Height: 6 ft
- Children: Uththara Iduwari Withanage
- Father: Bandula Withanage
- Relatives: Yashoda Wimaladharma (Cousin)

Nalaka Vithanage is a filmmaker of Sri Lankan cinema, theater and television. He is the son of popular dramatist Bandula Withanage.

== Personal life ==
Nalaka was born on 16 February. He was educated at Nalanda College Colombo and has been keenly interested and involved with his passion for stage and teledrama creations and film making while at school. He completed his higher studies in commerce and business studies. In 2001 he went New Zealand for further studies. He returned Sri Lanka in 2004.

His father Bandula Vithanage was a renowned dramatist in Sri Lanka who had a career that spanned for more than five decades. Vithanage is one of the earliest pillars of Sri Lankan art and drama, where he is the pioneer to introduce Shakespearean theater to Sri Lankan theater with several plays such as Veniciye Velenda, Macbeth, Twelfth Night, Hamlet and Romeo and Juliet. He died on 1 September 2014 at Colombo National Hospital at the age of 73. Nalaka has one sister, Vajirakumari Vithanage.

His cousin sister Yashoda Wimaladharma is a popular actress in Sri Lanka cinema, theater and television.

== Career ==
During his higher education, Nalaka joined the stage plays produced by his father such as Veniceye Velenda, Senehebara Dolly and Romaya Gini Gani. In 2004, he made his maiden stage drama production Rathri Bojanaya. The play was based on the French play ‘Don’t Dress for dinner’ of Mark Camollte and translated by his father. Then he made three more stage dramas: Kasi Malla (2006), Upanda Maranaya (2009), and Breaking News. The play Kasi Mallaentered last round of the State Drama festival in that year and won a Merit award for the Best Actor. Meanwhile he also made the script of the television serials Dekona Gini and Allapu Gedara which were aired in Swarnavahini.

In 2012, he made his debut cinema direction Anithya, a romantic drama. In the same year, Nalaka made the post-war thriller film Roopantharana, which was later released in 2014. In 2013, he started his third cinema direction with the title Agni Warsha. However, after completing the shooting, the film was renamed as Nilanjana. Shooting was completed in 2014. The film was screened in 2017.

In 2017, he made the romantic film Sarungal which was screened at the MPI theaters in 2018. The film received mixed reviews from critics. In 2019, he directed the action film Ethalaya where he was also the screenwriter of the film. The film was released in 2020 in the midst of Corona outbreak.

== Directed filmography ==
Year	Film	Ref.
2013	Anithya	
2014	Rupantharana	
2017	Nilanjana	
2018	Sarungal	
2020	Ethalaya	
TBD	Hola	
