= Morris Wijesinghe =

Sri Lankan singer (1941–2020)

Morris Wijesinghe මොරිස් විජේසිංහ
- Born: Morris Denzil Bernard Wijesinghe; 16 October 1941; Mount Lavinia, Sri Lanka
- Died: 31 August 2020 (aged 78)
- Other names: Bhanu, Barney, Maurice
- Education: St. Peter's College, Bambalapitiya
- Occupations: Singer, musician
- Spouse: Marina Vinodani Perera (m. 1969)
- Children: 2
- Awards: Best Teledrama Singer
- Musical career
- Genres: Pop; soul; rhythm and blues
- Instruments: Vocals, guitar
- Years active: 1970–2016
- Labels: Nilwala; MEntertainment

Morris Denzil Bernard 'Barney' Wijesinghe, (16 October 1941 – 31 August 2020 as මොරිස් විජේසිංහ [Sinhala]), popularly known as Morris Wijesinghe, was a Sri Lankan musician and playback singer. One of the popular pop artists in 1980s of Sri Lankan music with a career spanning more than four decades, Wijesinghe has sung several popular songs including Doowillen Wathsunu Thawara, Nil Ahas Thale Aage, Oba Enna and Peradiga Ahase.

== Personal life ==
He was born on 16 October 1941 in Mount Lavinia as the second in a family of seven. He was educated at St. Peter's College, Bambalapitiya. His main hobby was enjoying the best opera songs in the world. After school times, he worked in a welding industry and then in Bata footwear company and Car Mart company.

He was married to longtime partner Marina Vinodani Perera who is from Molligoda, Wadduwa in 1969. She was educated at Holy Family Convent, Bambalapitiya and then in St. Bridget's Convent. Marina was employed at the Intercontinental Hotel in Colombo as a telephone operator for 32 consecutive years. At the time of her retirement, she had won the award for Best Telephone Activist in the entire island. The couple have one daughter, Manori and one son, Mevan.

Wijesighe died on 31 August 2020 at the age of 78. Within 24 hours of the same day, he was cremated in the Mount Lavinia Public Cemetery and his ashes were spread according to his last will and testament.

== Career ==
He learned music under Fr. Merciline Jayakody during school times and took part in two operettas staged at St. Peter's: 'The Trial by Jury' and 'Maritana'. During school times, he started to sing western songs of Sunil Shantha, C.T. Fernando and Neville Fernando and also joined church choir. Later, he started singing career under the master T.S. Peiris who worked at Sri Lanka Broadcasting Corporation (SLBC).

Since 1970, he sang popular Italian, Spanish and French songs and was a talented singer who was praised by foreigners. He signed a six-month contract with the German band "Lubeck". He is the only Sri Lankan singer who left the country to sing German, Swiss and New Zealand songs. Meanwhile, Wijesinghe has sung in several five star hotels in Sri Lanka since 1970 such as Ramada, Grand Pegaus Reef, Cinaman Grand, Brown Beach, Mount Laviniya, Galle Face and Bentota Beach. He was also a member of the 'Colombo Light Opera Society' where he met Lyle Godridge. Meanwhile in 1984, he had a contract to sing at the Colombo Hilton for three years, at 'Ilponte'. With that, Wijesinghe became a professional singer at the 'Italian Night' at Mt. Lavinia hotel.

In 1981, Wijesinghe entered the film industry as a playback singer. During this time, he met Premasiri Khemadasa under the guidance of musician Ranjith Lal. He sang the song "Milana Ma Denethe" for the film Induta Mal Mitak directed by Sugathapala Senarath Yapa, which was his maiden playback singing. The song was composed by Dharmasiri Gamage. Since then he has sung in several films to the musical compositions of Khemadasa. Then he sang "Duvillen Wathsunu Thavara" for Saptha Kanya and "Nil Ahas Thale Aage" for Mahagedara which was composed by Navaratne Gamage and written by Upul Shantha Sannasgala. His song 'Mathura Savanata Romeo Kumaruta' for the film Julietge Bhumikawa became highly popular. Wijesinghe's most popular film song "Duvillen Wathsunu Thavara" was the song composed by Wasantha Kumara Kobawaka, who sang under the music direction of Rohana Weerasinghe in the film 'Saptha Kanya'.

The song "Sihinen Ge Suwanda Adare" was sung by Wijesinghe and Damayanthi Jayasuriya for the film Wathsala Akka where the song was written by Sarath Gunaratne, the director of the film and music by Carlo Wijesiri. The song "Asapiya Salamin Hinahemin" sung by Wijesinghe for the teledrama Kula Kumariya directed by Burmin Lyle was written by Ivan Kiriella.

In the early 1990s, Wijesinghe was invited for a role in the popular teledrama series Nedeyo directed by Nalan Mendis. He initially refused the invitation, but then played a sub-lead role in the teledrama brilliantly. In the teledrama, he played a young man 'Ivan' who had fun playing the guitar. However, he did not sing a song there. He won the Presidential award for the Best singer for the serial Samanalee. He also sang the theme songs for television serials Wes Muhunu and Dekethi Muwahatha.

In 2001, he won the Sumathi Best Teledrama Singer Award for the song "Peradiga Ahase" in the television serial Dekethi Muwahatha directed by Dayaratne Ratagedara. One of his close friends, Navaratne Gamage composed many songs in his last years of the career including the popular hit "Oba Enna" written by Upul Shantha Sannasgala. Some of his other popular songs in late years are; "His Ahasa Unath" with Mariazelle Goonetilleke, "Naukawa Nim Walalla" written by Dr. Ajantha Ranasinghe, and "Sandawathata Sande" with Indika Upamali. His last song was "Sigiriye Sinhaya" written by Ranjith Korale. The song "Sunilvan Walakulin Pavela" sung for the film Adara Kathawa directed by Chandran Ratnam was recorded but it was not used in the film.

== Filmography ==
Year	Film	Role	Ref.
1980	Paara Dige	Playback singer	
1980	Hansa Vilak	Playback singer	
1981	Induta Mal Mitak	Playback singer	
1982	Mahagedara	Playback singer	
1983	Sivuranga Sena	Playback singer	
1985	Rejina	Playback singer	
1985	Wathsala Akka	Playback singer	
1993	Saptha Kanya	Playback singer	
1998	Julietge Bhumikawa	Playback singer	
2004	Aadaraneeya Wassaanaya	Playback singer	
2006	Samaara	Playback singer	
