= Sarath Namalgama =

Sri Lankan actor (1958–2019)

Sarath Namalgama සරත් නාමල්ගම
- Born: Sarath Namalgama; November 21, 1958; Colombo, Sri Lanka
- Died: March 13, 2019 (aged 60); Kalubowila, Sri Lanka
- Education: Carey College, Colombo; Isipathana College
- Occupations: Actor, producer
- Years active: 1990–2019

Sarath Namalgama (born 21 November 1958 – died 13 March 2019 as සරත් නාමල්ගම) [Sinhala]), was an actor in Sri Lankan cinema, stage drama and television as well as a television producer and philanthropist. He has contributed in various fields of art as a drama film voice actor, commercial presenter, TV presenter and organizer of local and foreign musical shows.

== Personal life ==
He was born on 21 November 1958 in Colombo-Belmont Street, Sri Lanka as the only son in a family with four siblings. He completed education from Carey College, Colombo and at the Isipathana College. He has one elder sister and two younger sisters.

During school times, he learned dancing from Chitrasena-Vajira Kalayathanaya for one year. After completing his schooling, he got a job at the People's Bank, where he completed a 16-year-stint in the People's Bank.

He was married to fellow actress Maneesha Shyamali since 2002 until his death.

He died on 13 March 2019 at the age of 60 while receiving treatment at Kalubowila Hospital for a sudden heart attack. His remains were kept at No. 64 Udahamulla, Nugegoda at his residence for public respect. Funeral took place at Kohuwela Cemetery on 16 March 2019.

== Career ==
One day during his school days, he met popular actress Chandra Kaluarachchi by chance at the Sudarshi Hall in Colombo. Then he had the opportunity to watch the recording of the radio drama Muwan Pelessa. In 1990, he joined the teledrama production as a co-producer of the teledrama Purnima directed by Kusumchandra Gamage and also contributed as an actor.

In 1992, he started producing DVDs for the international market under production outfit titled "SNT Productions" and released two DVDs. The first teledrama production was Pata Pata Heenayak directed by Mohan Niyas. Then his second DVD was the television serial Adaravanthayo directed by Eranga Senaratne. In the serial, he played the role of 'doctor'. In 1993, Namalgama worked as a news anchor for the Independent Television Network. In 1998, he made his maiden cinema appearance with the film Dorakada Marawa directed by Wasantha Obesekere. In 1999, Namalgama acted in R. R. Samarakoon's stage play Ahasin Vetunu Minissu which was also staged in the United States of America and Korea.

His first teledrama production was the teleserial Kiri Ammavaru directed by Anura Madhava Jayasekara. In the serial, he also played the popular role 'Wasantha'. In 2002 he produced the teledrama Ira Handa Pamula which was telecast by Sri Lanka Rupavahini Corporation on Christmas Day. He later played the main role in six teledramas including, Ukusso, Siridev Wimana, Sandavathaka Varuṇa, Kethumathi and Kedelle Kurullo. Apart from that, Namalgama was also the Assistant Secretary of the Vehicle Importers Association of Sri Lanka. He also starred in all the telenovelas he produced. In 2006, he waon the Best Teledrama award at Sumathi Awards for his production Sihinayak Pata Patin.

Meanwhile, he also produced two films: Gini Siluva and Rosa Kusuma Mage, both halted in production stage and got a court injunction for Gini Siluva. Then he acted in the films Kalu Sudu Mal and Parasathu Vila with supportive roles. In 2002, he co-produced the film Rosa Patikki with Dinali Roshantha Senarathne and played a supportive role. In the same year, he appeared in the serial Piyageta Pela directed by Chandraratne Mapitigama and Siri Dev Wimana directed by Sudath Senaratne. His production, 'Susie': Susanthika Jayasinghe's autobiography was not screened due to legal issues. He co-starred with his wife Manisha in the Indian-Sri Lankan co-production teleserial Kaasi.

In his late years, he has been involved in the 'Heal and Feel' welfare program and the social work of pleasing the elderly living in nursing homes.

=== Selected television serials ===
- Adaravanthayō
- Bāla Lamāvaru
- Diya Sevaṇæli
- Ira Handa Pāmula
- Kædællē Kurullō
- Kēthumathī Raja Dahana
- Kiri Ammavaru
- Māyā Aevaniyu
- Patinivarā
- Piyageṭa Peḷa
- Piya Senehasa
- Samanalayā
- Sandavathaka Varuṇa
- Sihinayak Pāṭa Pāṭa
- Siri Dev Wimana
- Ukussō

== Filmography ==
Year	Film	Role	Ref.
1998	Dorakada Marawa		
2002	Kalu Sudu Mal		
2010	Rosa Patikki		
