= St. Thomas' College, Matale =

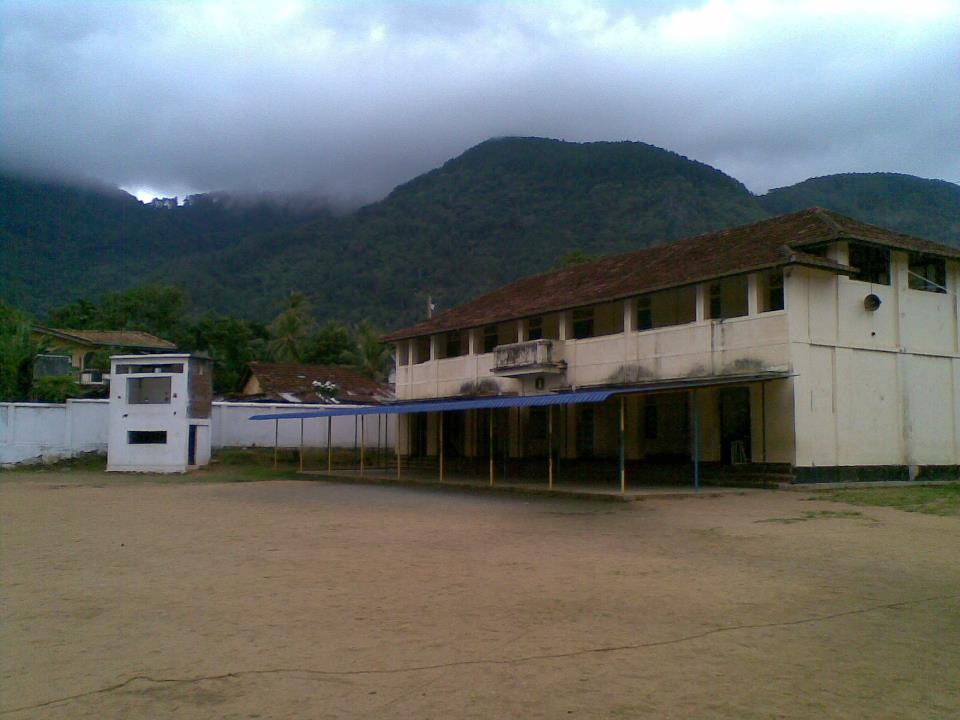
- School playground and sports building

Location
- Matale; Matale, Central province Sri Lanka
- 7°28′13″N 80°37′28″E

Information
- Type: Public
- Motto: Animo Et Fide (Courage & Faith)
- Religious affiliation: Christianity
- Established: 10 August 1873; 152 years ago
- Founder: Catholic Church
- Principal: Dhammika Hewawasam
- Staff: 140+
- Grades: Class 6 – 13
- Gender: Male
- Age: 11 to 19
- Enrollment: 2,000+
- Colours: Gold and double blue
- Alumni: Old Thomians
- Website: www.stcmatale.lk

St. Thomas' College, Matale (Sinhala: මාතලේ ශාන්ත තෝමස් විද්‍යාලය), or (STC), is a boys-only secondary school located in Matale, Sri Lanka.

== History ==
The school was established in 1873 in the verandah of a small mud-and-wattle church. The first class of students included 75 boys and 12 girls. In 1876, the school was split into separate boys and girls schools by Rev. Fr. Aloysius J. M. Marrer. The headmaster of the boys' school was Leo de Silva, and the leader of the girls' school was Rosa Perera. The girls' school was named St. Agnes Convent School, which is now known as St. Thomas Girls' School.

In January 1880, a secular priest (also known as a diocesan priest), Rev. Fr. Pius Fernando, from Negombo, arrived at the school. Fernando spent half a century of his priestly life in Matale and died in 1930.

In 1901, the Robinson Memorial Hall was built on land donated by John Croos of Negombo. In 1904, Joseph Gregory Perera, a former student of the school, joined as a pupil-teacher and retired in 1946. He was popularly known as “Joseph Master”. During that time the headmasters were J. M. Direckse, A. S. Scharnignivel, L. D’w. Jayasighe, C. J. Rodrigo and Charles Robinson. Robinson was appointed as headmaster on 1 September 1923, retiring in 1958.

Cadet Platoon (Junior) was inaugurated on 10 December 1938 under the charge of J. B. Madasekara. E. A. Perusinghe, who was a Lieutenant, took over cadeting. The Scout Troop 3rd Matale was inaugurated in 1935 with F. de S. Gunawardena as Scout Master and S. B. Pamunuwa as his assistant.

When Robinson retired, he was succeeded by George Denlow, who left the school after a short stint and was replaced by B. J. Perera.

== Education ==
There are more than 2,000 students studying in the college (July 2014). They have many facilities of studying leading to qualifications such as grade 5 scholarship exams, O/L and A/L.

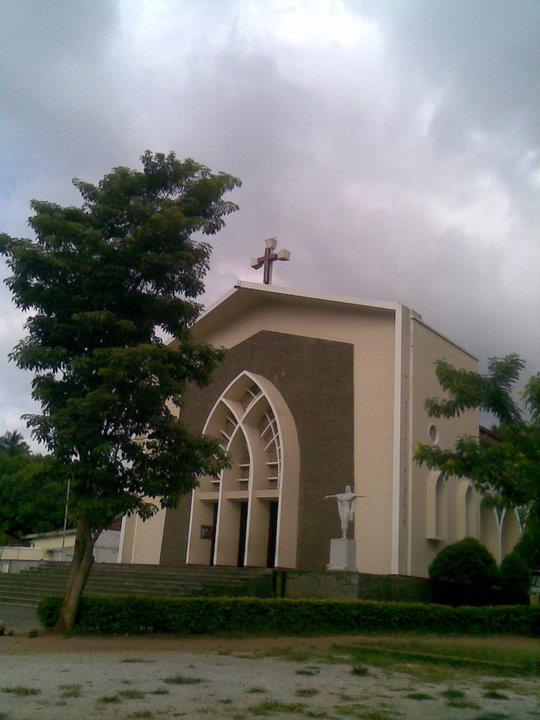
Matale St.Thomas' church in front of the school

== Past principals ==
Name	Entered office	Departed office
Charles Robinson	1923	1958
D. Aidan de Silva	1958	1962
W. B. Gopallawa	1962	1965
A. J. Wijesinghe	1965	1985
Upali Weragama	1988	1996
J. H. M. W. Ranjith	1997	2000
E. M. P. Ekanayake	2001	2005
Dampiya Wanasinghe	2005	2016
K. A. J. Kulasuriya	2016	2018
D. M. W Dissanayake	2019	2020
Dhammika Hewawasam	2020	present

== Houses ==
House Name	House Colour
Austin	
Bede	
Clement	
Pius	

== Competition ==
The school's main rival is the Science College, Matale. Matches between the two are often called the "Battle of the Golds".

== Notable alumni ==
The school has produced many notable persons who are well known throughout the country.

Name	Notability	Reference
Don Spater Senanayake	Entrepreneur and philanthropist	
Kingsley Jayasekera	Actor, singer	
Lakdasa Kodituwakku	Inspector General of Police (1998 – 2002)	
Dayan Witharana	Singer, photographer (1982 – present)	
Shavendra Silva	Commander of the Army (Sri Lanka) (2019 – 2022); Chief of Defence Staff (2022 – 2024)	
Chanaka Welegedara	Test cricket player (2007 – 2014)	
Sanath Wimalasiri	Actor, Dramatist (1994 – present)	
Hemal Ranasinghe	Model, actor (2009 – present)	
Lahiru Madushanka	ODI, T20I cricket player (2017–2021)	
Damith Wijayathunga	Model, actor (2015 – present)	
Ruwantha Kellepotha	First-class cricketer	

== See also ==
- List of schools in Sri Lanka
