= Asani Warsha =

- Sinhala: අසනි වර්ෂා
- Directed by: Vasantha Obeysekera
- Written by: Vasantha Obeysekera
- Starring: Jagath Chamila; Kamal Addararachchi; Meena Kumari
- Cinematography: Jayanath Gunawardena
- Edited by: Ravindra Guruge
- Music by: Premasiri Khemadasa
- Production company: EAP Films
- Distributed by: EAP Theatres
- Release date: 1 January 2005
- Country: Sri Lanka
- Language: Sinhala

Asani Warsha (Sinhala: අසනි වර්ෂා) is a 2007 Sri Lankan Sinhala drama film directed by Vasantha Obeysekera and produced by Soma Edirisinghe for EAP Films. It stars Jagath Chamila, Kamal Addararachchi and Meena Kumari in lead roles along with Sanath Gunathilake and Mahendra Perera. Music composed by Premasiri Khemadasa.

== Cast ==
- Jagath Chamila as Pradeep Godakumbura
- Kamal Addararachchi as Sanjeewa Godakumbura
- Sanath Gunathilake as Minister Sirimanne
- Meena Kumari as Ruwanthi 'Renuka' Gunasekara
- Veena Jayakody as Grandmother
- Mahendra Perera as Patrick
- Semini Iddamalgoda as Kanthi
- Janaki Wijerathne as Nayani
- Nilu Hettihewa
- Ranmini Lorensuhewa as Kanthi's daughter
- Kasun Chamara as Alex
- Sampath Jayaweera
