= Soma Edirisinghe =

Sri Lankan businesswoman

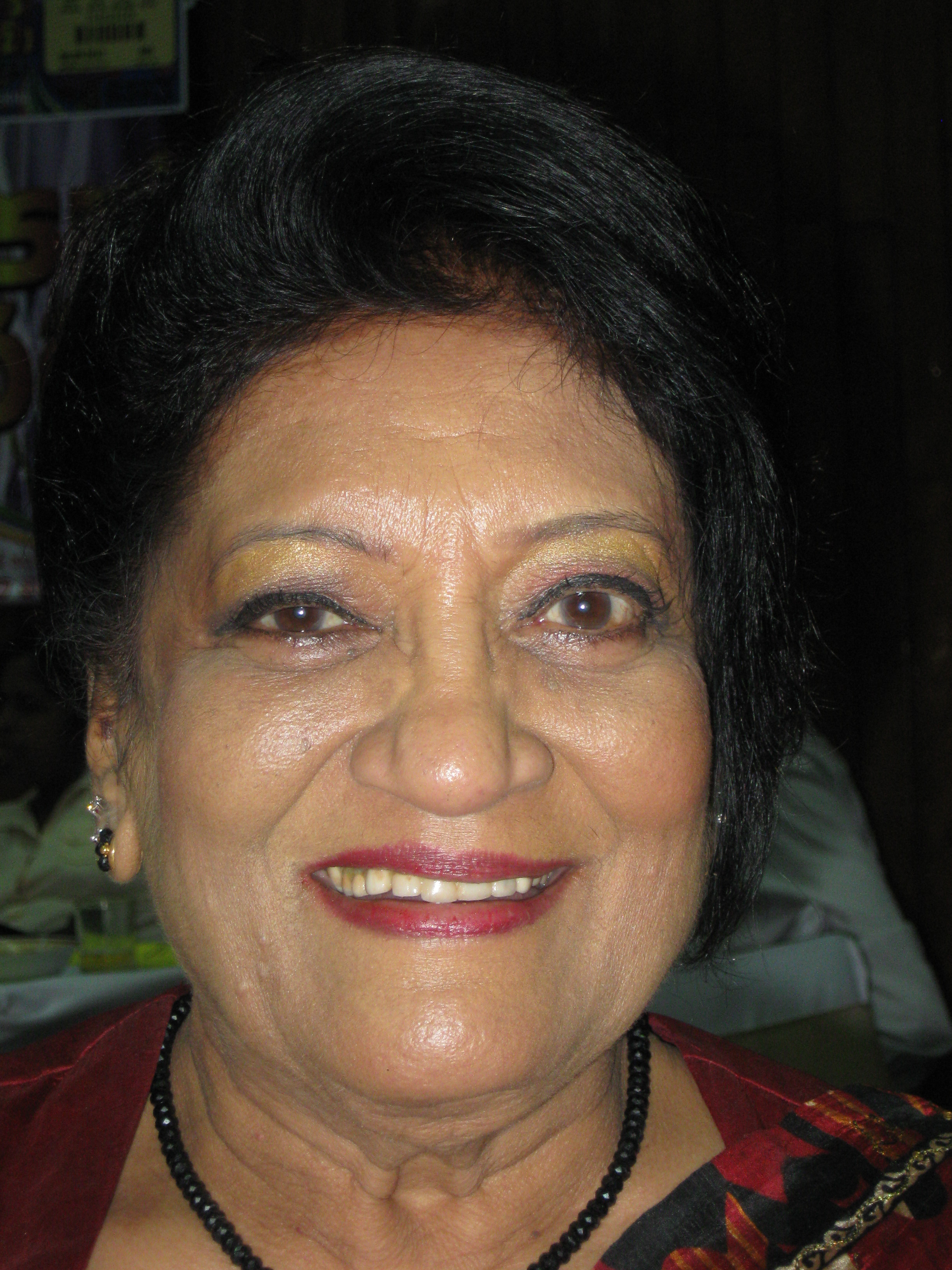
- Born: 5 July 1939; Meegoda, Sri Lanka
- Died: 5 November 2015 (aged 76); Colombo, Sri Lanka
- Known for: Chairperson of EAP Holdings
- Title: Deshabandu, Deshashakthi , Lion
- Spouse: E.A.P Edirisinghe
- Website: janasarana.org

Soma Edirisinghe (Sinhala: සෝමා එදිරිසිංහ; 5 July 1939 – 5 November 2015) was a Sri Lankan corporate executive, film producer, philanthropist and social worker. She was born in Meegoda, Sri Lanka on 5 July 1939 to a family of nine daughters, and died on 5 November 2015 at a private hospital in Colombo. She was married to EAP Edirisinghe and they had four children: three sons, Jeewaka, Nalaka and Asanka, and a daughter, Deepa.

== Early life ==
Edirisnghe was the daughter of Charles Perera, a farmer; her mother was a housewife. She attended Meegoda Government School, Dharmapala Vidyalaya Pannipitaya and Samudradevi School in Nugegoda (St.john's College), a suburb of Colombo.

EAP Edirisinghe initially proposed marriage to one of her sisters, however the offer was declined.

== Business career ==
Her career began in 1974 with the sudden death of her husband, EAP Edirisinghe, the founder of EAP Holdings. Friends and family expected her to sell the business due to her lack of knowledge and experience in the commercial world. Instead, however, she became the company's chairperson and expanded into a number of new fields. The organization now consists of 25 subsidiaries and is one of the largest business conglomerates in Sri Lanka. It deals in broadcasting and telecasting, financial services, insurance, production and exhibition of films, retailing gold jewellery, pawning services, housing, land sales, hotels, and importing and retailing of vehicles.

EAP's media arm is considered a leader in the Sri Lankan industry, owning two television stations and three radio stations including Swarnawahini, Shree FM, RanOne and E FM.

== Filmography ==
Edirisinghe expanded the family business into film-making and produced 20 movies in Sinhala cinema

- Dhawala Pushpaya (1994)
- Seilama (1995) - received Sarasaviya Award for Best Film
- Visidela (1997)
- Re Daniel Dawal Migel 1 (1998)
- Re Daniel Dawal Migel 2 (2000)
- Rosa Wasanthe (2001) - received Sarasaviya Award for Most Popular Film
- Kinihiriya Mal (2001)
- Salelu Warama (2002)
- Yakada Pihatu (2003)
- Ra Daniel Dawal Migel 3 (2004)
- Ira Madiyama (2005) - received Sarasaviya Award and Presidential Award for Best Film
- One Shot (2005)
- Asani Warsha (2005)
- Hiripoda Wassa (2006)
- Samaara (2007)
- Tharaka Mal (2007)
- Heart FM the film (2008)
- Sir Last Chance (2009)
- Siri Daladagamanaya (2014)
- Ko Mark No Mark (2014)

== Philanthropy ==
Edirisinghe began her philanthropic work in 1961, during a devastating flood in the provinces of Sri Lanka. She joined a group of celebrities and personalities to bring relief supplies to those affected. She later stated that she became increasingly involved in charity work as a way of dealing with the loneliness of losing her husband.

=== Lions Club ===
Edirisinghe joined the Lions Club of Thimbirigasyaya on its inception in 1974. She became the first lady to be elected to the position of District Governor in 2003–04. Also, she was elected to serve as the District Governor of International Association of Lions Club District 306 C2 at its Annual Convention held in Colombo on 18 March 2003.

=== Janasarana Foundation ===
Edirisinghe was the founder and the chairperson of the Janasarana Foundation, an independent non-profit organisation that revolves round helping the underprivileged sectors of society. Some of the projects she initiated include Chuo Maithree Pre-school, the Suwanetha Mobile Eye Care Clinic, the Punarjeewa Fund for assisting the poor to undergo heart surgery, upgrading underdeveloped hospitals, scholarships and assistance to under privileged school children and underdeveloped schools, helping destitute families and those displaced by war to recover, building houses for those affected by natural disasters such as floods, drought and the tsunami and most recently setting up the Suwanetha Lions Eye Hospital.

The foundation has also donated 300,000 pairs of spectacles to needy people, and mentored new entrepreneurs into their first businesses.

== Honours and awards ==
- Deshabandu National Award & Gold Medal for outstanding humanitarian services to the nation in January 2004
- Deshashakthi National award for outstanding humanitarian services to the nation presented by the then Prime Minister of Sri Lanka Mahinda Rajapakse in 2005.
- Excellency Award 2006 presented by the Society of Sri Lanka Justices of Peace and Human Rights Organization and Sulabh International Academy of Environmental Sanitation, New Delhi, India. Sanitation New Delhi and the Society of the Sri Lanka Justices of the Peace for humanitarian services.
- Conferred Honorary Doctorate for Entrepreneurship and Social Service from the Open University of Sri Lanka in 2005
- Unparalleled feat of being awarded 'Lion of the Year' on four occasions. (1994/95, 1995/96, 1997/98, 1999/2000)
- Special Award of Appreciation – Presented by the SAARC Women's Chamber of Commerce for Building Bridges of Friendship in 2001
- The People's Award 2007 – "People's Social Worker of the Year" – presented by the Sri Lanka Institute of Marketing in recognition of outstanding services rendered to the community
- Sarasaviya Award for the Best Film 1995 "Seylama"
- Sarasaviya Award for the Best Film 1996 "Re Deniyal Daval Migel 2”
- Sarasaviya Award for the Most Popular Film 2001 "Rosa Wasanthaya"
- Sarasaviya Award for the Best Film 2005 "Ira Madiyama"
- Award for "Excellent Social Worker by Empowering Women in the Society”, 2011

== Autobiography ==
In 2011, Edirisinghe published her autobiography, Memoirs of a Glorious Life.
