= Saptha Kanya (film) =

- DVD poster
- Directed by: H.D. Premaratne
- Written by: H.D. Premaratne
- Produced by: H.D. Premaratne
- Starring: Kamal Addararachchi; Sangeetha Weeraratne
- Cinematography: Suminda Weerasinghe
- Edited by: Elmo Haliday
- Music by: Rohana Weerasinghe
- Distributed by: E.A.P. Productions
- Release date: 16 July 1993
- Country: Sri Lanka
- Language: Sinhala

Saptha Kanya (English: Seven Virgins) is a 1993 Sinhalese language drama romantic film directed and produced by H.D. Premaratne. The film stars Kamal Addararachchi and Sangeetha Weeraratne in the leading roles. Playback singing was by Damayanthi Jayasooriya, Kamal Addararachchi, Rookantha Gunathilake, Dhammika Valpola and Morris Wijesinghe.

Lyrics were composed by Ajantha Ranasinghe, Camilus Perera and Vasantha Kumara Kobawaka. It was an instant hit among the youth and some of its songs such as "Unmadawoo Premaadhare" and "Suwanda Dhaenee" are still famous today.

== Synopsis ==
Saptha Kanya follows the turbulent love story of Akhil Ruwanwalla (Kamal Addararachchi), a young photographer, and Deepthi (Sangeetha Weeraratne), a mysterious woman he meets at a pub. Their initial friendship blossoms into romance, but their relationship soon becomes entangled in a dangerous underworld.

One night, Akhil is assaulted by a group of gangsters who steal his camera, which contains photos of Deepthi. His roommate, Roni Kalupahana (Hemasiri Liyanage), a fearless newspaper editor committed to exposing the truth, writes an article revealing the identities of the criminals behind such attacks. However, his pursuit of justice comes at a price—he is brutally murdered by the same criminal syndicate.

Despite the tragedy, Akhil remains determined to build a future with Deepthi. He partners with his friend, Jagath Wickremasinghe (Jayalath Manoratne), to open a photography studio, with Deepthi offering financial assistance. On the day of the studio’s grand opening, the police arrive with a set of photographs for Akhil to identify. To his shock, among them is Dabare (Tony Ranasinghe), the gang leader responsible for his attack, and Deepthi herself. Unwilling to expose Deepthi to the authorities, Akhil feigns ignorance. However, the police quickly discover that the camera Deepthi had recently gifted him was stolen property. Under pressure, Deepthi confesses to her past—she was a pickpocket and had ties to the Dabare gang. She is arrested and sentenced to two years in prison, while Akhil, heartbroken but steadfast, remains devoted to her.

Two years later, Akhil’s studio is thriving. Upon Deepthi’s release, he proposes marriage, but she hesitates, believing her criminal past makes her unworthy. Akhil refuses to let her past define their future, and after much persuasion, they marry and begin a new life together. Their happiness, however, is short-lived when Dabare resurfaces, claiming Deepthi was once his wife and blackmailing Akhil for money. When they refuse, Dabare’s associate, Pinto, arrives at their home to threaten Deepthi. In self-defense, she fatally stabs him.

Fearing arrest, the couple flees to a remote village under new identities—Akhil as Pushpadeva Nagollagama and Deepthi as Mangala. Their life is harsh, but they remain hopeful, especially with Deepthi expecting their child. However, their past catches up to them when the police track them down. As they attempt to escape into the wilderness, Deepthi goes into labor. Desperate to save her, Akhil returns home seeking medical help, only to be confronted by the police. He pleads for his wife’s life, but despite medical intervention, Deepthi dies in childbirth. Akhil is left devastated, holding their newborn child—the only remaining piece of the woman he loved.

== Cast ==
- Kamal Addararachchi as Akhil Ruwanwalla
- Sangeetha Weeraratne as Deepthi aka Soma
- Tony Ranasinghe as Dabare
- Jayalath Manoratne as Jagath
- Hemasiri Liyanage as Rony
- Suminda Sirisena as Sarath
- Manike Attanayake as Mrs. Silva
- Robin Fernando as Police Inspector
- J.H. Jayawardana
- Devinda Marcus
- Gnananga Gunawardana
- Saman Weerasiri
- Mangala Karunarathna
- Srinath Maldeniya
- Dunston Chandralal
- Kalpana Rangani
- Ruwanthi Mangala
- Shashikala Hettiarachchi
- Shirani Deraniyagala

== Soundtrack ==
No.	Title	Lyrics	Singer(s)	Length
1.	"Suwanda Danee Danee Danenawa"	Ajantha Ranasinghe	Rookantha Gunathilake
2.	"Unmaadawoo Premadare"	Camilus Perera	Kamal Addararachchi, Damayanthi Jayasooriya
3.	"Doowillen Wathsunu Thawara"	Wasantha Kumara Kobawaka	Morris Wijesinghe

== Awards ==
- Best Script Writer

10th Presidential Award 1994 H.D. Premarathna

- Best Supporting Actor

10th Presidential Award 1994 Tony Ranasinghe

- Best Supporting Actor

22nd Sarasaviya Awards - 1994 Tony Ranasinghe

- Best Editor

22nd Sarasaviya Awards - 1994 Elmo Haliday

- Best Lyricist

22nd Sarasaviya Awards - 1994 Ajantha Ranasinghe

- Best Singer - Male

22nd Sarasaviya Awards - 1994 Rukantha Gunathilaka

- Best Performance Award

22nd Sarasaviya Awards - 1994 Kamal Addararachchi

- Best Upcoming Actress

22nd Sarasaviya Awards - 1994 Sangeetha Weeraratne

- Best Cinematographer

21st OCIC Award Ceremony 1994 Suminda Weerasinghe

- Best Performance Award - Bronze

21st OCIC Award Ceremony 1994 Tony Ranasinghe

- Best Lyricist

10th Presidential Award 1994 Wasantha Kumara Kobawaka

- Best Melody

10th Presidential Award 1994 Rohana Weerasinghe

- Best Singer - Male

10th Presidential Award 1994 Kamal Addararachchi

- Best Singer - Female

10th Presidential Award 1994 Damayanthi Jayasuriya

- Best Script Writer

6th Swarna Sanka Cinema Awards Ceremony 1994 H.D. Premarathna

- Best Supporting Actor

6th Swarna Sanka Cinema Awards Ceremony 1994 Tony Ranasinghe

- Best Lyricist

6th Swarna Sanka Cinema Awards Ceremony 1994 Wasantha Kumara Kobawaka
