= Kuveni 2: Yakshadeshaya =

Kuveni 2: Yakshadeshaya කුවේණි 2: යක්ෂාදේශය
- Directed by: Sugath Samarakoon
- Starring: Roger Seneviratne; Harini Kawyanjani Perera; Wasantha Kumaravila
- Cinematography: Gamini Fernando
- Music by: Shan Gunawardena
- Country: Sri Lanka
- Language: Sinhala

Yakshadeshaya (Sinhala: ව්ජය කුවේණි 2: යක්ෂාදේශය) is an upcoming Sri Lankan Sinhala epic biographical film directed by Sugath Samarakoon. It stars Roger Seneviratne in lead roles along with Wasantha Kumaravila . Music composed by Shan Gunawardena.

== Production ==
The maiden casting session for the film was held at the Sudarshi Hall at Bauddhaloka Mawatha on 10 June 2018. Muhurath ceremony was held at the Tharangani Hall of National Film Corporation building.

== Plot ==
The storyline revolve around direct descendants of the Siu Hela tribes (four ethnic tribes) who are found among the Vedda community where a young educated youth start to discover their genealogical truth.

== Cast ==
- Roger Seneviratne as Randuna
- Harini Kawyanjani Perera as Gomari
- Wasantha Kumaravila
- Buddhadasa Vithanarachchi
- Anura Dharmasiriwardena
- Sugath Wijesekara
- Rinsley Weeraratne
