= Sewwandi =

Sewwandi සෙව්වන්දි
- Directed by: Vasantha Obeysekera
- Written by: Vasantha Obeyesekera
- Produced by: Sunil T. Films; Sangeetha Weeraratne
- Starring: Sangeetha Weeraratne; Kamal Addararachchi; Ravindra Randeniya
- Cinematography: Jayanath Gunawardena
- Edited by: Ravindra Guruge
- Music by: Rohana Weerasinghe
- Production companies: Prasad Color Lab, Chennai
- Distributed by: EAP Theaters
- Release date: 7 December 2006
- Country: Sri Lanka
- Language: Sinhala

Sewwandi (The Rose) (Sinhala: සෙව්වන්දි) is a 2006 Sri Lankan Sinhala war drama directed by Vasantha Obeysekera and co-produced by Sunil T. Fernando for Sunil T. Films with Sangeetha Weeraratne. It stars Sangeetha Weeraratne herself with Kamal Addararachchi in lead roles, along with Ravindra Randeniya and Chandani Seneviratne. The film's music was composed by Rohana Weerasinghe. In addition to the Sinhala version, two more Tamil versions were also released in two theatres. It is the 1080th Sri Lankan film in the Sinhala cinema.

== Cast ==
- Sangeetha Weeraratne as Kumari
- Kamal Addararachchi as Pradeep
- Ravindra Randeniya as Priyantha
- Chandani Seneviratne as Lalitha
- Dilhani Ekanayake as Shirani
- Dayan Witharana as Mahinda
- D.B. Gangodathenna
- Muthu Tharanga
- Kumara Thirimadura
- Dayadeva Edirisinghe
