= Colour (film) =

- Sinhala: කලර්
- Directed by: Isuru Weerasinghe Mudali
- Written by: Isuru Weerasinghe Mudali
- Produced by: Hiranthi Samarasinghe; Palitha Samarasinghe
- Starring: Kamal Addararachchi; Sandhani Sulakna; Udayanthi Kulatunga
- Cinematography: Priyantha Malavige
- Edited by: Tissa Surendra
- Music by: Sanka Dineth
- Production company: Nethsukha Films
- Distributed by: CEL Theatres
- Release date: 24 August 2012
- Country: Sri Lanka
- Language: Sinhala

Colour (Sinhala: කලර්) is a 2012 Sri Lankan Sinhala romantic drama film directed by Isuru Weerasinghe Mudali and co-produced by Hiranthi Samarasinghe and Palitha Samarasinghe. It stars Kamal Addararachchi and new coming actress Sandhani Sulakna in lead roles along with Udayanthi Kulatunga and Anjela Seneviratne. Music composed by Sanka Dineth. It is the 1244th Sri Lankan film in the Sinhala cinema.

== Plot ==
A painter (Kamal Addaraarachchi) has a girl that calls him uncle. She asks for his consent to marry a rich boy. He opposes by saying rich men only care about money. Then he relates his past to the girl. Then the story moves to a flashback. The painter has had a relationship with a girl from a rich family during his youth. He meets her in an art gallery and then gradually develops a relationship which culminates in making her pregnant. Then she requests him to meet her parents and she lies to them that he is a wealthy and rich person. In disgust, he leaves her. Then, after a long time, he finds out that she had lied to marry him. In other words, to get her parents' consent. He ultimately finds that the boy in the story is his son and his fiancée had died at the time of delivery. At the end of the story he commits suicide. At the end of the film the girl finds the painter dead on the floor.

== Cast ==
- Kamal Addararachchi as Adithya Devawansha
- Sandhani Sulakna as Sankalani
- Udayanthi Kulatunga
- Anjela Seneviratne
- Srimal Wedisinghe
- Jayani Senanayake
- Aakshya Perera
- Priyantha Mansilu
- Samila Vidanage

== Songs ==
No.	Title	Lyrics	Singer(s)	Length
1.	"Jeevithe Jeevithe"	Isuru Weerasinghe Mudali	Sanka Dineth, Samitha Mudunkotuwa
2.	"Wahi Binduwe"	Isuru Weerasinghe Mudali	Meena Prasadini
3.	"Nuba Sithata Pamini Da"	Isuru Weerasinghe Mudali	Sanka Dineth

== Awards ==
- 2013 Derana Lux Film Festival Jury's Special Award for future hopes on Film Direction - Isuru Weerasinghe
