= Kingsley Jayasekera =

Weliwattage Kingsley Jayasekera
- Born: July 4, 1924; Matale, Sri Lanka
- Died: February 10, 2004 (aged 79)
- Education: St. Thomas' College, Matale; St. Anthony's College, Kandy
- Occupations: Actor, Singer, government officer, play producer
- Spouse: Sujatha Jayasekera (nee Eragoda)

Weliwattage Kingsley Jayasekera (1924–2004) was a Sri Lankan actor, play producer and an A grade radio singer for Sri Lanka Broadcasting Corporation.

== Career ==
Jayasekera was an A grade radio singer for Sri Lanka Broadcasting Corporation, his most notable duet being Monawada Amme Akuru Jathiyak which he sang alongside Priscilla Opatha. His other songs include Koomala Thaalen, Mey Pun, Namawu Namawu, Sukumaara Sithe Eyida, Raaweki Pem Gee, Duk Gage Rali Naga, Premi Mage, Ma Premaya Nothaka, Pun Wesage and Diya Naema Pinisa.He is also the first Sinhala artiste to sing Saighal in Sinhala

Jayasekera starred in Gambada Sundari which is the first Sinhala colour movie produced in Ceylon, being filmed in 16 mm. He subsequently acted in two other Sinhala movies named Surangani and Surathali Jayasekera has also acted in numerous Sri Lankan plays such as Radala Piliruwa, Nikan Awa, Manthreewaraya, Marahada, Anthima Hasuna

Jayasekera was also a producer of several plays including Kapuwa Kapothi, Sundara Samiya, Sundara Birida, Dosthara Baana, Guwane Maliga and Kalyana Mithraya.

== Personal life ==
Jayasekera's father was the first Sinhalese owner-manager of an independent plantation in pre-war Sri Lanka. Jayasekera married Sujatha Eragoda in 1952 and had five children Geethanganee, Niranjanee, Chandana, Priyankara and Anoja. He was the father in law of Maheshi Jayasekera, the first female Registrar of the Supreme Court of Sri Lanka. Jayasekera died in February 2004.
