= Anithya =

- Film poster
- Sinhala: අනිත්‍යා
- Directed by: Nalaka Vithanage
- Written by: Nalaka Vithanage
- Produced by: Nalaka Vithanage
- Starring: Manik Wijewardena; Vishwa Lanka; Kishani Alanki
- Cinematography: P. Balasooriya
- Edited by: Eshan Motagedara
- Music by: Buddika Sri Kahawala; Madushan Fonseka
- Release date: 22 March 2013
- Country: Sri Lanka
- Language: Sinhala

Anithya (Sinhala: අනිත්‍යා) is a 2013 Sri Lankan Sinhala romantic film directed and produced by Nalaka Vithanage for Cinosis Vision productions along with Nuwan Weliwita, Kosala Tantula, Chinthaka Ranaweera and Haren Nagodawithana. It stars Manik Wijewardena, Vishwa Lanka and Kishani Alanki in lead roles along with Udith Abeyrathne and Sangeetha Weeraratne. Music co-composed by Buddika Sri Kahawala and Madushan Fonseka. It is the 1186th Sri Lankan film in the Sinhala cinema.

== Cast ==
- Vishwa Lanka as Milan
- Manik Wijewardena as Kaushi
- Kishani Alanki as Chethana
- Udith Abeyrathne as Imran
- Sangeetha Weeraratne as Sherine
- Roger Seneviratne as Derrick
- Bandula Vithanage as Milan's father
- Gunawardana Hettiarachchi as Chethana's father
- Milinda Madugalla as Psychopath
- Aruni Kodithuwakku as Anushka
- Thilini Priyanvada as Nurse

== Soundtrack ==
No.	Title	Singer(s)	Length
1.	"Jeevithetawath Dakala Nathi"	Nishantha Dangamuwa
2.	"Madahase"	Malik Perera
3.	"Jeevithema Sinawenna"	Nadika Jayawardena
4.	"Akahema Man"	Malik Perera
