= Sheleena =

2020 Sri Lankan mystery thriller film

- Film poster
- Sinhala: ෂෙලීනා
- Directed by: Poojitha Gunathilake; Chandana Edirisinghe
- Written by: Poojitha Gunathilake
- Produced by: Sheleena Films
- Starring: Dineth de Silva; Amanda Silva; Anuj Ranasinghe; Jeewan Kumaranatunga
- Cinematography: Niranga Sanjeewa
- Edited by: Dilan Gunawardena
- Music by: Lasantha Weerasuriya
- Distributed by: LFD Theaters
- Release date: 21 August 2020
- Country: Sri Lanka
- Language: Sinhala

Sheleena (Sinhala: ෂෙලීනා) is a 2020 Sri Lankan Sinhala mystery thriller film co-directed by Poojitha Gunathilake and Chandana Edirisinghe and produced by director Poojitha himself for Sheleena Films. It stars Dineth de Silva, Amanda Silva and Anuj Ranasinghe in main roles along with Jeewan Kumaranatunga and Veena Jayakody made supportive roles.

The story, dialogues, screenplay, lyrics, melody and production done by Poojitha Gunathilaka. The media screening of the film was held at the Ruby Cinema Hall in Maradana in August 2020. The Tamil dubbed version of the film was released on Ruby theater, Maligawatte; Samantha theater, Dematagoda; Concord theater, Dehiwala; and the Jaffna MC.

== Plot ==
The film revolves around three main Characters Sheleena, Prathap and Suraj. Sheleena is a beautiful lass whose main interest is Dancing and engaged to a young Crime Investigation Officer Suraj. A serial killer is in town and chain of murders occurs of ballerinas and CID is in the quest of searching the culprit. Prathap is a person with a mysterious lifestyle and one day Sheleena is being kidnapped and kept under lock and key by him but kept as pet along with his other animal lovers. Gradually a romance been developed among two and the end of the story turns into an unexpected end.

== Cast ==
- Dineth de Silva as Prathap
- Amanda Silva as Sheleena
- Anuj Ranasinghe as Suraj
- Jeewan Kumaranatunga as Randeniya
- Veena Jayakody as Sheleena's wife
- Manohari Wimalatunga
- Rohitha Dias
- Dushi Priyanga Illangakoon
- Rohan Wijetunga as Chandana
- Dayasiri Hettiarachchi
- Sanjula Diwarathne
