= Doni (film) =

Doni දෝණි
- Directed by: V. Sivadasan
- Written by: V. Sivadasan
- Produced by: Sunil T. Films
- Starring: Kamal Addararachchi; Sangeetha Weeraratne; Sanath Gunathilake
- Cinematography: Sujith Nishantha
- Edited by: Anusha Sanjeewa
- Music by: Somapala Rathnayake
- Release date: 19 December 2013
- Country: Sri Lanka
- Language: Sinhala

Doni (Sinhala: දෝණි) is a 2013 Sri Lankan Sinhala children's and family drama film directed by V. Sivadasan and produced by Sunil T. Fernando for Sunil T. Films. It stars Kamal Addararachchi and Sangeetha Weeraratne in lead roles along with Sanath Gunathilake and Paboda Sandeepani. Music composed by Somapala Rathnayake. It is the 1199th Sri Lankan film in the Sinhala cinema. This film is a remake of Tamil film Anjali.

The muhurath ceremony was celebrated at Rajagiriya Sovereign Hotel. The film introduced many child actors to the film industry.

== Plot ==
A businessman, Senaka lives with his pregnant wife, Malathi and two children, Ruwan and Sigithi. Malathi is rushed to hospital and Senaka tells her that their newborn daughter had died when she was born. The child was to be given the name Nilesha. Eventually, the family moves on from their grief due to their lost child.

=== 5 years later ===
Senaka and his family move in to a new apartment. They meets Bandu, who is an ex-convict. Meanwhile, Malathi discovers that Senaka has been spending money for years for some reason she is not aware of. Senaka reveals that their daughter, Nilesha is still alive. The money was spent to pay the monthly fee to a nurse Laalani, dedicated to take care of her. The doctor of the hospital explains the whole story to Malathi, stating that they still cannot assure that Nilesha will live for a long time. Senaka and Malathi bring Nilesha home.

Nilesha's brain has not developed parallel to her age. Seeing her condition, Ruwan and Sigithi refuse to accept Nilesha as their sister. However, Nilesha starts to get fond of her siblings. She often falls ill and gets bullied by other kids and neighbors at apartment. Bandu starts bonding with Nilesha, irking Malini and Senaka. Bandu saves Senaka from a criminal and confronts other residents in apartment when they complained about Nilesha. Senaka and Malathi's view on Bandu changes after that.

One day, Nilesha suddenly falls unconscious. On recovering, she calls Malathi Amma, getting Malathi emotional. Finally, Nilesha's doctor calls Senaka and assures that Nilesha's heart problem can be treated successfully.

== Cast ==
- Menuli Ellawala as Nilesha Gunawardena aka Doni
- Kamal Addararachchi as Senaka Gunawardena
- Sangeetha Weeraratne as Malathi Gunawardena
- Chamindu Bawantha as Ruwan Gunawardena
  - Aasiri Pathum as Child Ruwan
- Dilki Nethmini as Sigithi Gunawardena
  - Hansi Prabodha as Child Sigithi
- Sanath Gunathilake as Bandu
- Rangana Premaratne as Silva
- Ananda Wickramage as Abepala
- Udeni Alwis as Threewheel driver
- Sahan Wijesinghe
- Kapila Sigera as Gune
- Jeevan Handunnetti as Rita's husband
- Paboda Sandeepani as Teacher (Cameo)

== Soundtrack ==
No.	Title	Singer(s)	Length
1.	"Kiri Sihina Bindunado"	Bachi Susun
2.	"Anantha Tharu Ra"	Nanda Malini, Ravindu Lakshan, Vidusha Nethranjali, Chanaka Lakmal
3.	"Samanallu"	Suranji Shamali, Ravindu Lakshan, Vidusha Nethranjali, Chanaka Lakmal
