= Kinihiriya Mal =

2001 film by H.D. Premaratne

- කිනිහිරියා මල්
- Directed by: H.D. Premaratne
- Written by: Sarathchandra Gamlath
- Based on: H.D. Premaratne
- Produced by: EAP Films
- Starring: Kamal Addararachchi; Sangeetha Weeraratne; Vasanthi Chathurani; Roger Seneviratne
- Cinematography: Suminda Weerasinghe
- Edited by: Elmo Haliday
- Music by: Rohana Weerasinghe
- Distributed by: EAP Theaters
- Release date: 3 May 2001
- Country: Sri Lanka
- Language: Sinhala

Kinihiriya Mal (Fire Flies) (Sinhala: කිනිහිරියා මල්) is a 2001 Sri Lankan Sinhala romantic drama film directed by H.D. Premaratne as his last film and produced by Soma Edirisinghe for EAP Films. It film stars large number of artists where Kamal Addararachchi and Sangeetha Weeraratne in lead roles along with Vasanthi Chathurani and Roger Seneviratne. Music composed by Rohana Weerasinghe. It is the 953rd Sri Lankan film in the Sinhala cinema.

== Cast ==
- Kamal Addararachchi as Sanka
- Sangeetha Weeraratne as Sanduni / Jean
- Vasanthi Chathurani as Renuka
- Roger Seneviratne as Vijitha
- Sanoja Bibile as Princey
- Asoka Peiris as Renuka's father
- Pradeep Senanayaka as Gadaya
- Tony Ranasinghe as Edwin
- Iranganie Serasinghe as Sylvia Madam
- Ellen Sylvester as Sophie Nona
- Nilanthi Wijesinghe as Girley
- Daya Thennakoon as Amadoris
- Ramani Fonseka as Renuka's mother
- Gnananga Gunawardhana as Brothel customer
- Saman Hemarathna as Pavement hawker
- Saman Almeida as Almeida
- Keerthi Ranjith Peiris as Village uncle
- Grace Ariyawimal as Sanduni's mother
- Damitha Saluwadana as Brothel handler
- Corrine Almeida as Club singer
- Veena Jayakody as Brothel receptionist
- Susila Kottage as Factory overseer
- Lal Kularatne as Kavi Mudalali
- Premila Kuruppu as Princey's Mother
- Ronnie Leitch as Mr. Shopman
- Somasiri Colombage as Waiter
- Gunadasa Madurasinghe
- Simon Navagattegama
- Nimal Anthony

== Production ==
The film has been shot around Colombo and last scenes at two hotels, Sapphire Hotel and Galadari Hotel. Shooting completed at the mid of April 1999. Heavy shooting were conducted in and around Galewela area before the monsoon rains. The film was the last film to be completed during 1999 at Film Corporation Studios Dalugama as the last film of the Millennium.

Dileepa Abeysekere, who is the son of late lyricist Karunaratne Abeysekera made his debut as a lyricist in this film along with Wasantha Kumara Kobawaka. Soma Edirisinghe produced the film as 14th production, whereas 17th film directed by H.D. Premaratne. Editing and other post productions were completed in August 1999 to make arrangements to screen the film before the Public Performances Board (PPB). The film was prepared to be released with another movie directed by H.D. Premaratne, Mandakini.

== Reception ==
The film has received mixed reviews from critics.
