= Dorakada Marawa =

Dorakada Marawa දොරකඩ මාරාව
- official DVD poster
- Directed by: Vasantha Obeysekera
- Written by: Vasantha Obeysekera
- Produced by: Abeysena Salaroo
- Starring: Sanath Gunathilake; Sangeetha Weeraratne; Veena Jayakody
- Cinematography: Jayanath Gunawardena
- Edited by: Stanley de Alwis
- Music by: Rohana Weerasinghe
- Distributed by: Fifth circuit
- Release date: 2 October 1998
- Running time: 120 minutes
- Country: Sri Lanka
- Language: Sinhala

Dorakada Marawa (Death at the Doorstep) (Sinhala: දොරකඩ මාරාව) is a 1998 Sri Lankan Sinhala drama film directed by Vasantha Obeysekera and produced by Sarath Abeysena for Abeysena Salaroo. It stars Sanath Gunathilake and Sangeetha Weeraratne in lead roles along with Veena Jayakody and Sathischandra Edirisinghe. Music composed by Rohana Weerasinghe. It is the 904th Sri Lankan film in the Sinhala cinema.

== Plot ==
The film revolves about the death of a newly-wed couple in a car crash.

== Cast ==
- Sanath Gunathilake as Priyantha
- Sangeetha Weeraratne as Subhashini
- Veena Jayakody as Priyantha's mother
- Sathischandra Edirisinghe as Subha's father
- D.B Surendra
- Ramani Fonseka
- Malkanthi Jayasinghe
- Rex Kodippili
- Geetha Kanthi Jayakody as Subhashini's sister
- Roger Seneviratne as Priyantha's friend
- Buddhadasa Vithanarachchi as Coroner
- Bandula Vithanage
- Sarath Namalgama
