= Salelu Warama =

Salelu Warama සලෙලු වරම
- Directed by: Vasantha Obeysekera
- Written by: Vasantha Obeysekera
- Based on: True story
- Produced by: EAP Films
- Starring: Kamal Addararachchi; Sangeetha Weeraratne; Tony Ranasinghe
- Cinematography: Jayanath Gunawardena
- Edited by: Elmo Halliday
- Music by: Rohana Weerasinghe
- Distributed by: EAP Theaters
- Release date: 17 October 2002
- Country: Sri Lanka
- Language: Sinhala

Salelu Warama (The Web of Love) (Sinhala: සලෙලු වරම) is a 2002 Sri Lankan Sinhala drama film directed by Vasantha Obeysekera and produced by Soma Edirisinghe for EAP Films. It stars Kamal Addararachchi and Sangeetha Weeraratne in lead roles along with Tony Ranasinghe and Saumya Liyanage. Music composed by Rohana Weerasinghe.

The film has based on a true story took place for 27 days in Horana and Akuressa areas. It is the 1165th Sri Lankan film in the Sinhala cinema.

== Cast ==
- Kamal Addararachchi as Suren Galappaththi
- Sangeetha Weeraratne as Priyanka
- Pradeep Senanayake as Sunil Gunasekara
- Tony Ranasinghe as Priyanka's Father
- Saumya Liyanage as Darshan
- Nayana Kumari as Vineetha
- Ramani Fonseka as Priyanka's mother
- Hemasiri Liyanage as Suren's father
- Janak Premalal as Suren's brother
- Nayani Maheshika as Suren's sister
- Srinath Maldeniya as Passport issuer
- Purna Sampath de Alwis as Suren's brother-in-law
- Asela Jayakody as Suren's roommate
- Gunawardena Hettiarachchi as Prosecutor
- Mike Fernando as Police OIC
