= Ira Laga Wadi =

- Sinhala: ඉර ළඟ වැඩියි
- Directed by: Chandraratne Mapitigama
- Written by: Chandraratne Mapitigama
- Produced by: Vindya Ruwanthi Weerkkodi
- Starring: Sanath Gunathilake; Dilhani Ekanayake; Sanath Wimalasiri
- Cinematography: Jayanath Gunawardena
- Music by: Nawarathna Gamage
- Distributed by: Movie Producers & Importers Co (Pvt) Ltd
- Release date: 16 August 2013
- Running time: 120 minutes
- Country: Sri Lanka
- Language: Sinhala

Ira Laga Wadi (Sinhala: ඉර ළඟ වැඩියි; translation: Sun is too Closer) is a 2013 Sri Lankan Sinhala adult drama film directed by Chandraratne Mapitigama and produced by Ruwanthi Films. It stars Sanath Gunathilake and Dilhani Ekanayake in lead roles along with Sanath Wimalasiri and Rajitha Hiran. Music composed by Nawarathna Gamage. It is the 1191st Sri Lankan film in the Sinhala cinema.

== Cast ==
- Sanath Gunathilake as Saliya
- Dilhani Ekanayake as Sewwandi
- Rajitha Hiran as Rajitha
- Nilanthi Dias
- Sanath Wimalasiri as Kumara
- Ruwanthi Mangala as Savithri
- Vishaka Siriwardana as Vishaka
- Wijeratne Warakagoda as Wijeratne
- Ishan Gammudali
- Saman Almeida as Saman
- Miyuri Samarasinghe

== Soundtrack ==
No.	Title	Lyrics	Music	Singer(s)	Length
1.	"Sitha Kalambei"	Chandaratne Mapitigama	Navarathna Gamage	Sandeepa Kumbukage
2.	"Sirurin Rudhiraya Galayi"	Sandeepa Kumbukage	Sandeepa Kumbukage	Sandeepa Kumbukage
