= Kamal Addararachchi =

Sri Lankan actor and singer

Kamal Addararachchi කමල් අද්දරආරච්චි
- Born: Addararachchige Gunendra Kamal; 5 February 1962 (age 64); Sri Lanka
- Occupations: Actor, singer, teacher
- Years active: 1977–present
- Spouse: Anurani Addararachchi
- Awards: Sarasaviya Best Actor Award (2002)

Addararachchige Gunendra Kamal (born on 5 February 1962: Sinhala: කමල් අද්දරආරච්චි), popularly known as Kamal Addararachchi, is an actor in Sri Lankan cinema, theatre and television, as well as a singer and presenter. He made his debut as an actor in Gamini Fonseka's 1981 film Sagarayak Meda, whilst he was still a student at school. Since the late 1970s, he has appeared in a variety of roles in many films and teledramas. He has acted in over 40 films, 20 teledramas and six stage plays, and won the Sarasaviya Best Actor Award for his role of Sobana in Jayantha Chandrasiri's film Agnidahaya in 2002.

He also made a mark as a singer in 1993 with "Unmadawoo," a duet with Damayanthi Jayasooriya, which was featured in the film Saptha Kanya. He was also the host of the first three seasons of Sirasa Superstar, a reality show, the first session of Swarnavahini Mega Star and the first season of Hiru Mega Stars.

Kamal is often hailed as the "Timeless romantic icon of Sri Lankan Cinema" and is widely known as the "Sri Lankan Shah Rukh Khan".https://ceylontoday.lk/2025/07/05/two-icons-one-legacy-of-stardom-across-south-asia/

== Background ==
He completed his education from Wesley College, Colombo.

He showed an initial interest in artistic work, and this prompted him to do music, Sinhala literature, Kandyan Dancing and debating, all at the same time. He even worked as the secretary of the 'Sinhala Literary Society' whilst at school.

He is married to Anurani Addararachchi and has two sons. He was an English teacher as well.

== Career ==
The play Ane Ablick was staged in Colombo in 1978, marked Kamal's first significant public theatre performance. Addararachchi, who broke into the silver screen with Gamini Fonseka's Sagarayak Meda, rose to immense popularity with hits such as Saptha Kanya.

He is noted for his performances in films such as Saptha Kanya by H. D. Premaratne and Agnidahaya by Jayantha Chandrasiri, and teldramas like Hiruta Muvaven by Herbert Ranjith Peiris, Rathu Rosa by Ranjan De Silva, and Weda Hamine and Dandubasna Maanaya by Jayantha Chandrasiri.

His performance on the mini screen for Dandubasna Maanaya was twice rewarded at the inaugural Sumathi Tele Awards ceremony in 1995, when he received the award for Best Supporting Actor as well as the Most Popular Actor Award.

In July 2012, he appeared his first music video, with Mahendra Perera and Dayan Witharana, for the song "Hithagaawa" by Tilan Fernando. The music video was directed by Prasanna Andradi and released in the first week of December 2012.

He has not appeared in a teledrama since 2005.

== Awards ==
1995 – Sumathi Best Supporting Actor Award
1995 – Sumathi Most Popular Actor Award
1996 – Best Supporting Actor Presidential Award
2002 – Sarasaviya Best Actor Award
2019 – Best Actor Presidential Award

== Filmography ==
Year	Film no.	Film	Role	Ref
1981	488	Sagarayak Mada		
1982	537	Paramitha	Thaaraka	
1983	548	Kaliyugaya		
1987		Sathyagrahanaya		
1988	674	Gedara Budun Amma	Ruwan	
1991	718	Paradise		
1993	782	Saptha Kanya	Akhil Ruwanwalla	
1994	796	Ekada Wahi	Charlie	
1995	831	Maruthaya		
1995	836	Awaragira	Dayaweera	
1996	860	Loku Duwa	Duminda	
1996	864	Bithu Sithuwam		
1997	880	Mahamera Usata		
1997	886	Bawa Karma	Appu	
1998	895	Sathutai Kirula Ape	Shane	
1998	902	Julietge Bhumikawa	Devinda Dassanayake	
2001	953	Kinihiriya Mal	Sanka	
2002	976	Seethala Gini Kandu	Rohana	
2002	978	Kalu Sudu Mal	Ravindra Kumara alias Dilip	
2002	990	Salelu Warama	Suren Galappaththi	
2002	996	Agnidahaya	Sobana	
2004	1041	Mille Soya	Maxi	
2004	1045	Randiya Dahara	Captain Samantha Weerasuriya	
2005	1048	Asani Warsha	Sanjeeva Godakumbura	
2005	1050	Guerilla Marketing	Thisara Dissanayake	
2006	1070	Samaara	Kalana	
2006	1074	Rana Hansi	Inspector	
2006	1080	Sewwandi	Pradeep	
2012	1169	Maatha		
2012		Light in the Yellow Breathing Space	Short film	
2012	1177	Colour	Adithya Devawansha	
2013	1199	Doni	Senaka Gunawardena	
2014	1213	Thanha Rathi Ranga	Chandare	
2015	1238	Address Na	Sathgunawath Pinsara	
2018	1310	Gharasarapa	Sandares Edirisinghe	
2019	1321	Ginnen Upan Seethala	Rohana Wijeweera	

== Songs ==
Songs by Kamal Addaraarachchi
No.	Title	Length
1.	"Thun Sitha Dahan Gathawena" (with Neela Wickramasinghe)	04.34
2.	"Unmadawoo Premadare" (with Damayanthi Jayasooriya)	04.30
