= Jeewan Kumaranatunga =

Sri Lankan actor and politician

Hon. Jeewan Kumaranatunga ජීවන් කුමාරතුංග

Minister of Youth Affairs
- In office 2000–2001

Minister of Sports & Youth Affairs

Minister of Lands & Land Development
- In office 2007–2010

Minister of Posts & Telecommunication
- In office 2010–2015

Member of Parliament for Colombo
- In office 1994–2015

Personal details
- Born: November 7, 1958 (age 68) Seeduwa, Sri Lanka
- Party: Sri Lanka Freedom Party
- Other political affiliations: United People's Freedom Alliance
- Spouse: Shereen Senaratne (m. 1986)
- Relations: Vijaya Kumaranatunga, Ranjan Ramanayake
- Children: 3
- Parent: Sydney Kumaranatunga (father)
- Education: Carey College, Colombo
- Occupation: Politician
- Profession: Film Actor

Jeewan Kumaranatunga (born 7 November 1958: Sinhala: ජීවන් කුමාරතුංග), is an actor in Sri Lankan cinema, theater and television, who later became a politician, a former member of the parliament and a former cabinet minister. He is a close relative of former President Chandrika Kumaratunga and the nephew of actor and politician Vijaya Kumaratunga.

== Family ==
He was born on 7 November 1958 in Seeduwa. His father Sydney Kumaranatunga was also a film actor who acted in Ran Onchilla. Sydney's brother, Vijaya was a renowned actor and politician. Jeewan completed his education from Carey College, Colombo. His grandfather Benjamin Ralahami also acted in several plays during the Towerhall era.

Jeewan is married to his longtime partner Sherin and they have two daughters - Malsha and Maleesha and one son, Harshamana.

Kumaranatunga's daughter, Malsha, successfully contested the Colombo district seat on the Western Provincial Council in 2014.

== Cinema career ==
Jeevan first acted in school plays while studying at Carey College, Colombo. After joining the scouting troupe, Bermin Laili Fernando encouraged him to act on the school stage. He later made many school plays and performed in bonfire scenes. His play won first place in Sri Lanka's youth talent jamboree as well. Even after leaving school, he established the Sarasavi art circle and performed plays in the village.

Jeevan first came to acting as a stage actor. He performed about two plays a year on the Polkota Udahadana stage of the University Art Institute established in his village in Seeduwa. After that, he came to get a chance to act for Sudharshi Theatre where he got the opportunity to act in stage dramas like Devlowa Yanakam, Nāyakayā, Juliyā, and Katharagama Rūmathiya. It was during this time that he got an invitation from Ratnaweera de Silva to join the lead role in the film Thani Tharuva. But its producers protested as the shooting approached to cast me in the lead role. At that time, Sanath Gunathilaka who had acted in about five films, was cast as the main character and Jeevan was cast as the villain. There he got to play the role of a "school student".

One of Sri Lanka's best commercially successful film artists, Kumaranatunga started his cinema career alongside his uncle, Vijaya. His maiden cinema acting came through Thani Tharuwa, even though it was released in 1982. His first screened film was Ganga Addara, where he acted in a minor role as Liyana Mahaththaya. He started the cinema through the villainous characters, acted as the main villain in many films such Jaya Sikuruyi, Obaṭa Divurā Kiyannam, Nævatha Hamuvemu, Suraduthiyō, Rūmathiyayi Neethiyayi, and Prārthanā.

He started a very successful journey through his own production, Hitha Honda Chandiya, setting huge records in the cinema. Næva Gilūnath Bǣn Chūn, Mamayi Rajā, Nommara 17, Okkoma Rajavaru, Hitha Honda Sellam, Rajadaruvō, and Come ō Gō Chicāgō reached the pinnacle of acting. His first romantic heroic role came through 1984 film Hitha Honda Kollek directed by Roy de Silva. After that he continued to receive many heroic protagonist roles. During this period, he usually acted with Anoja Weerasinghe, which made them a cinema couple for many years. Some of the most popular Jeewan-Anoja couple films include Mamai Raja, Obata Rahasak Kiyannam, Newatha Api Ekwemu, Randenigala Sinhaya, Yukthiyata Wada, Veera Udara and Esala Sanda. In 1990, he won the Sarasaviya award for the Most Popular Actor.

He acted in about ten television serials, such as Rana Kahawanu, Sudu Paraviyo, Hingana Kolla and Amarapuraya. He produced seven films as a film producer, such as Randeṇigala Sinhayā, Aesala Sanda, Mama Obē Hithavathā, Kadirā, Mē Vaārē Magē, Koṭisanā and Wali Sulanga. But later on, as he got busy with politics, film production got away from him. Ninety percent of the commercial films in which he has acted are very successful as a large number of the films crossed the hundred day mark. He also got to contribute to several dramatic films such as Keḷi Maḍala, Thunveni Aehæ, and Sathyādēvi. He even won the Sarasaviya award for the best supporting actor for the role in the film Kelimandala and also received merit awards.

== Politics ==
In 1991, he went to the Southern Provincial Council election and fulfilled a great responsibility. Then in the 1993 provincial council election, he contested from the Colombo district and won first place. Later he contested the 1994 general election and ranked third in the Colombo district. After that, he got to work in various ministerial positions in the parliament for 23 years. During that time, he ran for five elections and won every time.

== Filmography ==
Year	Film	Role	Ref
1980	Ganga Addara	Liyana Mahaththaya	
1981	Hondama Naluwa		
1981	Saranga		
1982	Bicycle	Voice Dubber, Ajith (voice - pool scene)	
1982	Thani Tharuwa	Ranil	
1982	Nawatha Hamuwemu	Jagath	
1983	Rathu Makara	Jayantha	
1984	Hitha Honda Kollek		
1984	Jaya Sikurayi		
1985	Puthuni Mata Samawenna		
1985	Doringe Sayanaya		
1985	Obata Diwura Kiyannam		
1985	Du Daruwo		
1985	Sura Duthiyo		
1986	Prarthana		
1986	Asipatha Mamai	Akalanka	
1986	Peralikarayo	Sunny	
1986	Jaya Apitai	Disable prisoner	
1986	Sinha Pataw	Jeevan	
1987	Hitha Honda Chandiya	Jinadasa, (also as producer of film)	
1987	Ahinsa	Raj Ranathilaka	
1988	Rasa Rahasak		
1988	Gedera Budun Amma	Inspector Romesh	
1988	Nawa Gilunath Ban Chun	Suresh Gunathilake	
1988	Nawatha Api Ekwemu	Sanjaya/Vishwa	
1988	Mamai Raja	Ruwan Ranatunga	
1989	Okkoma Rajawaru		
1989	Obata Rahasak Kiyannam		
1989	Nommara 17	Inspector Mahesh	
1989	Sinasenna Ratharan	Shakthi	
1989	Waradata Danduwama		
1989	Randenigala Sinhaya	Raju, (also as producer of film)	
1990	Thanha Asha	Suresh	
1990	Yukthiyata Wada	Krishan Wasantha	
1990	Weera Udara		
1990	Saharave Sihinaya		
1990	Pem Raja Dahana	Corporal Malan	
1990	Madu Sihina	Raja aka Raju	
1990	Chandi Raja	Michael	
1990	Honda Honda Sellan	Inspector Srinath	
1990	Hitha Honda Puthek	Sena	
1991	Sihina Ahase Wasanthaya	Jagath	
1991	Keli Madala	Jayendra	
1991	Raja Sellan		
1991	Esala Sanda	Janaka Mahanama / Asoka (as producer)	
1991	Ran Hadawatha	Anthony	
1991	Bambara Kalape	Captain Raju	
1991	Ma Obe Hithawatha	Dharme (as producer)	
1992	Ranabime Veeraya		
1992	Raja Daruwo	Jeevan Kaluperuma	
1992	Sakwithi Raja		
1992	Me Ware Mage		
1992	Rumathiyay Nithiyay	Jagath	
1992	Oba Mata Vishwasayi	Jagath	
1992	Suranimala	Suranimala	
1992	Muwan Palessey Kadira	(as producer)	
1992	Rajek Wage Puthek		
1992	Sayanaye Sihinaya		
1993	Wali Sulanga	Ashen Ranasinghe, (also as producer of film)	
1993	Come O' Go Chicago	Wickremasinghe Mudaiyanselage Vijayendra 'Vijay' Karunanayake	
1993	Jeevan Malli	Jeevan	
1993	Thrishule	Jeevan	
1993	Lassanai Balanna	Ajith	
1993	Suraweera Chandiyo	Raja	
1994	Shakthi		
1995	Edath Chandiya Adath Chandiya	Podde ayya	
1995	Chandini	Pradeep Jayasekara	
1996	Sihina Wimane Raja Kumari	Inspector Prasad Vijaynayake	
1996	Ratharan Malli	Kasun	
1996	Naralowa Holman	Don Jackson 'Jackie' Salgadu	
1996	Thunweni Aha		
1997	Puthuni Mata Wasana	Sampath	
1997	Raththaran Minihek		
1997	Good Buy Tokyo		
1999	Koti Sana	Sana	
1999	Sathyadevi	Wilbert 'Aiyya'	
2001	Oba Magema Wewa	Kanishka	
2002	Sansara Prarthana		
2002	Seethala Gini Kandu	Sunny	
2003	Hitha Honda Pisso	Dharme	
2004	Randiya Dahara	Lieutenant Colonel Viraj Thenuwara	
2006	Dedunu Wessa		
2006	Supiri Balawatha	Hilton	
2007	Wada Bari Tarzan	Professor Devaka	
2007	Hai Master	Saman	
2008	Nadigai	Police officer	Tamil film
2009	Ali Surathal	Ravi	
2011	Mahindagamanaya	King Devanampiyatissa	
2014	Siri Daladagamanaya	King Guhasiva	
2014	Parapura		
2015	Maharaja Ajasath	King Bimbisara	
2016	Puthandiya	Dharme	
2020	Sheleena		
2023	Swara		
TBD	Hamlet	Post production	
TBD	Jeewa		
TBD	Abhisheka	cameo role	
TBD	Nuhuru Vaeyama	cameo role	
TBA	Housefull †		
