= Dayan Witharana =

Sri Lankan singer and photographer

Dayan Witharana දයාන් විතාරණ
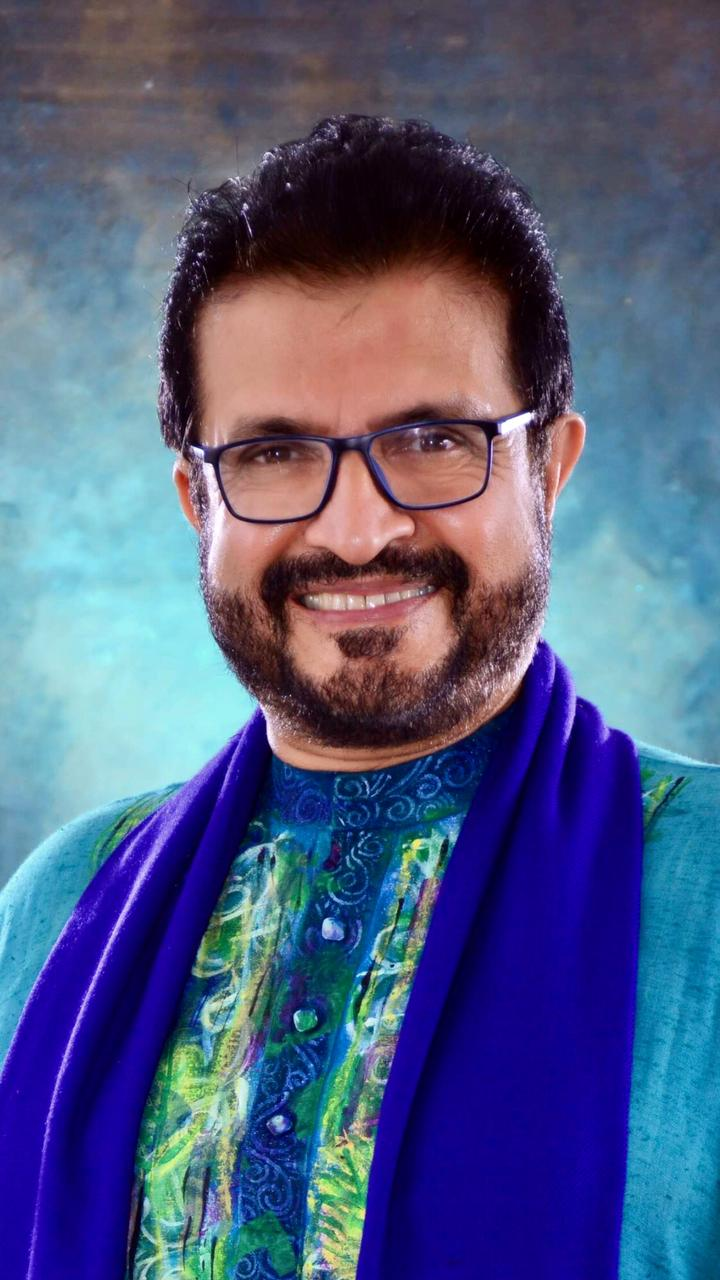
- Born: 18 April 1962 (age 63); Lady Ridgeway Hospital, Sri Lanka
- Education: St. Thomas' College, Matale; Dharmaraja College
- Occupations: Singer, photographer, musician
- Parents: Piyasena Witharana (father); Nalini Daisybelle Jayasooriya (mother)
- Relatives: Gamini Jayasuriya (uncle)
- Musical career
- Genres: Pop; soul; rhythm and blues; Indian classical music
- Instrument: Vocals
- Years active: 1982–present
- Labels: Nilwala; MEntertainment

Dayan Witharana (born 18 April 1962, Sinhala: දයාන් විතාරණ) is a Sri Lankan singer and a photographer. He has sung more than 485 songs across many genres.

== Personal life ==
He was born on 18 April 1962 in Nuwara Eliya as the youngest of the family with two elder sisters – Niranjali Sunethra and Nirmali Savithri. His father Piyasena Witharana was a Local Government Officer and mother Nalini Daisybelle Jayasooriya was a housewife. He lived in Nuwara Eliya from 1962 to 1967 and then moved to Kandy until 1972. In 1968, he entered primary section of Dharmaraja College, Kandy and then entered St. Thomas' College, Matale from grade 6. In 1986, he moved to Colombo with the family and in 1992 permanently resides in Kamathawatte, Rajagiriya.

His mother's parents were Don Alvis Dias Jayasooriya and Satthadhai Attanayake, who got married in 1925. His maternal grandfather was born in 1894 in Meegoda and was the village Headman known as the village mudlier 'Alvis Ralahamy'. His maternal grandmother was born in 1906. Dayan's mother was the first born in that family where she had a brother named Mahinda who was 6 years younger to her.

On 6 January 1976, when Dayan was 13 years old, his father died at the age of 54 by a heart attack. After his father's demise, his mother started a cookery class and a needlework. His mother suffered from cancer for many years where she died on 25 April 2006. Former parliamentarian Gamini Jayasuriya is the cousin of Dayan's mother.

Dayan is single, and he said he will not marry in the future as he is living according to the principles of Buddhism.

== Career ==
Dayan came to Nanda Malini in 1982 to study music when the music academy was opened. He along with Deepika Priyadarshani, Wasantha Thilakangani and Anusha Malwatte made choir groups for Nanda Malini's musical shows.

In 1985, Dayan started to work as a photographer largely due to his passion to take a photograph of Vasanthi Chathurani. His first wedding photography was his boss's daughter Sonali de Silva and Hiran de Silva in 1985. On 20 September 1993, he photographed Chathurani to accomplish his desire. Later, he has photographed almost all actresses and actors in Sri Lanka in a career spanning more than three decades since 1991. He is a popular wedding photographer among celebrities as well as public.

He voiced his first song Waten Eha in 1999 written by Prof. Sunil Ariyaratne. Later, he went to Sing Lanka theater to meet Rohana Weerasinghe. Weerasinghe composed the music for his first four songs – Waten Eha, Namak Nodanna Malak (with Deepika), Aellen Nala (with Nirosha Virajini) and Thugu Giri Kula. On 30 April 2002, Dayan released his first song album Obe Susum Pawan Salai at John de Silva theater. He has sung several classical and simple songs including, Mahada Adunu Ruwa, Daffodil Mala, Obe Neela Neth, Mage Jeewithe and Mawune Sada. Recently, in 2016, the Waradak Nokiyama song composed by lyricist Danushka Kumarathunga, sung by Dayan Vitarana, became a popular song among the fans.

It was Chamika Munasinghe who came up with the idea to compose a song about Ven Gangodawila Soma Thero after Thero's demise in 2003. Chamika invites Ravi Siriwardena to write a song about Soma Thera with the words Deyak Pubuduvalu. H.M. Jayawardena was also told to put a tune and Dayan sang the song which was highly popularized among the public.

In 2006, Dayan made his maiden cinema appearance in the film Sewwandi, where he played the role "Mahinda".
