= Samaara =

Samara සමාරා
- Directed by: Sanjaya Nirmal
- Written by: Sanjaya Nirmal
- Produced by: EAP Films
- Starring: Kamal Addaraarachchi; Kanchana Mendis; Semini Iddamalgoda
- Cinematography: Pradeep Bulathsinghala
- Edited by: Rukmal Nirosh
- Music by: Rohana Weerasinghe
- Distributed by: EAP Theatres
- Release date: 10 May 2006
- Country: Sri Lanka
- Language: Sinhala

Samaara (Sinhala: සමාරා) is a 2006 Sri Lankan Sinhala romantic thriller film directed by Sanjaya Nirmal and produced by Soma Edirisinghe for EAP Films. It stars Kamal Addaraarachchi and Kanchana Mendis in lead roles along with Semini Iddamalgoda and child actress Sandali Welikanne. Music composed by Rohana Weerasinghe. It is the 1070th Sri Lankan film in the Sinhala cinema.

== Plot ==
The film revolves around Samara, a little girl and her mother Indu. Indu is a music loving young mother living with her only child separated from her lover Shane. Being defeated in love Indu has not given up having hopes and dreams. But her dream is shattered when she meets with an accident on her way to a practical test in music.

One Day, Her bike collides with a car driven by young doctor Kalana. Indu is prevented from going for the test and Kalana sympathizes with her. He is attracted to Indu not knowing that she is a mother. Ruwina, Kalana's intended wife who hears this, prevents him from meeting Indu or helping her. Kalana ignores her and buy a new violin for Indu. Kalana shocks after learning Indu's truth, but they fall in love eventually. Kalana and Indu get married.

Soon, Indu's ex-fiancé, Shane sees her and follows her. Once he meet Indu in her home, he learns that Samara is his daughter. Shane shocks and demands Indu to give Samara to him when Indu refuses. Shane kidnaps Samara to get custody of her. Samara faints as she scared and Shane admits her to hospital. Indu and Kalana come to hospital and meet Samara. But Samara dies, leaving Shane arrested and shock for Indu.

3 months later, Kalana and Indu's marriage seems to fall apart due to Samara's death. Kalana becomes rude to Indu who lives remembering Samara always. Kalana wins a scholarship in London for 7 years, leaving Indu breakdown. Kalana bids farewell to her. However, Kalana sees Samara in dream in airport while Indu dreams same in home. Kalana comes back to Indu, cancelling his scholarship as realizing he can't leave Indu. Finally, Indu and Kalana reunited.

== Cast ==
- Sandali Welikanne as Samara
- Kanchana Mendis as Indu
- Kamal Addararachchi as Dr. Kalana
- Buddhika Jayaratne as Shane
- Semini Iddamalgoda as Ruwina
- Buddhadasa Vithanarachchi as Indu's father
- Iranganie Serasinghe as Indu's paternal grandmother
- Seetha Kumari as a friend of Indu's grandmother
- Nelum Perera
- Soma Mawalage
- Nilanthi Wijesinghe as Kalana's mother
- Tyrone Michael as Kalana's father
- Milton Jayawardena
- Nita Fernando as Dancing teacher
- Ruwan Wickramasinghe
- Piyumi Shanika
