= Roger Seneviratne =

Sri Lankan actor

Roger Seneviratne රොජර් සෙනෙවිරත්න
- Born: Joseph Roger Seneviratne; May 5, 1962 (age 64); Colombo, Sri Lanka
- Education: St. Thomas' College, Kotte; Saint Joseph's College, Colombo
- Occupations: Actor, politician
- Years active: 1976–present
- Political party: National Freedom Front
- Other political affiliations: United People's Freedom Alliance
- Spouse: Vineetha Chandrasekara
- Father: Riyency Steinwall
- Awards: Best Actor 2008
- Website: Official Website

Joseph Roger Seneviratne (born 5 May 1962 as රොජර් සෙනෙවිරත්න) [Sinhala]), is an actor in Sri Lankan cinema, stage drama, and television as well as a singer and politician. He is best known for his roles in the teledrama Batti, Chathurya and as King Vijaya in the film Vijaya Kuweni.

== Personal life ==
He is a past pupil of St. Thomas' College, Kotte and Saint Joseph's College, Colombo. He is married to Vineetha Chandrasekara and the couple has one daughter Divya Vihari and one son Digantha.

His father Riyency Steinwall Seneviratne was a retired officer in Sri Lanka Ports Authority. He died in 2012 at the age of 84. Roger is the second of the family with nine siblings. His elder brother is Ralston and younger brother is Ralph. He has six sisters, Kristine, Darliya, Sharmane, Linet, Michel and Virginia.

== Acting career ==
His acting career started in 1976 when his friend Milton Jayasooriya introduced him to dramatist Sugathapala de Silva. He acted in de Silva's stage play Dunna Dunu Gamuwe and also worked as assistant stage manager of that play. Then he continued to act in stage plays such as Ediriweera Sarachchandra's Wessanthara, Veniceye Welenda, Twelfth Night and Mandaram Wehi. In 1986, he made a short play by translating Anton Chekhov's play Death of a Clerk as an experimental production. Then he translated Albert Kaman’s Caligula as Paswenna. The drama won eleven awards at the drama competition conducted by the National Youth Services Council. In 1993, Paswenna won awards for the best director and best production at the State Drama Festival.

Seneviratne also involved for international collaborations such as Italian productions Return to Bangalore Mother Theresa and French production Father Mannika.

His cinema career started in 1981 with a short film Parajithayo directed by Prasanna Amarasinghe. His maiden cinema appearance came through Christu Charithaya directed by Sunil Ariyaratne with a minor role. In 2001, he produced the television serial Santhrasaya which achieved the best rating for ITN in that year. His second production came through blockbuster hit Chathurya. His maiden television drama acting came through Irata Handana Mal. Under his production company 2R Creations, Seneviratne produced the television serials such as Ranarala and Wijayaba Kollaya.

=== Notable theater works ===
- Dunna Dunu Gamuwe
- Wessanthara
- Veniceye Welenda
- Twelfth Night
- Mandaram Wehi
- Paswenna
- Spartacus
- Avamanawa
- Men with Shadows
- Romaya Gini Gani 2

=== Notable television works ===
- Ada Sihinaya
- Ahanna Kenek Na
- Aparna
- Asirimath Daladagamanaya
- Athuru Paara
- Batti
- Chakraudhaya
- Charithayaka Paata Denna
- Chathurya
- Dahas Gawdura
- Damini
- Denuwara Manike
- Dhawala Kanya
- Diya Matha Liyami
- Doratu Rakinno
- Dumriya Andaraya
- Ektam Ge
- Gajaman Nona
- Gini Dalu Meda
- Ingammaruwa
- Irata Handana Mal
- Juraliya
- Kammiththa
- Kinduru Nadiya
- Kulavilokanaya
- Kulawanthayo
- Mindada
- Nadunana Puththu
- Nil Mal Viyana
- Nisala Diya Sasala Viya
- Once Upon a Time in Colombo
- Pata Veeduru
- Ran Bedi Minissu
- Sakisanda Suwaris
- Samanalayano
- Samudra Chaya
- Santhrase
- Satya
- Senuri
- Sudu Mal Kanda
- Ulamage Rathriya
- Wanabime Sirakaruwo
- Wara Mal
- Wijayaba Kollaya

== Beyond acting ==
He entered politics in 1978 when University of Peradeniya started a riot campaign to protest against White Paper introduced by the Education Department. He was a former councilor of the Western Provincial Council representing the National Freedom Front (NFF) in 2009. He resigned from the post in 2018. In 2014, he contested from United People’s Freedom alliance for the Western Province Council under United People’s Freedom Alliance. He took 44,011 votes and selected as a councilor for Western provincial council.

In 1986, he worked at Rupavahini Corporation to perform documentaries Ruwan Wassa and Diriya Duwa. Then he worked with Darmasena Pathiraja’s Nadunana Puthu.

== Arrest ==
In January 2002, Seneviratne assaulted with a club and caused injuries to Jayantha Mihira Wickremarachchi at Kalalgoda Road in Pannipitiya. Due to the assault, his leg fractured in three places. The rival initiated when Jayantha's wife befriended with Seneviratne and left him. She went live with Seneviratne in a house at Kalalgoda Road. The assault took place, when Jayantha went to that home to meet his wife. Seneviratne was accused had committed an offense under Section 317 of the Penal Code and arrested. After he fount to be guilty, Kaduwela magistrate sentenced Seneviratne to one year’s rigorous imprisonment. In 2014, Seneviratne was sentenced to two years rigorous imprisonment suspended for five years by Avissawella Magistrate.

In 2018, Seneviratne appeared before 12 June 2018 on Colombo Chief Magistrate's Court with other member of National Freedom Front. The case was filed against inconveniencing the public by protesting against the arrival of the United Nations Human Rights Commissioner Prince Zeid Raad Al Hussein outside the UN complex in Thunmulla in 2016.

== Filmography ==
Key
†	Denotes films that have not yet been released

Year	Film	Role	Ref.
1994	Loku Duwa		
1995	Ayoma		
1996	Sihina Deshayen		
1997	Duwata Mawaka Misa		
1997	Mother Teresa: In the Name of God's Poor	Protest leader	
1998	Channa Kinnari		
1998	Dorakada Marawa	Priyantha's friend	
1999	Pawuru Walalu	Ranjith	
2000	Thisaravi		
2001	Kinihiriya Mal	Vijitha	
2002	Mamath Geheniyak		
2002	Pathiniyakage Horawa		
2004	Sumedha		
2004	Mille Soya	Michael	
2005	Sulanga	Donald	
2010	Ira Handa Yata		
2010	Dakina Dakina Mal	Kumar	
2011	Dheewari		
2011	Angara Dangara	Mr. Wickramasinghe	
2012	Vijaya Kuweni	King Vijaya	
2013	Anithya	Derrick	
2013	Samanala Sandhawaniya	Revatha Dissanayake	
2014	Ranja	Sub Inspector	
2017	Ran Sayura	OIC	
2023	Ape Principal	Politician	
2024	Ridee Seenu		
2024	Gini Avi Saha Gini Keli 2		
TBA	Kuveni 2: Yakshadeshaya †	Randuna	
TBA	Gunananda Himi Migettuwatte †	Migel aka Gunananda Thero	
TBA	Shakthi †		
TBA	Sulanga Numba Avidin †		

== Awards and accolades ==
He has won several awards for the Best Actor, Supporting Actor and Popular Actor in many local television and theater award festivals.

=== Sumathi Awards ===
Year	Nominee / work	Award	Result
1996	Nadunana Puththu	Merit Award	Won
2008	Wanabime Sirakaruwa	Best Actor	Won
