= Veena Jayakody =

Sri Lankan actress

- වීණා ජයකොඩි
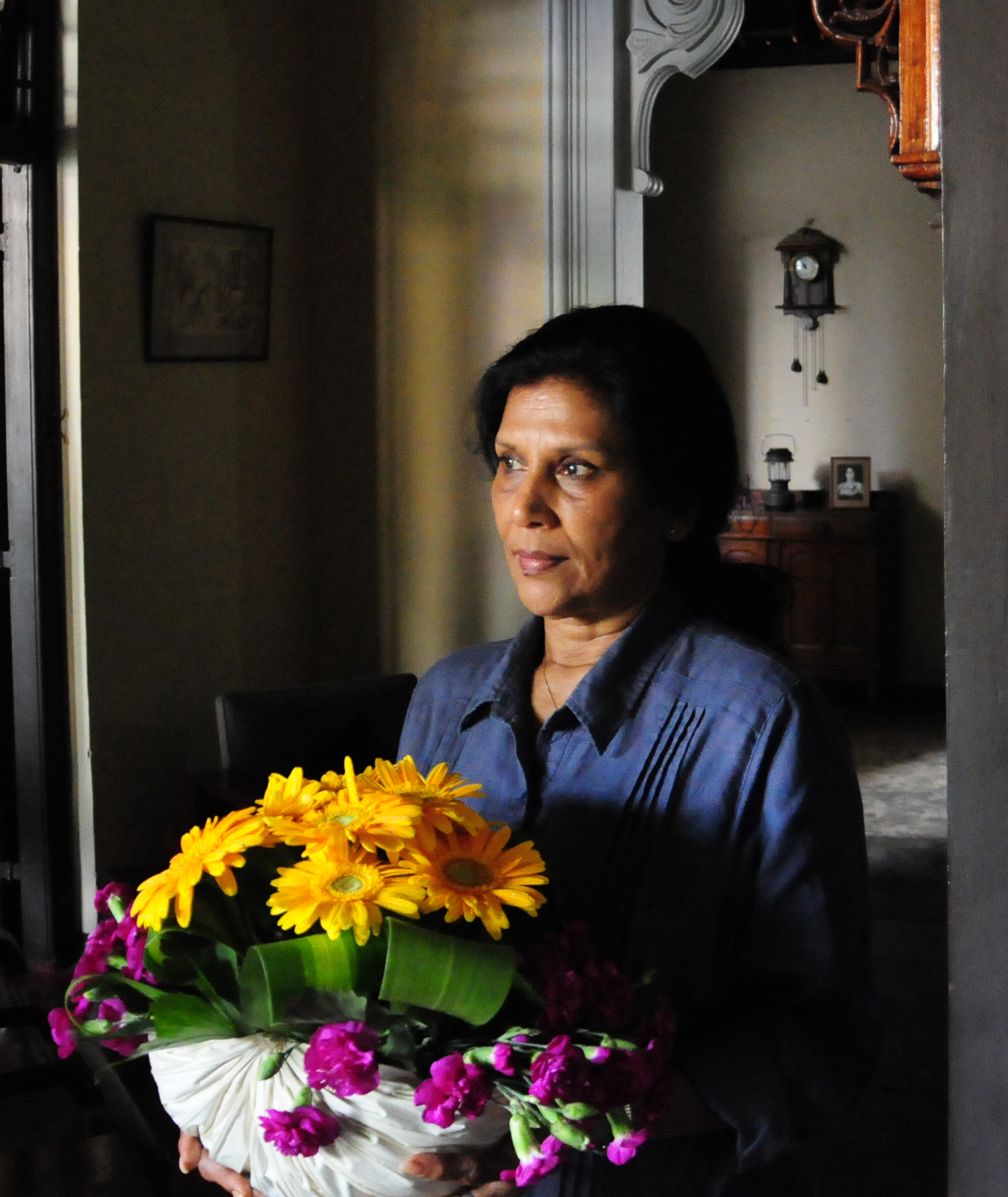
- Scene of Bahuchithawadiya Film
- Born: Virginia Sandhya Peiris; November 27, 1952 (age 73); Sri Lanka
- Education: Holy Family Convent, Bambalapitiya
- Occupations: Actress, Dramatist
- Years active: 1968–present
- Children: 3
- Parent: Rohini Jayakody (mother)
- Awards: Best Actress

Virginia Sandhya Peiris (born 27 November 1952), better known as Veena Jayakody (Sinhala: වීණා ජයකොඩි), is an actress in Sri Lankan cinema, stage drama and television. Jayakody started as a child artist and has played critically acclaimed roles in films Sagarayak Meda, Ra Manamali and Sarungalaya.

== Personal life ==
Veena Jayakody, born on 27 November 1952, is a Sri Lankan actress. Her mother, Rohini Jayakody, was a well-known Sri Lankan actress and film director. Veena received her education at Holy Family Convent in Bambalapitiya, Colombo.

Veena has three children: one daughter and two sons. Her eldest child, Anjana Ramachandran, was previously married to Srini Ramachandran. They have two children, Waishya and Kaushik.

Her eldest son, Chandu Doolwela, is married to Melanie D’Olivera. Together, they have three children: Jason, Tharaa, and Joshua.

Her youngest son, Sanjay Khan, is currently separated from his partner and has a daughter named Lilaah.

Veena’s family extends across three generations, with her children and grandchildren forming an important part of her family legacy.

== Acting career ==
Jayakody started her film career with Ahankara Sthree back in 1954, directed by A. B. Raj as a 5-month-old child with her mother. At the age of 12, Jayakody acted in 1968 film Hangi Hora directed by her mother Rohini Jayakody, where she acted as a dancer. At the age of 14, she acted in a Vesak drama Kohomada Wade. In the meantime, she studied dance under Pramila Kuruppu, Daya Nellampitiya and Rudrani Liyanage. Later she learned Kathakali dance from Sirimathi Rasadari. When she was a child, she acted as the daughter in the Vijaya Kuveni stage drama when her mother was 'Kuveni'. At school, she also played the role of 'Kisa' in the play 'Kundala Keshi'.

The she played the role of 'Gunapali' in the stage play Sivamma Dhanapala. After the tragic death of lead actress Rukmani Devi, Venna got the role of 'Sivamma'. After that she acted in plays such as Siripala Saha Ran Menika and Dwithwa. Later she won an award for the play Uruvisi. But in time and on long journeys, she had to retired from the stage when she got sick because of the lack of facilities.

Then she moved to television serials, started with the serial Aththa Bidei directed by Henry Jayasena. She later made a popular role 'Sudharma' in the critically acclaimed serial Doo Daruwo.

=== Notable teledramas ===
| Year | Teledrama | Role | Ref. |
|---|---|---|---|
| 2022 | Ahanna Kenek Na | Erin | |
| 2011 | Amarapuraya | | |
| | Bhavana - Akala Rathriya | | |
| | Bopath Sakkiya | | |
| | Eth Kanda Lihini | | |
| 2010 | Ganga Addara | Nimali's Mother | |
| | Giri Shikara Meda | | |
| | Hirusanda Maima | | |
| 1988 | Kande Gedara | Mayura | |
| | Kota Uda Mandira | | |
| | Kulavilokanaya | | |
| | Laabai Apple | | |
| 2020 | Kele Handa | | |
| 2007 | Oba Mageya | | |
| 1983 | Manik Nadiya Gala Basi | Sarada | |
| | Nadeeladiya | | |
| | Ruwata Ruwa | | |
| | Samanala Sihinaya | | |
| | Sanda Mudunata | Veena Menon | |
| 2012 | Sasandara | | |
| 2009 | Sihina Kumari | | |
| | Sudu Kapuru Pethi | | |
| 2009 | Wahinna Muthu Wassak | | |
| 2019 | Yuga Wilakkuwa | | |

== Filmography ==
Key
| † | Denotes films that have not yet been released |

| Year | Film | Role | Ref. |
|---|---|---|---|
| 1954 | Ahankara Sthree | Child Sukumal | |
| 1968 | Hangi Hora | Dancer | |
| 1969 | Kohomada Wade | | |
| 1978 | Deepanjali | | |
| 1978 | Apsara | | |
| 1979 | Geheniyak | Rupa | |
| 1979 | Minisun Athara Minisek | Vajira | |
| 1979 | Chuda Manikya | Sheryn Kodikara | |
| 1979 | Sarungale | Susheela | |
| 1979 | Muwan Palessa | Kekuli | |
| 1980 | Miyurige Kathawa | Miyuri | |
| 1981 | Thawalama | Khema | |
| 1981 | Sagarayak Meda | Deepa Moladanda | |
| 1981 | Bandura Mal | Uma | |
| 1982 | Re Manamali | Asha | |
| 1982 | Miss Mallika | | |
| 1984 | Shirani | | |
| 1987 | Sathyagrahanaya | Ramani | |
| 1988 | Gedara Budun Amma | Samanthi's mother | |
| 1991 | Sihina Ahase Wasanthaya | | |
| 1991 | Keli Madala | Samara Tennekoon | |
| 1991 | Suwandena Suwandak | | |
| 1992 | Sisila Gini Gani | Kumari Makalanda | |
| 1992 | Kulageya | Ramya | |
| 1993 | Yasasa | | |
| 1993 | Till Death Do Us Part | | |
| 1993 | Sargent Nallathambi | Juliana 'Julie' | |
| 1993 | Surabidena | Saama | |
| 1994 | Nohadan Landune | | |
| 1994 | Pawana Ralu Viya | | |
| 1994 | Aragalaya | Tamil dancer | |
| 1995 | Maruthaya | Geetha Wickramaratne | |
| 1996 | Soora Daruwo | | |
| 1996 | Anantha Rathriya | Loku Amma | |
| 1996 | Loku Duwa | | |
| 1997 | Mother Teresa: In the Name of God's Poor | Charu Ma | |
| 1997 | Vijayagrahanaya | | |
| 1997 | Sudu Akka | | |
| 1997 | Savithrige Rathriya | | |
| 1998 | Vimukthi | | |
| 1998 | Dorakada Marawa | Priyantha's mother | |
| 1999 | Salupata Ahasata 1 | Prema | |
| 1999 | Sura Yahana | | |
| 1999 | Theertha Yathra | Grace Sooriyabandara | |
| 2000 | Salupata Ahasata 2 | Prema | |
| 2001 | Kinihiriya Mal | Brothel receptionist | |
| 2001 | Kalu Sudu Mal | Pushpa | |
| 2002 | Rosa Patikki | | |
| 2002 | Surapurata Kanyaviyak | | |
| 2003 | Madre Teresa | Municipal Inspector Aoura | |
| 2005 | Asani Warsha | Granny | |
| 2006 | Nilambare | | |
| 2007 | Sikuru Hathe | OIC's wife | |
| 2008 | Ai Oba Thaniwela | | |
| 2009 | Juliya | Mrs. Lewke Bandara | |
| 2009 | Alimankada | Kamala's Mother | |
| 2010 | Ira Handa Yata | | |
| 2011 | Gamani | Dead rebel's mother | |
| 2011 | Dheewari | | |
| 2011 | Putha Mage Sooraya | | |
| 2012 | A Common Man | Vegetable vendor | |
| 2012 | Kusa Pabha | Queen Seelawathi | |
| 2012 | Wassane Senehasa | Pradeep's mother | |
| 2012 | Kurumittek Awilla | | |
| 2012 | Sihinaya Dige Enna | Shanthi "Sakunthala" de Silva | |
| 2012 | Prathiroo | Parwathi | |
| 2013 | Peeter One | Elizabeth Briganza | |
| 2015 | Bora Diya Pokuna | Doreen | |
| 2016 | Motor Bicycle | Rangana's Mother | |
| 2016 | Weerawarna | Suriyasingha's mother | |
| 2018 | Eka Dawasaka Api | Vimukthi's mother | |
| 2019 | Sangile | Punchi malli's wife | |
| 2020 | Suparna | Suparna's mother | |
| 2020 | Sheleena | | |
| 2023 | Guththila | King Brahmadutta's queen consort | |
| 2023 | Kandak Sema | | |
| 2024 | Minnu | | |
| 2024 | Buffalo Travels | | |
| 2025 | Ice Cream | | |
| 2025 | Bahuchithawadiya | Iranganie | |
| TBA | Monara Vilak † | | |
| TBA | The Wife † | | |

== Awards and accolades ==
She has won several awards at the local film festivals and television festivals.

=== Presidential Awards ===
| Year | Nominee / work | Award | Result |
|---|---|---|---|
| 1982 | Ra Manamali | Best Actress | Won |
