= Nilanjana (film) =

- Sinhala: නිලංජනා
- Directed by: Nalaka Withanage
- Written by: Nalaka Withanage
- Produced by: Arosha Fernando
- Starring: Himali Siriwardena; Palitha Silva; Sriyani Amarasena
- Cinematography: Indika Lakmal
- Distributed by: MPI Theatres
- Release date: 24 April 2017
- Country: Sri Lanka
- Language: Sinhala

Nilanjana (Sinhala: නිලංජනා) is a 2017 Sri Lankan Sinhala drama thriller film directed by Nalaka Withanage and produced by Arosha Fernando. It stars Himali Siriwardena and newcomer Kelum Kularatne in lead roles along with Sriyani Amarasena and Anusha Damayanthi. It is the 1274th Sri Lankan film in the Sinhala cinema.

== Cast ==
- Himali Siriwardena as Nilanjana
- Kelum Kularatne as Yomal
- Palitha Silva as Dananjaya
- Sriyani Amarasena as Samantha
- Anusha Damayanthi as Ayesha
- Manel Wanaguru as Shirani
- Bandula Vithanage as Densil
- Mahendra Weerarathne as Ayal
- Iresha Asanki as Ruvini
- Chulakshi Ranathunga as Amanda
