= Kotu =

Kotu may refer to:

- KOTU-LP, a low-power radio station (107.7 FM) licensed to Riddle, Oregon, US
- Kotu Island, Tonga
- Kotu, Gambia, a city in the Gambia
- Kings of the Universe, the men's team on season 8 of The Apprentice (US)
- Acronym for King of the Universe.
