= Vasantha Obeysekera =

Sri Lankan film director (1937–2017)

- Born: 29 December 1937; Mathugama, Sri Lanka
- Died: 8 April 2017 (aged 79)
- Occupation: Film Director
- Years active: 1967–2017
- Notable work: Walmathwuwo, Palangetiyo, Dadayama, Kedapathaka chaayaa, Maaruthaya, Dorakadamaaraawa, Theertha yaathraa, Salelu warama, AsiniVarsha, Aaganthukayaa

Vasantha Obeysekera (1937–2017), was a Sri Lankan film director and screenwriter.

== Early life and career ==
Kala Keerthi Vasantha Obeysekera who was regarded as one of the foremost film makers in the 70s decade graduated from the University of Ceylon in 1962. He served on the Editorial Staff of the Associated Newspapers of Ceylon Limited from 1964 to 1970. In addition to his editorial work, Obeysekera wrote several short stories during this period.

Obeysekera entered the film industry with Sath Samudura in 1967 which he co-wrote and worked on as assistant director; it was Sri Lanka's entry at the Moscow International Film Festival. In 1971 he was awarded a certificate in Cinematography by the Comité de libération du cinéma français.

== 1970s ==
In the 1970s Obeysekera wrote and directed Ves Gaththo ("Masked Men") (1970), Valmathuwo ("Lost Ones") (1976), Diyamanthi ("Diamond") (1977) and Palangetiyo ("Grasshoppers") (1979). Palangetiyo won the Presidential Film Awards for Best Screenplay, Best Director and Best Film.

== 1980s ==
1983's Dadayama ("The Hunt") also won the Presidential awards for Best Screenplay, Best Director and Best Film. It was a commercial success as well. Obeysekera made Kedapathaka Chaya ("Reflections on the Mirror") in 1989 after a five-year break.

== 1990s and 2000s ==
In the late-'90s, Obeysekera made Maruthaya ("The Storm") (1995), Dorakada Marawa ("Death at the Doorstep") (1998) and Theertha Yathra ("Pilgrimage") (1999). These also secured several OCIC and Presidential Awards.

Salelu Warama ("Web of Love"), Agni Warsha ("Rains of Fire"), Aganthukaya ("The Stranger"), and Sewwandhi were made in the 2000s.

== Filmography ==
He has directed 13 films across many dramatic genres.

- No. denotes the Number of Sri Lankan film in the Sri Lankan cinema.

Released date	No.	Film
12 December 1970	234	Wesgaththo
2 April 1976	339	Walmathwuwo
28 May 1976	342	Diyamanthi
27 April 1979	417	Palagatiyo
20 May 1983	558	Dadayama
24 March 1989	687	Kedapathaka Chaya
9 June 1995	831	Maruthaya
2 December 1998	904	Dorakada Marawa
1 October 1999	922	Theertha Yathra
17 October 2002	990	Salelu Warama
7 April 2005	1048	Asani Warsha
7 December 2006	1080	Sewwandi
31 May 2007	1087	Aganthukaya

== Death ==
He died on 8 April 2017 in a private hospital in Colombo.
