= List of film and television scores composed by Dinesh Subasinghe =

This is a list of musical scores composed by Dinesh Subasinghe for films and television. The list also includes musical scores prepared for documentaries and theatrical productions.

== Film scores ==
Movie	Director	Language	Notes	Production year	Released
Sihinaya Dige Enna (සිහිනය දිගේ එන්න )	Chandrathna Mapitigama	Sinhala/Tamil	. Theme Song was nominated for 10 best film songs for 2013 on Derana Lux Film Awards (2013)	2011	2012,Music.lk, (1175 th Sri Lankan Movie)
Parawarthana (පරාවර්තන)	Jayanath Gunawardhana	Sinhala		2011	2014 January official website films.lk (1200th Sri Lankan Movie)
WarigaPojja	Thushara Thenakon	Sinhala	Nominated for 3rd Derana lux awards best Original music score & won the award for most popular Film song Award 2015.	2013	Released date 20 March 2014. Produced by 'Kantha samupakara Bank' of Sri Lanka.(1204 th Sri Lankan Movie)
Parapura (පරපුර)	Cleatus Mendis	Sinhala	.It was a huge production but failed in the box office, had a good response when it was aired on Hiru TV	2011-2012	Released in 2014,(1209 th Sri Lankan Movie)
Kalpanthe Sihinayak (කල්පාන්තයේ සිහිනයක්)	Channa Perera	Sinhala	Theme song and theme music only	2011	Released in 2014 official website, 1215 th Sri Lankan Movie
Ho Gana Pokuna (Singing pond)	Indika Ferdinado	Sinhala	Won the best Original Score Award & the most popular film song award at the 4th Derana Sun silk film Awards ceremony 2016. Won the Most Popular film song Award at the 2nd Hiru Golden Film Awards 2016.Score & Raata Pena kiri Hawa song was nominated for the best original score & best movie song of the year	2012-2013	2015 Official website. won the 2016 signis award for best music direction and won the jury merit award at the Sarasavi filme awards 2016(1241 st Sri Lankan Movie)
Dr. Nawariyan	Ranjan Ramanayaka	Sinhala	Based on 'Munna Bhai MBBS Movie	2017	Vocals by Uresha Ravihari, Hector Dias, Lantra & Ranjan Ramanayaka, Lyrics by Chandradasa Fernando & Sajith V Chathuranga
Yugathra	Channa Perera	Sinhala	vocals by Sanka Dineth Chethana Ranasinghe and Uresha Ravihari	2019	2023
Guththila (film)	Sanath Abesekara	Sinhala	Produced by Haren Nagodawithana. Songs has been sung by Edward Jayakody, Akila Dhanudara with Inoka Ahangama. It was an experimental music score	2019	2023
Thaththa	Prasad Samarathunga	Sinhala	Theme song has written by Shany Anthony.sung by Upeka Nirmani and Nalin Perera	2022	2023
Sri Wickrama	Mohan Niyaz	Sinhala	Theme song only	2022	2023
Sri Siddha	Sarath Weerasekara	Sinhala	Background score only	2022-2023	2024
Devi Kusumasana	Jayantha Chandrasiri	Sinhala	2025	2023	Produced by Lyca productions, songs and background score
Agni Jaya	Manchana Peries	Sinhala	2026	2026	backgroung score only

Post Production

Movie	Director	Language	Notes	Production year	Released
Uyanate Mal Genna (උයනට මල් ගේන්න)	Chandrathna Mapitigama	Sinhala		2009-2010	
Surangana Lowin Awilla (සුරංගනා ලොවින් ඇවිල්ලා)	Suneth Malinga Lokuhewa	Sinhala		2011-2012	
Preethy and Joy (ප්රීති ඇන්ඩ් ජෝයි)	Chandrathna Mapitigama	Sinhala	Production stopped	2011-2012	
Adara Pujasanaya	Alaric Lional Fernando	Sinhala	Bgm only	2012	
Chamathka	Channa Perera	Sinhala	Production stopped after the Murat ceremony due to a production problem	2012	Vocals By Uresha Ravihari, Chethana Ranasinghe, Theekshana Anuradha, Lyrics by Ajantha Ranasinghe, Sunil Wimalaweera and Bandara Ahaliyagoda
Randhoni	Priyantha Samarakone	Sinhala		2016	Produced By Jagath Wijenayaka
Sulanga Sara wadi	Nihal Fernando	Sinhala		2017	
Sama asama(සම අසම)	Grace Ariyawimal	Sinhala	2025	2017	Song and background score
Meedum Tharanaya	Lakshmon Pushpakumara	Sinhala		2024	Post production

== Television series ==
=== Mini series ===
==== 2004-2010 ====
Name	Director	TV station	Production year	Released	Language	Notes
Hummane (හුම්මානේ)	Chandrathna Mapitigama	Swarnavahini	2003-2004	2004	Sinhala language	song has sung by Nelu Adhikari, Dee R Cee members, song lyrics by Chandrathna Mapitigama
Shoba (ශෝබා )	Chandrathna Mapitigama	Independent Television Network	2004	2008	Sinhala language	Vocals by Indika Upamali & Manjula Martis, lyrics by Chandrathna Mapitigama
Sara Saha Suba (සරා සහ සුබා)	Laxmon Pushpakumara	Swarnavahini	2004-2005	2005	Sinhala language	
Ikbithi (ඉක්බිති)	Chandrathna Mapitigama	Sri Lanka Rupavahini Corporation	2005	2006	Sinhala language	First TV series based on tsunami, song has sung by W.D.Ariyasinghe, lyrics by Chandrathna Mapitigama
Saradha Sugathan (සැරද සුගතන්)	Chandrathna Mapitigama	Independent Television Network	2005	2007	Sinhala language	Vocals by Bandula Wijeweera. lyrics By chandrathna Mapitigama
Kiripabalu Wila (කිරි පබළු විල)	Chandrathna Mapitigama	Independent Television Network	2005	2006	Sinhala language	theme song was nominated for Best female vocals at the Riagam tele awards, vocals by Deepika Priyadharshani Peries, Lyrics by Chandrathna Mapitigama
Pinsara Dosthara (පින්සර දොස්තර)	sunil costa	Independent Television Network	2005	2011	Sinhala language	Sri Lankan version of 'Strange Case of Dr Jekyll and Mr Hyde by Robert Louis Balfour Stevenson, won the Best Music Director Award at the Sumathi teledrama Awards 2012
Siri Sirimal (සිරි සිරිමල්),	sunil costha	Sri Lanka Rupavahini Corporation	2005-2006,	2006-2007	Sinhala language	Won the Best Music Director award in Signis Awards (Sri Lanka). This TV series was based on Tom Sawyer by Mark Twain. Vocals by Madawa Senivirathna with children's choir & Dee R Cee Members
Pura Handapura (පුර හඳ පුර)	Gamini Bandara		2005	production has not been released due to the coz of clash between investors	Sinhala language/Tamil language	Song vocals Sung by Nelu Adhikaree & Uresha Ravihari
Pethi Ahulana Mala (පෙති අහුලන මල)	Chandrathna Mapitigama	Swarnavahini	2007	2007	Sinhala language	theme song sung by Prabodha Kariyakarawana, lyrics by chandrathna Mapitigama
Dulangana (දුලන්ගනා)	Chandrathna Mapitigama	Independent Television Network	2007	2010	Sinhala language	Song has sung by Keerthy Pasquel, Lyrics by Chandrathana Mapitigama
Sundarai Premaya(සුන්දරයි ප්රේමය)	Chandrathna Mapitigama	Sirasa TV	2007-2009	2010	Sinhala language	Song Vocals by Sahil Jith Singh, Priya Andrews & KM Music Conservatory, lyrics by Chandrathna Mapitigama
Sherlock Holmes (ශර්ලොක් හොම්ස්)	Sunil costa/Sanjaya Nirmal	Sri Lanka Rupavahini Corporation	2007	,> 2008	Sinhala language	Sri Lankan version of Sherlock Holmes by Sir Arthur Conan Doyle.Main vocals by Praboda Kariyakarawana & Dee R Cee members
Punchi Hapannu (Ran Hawadiya) (රන් හවඩිය)	Channa Perera	Independent Television Network	2008	2008	Sinhala language	BGM only
Sihina Wasanthayak (සිහින වසන්තයක්)	Sunil Costa, Sanjaya Nirmal, Saranga Mendis	Sirasa TV	2008	2008-2009	Sinhala language/Tamil language	, This TV series was very popular and it got one of the best ratings for a TV series in Sri Lanka. This plot was based on India's Autograph (2010 film).song vocals by Amal Perera, Praboda Kariyakarawana, Dinesh Subasinghe, Chinthaka Malith, Meena Prasadhini, Dinesh Tharanga.Lyrics by Kalum Srimal, Judith Desilva
Ahankara Nagaraya (අහංකාර නගරය)	Joseph Jerome	Independent Television Network	2008-2009	2009	Sinhala language	Vocals by Meena Prasadhini, Senanga Disanayaka
Siwpath Rana (සිව්පත් රෑන)	Sriyani Amarasena	Derana TV	2009	2009	Sinhala language	vocals by Samantha Perera, Lyrics by Kularathna Ariyawansa
Hithata Wahal Wimi (හිතට වහල් විමි)	Mohan Niyaz	Sirasa TV	2010	2010-2011	Sinhala language	Introduced rock music to Sri Lankan TV series. Song vocals by Arjuna Rookantha, Shanika Madhumali
Rosaliya (රොසලියා)	Sanjaya Nirmal		2008-2010		Sinhala language	
Shwetha (ශ්වේතා)	Chandrathna Mapitigama		2007		Sinhala language/ Malayalam	
Parawi Rana (පරවි රෑන)	Chandrathna Mapitigama		2007		Sinhala language	
Rakhunsaraya (රකුන්සැර)	Sanjaya Nirmal		2010		Sinhala language	

==== 2011-2016 ====
Name	Director	TV station	Production year	Released	Language	Notes
Pini Aga Pulingu (පිනි අග පුලිඟු)	Gihan Rohana	Sirasa TV	2011	2011	Sinhala language	Lyrics by Tharaka Wasalamudaliarachi Vocals by Kasun Primal & Thrishala Wijethunga
Suba (සුබා)	Saman Kumara Liyanage	Swarnavahini	2011	2011-2012	Sinhala language	Vocals by Shashika Nisansala & Kasun Primal& Thrishala Wijethunga, Lyrics by Wasantha Kumara Kobawaka
Ayemath Adaren (ආයෙමත් ආදරෙන්)	Suneth Mlinga lokuhewa	Independent Television Network	2011-2012	2016	Sinhala language	Vocals by Kasun Primal & Thrishala Wijethunga
Sarangana (සාරන්ගනා)	Shafraz Mohomad	Sirasa TV	2012	2013	Sinhala language	Song has sung by Charmika sirimanne, Shanika wanigasekara & Thrishala Wijethunga
Parami	Joseph Jerome, Mayadunne Bandara	Rupavahini	2012	2014	Sinhala language	Produced and main role performed by Parliament minister Reginald corray.theme song written by Reginald corray n vocals by Uresha Ravihare & Minister Reginald corray
Sansara Sakmana	Shafraz Mohomad	Sirasa TV	2012	2012-2013	Sinhala language	Song vocals by Dumal Warnakulasuriya &Thrishala Wijethunga
Suliya	Chandrathna Mapitigama				Sinhala language	Pre Production
Verona	Sriyani Amarasena		2013		Sinhala language	Bgm only, Pre Production
Makulu Dal	Nihal Fernando	ITN	2013	2013-14	Sinhala language	Produced by Vinoja Nilanthi and the Lyrics by Ajantha Ranasinghe
Akadawariya	Janaka Chaminda	ITN	2013	2014-	Sinhala language	Lyrics By Rohana Madampalla Vocals by Uresha Ravihare & Thrishala Wijethunga, Uresha was nominated for best voalcist in Raigma tele awards 2016
Ahankara Sthriya	Denzil		2013		Sinhala language	Production stopped after Directors Death
Mahinsa	Joseph Jerome		2013		Sinhala language	Vocals by Thrishala Wijethunga
Ahala Maha Nikinniya	Sameera Hasun	TNL	2013	2014	Sinhala language	Vocals by Dumal Warnakulasuriya & Thrishala Wijethunga, plot based on a Folk Sri Lankan God 'Ayyanayaka'
Aathma	Janaka Chaminda & Gayan Wickramathilaka	Swarnavahini	2013-2014	2014	Sinhala language	Produced by Gayan Wickramathilaka & Chathurika Pieries.Lyrics by Sajith V chathuranga & Gayan Wickramathilaka. Vocals by Theekshana Anuradha & Thrishala Wijethunga
Sihina viman	Thishula Deepa Thambawita	Independent Television Network	2014	2016	Sinhala language	Lyrics by Prof.Prof. Ajantha Ranasinghe.Vocals by Theekshana Anuradha & Thrishala Wijethunga. Produced by Vinoja Nilanthi
Sathgunawathla	Chandrarathna Mapitigama		2014		Sinhala language	Pre-Production
Keetaya 7	Chandrarathna Mapitigama		2014		Sinhala language	Pre-Production
Susumata Pawa Rahasin	Saranga Mendis	Sirasa TV	2014	2016	Sinhala language	Vocals By Kasun Pasquel & Thrishala Wijethunga, Lyrics by Somalatha Herath Manike.Produced by Plus one productions
Sambanda Babanis	Chandrarathna Mapitigama	Hiru TV	2014	2014	Sinhala language	Vocals by Bandula Wijewera, lyrics by Chandrathna Mapitigama
Sihina Soya	Saranga Mendis	Sirasa TV	2014	2016	Sinhala language	Lyrics By Ariyawansha Kulathilaka. Vocals by Chethana Ranasinghe. produced by Plus one Productions
Nirmaaya	Chandrarathna Mapitigama	Siyatha TV	2014	2015	Sinhala language	
Wedha Mudiyanse	Gihan Rohana		2014		Sinhala language	Pre Production
Devi Sugalaa	Kelum Palitha Mahirahna	Independent Television Network	2014	2016	Sinhala language	Historical plot based on Aunt of Great king Parakramabahu
Dawala Kandullu	Sampath Sri Roshan	Rupavahini	2014	2014	Sinhala language	Plot based on a true story.Massacre in 1989, Theme song was sung by Amarasiri Peiries.Lyrics done By Rathna Sri Wijesinghe
Bawa Chakra	Chanika Perera	ITN	2014	2016	Sinhala language	Plot based on Buddhism and Angam Fighting,
Samanala Pihatu			2014		Sinhala language	Lyrics by Chrisina Fernando, Vocals by Roshen Fernando & Thrishala Wijethunga
Meedhumen Eha	Rohana Samaradhivakara	Swarnavahini	2014	2015	Sinhala language	Vocals by Thrishala Wijethunga
Samanalun Piyambai	Saranga Mendis, Rohana Samaradivakara	Swarnavahini	2014	2015	Sinhala language	Lyrics By Wasantha Kumara Kobawaka, Vocals by Dewmini Fernando & Kavindu Omesha
BawaHarana	Janaka Chaminda	Independent Television Network	2015	2017	Sinhala language	
Duwili Bonikki	Gihan Rohana		2016	2016	Sinhala language	Pre Production
Dedunai Aadare	Saranga Mendis	Derana TV	2015-2016	2016	Sinhala language	Un Credited participation, Subasinghe has given musical tracks for the BGM & main score has done by Lassana Jayasekara
Dedunu Maya	Sanjaya Nirmal	Hiru TV	2016	2016	Sinhala language	Theme song Only.Lyrics by Amila Thenuwara.Vocals by Dewmini Fernando, Dunithi Kawinya, Chamidu Kaushal, Bhanuka Senevirathna
Nisala Diya Suli	Sujith Parana Witharana		2016	2016	Sinhala language	Pre Production
Eka Gei Minissu	Shivaguru Nadhan	Rupavahini/Siyatha Tv	2016	2017	Sinhala language	Theme Song sung by Deepika Priyadarshani Peiries, Lyrics by Bandara Ahaliyagoda, Script by Somaweera Senanayaka
Dewliye	G.Nandasena	Swarnavahini	2016	2017	Sinhala language	Theme song by Hiru Sandu Tharumuthu Maddumarachi and script written by Mahesh Rathsara Madhumarachi, Vocals By Sanuka Wickramasinghe
Sulanga Sey maa	Kumudu Nishantha		2016		Sinhala language	Pre Production
Pahasaraa	Sandun Rajakaruna	Sirasa TV	2016	2017	Sinhala language	Produced by Niwala Productions, Theme song sung by Kushani Sandareka & Shivantha Fernando

== 2017 -2025 ==
Name	Director	TV station	Production year	Released	Language	Notes
Aadara Dadayama	Janaka Mallimarachi		2017		Sinhala language	Produced by Dr.Jagath Wijenayaka.Theme song sung by Nirosha Virajini.Lyrics by Buddhini Jayawardhana, Kelum Srimal
Bawathma	Channa Perera		2017		Sinhala language	Theme song only
Dankuda Banda	PriyanthaSamarakone, Nishantha	Sirasa TV	2017	2018	Sinhala language	Children's teledrama.dinesh was in the cast as the 'thale Maser'
Lassanai Adare	Chanika Perera		2017	2018	Sinhala language	Produced by Shiromika Fernando, Theme song sung By Soorya Dayaruwan & Uresha Ravihari, Lyrics by Sidney Chandrasekara
Sudu andagena kalu awidin	Sunil Costa	Rupavahini	2018	2019	Sinhala language	had a huge public response and had some great response for its music, won the most popular teledrama of the year in SumathI Awards 2019
Palingu Piyapath	Benet Rathnayaka	Independent Television Network	2018	2019-2020	Sinhala language	Theme song was sung by Dumal Warnakula
Maya Raajini	Priyantha Samarakone	Sirasa TV	2018	2019-2020	Sinhala language	Theme song sung by Nanda Malini, written by Proff.Sunil Ariyarathna
Manu Saththu	Sumudu Wellalage		2019		Sinhala language	post production
Hithuwakkari	G Nandasena	Independent Television Network	2020	2021-22	Sinhala language	BGM only.
Red Light	Sandaruwan Jayawickrama, Siva gurunadan	Ceyflyx	2020	2020	Sinhala language	web Tv series for CeyFliX web channel. Theme song sung by Rooni & Asha Edirisinghe
Kiss	Sandaruwan Jayawickrama	Ceyflix	2020	2020	Sinhala language	web Tv series for CeyFliX web channel, collaborative work with Thilina Ruhunuge (BGM only)
Snap	Pasindu Perera	swarnavahini	2020	2021	Sinhala language	
Can You Hear Me? (2020 TV series)	Sunil Costa	Rupavahini	2020	2020	Sinhala language	Theme song sung by Chandumal (C plus) & upeka Nirmani
Kuncha Naada	Christi Shelton Fernando	2023	2020	Sirasa TV	Sinhala language	Plot based on the conflict between Elephants and human beings, theme song sung by Kapila Poogalarachi
No 9	Charith Abesinghe	Independent Television Network	2021	2022	Sinhala language	
Teacher Amma	Sudattha Thilakasiri	Swarnavahini	2021	2021	Sinhala language	Theme song sung by Upeka Nirmani, Kovida Ghandhara Kularathna, Minudi Saesha Kularathna, Lyrics by Kelum Srimal
Adare Githayak	Sudatta Thilakasiri	Monara TV	2022	2023	Sinhala language	Post production
Panam Bnadina Gas	Sunil Costa		2022		Sinhala language	Post production
magema do	G Nandasena	ITN	2025	2025	Sinhala language	Theme song sung by Ashan Fernando
LBW	Supun Rathnayaka	ITN	2025	2025	Sinhala language	

== 2026 ==
Name	Director	TV station	Production year	Released	Language	Notes
Mistake	Prasad Samarathunga	Rupahala.com.au	2025	2026	Sinhala language	BGM only.Web Tv series
Deiyangema Pihitayi	Prageeth De Silva	ITN	2026	2026	Sinhala language	BGM only
Sari(සාරි)	Priyantha Sri	ITN	2026		Sinhala language	A script by Gayani Asinsala Piyadigama

== Single episode television dramas and television films ==
Name	Director	Media	production year	released	Language	Notes
Ridmaye Adaharaya (රිද්මයේ අඩහැරය )	Anura Mapitigama	Independent Television Network	2005	2007	Sinhala language	Based on Christmas, Song vocals by Sonali Aberathna
Nathalai Gawalenai (නත්තල සහ ගවලෙන)	Rajive Annanda	Sri Lanka Rupavahini Corporation	2005	2005	Sinhala language	Based on Christmas
Hansa Wilapaya (හන්සවිලාපය)(Tele Film)	Daya Alwis		2005	Production was stopped	Sinhala language	Theme based on human sexuality
Ethera Weema (එතෙරවීම )	charith Kiriala		2006	canceled	Sinhala language	Buddhist Theme
Iranama (ඉරණම )	Priyankara Silva		2009	canceled	Sinhala language	Buddhist Theme
Gomman Yamaya (ගොම්මන් යාමය)	Chandrathna Mapitigama		2008		Sinhala language	Horror Series
වෙසක් කාලේ	Mark Fernando		2008	canceled	Sinhala language	Buddhist Theme
Sambawiya (සම්බ විය)	Chandrathna Mapitigama	Sirasa TV	2010	2010	Sinhala language	Theme based on Christmas
Devana Upatha (දෙවන උපත)	Saman Kumara Liyanage	Swarnavahini	2011	2011	Sinhala language	Theme based on Christmas
Hiru Dutu Malak (හිරු දුටු මලක්)(Tele Film)	Cleatus Mendis	Public exhibition	2011	2011	Sinhala language	Theme based on 'Cancer Healing, vocals by Amarasiri Peries & Deepika Priyadarshai, Lyrics by Nandana Wickramage
Wes Gatho (වෙස් ගත්තෝ)(Tele Film)	Anura Srinath	Public Exhibition	2011	2011	Sinhala language	Bgm only
Giju Lihini	Suranga Katugampala	Fresh TV	2012			Web TV series (Fresh TV)
Nathal Geethaya	Saman Kumara Liyanage	Swarnavahini	2012	2012	Sinhala language	Christmas tele
Jesu Chrithus Yuga Peraliya	Sunil Costa & cleatus Mendis	Sirasa TV	2013	2013	Sinhala language	Christian passion play Teledrama Produced by Pream Fernando, Dinesh Subasinghe created music and worked as the Assistant Director and played the Herod Antipas's Role.this is the 3rd historic screen play produced from Sri Lanka based on Jesus Christ's life story
Balaporothuwa	Chandrathna Mapitigama	Derana TV	2012	2012	Sinhala language	Christmas tele
Gasrities	Isuru Anjula Perera				Sinhala language	Theme song sung by Nanda Malini
Honda Putha	Anura Waragoda				Sinhala language	Script by Sathischandra Edirisinghe for world Children's day
Arumayaki eya	Rev.Fr.Prageeth Dishan	Social media & for You Tube			Sinhala language	Theme song Sung by Dinesh Subasinghe & Upeka Desilva
Adaraye Ulpatha	Nirmal Peries	Spiritual networking			Sinhala language	Theme song Sung by Lesley Thomas, plot based on mother Mary and the miraculous power of Rosary

== Documentaries ==
- 'Dutu Nodutu' by Hemanalin Karunarathna for Swarnavahini
- 'Jana Sarana' Soma Edirisinghe for Swarnavahini
- 'Saving Energy' by Jayantha Chandrairi
- 'Hethuwadhi Wimarshana' On Rupavahini
- 'Suwanda Nonasena Mal by Chandrathna mapitigama
- 'Pubilis' by Bertram Nihal
- 'Wonder of Asia' by Jayanath Gunawardana
- 'Nature Documentary' By Minuwan
- 'Dalanda Maligawa'( The Temple of the Tooth)
- 'Dambulla Rajamaha Viharaya' Documentary By Susara Dinal Silva
- 'Se Helaye Manawa Wanshaya' on ITN

== Television and radio musical series ==
- Haa Haa pura on Swarnavahini 2005-2006
- Hansa vila on Swarnavahini (22 programs ) 2006
- Gee TV on Swarnavahini (5 programs) January 2006
- Maatra on Derana TV (4 programs) 2005-2007
- Sadu Naada on Swarnavahini (3 programs) 2005, 2006, 2008
- Love Dreams on Yfm (35 programs) 2007
- Auto Plus on Sirasa TV (2 programs) 2008
- Sikurada Rae on Derana TV (16 programs) 2008-2009
- Feeling of youth on Rupavahini (4 programs) 2014-2016
- Saara Prabha Gira on SLBC (Welanda Sewaya)-(8 Programs)
- Tone Poem On Rupavahini 2017-2018, 2019 (58 Programs)
- Baila Sade on Rupavahini 2020-2021 (27 Programs)
- Imorich tunes on Sirasa TV(11 Programs) 2023

== Main stage dramas ==
=== Passion Play ===
- Nadu Theenduwa (open air) - Peter Wellambage (1999)
- Kurusiya Matha Miyadunemi (open air ) - Peter Wellambage (2000)
- Kurusiya Matha Miyadunemi 2 (open air) - Peter Wellambage (2001)
- Aho Mage Senageni 3 (open air) - Alexius Fernando (2003)
- Aho Mage Senageni 4 (open air) - Alexius Fernando (2007)
- Nagoda Passion Play (open air) - Nevil Fernando (2007)
- Bolawalana Passion Play (open air) - Peter Wellambage (2007)
- Duwa Historic Passion Play (Theater) - Clement Fernando (2008)
- Seeduwa Scheme Church Good Friday passionplay - Sanjaya Nirmal(2011)
- Sri Kurusawalokanaya Passion Play (open air) - Peter Wellambage (2012)
- Aho Mage Senageni 5 (open air) Katana - Corroborated work(2013)
- Dalupotha St. Anthonie's Church Passion play - Krishantha Warnakula(2013/2014)
- Duwa Christmas play (Sirasa TV Nathal Kalapaya) (2015) - Clement Fernando
- Duwa Historic Passion Play (open Air)(2016) - Clement Fernando
- Aho Mage Senegeni (open air theater) - Corroborated work (2018)

=== Theater ===
- Mang Honda Lamaya (theater) - Richard Manamudali (2001)
- Ananga Bambaru (theater) - Richard Manamudali (2001)
- - Nevil De Silva (2002)
- Memories of a Monkey Boy (theater) - Wolfgang Stange and Anoja Weerasinghe (2007),
- Siwamma Danapala (Theater) - Tennyson Cooray (2012)
- Beneetage Thatha (Theater) -Kingsly lowes
