= Dinesh Subasinghe discography =

- Studio albums: 3
- Soundtrack albums: 1
- Music videos: 7

This is the discography of Dinesh Subasinghe, a Sri Lankan composer, violinist, instrumentalist, music director and record producer, who has released three solo studio albums. Subasinghe has also released seven music videos, including four with his music group Dee R Cee.

== Studio albums ==
Title	Album details
Rawan Nada	Released: 25 March 2009; Label: Tharanga Records; Format: CD; Producer:
The Buddha (Karuna Nadee) - River of Kindness	Released: 18 July 2012; Label: Maharaja Entertainment; Formats: Producer:
Feel My Heart	Released: 11 August 2012; Label: Maharaja Entertainment; Format: CD; Producer:

== Soundtrack albums ==
Title	Album details
Sihina Wasanthayak soundtrack	Released:11 August 2009; Label: Maharaja Entertainment; Format: CD; Producer:
Ho Gana Pokuna Soundtrack & songs	Released: 26 January 2016; Label: Maharaja Entertainment, Format: CD; Producer:

== Digital albums and works ==
- Kuweni Lounge (Vol. I) - Niru Mendis, Chithral Somapala - 2013

== Music videos ==
- "Monalisa" - Dee R Cee - 2004
- "Sonduru Nimanaya" - Dee R Cee with Shanika Wanigasekara - 2005
- "Mey Adarayada" - Dee R Cee feat. Sonali - 2006
- "Ira Bahinia Handawe" - Dee R Cee - 2007
- "Sihinaya dige enna" (theme song)
- "E Kale the one" - Charmika Sirimanne, Ranushka Fernando
- "Huru Buhuti" - Chooty-Billy Fernando, Chooty and 2forty band

== Album contributions ==
- Rhyme Skool with Katrina Kaif - A. R. Rahman, Katrina Kaif, KM Music Conservatory
