= Kingri (string instrument) =

Indian string instrument

String instrument
- Classification: String instruments
- Hornbostel–Sachs classification: (Composite chordophone sounded with a bow)
- Developed: Ancient India

Related instruments
- Ravanahatha; Rebab; Violin

Kingri is a chordophone bowed string instrument (string spike fiddle) originating from the Indian subcontinent, similar to Rabab and Ravanastron. It has a resonator box of unglazed pottery, through which a stick is passed to function as the neck.

== History ==
The Kingri is mentioned in the Sanskrit epic Mahabharata, in many Ancient Indian Brahmin's tales. and in Punjab's folk music. The kingri is also used in traditional death ceremonies, marriages and religious festivals in Andhra Pradesh and Maharashtra.

== Texture and timbre ==
The kingri first appeared as a single string instrument and has since evolved into a three string instrument. A long piece of bamboo is inserted into the fingerboard with three pegs. The strings on the bow are made by using three tufts of horse hair or Goongaru. The strings on the instrument were originally made of animal gut, but modern day Indian gypsies typically use low quality steel strings instead, resulting in more vibrato and lending the instrument a sound similar to the violin.

== Modern use ==
Sri Lankan composer Dinesh Subasinghe used the kingri on the album Rawan Nada as well as for performing folk music. In 2007, Subasinghe made some modifications to the instrument and discovered it to be another close version of the Ravanstron mentioned in Abele and Niederheitmann's The Violin: Its History & Construction..for the first time a four string Kingri has created by Sandaruwan Ranatunga in Sri Lanka & it was used by Dinesh Subasinghe in various musical recordings,

== See also ==
- Bowed string instrument
- Ravanahatha
- Ravana
