= Channa Perera =

Sri Lankan actor and director

channa channa චන්න පෙරේරා
- Born: Deepanath Channa Perera; 16 August 1965 (age 60); Colombo, Sri Lanka
- Education: Sri Sumangala College; Royal College Colombo
- Occupations: Actor, director, producer, screen writer
- Years active: 1992–present
- Spouse: Gayathri Dias
- Children: 2
- Parents: Piyasena Perera (father); Vineetha Piyasena (mother)
- Awards: Best Director; Popular Actor

Deepanath Channa Perera (born 16 August 1965 as චන්න පෙරේරා [Sinhala]) is an actor in Sri Lankan cinema and television as well as a filmmaker and screenplay writer.

== Personal life ==
Channa Perera was born on 16 August 1965 as the eldest of four sons. His father Piyasena Perera was a Director of Education who was in-charge of special education in Sri Lanka. His mother, Vineetha Piyasena, was a teaching instructress. Perera was educated at Sri Sumangala Boys' School, Panadura and then from Royal College Colombo. He completed A/L from bio stream and then took over a Banking job.

He is married to popular actress Gayathri Dias. He met Gayathri during the teledrama Makara Vijithaya. They got married on 26 September 1996. The couple has two daughters - Maleesha Parindya and Duasha Adithya. Elder daughter Maleesha completed education from Musaeus College.Duasha is currently studying at Royal Institute.

== Career ==
His maiden cinematic experience came through 1994 film Sujatha directed by Daya Wimalaweera. Since then, he acted in many dramatic roles particularly in romantic supportive roles. His has acted in many popular serials including Golu Hadawatha, Sathpura Wesiyo, Senehewanthayo, Sath Mahala, Sakwa Lihiniyo and Sooriya Daruwo.

He entered in film direction with the 2006 blockbuster Anjalika. The film won many awards at local film festivals. He introduced Kollywood actress Pooja Umashankar to Sri Lankan film industry with title character in Anjalika. He directed his first television serial, Punchi Weerayo, which became a cult in Sri Lankan television. His next directorial film Sanda Diya Salu, which is an Indian-Sri Lankan joint production was planned to release for nearly 30 theaters of NFC Ridma circuit cinemas, ten Tamil and Telugu copies. But the screening was postponed by many disputes.

=== Some of his television serials ===
- Awasan Horawa
- Bharyawo
- Dahas Gawdura
- Dedunu Yanaya
- Diya Suliya
- Eka Gei Kurullo
- Golu Hadawatha
- Kaneru
- Makara Vijithaya
- Prema Parami
- Sahas Gaw Dura
- Sakwa Lihiniyo
- Sanda Hiru Tharu
- Sathmahala
- Sathpura Wesiyo
- Sawsiri Uyana
- Senehewanthayo
- Sooriya Daruwo
- Sudu Mahaththuru
- Suwanda Padma
- Tharupaba
- Thimira Pauwa
- Vihanga Geethaya

=== Television serials directed ===
- Punchi Weerayo 1 and 2
- Wassanaye Hiru Evidin
- Sanda Diya Arana
- Tikiri Hapannu 1 and 2

== Filmography ==
Key
| † | Denotes films that have not yet been released |

=== As an actor ===
| Year | Film | Role | Ref. |
|---|---|---|---|
| 1994 | Sujatha | Sanath | |
| 1994 | Dhawala Pushpaya | uncredited role | |
| 1995 | Mama Baya Ne Shyama | | |
| 1995 | Chandiyage Putha | Suresh | |
| 1997 | Ninja Sri Lanka | | |
| 1998 | Gini Avi Saha Gini Keli | | |
| 1999 | Thirtha Yathra | Kusal | |
| 2000 | Undaya | Murthi Palihawadana | |
| 2002 | Seethala Gini Kandu | | |
| 2004 | Mille Soya | Chamara | |
| 2006 | Anjalika | Thivanka | |
| 2010 | Hadawatha Mal Yayai | Himal | |
| 2012 | Senasuru Maruwa | Nisal | |
| 2014 | Kalpanthe Sihinayak | Kalpa Wickramasinghe | |
| 2023 | Yugathra | Visal/Sagara | |
| 2024 | Bambara Wasanthe | Sameera | |
| TBA | Inda Nimidam † | South Indian Movie | |
| TBA | Mayavi † | Senehas | |
| TBA | Reyak Ho Peyak † | | |

=== As a film director ===
| Year | Film | Ref. |
|---|---|---|
| 2006 | Anjalika | |
| 2014 | Kalpanthe Sihinayak | |
| 2017 | Ekai Dekai Thunai | |
| 2023 | Yugathra | |
| TBA | Sanda Diya Salu † | |

== Awards and accolades ==
He has won several awards at the local film festivals and television festivals, both for acting and direction.

=== Sarasaviya Awards ===
| Year | Nominee / work | Award | Result |
|---|---|---|---|
| 2006 | Anjalika | Most Popular Actor | Won |

=== Sumathi Awards ===
| Year | Nominee / work | Award | Result |
|---|---|---|---|
| 1998 | Thimira Pauwa | Merit Award | Won |
| 2001 | Punchi Weerayo | Best Creative Director | Won |
| 2001 | Peoples' vote | Most Popular Actor | Won |
| 2002 | Peoples' vote | Most Popular Actor | Won |
| 2003 | Peoples' vote | Most Popular Actor | Won |
| 2004 | Nannadunannee | Best Supporting Actor | Nominated |
| 2016 | Rathu Ahasa | Jury Special Award | Won |

=== Signis OCIC Awards ===
| Year | Nominee / work | Award | Result |
|---|---|---|---|
| 2009 | Anjalika | Best Direction | Won |

=== Derana Music Video Awards ===
| Year | Nominee / work | Award | Result |
|---|---|---|---|
| 2008 | Anjalika | Best Visualized film song | Won |

=== SLIM-Nielsen Peoples Awards ===
| Year | Nominee / work | Award | Result |
|---|---|---|---|
| 2008 | Anjalika | Most Popular Film | Won |

=== Hiru Golden Film Awards ===
| Year | Nominee / work | Award | Result |
|---|---|---|---|
| 2014 | Senasuru Maruwa | Best Actor | Nominated |

=== Derana Film Awards ===
| Year | Nominee / work | Award | Result |
|---|---|---|---|
| 2014 | Senasuru Maruwa | Best Actor | Nominated |
