= Sri Wickrama =

- Sinhala: ශ්‍රී වික්‍රම
- Directed by: Mohan Niyaz
- Written by: Ajith Dharmasooriya
- Based on: Early chronicles
- Produced by: Vendol Media Network
- Starring: Akhila Dhanuddhara; Chulakshi Ranathunga; Sriyantha Mendis; Shyam Fernando; Roshan Pilapitiya
- Cinematography: Sajitha Weerapperuma
- Edited by: Anura Bandara
- Music by: Farhan Shan Dinesh Subasinghe
- Distributed by: Ridma Theatres
- Release date: 1 June 2023
- Running time: 140 minutes
- Country: Sri Lanka
- Language: Sinhala
- Budget: 800 Lakhs

Sri Wickrama (Sinhala: ශ්‍රී වික්‍රම) is a 2023 Sri Lankan Sinhala biographical history film directed by Mohan Niyaz and produced by Dr. Gihan Godakanda for Vendol Media Network. The film is focused on the rise to the throne and the fall of the regime of Sri Wickrama Rajasinha, the last king of Sri Lanka. The film stars Akhila Dhanuddhara as King Sri Wickrama whereas the supporting cast includes Chulakshi Ranathunga, Sriyantha Mendis, Shyam Fernando, Roshan Pilapitiya and Chanchala Warnasooriya.

== Cast and crew ==
- Akhila Dhanuddhara as King Sri Wickrama Rajasinha
- Chulakshi Ranathunga as Queen Consort Sri Venakatha Rangammal Devi
- Sriyantha Mendis as Pilimatalawe Maha Adikaram
- Shyam Fernando as Keppetipola Disawe
- Roshan Pilapitiya as Ehelepola Nilame
- Vathika Ravinath as Madugalle Nilame
- Jagath Epaladeniya as Arawwala Nilame
- Buddhadasa Vithanarachchi
- Palitha Silva
- Chanchala Warnasooriya as Subbamma, Kandasami's mother
- Aruna Rupasinghe
- Sarath Namalgama
- Shalika Edirisinghe as Venakatha Jammal
- Nadaraja Sivam
- Kingsley Lose
- Aruna Rupasingha as Ekneligoda Nilame
- Prasannajith Abeysuriya
- Richard Monde as Robert Brownrigg
- Gajan Ganesan
- Jagath Galappatti
- Tharu Bogoda
- Channa Galappatti
- Anura Dharmasiriwardena
- Sugath Janaka as Palipana
- Bharata Wickramasinghe
- Chris Harris
- Gavin Anthony Ludowyke as Sir John D'Oyly
- Michale Schramn

== Production ==
The film marked the thirteenth cinematic direction of Mohan Niyaz, who previously directed the films Yasōmā (1997), Blendings (1997), Anurāgayē Ananthaya (2000), Sanda Yahanata (2000), Kalu Sudu Mal (2002), Eka Malaka Pethi (2006), and Api Marenne Na (2014). Filming was completed by the end of 2018, but production was delayed due to COVID-19 pandemic. Shooting was completed within 65 days in and around Kandy, Colombo, Dambulla, Anuradhapura as well as within Vendol Lanka premises. Film locations were completely built including a complete model of Dalada Maligawa built in Warakapola.

The film was produced by Dr. Gihan Godakanda, with the screenplay written by Ajith Dharmasuriya. Dhananjaya Manchanayake served as the assistant director and Dhammika Hevaduwatta handled art direction. Cinematography was done by Sajitha Weerapperuma and the film was edited by Anura Bandara. Tilak Priyanka Ratnayake made feature writing whereas color combination was done by Ananda Bandara. Sound mixing was carried out in the Gemini Studios, Chennai where Susantha Dharmapriya handled the sound management. Animation and computer special effects was done by Susantha Pushpakumara and costume was designed by Priyantha Anura Sri with hair styling by Sarath Ranaweera. Samantha Bogahakanda handled the production coordination where Sinhani Costa helped with product design along with product management by Haroldi Karunathileka. Bomb blast shots were controlled by Ranjith Silva whereas Aruna Rupasingha is the stunt coordinator. Farhan Shan made the background music direction and Dinesh Subasinghe composed the song and actress Michelle Dilhara made her debut background vocals in Sri Lankan cinema .

== Release ==
The film was released on 10 November 2023 at Ridma theatres. The Ministry of Education granted special permission and approval for the film to be screened to school children.
