= Theertha Yathra (film) =

Theertha Yathra තීර්ථ යාත්‍රා
- Directed by: Vasantha Obeysekera
- Written by: Vasantha Obeysekera
- Produced by: Chandran Rutnam; Ashoka Perera
- Starring: Joe Abeywickrama; Channa Perera; Yashoda Wimaladharma
- Cinematography: Jayanath Gunawardena
- Edited by: Elmo Haliday
- Music by: Rohana Weerasinghe
- Distributed by: CEL Theatres
- Release date: 1 October 1999
- Country: Sri Lanka
- Language: Sinhala

Theertha Yathra (The Pilgrimage) (Sinhala: තීර්ථ යාත්‍රා) is a 1999 Sri Lankan Sinhala drama thriller film directed by Vasantha Obeysekera and co-produced by Chandran Rutnam and Ashoka Perera. It stars Joe Abeywickrama, Channa Perera and Yashoda Wimaladharma in lead roles along with Chandrasoma Binduhewa and Samson Siripala. Music composed by Rohana Weerasinghe. It is the 922nd Sri Lankan film in the Sinhala cinema.

The film was selected by National Film Corporation (NFC) for screening at the Cairo International Film festival in 1999.

== Cast ==
- Yashoda Wimaladharma as Menaka
- Channa Perera as Kusal
- Joe Abeywickrama as Simon
- Ravindra Randeniya as Suriya Bandara
- Veena Jayakody as Grace
- Saumya Liyanage
- Susila Kottage
- Ravindra Yasas
- Channa Perera
- Ramani Fonseka
- Chandani Seneviratne
- Wilson Gunaratne
- Sasanthi Jayasekara
- Bandula Vithanage
- Chitra Warakagoda
- Gunawardena Hettiarachchi
- Mali Jayaweerage
