= Anjalika =

2006 Sri Lankan film

- Sinhala: අංජලිකා
- Directed by: Channa Perera
- Written by: Mahesh Rathsara
- Produced by: Malith Palliyaguruge
- Starring: Channa Perera; Pooja Umashankar; Anarkali Akarsha
- Cinematography: Jayanth Gunawardhane
- Edited by: Ravindra Guruge
- Music by: Rohana Weerasinghe
- Release date: 28 January 2006
- Country: Sri Lanka
- Language: Sinhala

Anjalika (Sinhala: අංජලිකා) is a 2006 Sinhala romance film. It was written by Mahesh Rathsara and directed by Channa Perera. The film features Channa Perera, Pooja Umashankar and Anarkali Akarsha in the leading roles, while Rex Kodippili, and Sanath Gunathilake play key supporting roles. Produced by Malith Palliyaguruge, the film had music scored by Rohana Weerasinghe. The film marked the debut acting by Kollywood actress Pooja Umashankar in Sinhala cinema. Popular television presenter, Narada Bakmeewewa also made his cinema debut with the film.

It was released in June 2006 to good reviews and good box office, even though the plot was criticized by critics. This was Pooja Umashankar's first Sinhala film.

The film was shot in Malaysia, becoming the first Sri Lankan to be filmed in that country.

== Synopsis ==
A young man named Thivanka returns home to Sri Lanka from England to fall in love with a village girl named Anjalika. This proves to be problematic for Thivanka, as Anjalika is the daughter of a plantation caretaker employed by Thivanka's father. Thivanka's childhood friend, Kavya is in love with Thivanka and wants to marry him. The inevitable clash of rich and poor ends in the kidnapping and subsequent death of Anjalika. Thivanka, reeling from grief, decides to accompany a friend to Malaysia to clear his mind.

While there, he meets a girl named Uttara who is a look alike of Anjalika. He eventually learns that the girl is Anjalika, and her death was faked by his father, Clifford, who mistakenly thought he was Anjalika's biological father, and that he therefore needed to stop the marriage between Thivanka and Anjalika. Later, it is revealed that Anjalika is not Clifford's child. Finally, Thivanka and Anjalika marry while Kavya marries Thivanka's friend Gagana.

== Cast ==
- Channa Perera as Thivanka Imbulgoda
- Pooja Umashankar as Anjalika/Uttara (Voice by Nadeesha Hemamali)
- Anarkali Akarsha as Kavya
- Rex Kodippili as Eardley Samaradivakara, Kavya's father
- Narada Bakmeewewa as Gagana, Thivanka's friend
- Maureen Charuni as Anjalika's mother
- Lakshman Mendis as Piyadasa, Anjalika's father
- Sanath Gunathilake as Clifford Imbulgoda
- Rosy Senanayake as Paba Kumarihamy Imbulgoda
- Robin Fernando as Police Officer
- Oshadhi Hewamadduma as Meena
- G.R Perera

== Release ==
The film opened to good reviews. Chamitha Kuruppu of the Sunday Observer online edition was very complimentary towards Pooja: "All the credit goes to pretty Pooja Umashankar from India who portrays the title character Anjalika. The film will no doubt be a commercial hit, thanks to Pooja's brilliant acting, superb dancing skills and of course her gorgeous looks. Young Pooja's performance as mischievous Anjalika living a carefree life hanging around with children in a village, deserves all the praise. Applause to you Channa for your sweet and worthy 'introduction' to the Sinhala cinema!" The critic also praised the "breathtaking sceneries [sic]and Rohana Weerasinghe's brilliant music. There is no doubt that Sri Lankan film lovers".
