= E Kale the One =

"E Kale (The One)"

Single by Dinesh Subasinghe, Ranushka Fernando, Charmika Sirimanne
- Released: 21 January 2012
- Recorded: January 2011 Digital Line Studios
- Genre: Alternative rock
- Length: 4:40 (album version); 5:11 (soundtrack version)
- Songwriter(s): Dinesh Subasinghe (music), Christina Fernando (lyrics)
- Producer(s): Ranushka Fernando

"E Kale (The One)" (also written as "E Kale: The One") is a single composed by Dinesh Subasinghe featuring Charmika Sirimanne released on January 21, 2012.

== Background and musical style ==
"E Kale (The One)" was the first official music video released by Subasinghe since returning from the KM Music Conservatory in Chennai. It was also his second alternative rock music video. The music combines traditional rock instruments such as the electric guitar, with the classical violin played by Subasinghe. It was sung by Sri Lankan vocalists Charmika Sirimanne and Trishala Wijethunga. The lyrics were made by Christina Fernando.

== Cast and crew ==
The music video's cast includes Sri Lankan artists Vishwa Kodikara, Rajitha Chamikara (Ping Pong), Suresh Gamage, Niroshan Wijesinghe, and Shashe Angeleena alongside Siriwardhana, Wijethunga, and Sirimanne. The video was directed by Ranushka Fernando.
