= Rhyme Skool with Katrina Kaif =

Studio album by A. R. Rahman with KM Music Conservatory, Katrina Kaif
- Released: 12 May 2010
- Recorded: January–April 2010
- Genre: Nursery Rhymes, Pop, Country, Indian Music, Jazz
- Length: 59:00
- Label: Sa Re Ga Ma production India
- Producer: Sa Re Ga Ma production India, Sunfeast Dream Cream, Kidzee

Rhyme Skool is a two-part audio CD album of common nursery rhymes narrated by Bollywood actor Katrina Kaif. The album was produced by KM Music Conservatory and the Saregama Production Company. A. R. Rahman supervised the music, which was composed and orchestrated by his students at the KM Music Conservatory.

== Background ==
"Rhyme Skool" was the first audio CD released by KM Music Conservatory after its launch in 2008. All the scores were recorded, mixed, and mastered at the Audio Media studio in Chennai, where Rahman's main orchestrations were conducted. The album was based on well-known nursery rhymes. The album's official release was held in 2010 at the Intercontinental Hotel in Mumbai. In 2011, the production company launched the second album in the series, Rhyme Skool Vol 2.

Students of the KM Conservatory recorded the album under the guidance of guitarist John Anthony, along with Sivamani and A.R. Rahman.

== Personnel ==
=== Primary musicians ===
- John Anthony – Guitars
- Keith Peters – Bass
- Dinesh Subasinghe – Violin, Ravanahatha, Ektara
- Annad Veer Singh – Harmonica
- Ganeshan S – Percussion
- Vashish Trivedi – Flute
- Jerry Silvester Vincent – Keyboards/Programming

=== Music arrangers ===
- Neehar Dabade
- Jerry Silvester Vincent
- Ganesan S
- Rachinthan Trivedi
- Sanjay Sathyan
- Ankana Arockiam
- Santosh Kumar
- Mannmohan Taneja

=== Vocals ===
- Adithi Deborah
- Mugdha Hasbanis
- Harshitha Krishnan
- Yashwant Gocha
- Dinesh Rahate
- Ashrita Arociam
- Neehar Dabade
- Deepmala
- Ritesh

== Track listing ==
Volume 1
| No. | Title | Length |
|---|---|---|
| 1. | "All By Myself" |
| 2. | "After My Bath" |
| 3. | "Five Little Fingers" |
| 4. | "Where is Thumbkin" |
| 5. | "Head, Shoulders, Knees, and Toes" |
| 6. | "Old McDonald" |
| 7. | "Buzzing Bees" |
| 8. | "Incy Wincy Spider" |
| 9. | "Rain Creatures" |
| 10. | "Bear Went Over the Mountain" |
| 11. | "Teddy Bear" |
| 12. | "Five Little Monkeys" |
| 13. | "It's Raining, It's Pouring" |
| 14. | "April Clouds" |
| 15. | "Water" |
| 16. | "Flowers" |
| 17. | "Seashore" |
| 18. | "Row Row Row Your Boat" |
| 19. | "Choo Choo Train" |
| 20. | "Bus" |
| 21. | "Ringa Ringa Roses" |
| 22. | "Twinkle Twinkle" |
| 23. | "A, B, C, D" |
| 24. | "Grand Old Duke of York" |
| Total length: | | 59:00 |
