= Kalpanthe Sihinayak =

2014 Sri Lankan fantasy thriller film

- Promotional release poster
- Sinhala: කල්පාන්තයේ සිහිනයක්
- Directed by: Channa Perera
- Written by: Kapila Kumara Kalinga, Channa Perera
- Produced by: Pearly Wijesinghe, Sunethra Balasuriya, Harsha Gamaethige, Asela Amarasiri
- Starring: Channa Perera; Chaithra Chandranth; Sanath Gunathilake
- Cinematography: Pushpakumara Rajaguru; Chandana Jayasinghe; Upul Prajath
- Edited by: Ravindra Lal
- Music by: Rohana Weerasinghe; Dinesh Subasinghe
- Distributed by: Ridma, CEL Theatres
- Release date: 31 October 2014
- Running time: 118 minutes
- Country: Sri Lanka
- Language: Sinhala

Kalpanthe Sihinayak (කල්පාන්තයේ සිහිනයක්) is a 2014 Sri Lankan fantasy thriller film directed by Channa Perera and produced by Perly Wijesinghe, Sunethra Balasuriya, Harsha Gamaethige and Asela Amarasiri. It stars Channa Perera and debutant Indian actress Chaithra Chandranth in lead roles along with Sanath Gunathilake, Nihal Fernando and Hemasiri Liyanage. Music co-composed by Rohana Weerasinghe and Dinesh Subasinghe. It is the 1115th Sri Lankan film in the Sinhala cinema.

The film was initially titled Miringu Yaathra. Its plot is based on a King Ravana's missing Ancestry Book which was hidden for more than 5,000 years. The film was shot around Rattota forest areas, Dambulla, and Kaludiya Pokuna Forest.

== Plot ==
It is essentially a love story between an architect and a beautiful village girl. The architect, Kalpa (Channa), travels to a hill country village for work and it is there that meets Menaka (Chaithra). Kalpana faces many challenges with a local group of thugs secretly investigating King Ravan's Ancestry Book. Menaka is a part of Ravan's Ancestry. Her father was murdered by some hidden enemies because of a conflict over a secret document regarding the Ravan Ancestry. Kalpa gets more intrigued about this matter and turns to the monk at the village temple for advice.

The journey to the truth is full of challenges and along the way the duo fall in love.

== Cast ==
- Channa Perera as Kalpa Wickramasinghe
- Chaithra Chandranth as Menaka aka Menu
- Sanath Gunathilake as Mapa
- Iranganie Serasinghe as Menu's elder mother
- Hemasiri Liyanage as Village monk
- Nihal Fernando as CID officer
- Sandun Wijesiri as Jayatunga
- Himali Sayurangi as Padmi
- D.B. Gangodathenna
- Gunadasa Madurasinghe as Salesman
- Saman Almeida as Hilton
- Prasanna Fonseka
- Kapila Sigera
- Teddy Vidyalankara

== Music ==
The music is a collaboration between Dr. Rohana Weerasinghe and Dinesh Subasinghe. Weerasinghe provided the background score and two songs for the film, whilst Subasinghe prepared the love theme music, the title song and the theatrical trailer music. The vocals were provided by Uresha Raviharee, Sumudu Nimantha Munasinghe, Udaya Wickramasinghe and Ranjan Saliya.

== Soundtrack ==
| No. | Title | Singer(s) | Length |
|---|---|---|---|
| 1. | "Kalpanthaye Roopa Maya" | Sumudu Nimanka |
| 2. | "Nil Nethu Nilupul" | Ranjan Saliya, Uresha Ravihari |
| 3. | "Dura Atha Sulangeda" | Udaya Sri Wickramasinghe, Uresha Ravihari |
