= Hadawatha Mal Yayai =

- Sinhala: හදවත මල් යායයි
- Directed by: Ananda Wickramasinghe
- Written by: Ananda Wickramasinghe
- Produced by: Nuwandara Films
- Starring: Channa Perera; Chathurika Peiris
- Cinematography: M. H. Gafoor
- Edited by: M. S. Aliman
- Music by: Ranga Dassanayake
- Release date: 4 March 2010
- Running time: 177 minutes
- Country: Sri Lanka
- Language: Sinhala

Hadawatha Mal Yayai (Sinhala: හදවත මල් යායයි) is a 2010 Sri Lankan Sinhala romantic film directed by Ananda Wickramasinghe and produced by Thilak Kodikara for Nuwandara Films. It stars Channa Perera and Chathurika Peiris in lead roles along with Tennyson Cooray and Sanath Gunathilake. It is the 1135th Sri Lankan film in the Sinhala cinema.

== Cast ==
- Channa Perera as Himal
- Chathurika Peiris as Lihini
- Tennyson Cooray
- Rajiv Nanayakkara
- Rathna Sumanapala
- Sanath Gunathilake
- Mahinda Pathirage
- Anushi Warnasuriya
- Srimath Indrajith Liyanage

== Soundtrack ==
| No. | Title | Lyrics | Singer(s) | Length |
|---|---|---|---|---|
| 1. | "Seethala Gee Sara" | Saman Chandranath Weerasinghe | Nalinda Ranasinghe, Gayani Madhusha |
| 2. | "Prema Kurulla" | Saman Chandranath Weerasinghe | Sanka Dineth, Manjula Nivanthi |
