= Siri Sirimal =

- Directed by: Sunil Costha
- Starring: Isham Samsudeen
- Theme music composer: Dinesh Subasinghe
- Country of origin: Sri Lanka
- Original language: Sinhala

Production
- Cinematography: Prabath Roshan
- Editor: Kumara Glamuruwa
- Running time: 19 minutes per episode (39 episodes)
- Production company: Shiran telesceane

Original release
- Network: Rupavahini

Siri Sirimal is a Sri Lankan television series directed by Sunil Costha that aired on Rupavahini from 2007 to 2008. It was adapted from Mark Twain's 1876 novel The Adventures of Tom Sawyer. The theme song and sound track for the series were composed by Dinesh Subasinghe (for which he won the Golden award for best music director at the 2009 SIGNIS Awards).

== Plot ==
Sirimal (Ishan Shamsudeen) is a mischievous young boy who often skips school. One day, he plans to join Rosa but changes his mind when he catches sight of the young Daughter of Richman (Lusion Bulathsinghala). He decides to sneak back into class instead. Surprisingly, Sirimal's teacher (Edward Gunawardhana) makes him sit with the girls, a situation that Sirimal secretly enjoys as he gets to sit next to them. Among the girls, he also finds himself sitting beside Amy Lawrence, a friend with whom he is "engaged." Although Amy still has romantic feelings for him, Sirimal is too captivated by the Richman girls to notice her.

He was a poor boy who lives with his aunt. He steals food and gets caught by his aunt (Geetha Kanthy Jayakody) who beats and punishes him. He runs away to the small jungle near the river where he meets a boy who is elder to him. Almost instinctually (but probably a social facet of village boys), they fight and Sirimal tries to become prince over them.

Later in the Story Sirimal teams up with two other mischievous boys Rosa and Dasa, vowing never to be separated from each other. One night they come across three villagers, Gunaya (Cletus Mendis), Bempi(Kumara Thirimadhura) and Kattandiya at a cemetery and while sharing some stolen money they fight and Kattandiya is killed by Gunaya. Gunaya escapes by framing innocent Bempi. When the murder trial starts and Bempi is on the verge of being convicted, Sirimal & Rosa testify and the verdict changes.

Later, the same kids try to find a treasure at a haunted house. When they reach there they see that it belongs to thieves and they are running away with the hidden treasure. They follow but fail to catch the thieves . When Sirimal and Rosa try to catch the thieves they stumble into a dangerous arena and thwart it.

== Cast and crew ==
Cast

- Isham Shamsudeen
- Geetha Kanthi Jayakody
- Edward Gunawardena
- Maureen Charuni
- Kumara Thirimadura
- Lucien Bulathsinhala
- Sarath Kothalawala
- Tony Ranasinghe
- Cletus Mendis
- Gamini Jayalath
- Daya Alwis
- Asela Jayakody
- Chandra Kaluarachchi
- Saman Almeda
- G. R. Perera
- Chathura Rajasuriya
- Chamara Ranga
- Isuri Navodya
- Tharaka Nadishani
- Tharuka Madushan

Crew

- Director-Sunil Costha
- Cinema Autography-Prabath Roshan
- Editor-Kumara Galgamuwa
- Music score-Dinesh Subasinghe
- Vocals-Madawa Senivirathna & DRC Members Choir
- Art directors-Sunil Wijeratne & Sena Mabulage
- Make up-Priyantha Dissanayake
- Production executive- Nimal Wijesiri Senadeera
- Assistant Director- Newton Gunasekara

== Music ==
The score, which uses string and brass orchestra, was composed by Dinesh Subasinghe. The theme song "Mandho Kawdho" was very popular among children in Sri Lanka in 2007–2009.. It was sung by Madhawa Senivirathan and the Dee R Cee members vocal group. To conjure up the time period of the plot (the 1940s), Subasinghe used a digital effect which recreated the sound of an old gramophone record in some parts of the score.

== Reception ==
The review aggregator website IMDb reported an approval rating of 9 out of 10, based on 43 reviews. Most viewers might very positive. The drama was highly praised for its inspiring storyline and positive message. It resonated with audiences of all ages, particularly students and parents, due to its emphasis on education, resilience, and moral values. The series also contributed to a renewed interest in Kumaratunga Munidasa’s literary works, further cementing its cultural significance.
