= Yugathra =

2023 Sri Lankan psychological fantasy romantic drama film

- Sinhala: යුගාත්‍රා
- Directed by: Channa Perera
- Produced by: Jayantha Dharmadasa; Wasantha Perera; Isuru Wijesinghe; Sriyani Senanayake; Janaka Edirisuriya
- Starring: Channa Perera; Mashi Siriwardena
- Music by: Dinesh Subasinghe
- Production company: Wishmitha Films
- Release date: 20 April 2023
- Country: Sri Lanka
- Language: Sinhala

Yugathra (Sinhala: යුගාත්‍රා) is a 2023 Sri Lankan Sinhala-language romantic fantasy psychological drama film written and directed by Channa Perera. The film stars Channa Perera, Mashi Siriwardena in the lead roles. The film was showcased for a premiere at the Scope-Sarasaviya Film Festival in September 2020 by Scope Cinemas especially during the peak of the COVID-19 pandemic. The soundtrack of the film as well as the official trailer of the film were launched in a special event which was held at Colombo City Centre on 14 February 2023 coinciding with the Valentine's Day.The soundtrack and the songs has been composed by Dinesh Subasinghe. The film had its theatrical release on 20 April 2023.

== Plot ==
The film revolves around Visal, a young man who wants to find out regarding the secret behind a mysterious girl who continues to gain him in his dreams during night when sleeping.

== Cast ==
- Channa Perera as Visal/Sagara
- Mashi Siriwardena
- Iresha Asanki De Silva
- Sanath Gunathilake
- Nadeeka Gunasekara
- Lakshman Mendis

== See also ==
- List of Sri Lankan films of the 2020s
