= Dr. Nawariyan =

- Directed by: Ranjan Ramanayake
- Written by: Lal Priyadeva
- Produced by: Ranjan Ramanayake Films; Flash Entertainment
- Starring: Ranjan Ramanayake; Ruwangi Rathnayake; Rex Kodippili
- Cinematography: Gamini Moragollagama; Janith Gunasekara; Indika Aththanayake
- Edited by: Thilanka Perera
- Music by: Dinesh Subasinghe
- Distributed by: MPI, LFD Theatres
- Release date: 8 December 2017
- Country: Sri Lanka
- Language: Sinhala

Dr. Nawariyan is a 2017 Sri Lankan Sinhala-language action comedy film directed by Ranjan Ramanayake and produced by Ranjan himself with Flash Entertainment. It stars Ranjan Ramanayake and Ruwangi Rathnayake in lead roles along with Rex Kodippili, Sriyani Amarasena and Sarath Chandrasiri. The film was influenced by 2003 Bollywood film Munna Bhai M.B.B.S. It is the 1292nd Sri Lankan film in the Sinhala cinema.

The first showing took place on 28 November 2017 at Tharangani Cinema Hall. Music Score has done by Dinesh Subasinghe. The film passed 75 days of screening successfully.

== Plot ==
Nirwan Senanayake, nicknamed as Nawariyan, is a thug: a crime don in Colombo. Given that his father had wished him to be a medical doctor, he creates the faux Senanayake Hospital and pretends to live in accordance with this wish whenever his father and mother visit him in Colombo.

One year, however, Nirwan's plan goes awry when his father meets an old friend, Dr. Dean Wickramasinghe and the two older men decide to complete their friendship by a relationship, where Nirwan to Wickramasinghe's daughter, Dr. Bhagya who known as Pinki by Nirwan. At this point the truth about Nirwan is revealed by the servant of Wickramasinghe's house. Wickramasinghe insults Nirwan's parents and calls them "fools" for being ignorant of Nirwan's real life as gang leader Nawariyan. Nirwan's father and mother, aghast and later heartbroken, leave for their village. Nirwan, in grief and despair, decides that the only way to redeem himself and gain revenge for the humiliation suffered by his father at the hands of the spiteful Wickramasinghe is to become a doctor. He decides to go to a medical college to obtain an MBBS degree.

With the help of his right-hand man Circuit and others, Nirwan "gains admission" to a medical college, where he again encounters Dr. Wickramasinghe, who is the dean of private hospital. His success there becomes dependent upon the (coerced) help of faculty member Dr. Roshan.

While Nawariyan's skills as a medical doctor are minimal, he transforms those around him with the "Magic Kiss" ("magical hug") which is a method of comfort taught to Nirwan by his mother and the compassion he shows towards those in need. Despite the school's emphasis on mechanical, Cartesian, impersonal, often bureaucratic relationships between doctors and patients, Nirwan constantly seeks to impose a more empathetic, almost holistic, regimen. To this end, he defies all convention by treating a brain-dead man called "Ananda Ayya" as if the man were able to perceive and understand normally; interacts on familiar but autocratic terms with patients; humiliates school bullies; effusively thanks a hitherto-underappreciated janitor; and encourages the patients themselves to make changes in their lives, so that they do not need drugs or surgery.

Dr. Wickramasinghe, who perceives all this as symptoms of chaos, is unable to prevent it from expanding and gaining ground at his college. He becomes increasingly irrational and anger, almost to the point of insanity. Repeatedly, this near-dementia is shown when he receives unwelcome tidings and he begins laughing in a way that implies that he has gone mad. Wickramasinghe's laughing serves more to convey his anger than diffuse it. Meanwhile, his daughter becomes increasingly fond of Nirwan, who in his turn becomes unreservedly infatuated with her. Some comedy appears here, because Nirwan is unaware that Dr. Bhagya and his childhood friend "Pinki" are one and the same; an ignorance that Bhagya hilariously exploits. Wickramasinghe tries several times to expel Nirwan but is often thwarted by Nirwan's wit or the affection with which the others at the college regard Nirwan, having gained superior self-esteem by his methods. Wickramasinghe keeps a challenge that Nirwan can stay in college only if he passes the exam under his supervision. Nirwan and other mates accept it. Meanwhile, cancer patient Anushka is in a dying state seeking help from Nirwan. But unfortunately he dies in Nirwan's arms.

Eventually, Nirwan is shamed into leaving the college: His guilt for not being able to help Anushka gets the better of him. In the moments immediately following Nirwan's departure, Ananda miraculously awakens from his vegetative state; at this point Bhagya gives a heartfelt speech wherein she criticizes her father for having banished Nirwan, saying that to do so is to banish hope, compassion, love, and happiness from the college. Wickramasinghe eventually realizes his folly. Drunked Nirwan comes to home at late night and sees his parents at home. He shocks when his parents hugged him. Nirwan's father tells him that Pinki is waiting for him in home. Nirwan unwillingly goes to home and informs that he only loved Dr. Bhagya. Bhagya turns back to Nirwan and reveals her true identity as Pinki.

== Cast ==
- Ranjan Ramanayake as Nirwan Senanayake aka Nawariyan
  - Chandev Ipalawatte as child Nawariyan
- Ruwangi Rathnayake as Dr. Bhagya Wickramasinghe aka Pinki
- Sarath Chandrasiri as Circuit Sarath
- Srimal Wedisinghe as Dr. Dean Wickramasinghe
- Sarath Kothalawala as Doctor Roshan Galagedara
- Rex Kodippili as Prabath Senanayake, Nirwan's father
- Sriyani Amarasena as Charitha Senanayake, Nirwan's mother
- Wimal Kumara de Costa as Sumanasiri
- Sandun Wijesiri as Roshan's father
- Bindu Bothalegama as Bindu
- Rajasinghe Loluwagoda as Ananda Perera
- Ronnie Leitch as Dhanapala
- Akila Sandakelum as Anushka
- Nipuni Wilson as Nipuni a.k.a. Fake Pinki
- Manel Chandralatha as Mother of Poison drunk boy
- Nilmini Kottegoda as Wimala, Wickramasinghe's house servant
- Nandana Hettiarachchi as Pick-pocket thief
- Chathura Perera as Nawariyan's gang member
- Ariyasena Gamage as Hospital servant
- Premadasa Vithanage as Hospital servant
- Keerthi Rathnayake as Premalal
- Saman Dilshan as Andy
- Lasanda Wickramasinghe as Matron

== Songs ==
The film contains only two songs., Composed by Dinesh Subasinghe

No.	Title	Lyrics	Singer(s)	Length
1.	"Appachchita Nokara Katha"	Chandradasa Fernando	Ranjan Ramanayake, Lanthra Perera
2.	"Mada Pawanellak Se"	Sajith V. Chathuranga	Uresha Ravihari, Hector Dias
