= WarigaPojja =

WarigaPojja (The Clan)
- Directed by: Thushara Thennakoon
- Written by: Nandasiri Gamage
- Produced by: Sri Lanka Women's Development Services Cooperative Society Ltd
- Starring: Nadeesha Nilukshi; Nayana Hettiarachchi; Jagath Manuwarna
- Cinematography: Vishvajith Karunarathna
- Edited by: Pravin Jayarathna, Jayantha Ahangama
- Music by: Dinesh Subasinghe
- Production companies: Dil Films, TVT Colombo
- Release date: 20 March 2014
- Running time: 116 minutes
- Country: Sri Lanka
- Language: Sinhala
- Budget: 180 LKR Lkhs

WarigaPojja is a 2014 Sri Lankan adventure film, directed by Thushara Thennakoon and produced by the Sri Lanka Women's Development Services Cooperative Society Ltd. It stars Nadeesha Nilukshi and Jagath Manuwarna in lead roles along with Somaweera Gamage and Nayana Hettiarachchi. Music composed by Dinesh Subasinghe.

The screenplay was based on a short story, Warigaya, written by Nandasiri Gamage. The film is set in the Hanthana forest area around Kandy. Wariga Pojja depicts the journey of a Morana Wariga tribesman who must escape and rescue his tribe after the destruction of the village from malaria.

Nandasir Gamage named all the financial contributors as producers of this film, numbering 80,000. Each contributed 100 lkr., This was the 1204 th movie of Sri Lankan Cinema

== Plot ==
Around 1890 the indigenous Sri Lankan tribesmen (Veddas) struggled with malaria. The film starts with a mother's death from the disease and the rest of the family leaving the cave where they live with their mother's body.

The father, Kauwa, son, Billa, and daughter, Handuni, continue the trip while the father sees their mother's soul (haetaā), which follows them wherever they go. They arrive at a cave near a stream, where they make arrangements to camp. They hear the loud sounds made by Nittaewa, an uncivilized human-ape.

In the night the father asks the children to leave him and meet their relatives at the other side of the jungle. Billa refuses that request asking his father to rest and gain strength to join with them. Finally Billa obeys his father, promising his father that he will save his sister and find her a match from the tribe.

== Cast ==
- Nadeesha Fonseka as Handuni
- Nayana Hettiarachchi as Mother
- Jagath Manuwarana as Billa
- Poopalasingham Pradeepan as Nittawa
- Somaweera Gamage as Kauwa

== Music score ==
The musical score was written by Dinesh Subasinghe, using acoustic instruments such as Armenian duduk, Bolivian flutes, takara, Chinese guita 'pipa' as well as folk bamboo flutes, jembe drums, Sri Lankan folk drums, Japanese taiko and different woodwinds. Annada Perera and Uresha Ravihare lent/ vocals along with Dinesh Subasinghe's folk singing.

Score was nominated for best music in 3rd Derana Lux film Awards 2015 and won the award for Most popular film song of the year in the same award ceremony. Lyrics were written by Nandasiri Gamage.
