= Ho Gaana Pokuna =

Ho Gana Pokuna හෝ ගානා පොකුණ
- official poster
- Directed by: Indika Ferdinando
- Screenplay by: Indika Ferdinando
- Produced by: Kusumsiri Liyanaarachchi; Yashodara Sarachchandra; Dayananda Liyanarachi; Shyama Athukorala; Bimal Fernando; Nirosha Fernando; Geetha Muthumala; Sunil T. Fernando
- Starring: Jayalath Manoratne; Lucien Bulathsinhala; Thishakya Kumarathunga; Anjalee Wickramasinghe; Anasuya Subasinghe; Jagath Chamila
- Cinematography: Channa Deshapriya
- Music by: Dinesh Subasinghe
- Production companies: Next Frame Studio & Production
- Distributed by: Sunil T Films
- Release date: 11 December 2015
- Running time: 119 minutes
- Country: Sri Lanka
- Language: Sinhala

Ho Gana Pokuna (The Singing Pond) (Sinhala: හෝ ගානා පොකුණ) is a 2015 Sri Lankan children's musical drama film written and directed by Indika Ferdinando. It depicts a teacher in a remote village, Uma (Anasuya Subasinghe), teaching her students to focus on something they have never seen before.

The film was awarded the Teacher's Choice Prize at the 31st Chicago International Children's Film Festival, Best Feature Film at the 38th Lucas International Children's Festival, and the City of Zlin Award at the 55th Zlín Film Festival. It had its world premiere at the Shanghai International Film Festival and was designated as the official selection at the Hanoi International Film Festival.

== Plot ==
A new teacher, Uma (Anasuya Subasinghe), arrives at a school with her first appointment in a remote village near Dambulla in Sri Lanka. The school has few students, with only the principal (Lucian Bulathsinghala) and Uma as the teacher. With the help of Uma the pupils gradually start to dream of bigger things than they ever imagined.

One day Upuli, a blind girl, shares her unseen dream with school friends Sukiri and Ukkun. It gradually becomes the dream throughout the village. The children and Uma encounter perils in their venture to realise this dream. The children of the school start to focus on something they have never seen before. This target gives rise to a small revolution.

== Film crew ==
The movie was directed by Indika Ferdinando. It was produced by Kusumsiri Liyanaarachchi, Yashodhara Sarachchandra, Dayananda Liyanaarachchi, Shyama Athukorala, Bimal Fernando, Nirosha Fernando, and Geetha Muthumala. Principal photography was undertaken by Channa Deshapriya and editing by Thissa Surendra.

== Cast ==
- Anusuya Subasinghe as Uma
- Lucien Bulathsinhala as School principal
- Jayalath Manoratne as Bus driver Justin
- Dayadewa Edirisinghe as Gramasevaka
- Jayani Senanayake as Chithra, Gramasevaka's wife
- Hyacinth Wijeratne as Principal's wife
- Senat Dikkumbura as Mudalali
- Geetha Kanthi Jayakody as Justin's wife
- Ama Wijesekera as Tailor woman
- Jagath Chamila as Madhuwantha, Uma's lover (only voice)
- D.B. Gangodathenna as Kiri Aththa
- Chathuranga Wijethunga
- Senaka Titus as Sudu Banda
- Ananda Kumara Unnehe as Farmer
- Wasantha Muhandiram as Pushpakumara

=== Child actors ===
- Thishakya Kumaratunga
- Anjali Methsara as Blind girl
- Sathsara Jayasuriya
- Nethpriya Manubhashitha
- Senith Valpotagamage
- Sethika Gunasinghe
- Nihansa Dissanayake
- Vinod Saleem
- Udara Perera
- Wasana Pathirana
- Kimuthu Liyanaarchchi
- Maleesha Muthuarachchi
- Nileesha Dinethmi
- Vishmi Sathsarani
- Deshan Abeweera
- Navoda Hansini
- Vinumi Vinsadi
- Nesta Maneth

== Musical score ==
The film's score and songs were composed and conducted by Dinesh Subasinghe. Vocals for the theme song, "Rata Pena Kiri Haawa", were provided by Thrishala Wijethunga with background vocals by Dewmini Fernando, Dinith Ridhmika, Banuka Senivirathna and Nishami Naizara.

=== Sound track ===
The sound track of the movie was released on M Entertainment music. The musical score has been admired by the Hanoi film jury and Chicago media journalists. The soundtrack was recorded by Rajeewa Jayawickrama and finalised by Shashika Ruwan Maarasinghe in Chennai.

No.	Title	Singer(s)	Length
1.	"Atha Pena Deta Wada"	Dewmini Fernando, Thrishala Wijesinghe, Banuka Senevirathna, Dinith Ridmika, Nishami Nishara	03:07
2.	"Ho Gana Pokune"	Dewmini Fernando, Thrishala Wijesinghe, Banuka Senevirathna, Dinith Ridmika, Nishami Nishara	04:23
3.	"Hitha Purama Dagana Natana"	Dewmini Fernando, Thrishala Wijesinghe, Banuka Senevirathna, Dinith Ridmika, Nishami Nishara	03:52
Total length:			11:22

== Awards and nominations ==
=== International Awards ===
Year	Film Festival	Country	Category	Result
2015	31st Chicago International Children's Film Festival	U.S.	Special Jury award (Teacher's Choice)	Won
2015	55th Zlín Film Festival	Czech Republic	City of Zlin Award,	Won
2015	38th Lucas International Children's Film Festival	Germany	Best Feature film award	Won
2016	SAARC Film Festival	SAARC countries	*Best Screenplay-Indika Ferdinando *Best Editor-Tissa Surendra	Won

=== Awards in Sri Lankan Film Festivals ===
==== 4th Derana Sunsilk Film Awards 2016 ====
Ho Gana Pokuna movie has got nine nominations & won six awards at the 4th Derana Sunsilk Film Awards 2016 at Nelum pokuna Thearter on 14 May 2016.

Category	Artist	Result
Best Original Score	Dinesh Subasinghe	Won
Best Supporting Actor	Jayalath Manoratne	Won
Most Popular Film Song	Dinesh Subasinghe	Won
Best Direction	Indika Ferdinando	Nominated
Best Screen Play	Indika Ferdinando	Nominated
Best Art Director	Manjula Ayagama	Nominated
Best Actor in a Negative Role	Dayadeva Edirisinghe	Nominated
Best Actress in a Supporting Role	Jayani Senanayake	Nominated
Best Movie & Most Popular Movie	Kusumsiri Liyanaarachchi,Yashodhara Sarachchandra, Dayananda Liyanaarachchi, Shyama Athukorala, Bimal Fernando, Nirosha Fernando, Sunil T Fernando,	Won

Jury Awards

- Special award for Anasuya Subasinghe.
- Highest Grossing Movie

==== 2nd Hiru Golden Film Awards 2016 ====
Category	Artist	Result
Most Popular Film Song	Kusumsiri Liyanaarachchi, Indika Ferdinando, Dinesh Subasinghe	Won
Best Editing	Tissa Surendra	Won
Best Sound Designing	Sasika Ruwan Marasinghe	Nominated
Best Comic Role	Jayalath Manoratne	Won
Best Original Score	Dinesh Subasinghe	Nominated
Best Movie Song	Dinesh Subasinghe	Nominated
Most Popular Child Star	Thishakya Kumarathunga	Won
Most Promising director	Indika Ferdinando	Nominated
Best Negative Role	Daya Deva Edhirisinghe	Won
Best Screen Play	Indika Ferdinando	Nominated
Best Movie	Kusumsiri Liyanaarachchi,Yashodara Sarachchandra, Dayananda Liyanaarachchi, Shyama Athukorala, Bimal Fernando, Nirosha Fernando, Sunil T Fernando	Won

Jury Awards

- Special Award for Anjali Wickramasinghe

==== 36th SIGNIS Awards (OCIC) 2016 ====
Category	Artist	Result
Best Editing	Tissa Surendra	Won
Best Sound Designing	Sasika Ruwan Marasinghe	Won
Best Original Score	Dinesh Subasinghe	Won
Best Supporting Role	Jayalath Manoratne	Won
Best Supporting Role	Dayadeva Edirisinghe	Nominated
Best Actress	Anasuya Subasinghe	Nominated
Best Director	Indika Ferdinando	Won
Best Screen Play	Indika Ferdinando	Won
Best Movie	Kusumsiri Liyanaarachchi,Yashodhara Sarachchandra, Dayananda Liyanaarachchi, Shyama Athukorala, Bimal Fernando, Nirosha Fernando, Sunil T Fernando	Won

Jury Awards

- Special Award for Anjali Wickramasinghe

==== 33rd Sarasaviya Awards ====
Category	Artist	Result
Most Promising Actress	Anasuya Subasinghe	Won
Best Supporting Actor	Jayalath Manoratne	Won
Best Original Score	Dinesh Subasinghe	Nominated
Best lyricist	indika Ferdinando,Kusumsiri Liyanaarachchi	Nominated
Best Cinematography	Channa Deshapriya	Nominated
Best Sound Designing	Sasika Ruwan Marasinghe	Nominated
Best Director	Indika Ferdinando	Nominated
Best Screen Play	Indika Ferdinando	Nominated
Best Movie	Kusumsiri Liyanaarachchi,Yashodara Sarachchandra, Dayananda Liyanaarachchi, Shyama Athukorala, Bimal Fernando, Nirosha Fernando, Geetha Muthumala, Sunil T Fernando	Nominated

- Jury Merit Awards
- Dinesh Subasinghe
- Thisakya Kumaratunge

==== Presidential Film Awards 2017 ====
Category	Artist	Result
Best Art director	Manjula Ayagama	Won
Best Film Song	Dinesh Subasinghe	Won
Best Original Score	Dinesh Subasinghe	Nominated
Best Supporting Actor	Jayalath Manoratne	Won
best Upcoming Actress	Anasuya Subasinghe	Won

- Jury Merit Awards
- Thishakya Sankalana Kumarathunga
- Senith Sathwiru Walpitagamage
- Sathsara Sawan Jayasooriya
- Senitha Dinith Gunasinhe
- Nethpriya Madhubhashitha Ranawakarachchige

== Box office ==
The film completed 100 days and went up to 147 days until the release date of movie Paththini. It was a huge box office success in Sri Lanka and won the Highest Grossing movie Award at the 4th Derana Sunsilk Film Festival. The film was recorded as the first Sri Lankan movie to be released in Blu-Ray technology.
