= Ravanahatha =

Ancient Indian bowed string instrument

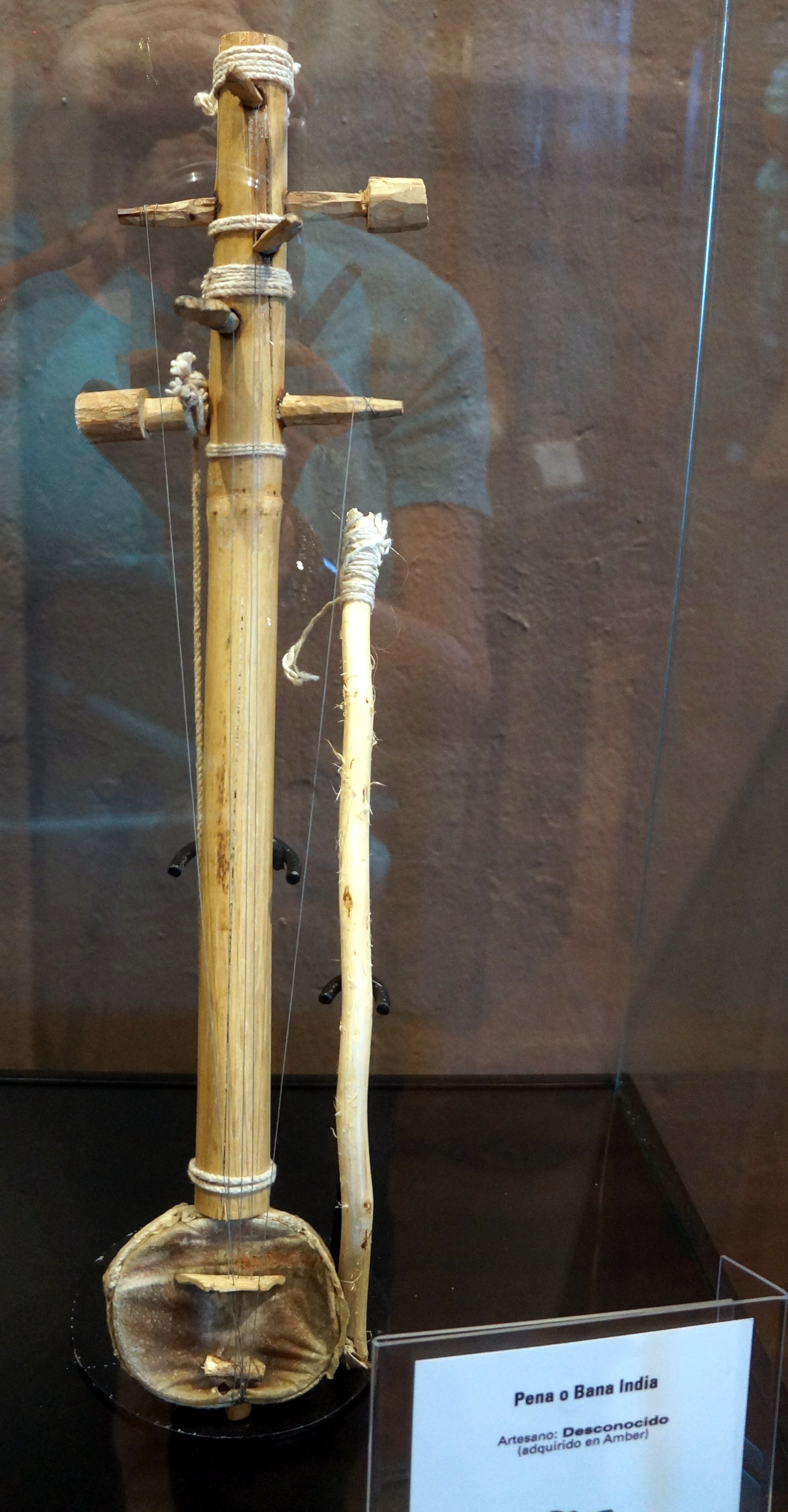
Indian Ravanhatha at the Casa Museo Del Timple, Lanzarote, Spain.

A ravanahatha (variant names: ravanhatta, rawanhattha, ravanastron, ravana hasta veena) is an ancient bowed, stringed instrument, used in India, Sri Lanka, and surrounding areas. It has been suggested as an ancestor of the violin.

== Construction ==
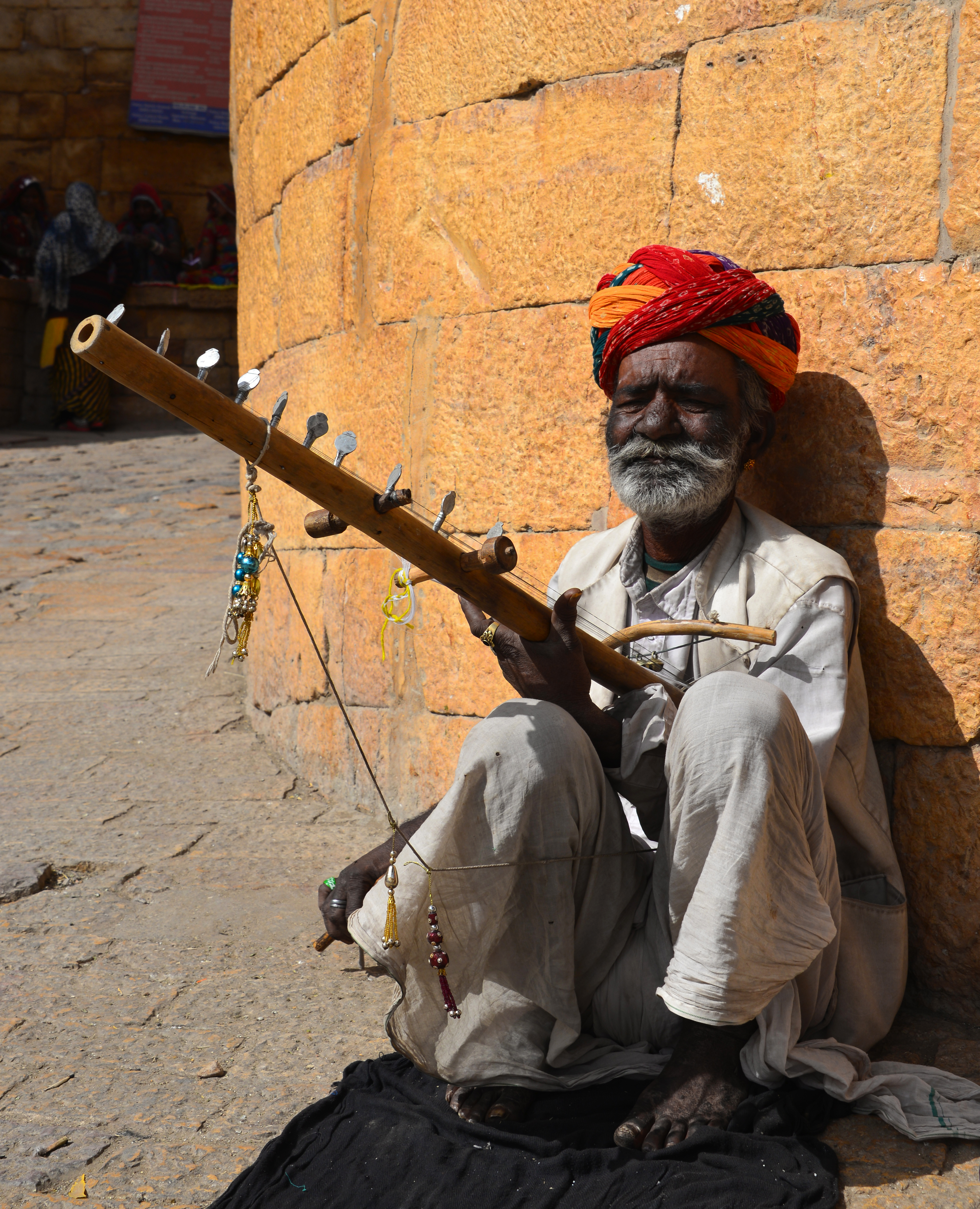
Man playing Ravanahatha in Jaisalmer, India

The ravanahatha's sound box may be a gourd, a halved coconut shell or hollowed-out cylinder of wood, with a membrane of stretched goat or other hide. A neck of wood or bamboo is attached, carrying between one and four or more peg-tuned strings of gut, hair or steel, strung over a bridge. Some examples may have several sympathetic strings. The bow is usually of horsehair; examples vary in length.

== History ==
In Indian tradition, the ravanahatha is believed to have originated among the Hela people of Lanka during the time of the legendary king Ravana, after whom the instrument is supposedly named. The Hela people, however, had only settled in Sri Lanka around 500 BCE, and had not found any trace of an earlier civilization, only groups of tribals whom they called 'yakshas'. According to legend, Ravana used the ravanahatha in his devotions to the Hindu God Shiva. In the Hindu Ramayana epic, after the war between Rama and Ravana, Hanuman returned to North India with a ravanahatha. The ravanahatha is particularly popular among street musicians in Rajasthan, North India.

Throughout the history of Medieval India, the kings were patrons of music; this helped in increased popularity of the ravanhatha among royal families. In Rajasthan and Gujarat, it was the first musical instrument to be learned by princes. The Sangit tradition of Rajasthan further helped in popularizing ravanhatta among women.

Some sources suggest that between the seventh and tenth centuries AD, Arab traders brought the ravanastron from India to the Near East, where it provided the basic model for the Arab rebab, and other early ancestors of the violin family.

== Modern use ==
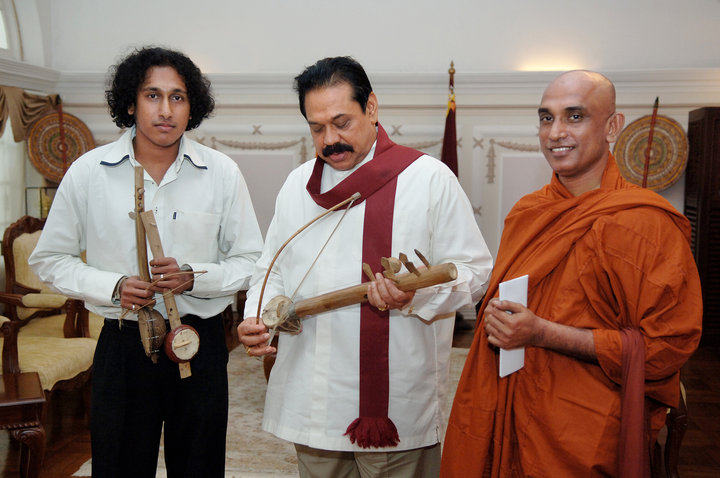
Dinesh Subasinghe showing his new version of the ravanahatha to Mahinda Rajapaksa

In modern times, the instrument has been revived by Sri Lankan composer and violinist Dinesh Subasinghe and used in several of his compositions, including Rawan Nada and the Buddhist oratorio Karuna Nadee.

The European experimental folk band Heilung also make use of the ravanahatha, in two of their albums Ofnir and Futha.

The Ravanahatha is mentioned briefly in Chapter 2 of Samuel Beckett's 1953 novel Watt: “A ravanastron hung, on the wall, from a nail, like a plover.”
