= Sihina Wasanthayak =

- Written by: Sunil Siriwardhana
- Directed by: Sunil Costha, Saranga Mendis based on Autograph (2004 film)
- Starring: Niroshan Wijesinghe, Kanjana Mendis, Pamudhi Karunarathna, Cleetus Mendis, Sachini Ayendra Stanley, Warsha Perera, Isham Samzudeen, Kumara Thirimadhura, Devnaka Porage
- Theme music composer: Dinesh Subasinghe
- Country of origin: Sri Lanka
- Original languages: Sinhala; Tamil

Production
- Producer: Harold Wijesinghe
- Cinematography: Pradeep Bulathsinghala
- Editor: Broadcasting Solutions by Dhanushka Chathurangga for first 30th episodes/ Rest Gayantha Sampath
- Running time: 20 minutes per episode (62 episodes)

Original release
- Network: Sirasa TV

Sihina Wasanthayak (Spring of Dreams) was a popular Sri Lankan television series directed by Sunil Costha and Saranga Mendis. A romantic drama, it was an adaption from the 2004 Tamil language film Autograph and was telecast on Sirasa TV in 2008-2009. The songs and soundtrack for the series were composed by Dinesh Subasinghe.

== Production ==
The series was produced by Harold Wijesinghe, Broadcast Solutions, and Sirasa TV in 2007. It consisted of 62 episodes in all, each 20 minutes long. The filming began in June 2007 at Dambulla and Sigiriya and later shifted to Colombo.

== Plot ==
This serial begins with the character Nirmal (played by Niroshan Wijesinghe) setting off on a journey, distributing wedding invitations for his forthcoming wedding. Along the way, he encounters various individuals from his past, who bring back memories of three women that have affected his love life.

The journey to his childhood days begins there. The happenings in the school, his tussle with his friends and his first love with his classmate, Sunimali (played by Pamudi Karunaratne (In childhood) and Kanchana Mendis) are all pictured realistically. Nirmal reaches the village and invites all, including Sunimale, who promises to come to the wedding with her husband and three children. Then, he goes to North where he had his college education. His major crush at that time was a girl of mixed Tamil and Malayalee parentage (played by Warsha Perera), with whom he fell in love. The affair proved to be short-lived as her parents married her off to her cousin. On reaching Kerala to invite her, Nirmal is shattered to see his lover as a widow.

Then he comes across a trusted friend Pooja (played by Sachini Ayendra Stanley), who instils confidence and teaches him the lesson that one has to go ahead in life without looking back. However, she does not reveal the tragedy that occurred in her past. But as time passes by, she reveals that her mother is paralyzed and that she now has to work for her own survival.

== Cast ==
- Niroshan Wijesinghe as Nirmal
  - Isham Samzudeen as Young Nirmal
- Kanchana Mendis as Suvimali
  - Pramudi Karunarathna as Young Suvimali
- Cletus Mendis
- Kumara Thirimadura
- Sachini Ayendra Stanley as Pooja
- Nimal Pallewatha
- Warsha Perera as Tamil girl
- Devnaka Porage
- Thusitha Laknath

== Music ==
The show's theme song, "Sansara purudada mey", was performed by Amal Perera, Prabodha Kariyakarawana and Dinesh Subasinghe. The children's voices were sung by Thayalan and Madawa Senivrathana. Cover versions of the song have been performed on the Derana TV program Dream Stars by Chinthaka Malith and Dinesh Tharanga, and on the Sirasa TV program Superstar by Meena Prasadhini and Wirajika Murashini. The sound track and songs were recorded and mixed at G 1 Studio, Dee R Cee Studio and Penguin Studio in Colombo and were released on CD in 2009 by Dinesh Subasinghe with M entertainment.
