= KM Music Conservatory =

For-profit, Conservatoire College in Chennai, India

- KM College of Music and Technology
- Other name: KMMC
- Motto: Become the Future of Music
- Type: Conservatoire
- Established: 2008
- Founder: A. R. Rahman
- Affiliations: Middlesex University
- Principal: Fathima Rafiq
- Faculty: 15
- Undergraduates: 150
- Postgraduates: 100
- Location: Arumbakkam, Chennai, Tamil Nadu, India; 13.046186°N 80.217968°E
- Campus: Urban
- Colours: Black and Grey
- Nickname: KM Musiq
- Website: kmmc.in

KM Music Conservatory (KMMC) is a conservatoire college founded A. R. Rahman, located in Arumbakkam, Chennai, in the Indian state of Tamil Nadu, the conservatory offers a range of part-time and full-time courses in Carnatic music, Hindustani music, Western classical music and Music technology.

The conservatory acts as an incubator for professional musical collaboration through its in-house ensemble Qutub-E-Kripa. Formed in the mid-2010s by A. R. Rahman, Qutub-E-Kripa is a rotating collective consisting of advanced students and alumni from KMMC's diploma and technology programs. The group is frequently co-credited alongside Rahman for film scores and television projects, integrating traditional Carnatic music and Hindustani music with Western orchestral arrangements.

The Sunshine Orchestra was established in 2008 as a social initiative under the A. R. Rahman Foundation in association with KMMC. It provides free, full-scale classical music education to children from economically and socially underprivileged backgrounds.

== Faculty ==
Courses at KMMC are taught by an international group of full-time and part-time faculty from India, Europe and the US, specialising in musical performance, music theory and analysis, music history, musicology and music technology. Faculty experience includes professional work in the music industry as well as academic expertise in teaching and researching music in higher education.

KMMC is developing a newly founded symphony orchestra, to serve as resident studio orchestra for A. R. Rahman's compositions and to perform for the general public in Chennai and elsewhere in India.

In 2009 Sri Lankan composer Dinesh Subasinghe and Bangladesh composer Emon Saha became the first international students to join KMMC.

== KM College of Music and Technology ==
KMMC became a full-fledged college offering degrees and diplomas in 2013. Students of KM have participated for the composer and its founder A. R. Rahman's many movie scores, concerts and Audio CDs. Their first-ever official release was Rhyme Skool with Katrina Kaif with Sa Re Ga Ma Productions and Katrina Kaif.
