= Dinesh Subasinghe =

Sri Lankan composer, violinist and music producer (born 1979)

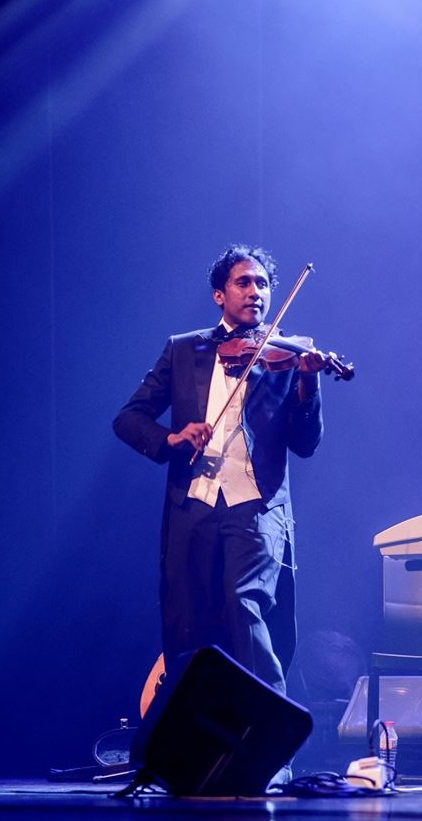
- Dinesh Subasinghe at the 'Devraka Tharu' concert 2018 at the Nelumpokuna Theater

Background information
- Born: 10 July 1979 (age 47); Colombo, Sri Lanka
- Genres: Film score, classical, Buddhist music, alternative rock, religious music, pop music, Celtic music, folk music, Sri Lankan Passion plays
- Occupations: Composer, violinist, music arranger, music producer, music director, actor
- Instruments: Violin, Ravanahatha, Guitar, Mandolin, Kingri, Ekthar, Banjo, Erhu
- Years active: 1998–present
- Label: M entertainment

Dinesh Subasinghe (born 10 July 1979) is a Sri Lankan composer, violinist, and music producer. He composed Karuna Nadee, a Buddhist oratorio, and re-introduced a lost, ancient musical instrument known as the ravanahatha to Sri Lanka. He is also a film and television composer whose works integrate western and eastern classical music with electronic music, Buddhist music, folk music, traditional orchestral arrangements, and world music genres. From 2002 to 2009 he led the pop classical band, Dee R Cee Members.

In 2015-2016 Dinesh received Sri Lankan attention for the film score of Ho Gaana Pokuna children movie. He has nominated for 10 film awards & won six awards out of that including Derana Film Awards, Presidential Film Awards, Hiru Golden Film Award & Signis Awards, in 2016-2017 . he became the most youngest composer to score music for 100 Tele-dramas for Sri Lankan TV.

Subasinghe received the Toyp Award Ten Outstanding Young Persons of the World (TOYP) in 2016 for his contribution to Sri Lankan arts. In 2018 he received the 'Asia Inspiration Award' at the 2nd south Asian youth summit. In 2019 he received the 'India Peace Prize' at the 3rd south Asian Youth summit in New Delhi India.

He did the music score for Sudu Andagena Kalu Awidin teledrama and directed music of 'Tone Poem'/Baila sade & Imorich tunes musical series.

== Early life ==
Subasinghe was born in Colombo, Sri Lanka in 1979. He studied at St Peter's College, Colombo and Maris Stella College in Negombo. He began playing music at a very young age. He studied music under Samantha Amarajeewa, Janaki Disanayaka, Christal Luduwike, and Patrick Master at his school and in the city. He also studied with B. Victor Perera, Mahinda Senivirathan, Kalani Perera, V.Hemapala Perera and Ananda Perera.

In 2001 Subasinghe started learning western classical music under Ashoka Jayawardhana, Hasini Helpe (daughter of Briget and Ashly Helpe) and Annada Dabare. Later they assisted Subasinghe in joining the Sri Lankan Symphony Orchestra.

He became a member of composer Stanley Peiris's orchestra. Subasinghe worked under the Sri Lankan composer Premasiri Khemadasa for eight years and led the orchestra for Khemdasa's opera Agni (2007–2008). From 2001 to 2005 he was a member of Sri Lankan musical groups led by Dumindu Kadigamuwa, Harsha Bulathsinghala, Janananth Warakagoda, and Dilup Gabadamudalige.

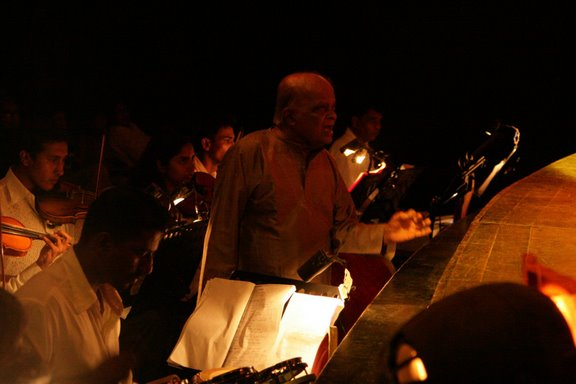
Khemadasa conducts Agni while Dinesh leads the orchestra

He began composing for television and film in 2004 when cinema director Chandrathna Mapitigama selected him to compose music for his television series Hummane. In 2009 he received a scholarship from Sri Lankan President Mahinda Rajapaksa to study music under A. R. Rahman at the KM Music Conservatory in India. At the conservatory, he won the Best Student Award in the instrumental section for violin.

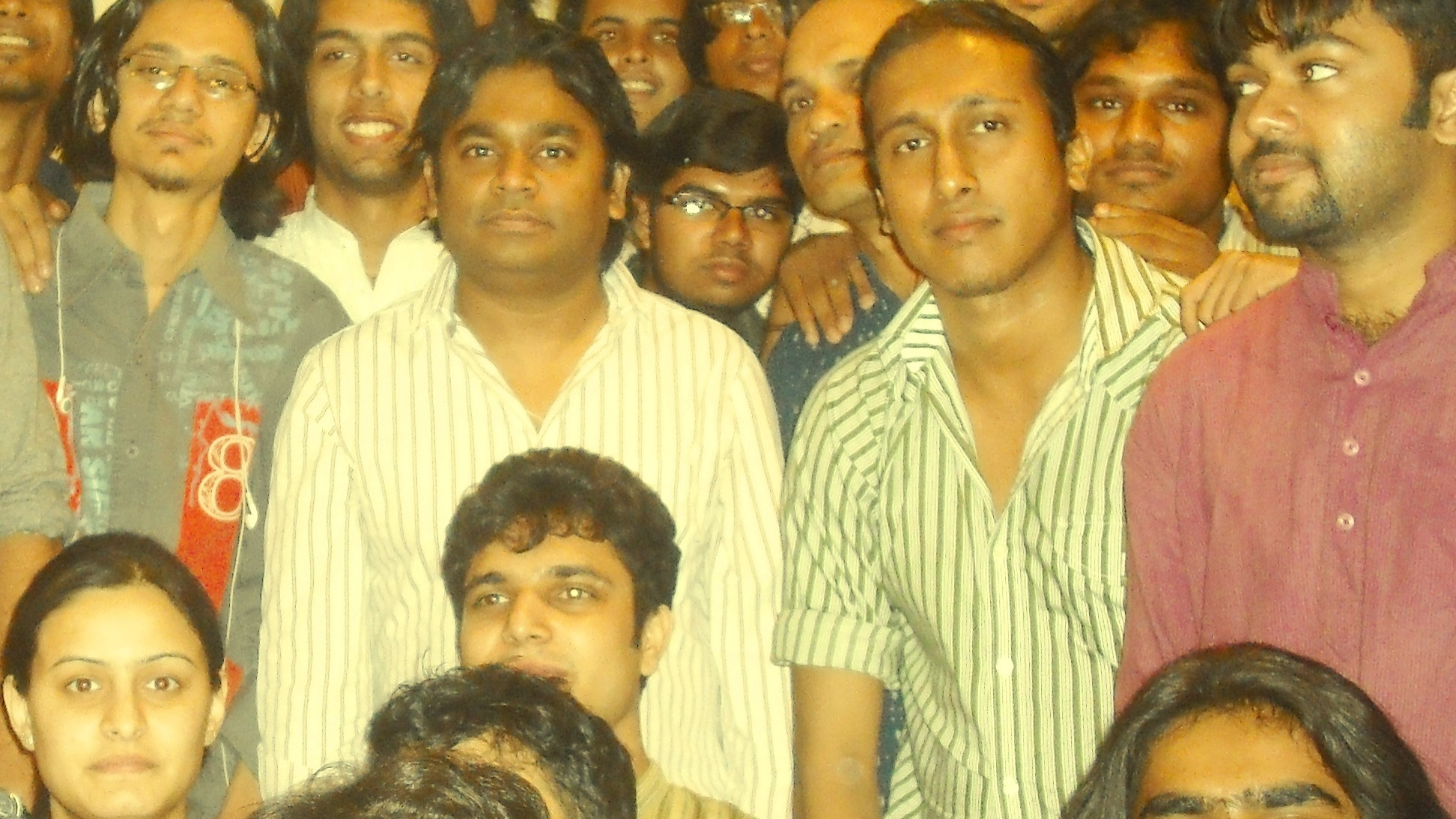
Dinesh Subasibghe with A.R.Rahman in KM Music Conservatory chennai 2010

== Career ==
=== Classical music ===
Subasinghe has composed a Buddhist oratorio, Karuna Nadee, as well as a symphony, trio, sonata, two a cappella pieces, a string quartet, a concerto for trumpet, and a piece for viola, The Dance of Salome. His string quartet, Night Before The Battle, was selected by Joel Thome's Orchestra of Our Time from 100 compositions from the world. He has composed music for 75 Sri Lankan television series, 13 films, and 16 stage plays

Subasinghe was the first Sri Lankan to write a cappella pieces with Sri Lankan national themes for SATB choirs, including "The Princes of the Lost Tribe" for Menaka De Shabandu's choir and "Ancient Queen of Somawathee" for Bridget Helpe's choir. The style of these compositions uses harmonies and a sound which is different from Western classical music traditions.

=== Alternative rock music ===
Subasinghe led the alternative rock music band Dee R Cee and introduced rock music into several Sri Lankan television series.

He performed at the 2011 Share the Love concert and on Rupavahini TV in February 2013 with the song "Ra Roo".

=== YouTube record ===
Subasinghe released an alternative-rock song "E Kale: The One" with Charmika Sirimanne and Ranushka Fernando in 2013, along with its music video created by Ranushka Fernando. It became the most viewed Sri Lankan music video on YouTube reaching more than 1.3 million viewers.

=== Musician, music director, actor, tours ===
Subasinghe has played as a musician for local and international music directors and composers, in 2002 Subasinghe recorded violin caprice to portrait Musila in Guthila balade play composed by Diliup Gabadamudalige.Guthila's violin has performed by Subasinghe's Teacher & a veteran violinist Kalani perera. Subasinghe worked for Symphony Orchestra of Sri Lanka from 2003 to 2005 as a Violinist. He was a member of the South Indian Cinema Musicians Union.

He has released four CDs: Rawan Nada, Feel My Heart, Sihina Wasanthayak soundtrack and Karuna Nadee.

Subasinghe's first professional acting appearance was in Parapura by Cletus Menids in 2012. He performed a leading role on his music video E Kale: The One and played King Herod Antipas in the 2013 Paasku television series by Prem Fernando.

He performed a series of concerts with Sri Lankan pop Bands Marians and Gypsies in 2019–2020.

=== Tours with Sri Lankan Artists ===
- Maldives-in 2014, his newly formed string quartet, Ravan, toured and performed at the Four Seasons Resort on Landaa Giraavaru in the Maldives.,
- Australia-Dinesh has toured with Del Studio musicians and performed in Melbourne & Sydney in Del Studio Australia tour in 2016,
- United Kingdom-Dinesh performed in F.O.C. (Festival of Cricket) UK in 2017
- New Zealand & Australia in 2020 Subasinghe performed with famous sri-lankan pop band Marians in 'Thaala' concert series along with Sr Lankan rock star Chitral Somapala. Concerts were held in Auckland, Melbourne and Sydney in month of February and March 2020.
- Kuwait in 2023 with Commercial Bank, the celebration 20 years of remittance operations in Kuwait

== Collaborations with International Music ==
With South Indian Cine Musicians

in 2009 during the academic stay in India Dinesh was invited to play with the South Indian Cine Musicians Union. He has been selected by late Das Daniel in KM Music conservatory. Dinesh got the temporally Membership of the Union and played for many south Indian & Bollywood movie background music scores as a violinist. In this time he met many veteran string players from Madras String Quartet M. Kalyan, N.S. Narasiman, Shekar.

Rhyme Skool with Katrina Kaif in KM Music Conservatory Chennai

Dinesh worked with his former principal A.R. Rahman and Katrina Kaif on her CD Rhyme Skool with Katrina Kaif produced by Sa Re Ga Ma Productions in India in 2009–2010.

Share the love Concert with Korea (2011)

Subasinghe participated in a joint Sadaham Sevana musical concert with Korea and India on 4 July 2011. He composed Mist of a Mountain, a tribute piece for Eastern Asia and has participated in many religious music projects around South Asia.

O'Connor Method in New York (2015/16)

In 2015 and 2016 Dinesh participated in the O'Connor Method Summer Camp in New York which was conducted by violinist Mark O'Connor.

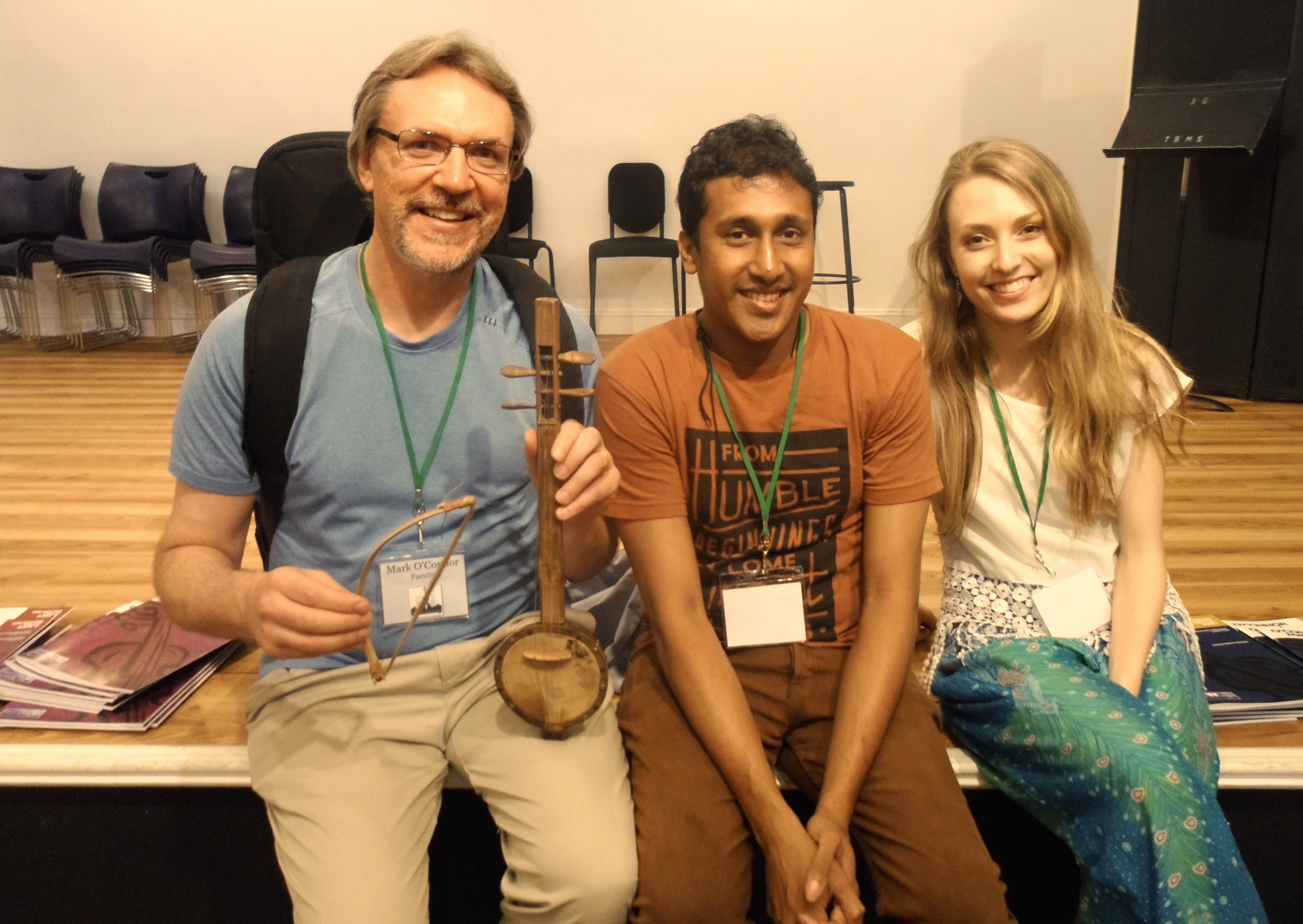
Subasinghe with Grammy winning Mark O'Connor & Maggie O'Connor During his Ravanahatha performance in New York 2016

AGBU in Armenia (2015)

Dinesh participated an Armenian music program in Armenia which was organised by AGBU (Armenian General Benevolent Union) in 2016.,

'T(H)REE'-A Musical Journey From Portugal To Asia (2016/17)'

Dinesh has taken part in an audio album which was a collaboration with Portugal's pop band Cla. The track is part of an album called 'T(H)REE-A Musical Journey From Portugal To Asia'. T(H)REE is a project that has been collaborating with Asian musicians and Portugal. The Portuguese Musicians are Cla, Peixe, Amelia Muge and Old Jerusalem, from Asia there are Indus Creed (India), Mangka (India), Dinesh Subasinghe (Sri Lanka), Sherine Tohamy, Mohammed Haddad (Bahrain), Mohichehra (Uzbekistan), Magic of Nomads (Kazakhstan). The album was produced by Portuguese producer David Valentim.

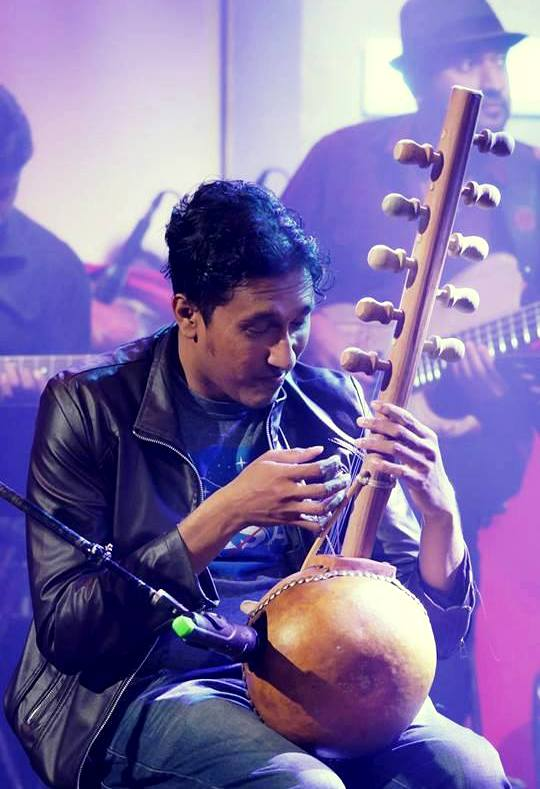
Dinesh Subasinghe Performing a Kora Lute

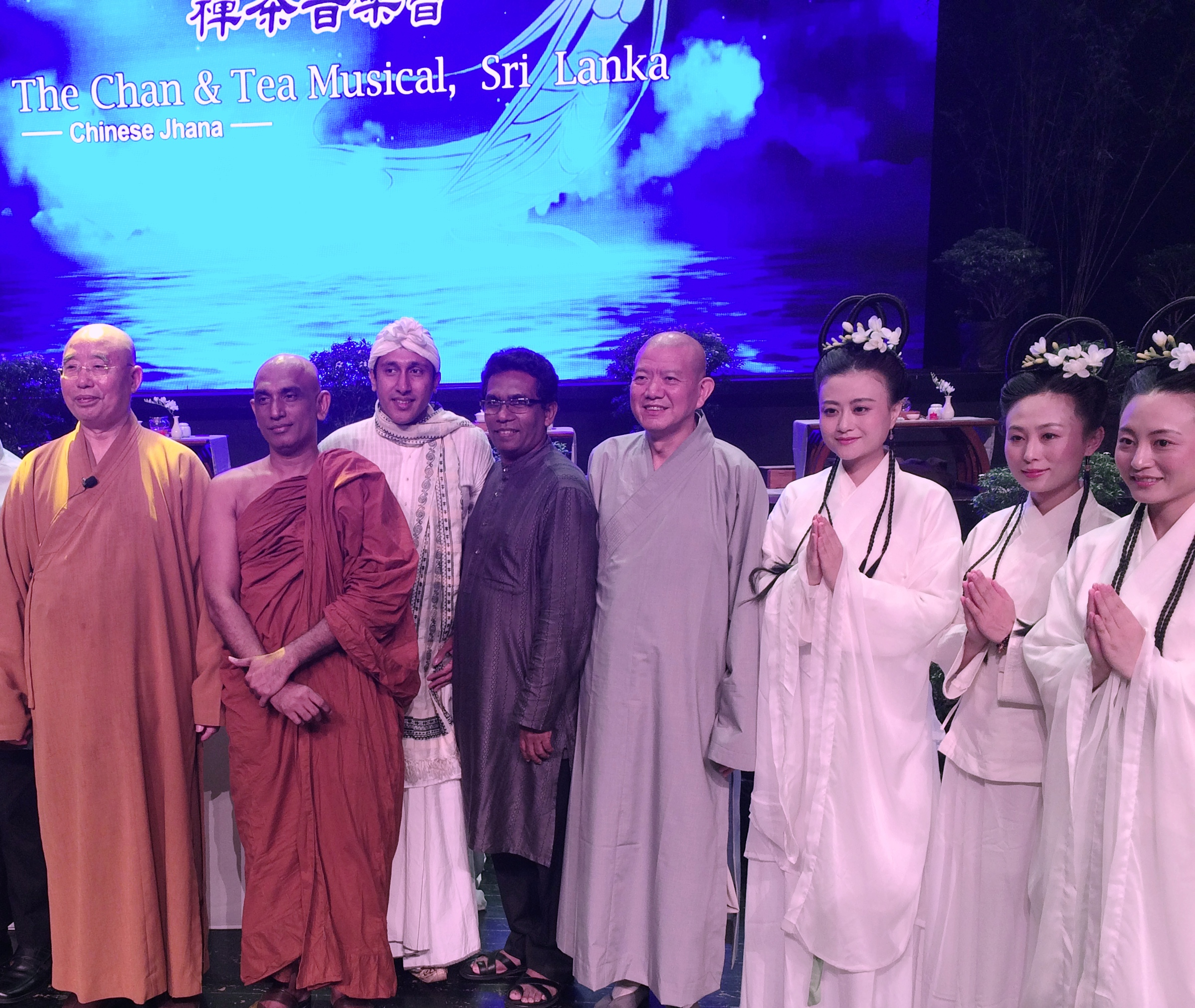
Subasinghe, Ven.Rathana with Ravibandu, Chinese spiritual performing team in Chan & Tea Spiritual Music program 2016

Chan & Tea Concert with Chinese Buddhist musicians (2016)

He composed a ballad theme music for Sri Lankan act in the 'Chan and Tea' concert at Nelumpokuna in 2016, Choreography part has been created by Ravibandu Vidyapathi, the program was a presidential event to enhance spiritual development between China and Sri Lanka.

2nd South Asian Youth Summit (2018) He has participated and performed with his Tone poem team in the South Asian Youth Summit held in Colombo with a participation of 35 countries. He has been invited by the president of the International Youth Service society Dr. K K Sing & Dinesh was honored in the ceremony with a token of appreciation for the contribution he has made in the event, also he won the Asia Inspiration award in this ceremony for his contribution to the South Asian youth music & Arts.

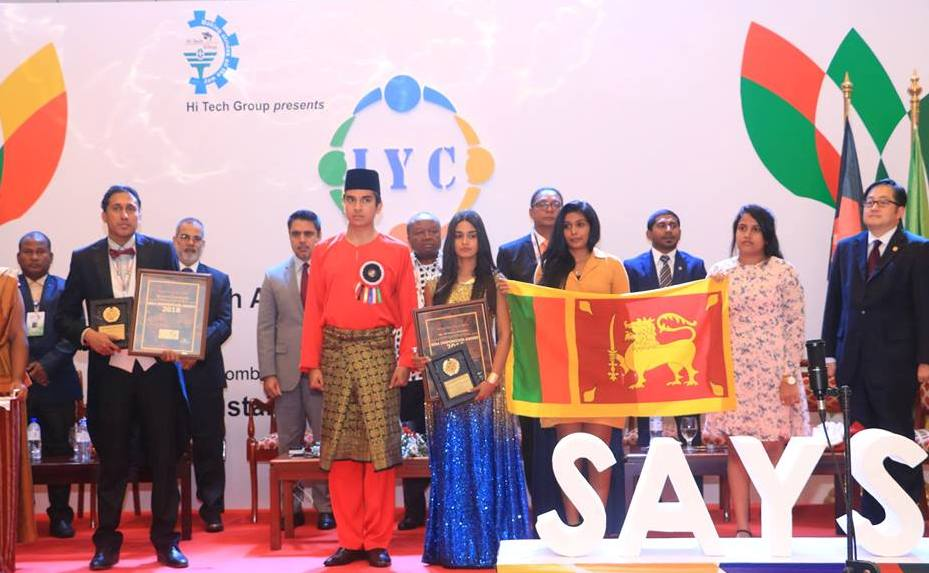
Subasinghe Winning the Asian Inspiration Award 2019

== Dee R Cee Members ==
From 2002 to 2009 Subasinghe led the pop classical bands, Dee R Cee and Dinesh and Friends. The other members of Dee R Cee were singers Ranuka Sudam and Chandumal Samapriya. Their music encompassed multiple genres, including pop, alternative rock, cinema music, Hindustan classical, country and western, baila and 1970s music. Hemanalin Karunarathne invited Dee R Cee members to direct music for television programs on the Swarnawahini TV network including Hansa vila, Haa haa pura, Gee TV, and Christmas Night 2005. Dee R Cee members also appeared on Sirasa TV and Derana TV providing music for Looks Like, Auto Plus, Hansavilla, Mathra, and Christmas programmes in 2006 and 2007, and a Valentine's Day programme on Derana TV.

== Ravanahatha ==
In 2007, Subasinghe used the ancient instrument the ravanahatha to Sri Lanka on his album Rawan Nada, comprising 12 instrumentals and background vocals. The ravanahatha (ravanhatta, rawanhattha, ravanastron, or ravana hasta veena) is a bowed fiddle popular in Western India. It is believed to have originated among the Hela civilisation of Sri Lanka at the time of King Ravana.

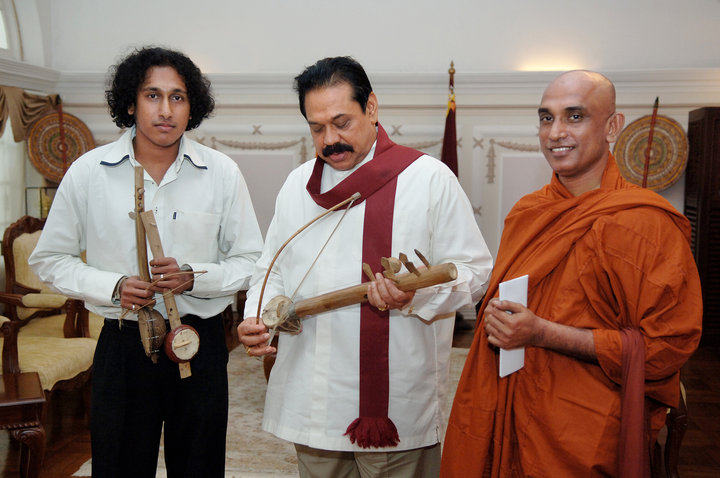
Legend of Sri Lankan Ravanhatha, previous Sri Lankan President (holding a Ravanahatha) and Venerable Rathna Thero

Ravana Nada is the first recording to include music played on the ravanahatha, although it had appeared in films as a visual item. On this CD Subasinghe performed with a slightly different version of the instrument. He also played it on A. R. Rahman's Rhyme Skool with Katrina Kaif, which was narrated by Kaif, and for some Indian Tamil movie music.,

In addition to the ravanahatha, Subasinghe is reviving another ancient bowed instrument called the kingiri.

Since 2007 Subasinghe has tried to discover the similarity between the Ravan and the Kingri (string instrument). He has mentioned to the media that the instrument is discussed the book by Abele and Niederheitmann translated by John Broadhouse The Violin: Its History & Construction, Illustrated & described, From Many Sources published by William Reeves in London between 1900 and 1930.

In the same year he asked the Cultural Minister Mahinda Yapa Abewardhana to have his staff research the history of the ravanahatha. He feels that it is important that Sri Lanka claim the rights for this ancient fiddle.

Subasinghe's version of the ravanahatha has been referred to by Michael Ondaatje the Canadian novelist and poet who won the Booker Prize for his novel The English Patient. His brother, Sir Christopher Ondaatje, in an article on the ravanahatha, cites it as the mother of today's violin.

Subasinghe's Rawan Nada album set a record as the highest selling instrumental music CD in Sri Lanka. Released on the Tharanga label, owned by Vijay Ramanayaka, the CD was Dinesh's first solo album and the first solo album using this historical instrument. It sold 16,000 copies between the years 2009 and 2015.

Dinesh started using Ravanahatha for his musical compositions and became a modern composer who use this isolated instrument in cinematic and commercial music

== Buddhist oratorio, Karuna Nadee ==
In 2010, Subasinghe composed Karuna Nadee (River of Kindness) an oratorio for chorus and orchestra based on the life of Buddha. According to the Sri Lankan newspaper The Daily Mirror, it is the first Buddhist oratorio and the first musical work based on Buddha's life and philosophy since Premasiri Khemadasa's cantata Pirinivan Mangalya, a requiem based on Buddha's Parinirvana. However, the American composer Dudley Buck composed an oratorio on the life of Buddha, The Light of Asia, which was first performed in 1887. Buddhist texts have also been incorporated into two other western oratorios, Somei Satoh's 1987 Stabat Mater and Jonathan Harvey's 2011 Weltethos.

The oratorio consists of 12 pieces of music and, according to the Daily News, is composed in "Far Eastern, Sri Lankan, Indian, and Western classical styles". It also includes a Buddhist chant in the background, as well as elements from Tibetan music and folk and pop genres. It was his first major work since coming home for a break from the A. R. Rahman Academy in India. Buddhist monk Athuraliye Rathana Thero and Negombo astrologer Ranushka Fernando contributed ideas to the conceptualization of the work. The work, with Subasinghe playing some of the music has been released on CD.

== Passion plays and other religious music ==
Subasinghe has composed music for Sri Lankan Passion plays. His music for these plays combines a variety of styles and genres, including Gregorian chant, western classical music, Portuguese music, and Sri Lankan folk music. In 2000, Sri Lanka's Catholic Media Unit and Tower Hall Theater Foundation organised a passion play cultural programme at Negombo, where they assembled all the traditional passion play drama teams from all parts of the country. Subasinghe was appointed music director for the programme.

In 1999, 2000, and 2001, Sri Lankan dramatist, Peter Wellambage, Subasinghe and composer Jayantha Modarage, participated in the production of a modern Sri Lankan passion play, Kurusiya Matha Miyadunemi, performed in the Katuwapitiya and Bolawalana villages in Negombo. Subasinghe created the music for the passion play Aho mage senageni performed in 2003 and 2007 in Helpe, Katana near Negombo. It was directed by Alexius Fernando and used the traditional Oberammergau Passion Play costumes for the first time in a Sri Lankan passion play. He has since continued his involvement with the Aho mage senageni project.

In 2008, Subasinghe composed music for an audio remake of the 1970s Katu Otunna stage drama audio CD and Duwa historic passion play which is based on the story of Jesus and was directed by Clement Fernadao. In 2012, 18 Sri Lankan cinema and television stars participated in the passion play Sri Kurusawalokanaya Thambakanda, which was produced by Pream Fernanado and directed by Peter Wellambage with music by Subasinghe. Jeewan Kumaranatunga played the role of Jesus. In 2013, Subasinghe composed music for the passion play in St Anthony's Church in Dalupotha, Negombo.

Subasinghe composed the music for the 2013 television film based on the life of Jesus, Jesu Christu Yuga Peraliya, produced by Prem Fernando. He also served as assistant director and script editor, and played the role of Herod Antipas. Jewan Kumarathunga played the role of Jesus while Ravindra Randeniya played Pontius Pilate. More than 25 Sri Lankan cinema and television stars participated.

== Awards and nominations ==
Dinesh has won the best music score at the 2009 Sri Lankan SIGNIS Awards for Siri Sirimal, a Sri Lankan television adaptation of Mark Twain's Tom Sawyer. and Sumathi Awards in 2012 for Pinsara Dosthara, a Sri Lankan adaptation of Strange Case of Dr Jekyll and Mr Hyde.

Best Original Score Awards

Year	Film, TV Series	Award Festival	Category	Result
2009	Siri Sirimal TV Series	Signis Awards	Best Music score Golden Award	Won
2012	Pinsara Dosthara TV series	Sumathi Awards	Best Music Director Award	Won
2015	WarigaPojja movie	3rd Derana Film Awards	Best Music original score	Nominated
2016	Ho Gaana Pokuna movie	4th Derana Film Awards	Best Music original score.	Won
2016	Ho Gana Pokuna Movie	2nd Hiru Golden Film Awards 2016	Best Music original score	Nominated
2016	Ho Gana Pokuna Movie	Signis Awards	Best Music original score	Won
2016	Ho Gana Pokuna Movie	Sarasaviya Awards 2016	Best Music original score	Nominated
2017	Ho Gana Pokuna Movie	Presidential Film Awards for 2015	Best Music original score	Nominated
2020	Sudu Andagena Kalu Awidin	16th Raigam Tele'es for 2019	Best Music Director (Original Score)	Nominated,
2026	Devi Kusumasana Movie	Sarasaviya Awards for 2026	Best Music original score	Nominated

Most Popular Movie Song Awards

Year	Film, TV Series	Category	Result
2015	WarigaPojja	3rd Derana Film Awards for Most Popular Film Song	Won
2016	Ho Gaana Pokuna movie	4th Derana Film Awards for Most Popular Film Song	Won
2016	Ho Gaana Pokuna Movie	2nd Hiru Golden Film Awards	Won
2026	Devi Kusumasana	37th Sarasaviya Awards for Most Popular Film Song	Won

Best Movie Song of the year

2016	Ho Gaana Pokuna Movie	Hiru Golden Film Awards	Nominated
2017	Ho Gaana Pokuna Movie	Presidential Film Awards for 2015	Won

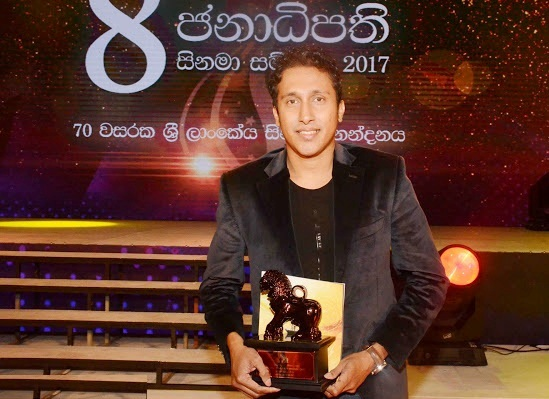
Dinesh Subasinghe with the Presidential Award in 2017 for Ho Gana Pokuna Movie theme song

Special Awards

- 2011 Special Jury Award at the Light of Asia Foundation Buddhist Film Festival for the Buddha oratorio Karuna Nadee
- 2016 Merit Award at Sarasaviya Awards for Ho Gaana Pokuna.,
- 2016 'TOYP' Ten Outstanding Young Persons of the World (TOYP) Award for contribution to Sri Lankan Arts.
- 2018 Honorary gesture of respect Award at the 'Bhava' Concert By St.Peters College Colombo 4
- 2018 'Asia Inspiration Award' at the 2nd South Asian youth Summit
- 2018 'Toke of Love' to Tone Poem Team at the 2nd South Asian Youth Summit
- 2019 'India Peace Prize' at the 3rd south Asian Youth Summit in India

== Discography ==
Subasinghe has composed music for 100 teledramas, 21 movie scores, 21 stage plays, 11 documentaries, 14 audio albums,11 Musical Series's etc. He has become the youngest composer to write 75 teledrama scores for Sri Lankan TV media. Subasinghe received the 2012 best music director Sumathi award for his creations in 'Pinsara Dosthara' becoming the youngest to receive the prestigious award in the award's 18-year history.

=== Notable Scores ===
Movies

- Ho Gaana Pokuna
- WarigaPojja
- Dr. Nawariyan
- Yugathra
- Guththila
- Sri Siddha
- Devi Kusumasana

TV Series

- Siri Sirimal
- Sihina Wasanthayak
- Sudu Andagena Kalu Awidin
- Can You Hear Me? (2020 TV series)
- Pinsara Dosthara
- Dewlie
- Akadawariya
- Snap
- Number 9
- Teacher Amma

== See also ==
- List of popular music violinists
- Ravanahatha
