= Shreen Abdul Saroor =

Sri Lankan women's rights activist (born 1969)

- ஷ்ரீன் அப்துல் சரூர்
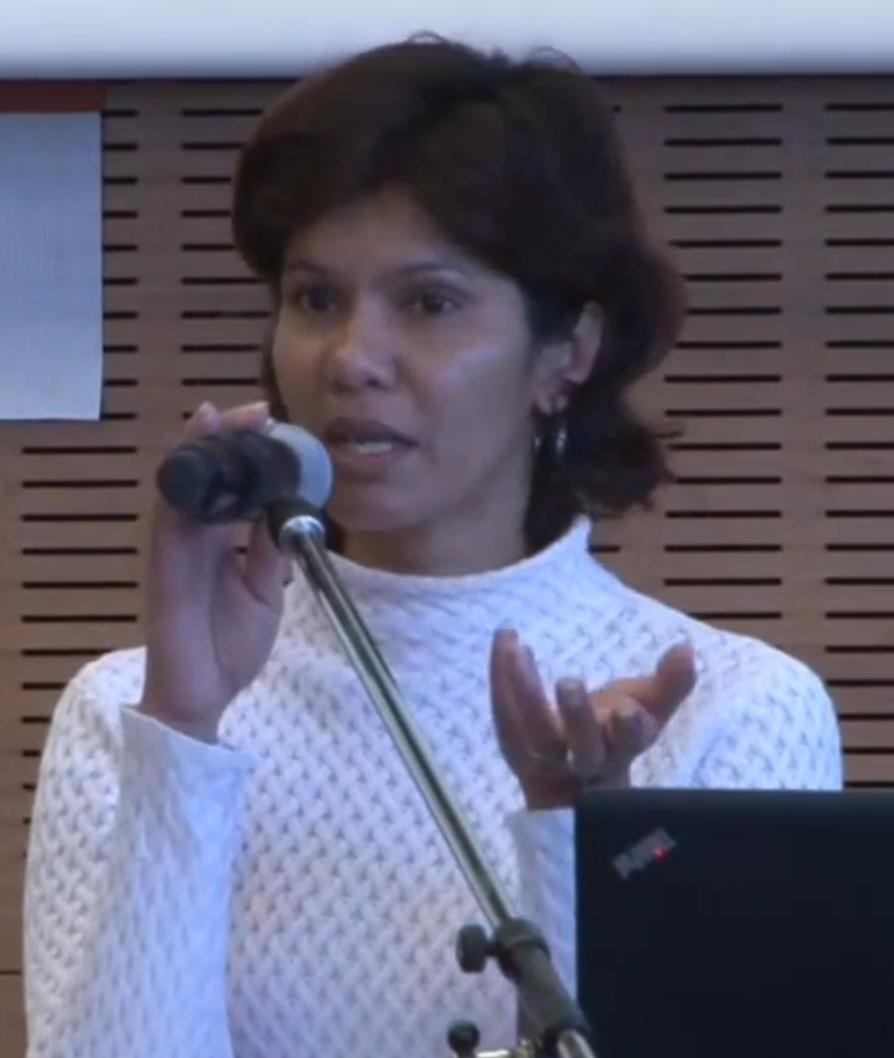
- Shreen Abdul Saroor in 2014
- Born: 1969 (age 56–57); Mannar, Northern Province, Ceylon
- Education: University of Colombo (BBA)
- Occupations: Activist, writer
- Organization(s): Mannar Women's Development Federation (MWDF); Women's Action Network (WAN)
- Known for: Women's rights advocacy
- Shreen Saroor's voice Shreen Abdul Saroor speaking about the end of the Sri Lankan Civil War; Recorded February 2014

Shreen Abdul Saroor (Tamil: ஷ்ரீன் அப்துல் சரூர் Ṣrīṉ Aptul Carūr; born 1969) is a Sri Lankan peace and women's rights activist. Saroor founded the Mannar Women's Development Federation (MWDF) to support women affected by the Sri Lankan civil war. She also works toward a united Sri Lankan women's movement under the umbrella organization, the Women's Action Network (WAN).

Saroor grew up in the north of Sri Lanka and experienced the violence of the civil war firsthand. In 1990, her family was forcibly removed from their home in Mannar and had to relocate to an internally displaced persons camp. Her father created a community organisation to help displaced people in the camp, and Saroor volunteered with him. Saroor's experiences in the civil war, particularly its impact on women, along with her experience volunteering with her father, influenced her to pursue advocating for women. This culminated in the creation of the MWDF in 1998. Throughout most of the civil war, the MWDF assisted women experiencing war-related gender issues such as widowing, wartime rape and child soldier recruitment. After the war ended, Saroor formed WAN in 2010 to advocate for women's issues throughout Sri Lanka, including through law reform and legal assistance.

Saroor has been recognised by international NGOs as a leader in the Sri Lankan peace and women's rights movements. Her work includes micro-credit loan programs, domestic violence advocacy and support, and reconciliation between Sri Lanka's ethnic and religious groups. She also advocates for reforms to Sri Lanka's Muslim laws, campaigns for the rights of female workers, and fights against Islamophobia.

== Early life ==
Saroor was born in 1969 to a Tamil-speaking Muslim family in Mannar, Northern Province, Sri Lanka (then Ceylon). Growing up, Saroor lived in a multi-religious neighborhood where Tamil-speaking Hindus, Muslims, and Christians coexisted peacefully. When she was a child, her father, an education officer and former PE teacher, allowed her freedoms uncommon for Muslim girls. He taught Saroor how to climb trees, and encouraged her to participate in sports like martial arts, weightlifting, and 100m races from a young age. Her mother became concerned about her tomboy-like behaviour, and sent Saroor to a Catholic convent for her education. During Saroor's school years, the Liberation Tigers of Tamil Eelam (LTTE) would host recruitment events aimed at children. Two of Saroor's classmates dropped out of school to become child soldiers for the LTTE. Saroor recalled not being bullied by the Catholics or Hindus in her school, although she was distrusted for being a Muslim due to fears she would disclose information about the LTTE to the government.

Following the start of the Sri Lankan civil war, the Sri Lankan government started issuing curfews in Mannar. During these curfews, Saroor's neighbours would gather at her family's house. Saroor enjoyed the curfews as a reason to be with her neighbours, stating "it was like a festival... I almost forgot we were in the middle of a war." During the mid-1980s, attacks between Tamil militants and the army became commonplace in Mannar. The LTTE would give civilian members warnings before attacks were to take place, and most civilians would take refuge in neighbouring villages. Saroor and her family, however, would stay behind with her grandfather who refused to leave. Saroor and her brothers would hide in a bunker while the fighting took place, where they could hear bombings and firefights. When the LTTE took control of most of the Northern Province, the Sri Lankan government sanctioned the province, leading to what Saroor remembered as "days we did not have enough medicine, food, fertilizers, fuel, or electricity". The government enforced and subsequently lifted embargoes throughout the civil war, which a UN report found "systematically deprived persons in the conflict zone of humanitarian assistance, in the form of food and basic medical supplies".

As the war progressed, the government of Sri Lanka sowed division between the Muslim and Tamil populations in the Eastern Province in an attempt to divide and rule the nation's minorities. While this policy was not successful in the north, it did lead to increased hostility and suspicion between the two groups. In 1987, Saroor found the body of a family-friend hanging from a lamppost with a sign on his neck that read "traitor". The man was a non-violent Tamil nationalist but was killed by the LTTE because of his connections to the Muslim population, who the LTTE perceived as military informants.

After the Indo-Sri Lanka Accord was signed in 1987, Indian Peacekeeping Force (IPKF) troops entered Sri Lanka to disarm militant groups. Saroor, as head-girl of her convent, participated in a welcoming ceremony for the peacekeeping forces, placing garlands on officers. Shortly after the arrival of the IPKF, life became more chaotic in Mannar, with frequent clashes between the LTTE and smaller militant factions. Saroor frequently saw dead bodies on her walks to school and recalled witnessing the murder of an officer of one organisation, stating "I saw someone put a hand grenade in his mouth. His whole head blew up, spreading his body parts and blood several yards around." Further fighting between the LTTE and IPKF led to the deaths of many people Saroor personally knew. Saroor and many others in the North grew disdainful of the IPKF, who they saw as causing more issues than they solved. Saroor went on to participate in anti-IPKF demonstrations alongside Tamils, where she would march and throw stones at IPKF forces. As the IPKF began raiding houses in Mannar and raping teenage girls, Saroor's mother cut her hair and asked her to wear her brother's clothes when raids were ongoing out of fear of what the soldiers would do to her. According to analyses of women members of the LTTE, the trauma of rape was a motivating factor for joining the LTTE, as some members sought revenge or protection. After witnessing the aftermath of mutual violence between the LTTE and IPKF, Saroor became disillusioned with violent armed struggle.

== Education and displacement ==
Despite her good grades in school, Saroor's father originally urged her to get married and not further her education; however, he was persuaded to allow it by one of the convent's sisters. He then insisted that Saroor get an English education in the south, far from the conflict. In 1989, she moved to the south and attended the University of Colombo, where she studied business administration. Saroor did not speak the majority language, Sinhala, when she moved to the south and was frequently humiliated due to her linguistic and ethnic ties to the Tamil community. As a freshman, Saroor underwent ragging, where she was called "Tiger" and had her accent mocked. Her studies were interrupted in 1990 when her family was forcibly removed from their home in Mannar by the LTTE as part of the Expulsion of Muslims from the Northern Province of Sri Lanka, which Saroor considers to be ethnic cleansing. The LTTE destroyed the only bridge connecting Mannar Island to the mainland and forced the Muslims to evacuate by small fishing boats. Saroor's father was in Colombo at the time of the evacuation, seeing off a group of Muslims on their pilgrimage to Mecca. He urged government officials and members of parliament to provide proper ships to evacuate those fleeing the island, but the government refused. Instead, the government imposed military checkpoints to prevent the refugees from settling in certain areas of Sri Lanka. A Tamil neighbor told Saroor and her father in Colombo that the Muslims were fleeing to Puttalam district, south of Mannar. There, local Muslims had set up emergency camps for the Mannar refugees. Saroor and her father left Colombo to Puttalam to find her mother and brothers. Saroor's family had escaped on a fishing boat and arrived on a beach in Kalpitiya. Saroor met her mother and brothers in Puttalam but had to wait three days to find one of her brothers who originally went missing in the evacuation.

Soon after the expulsion, Saroor's father got a job as a principal for a school in the south, which spared her family from life in the refugee camps. Her father set up a community organisation to assist refugees in the camp. He raised funds and contacted international organisations to raise awareness of the conditions faced by the displaced Muslims. Saroor participated in the organisation and, through her father, learned how to organise grassroots movements and be a community leader. Shortly after moving to the south, Saroor's father died of a heart attack. As the eldest child, she began working to support her family and help them find a new home. Saroor and her family moved to the south where they faced discrimination. Following suicide bombings by the LTTE in Colombo, the government introduced security checkpoints. As Mannar was seen as a training site for suicide bombers, Saroor was constantly detained at checkpoints while officers verified that she was not a member of the LTTE.

Following her graduation in 1994, Saroor worked as a marketing manager for a blue-chip company for two years. Throughout her time in school and work, she continued to volunteer in the community organisation her father formed. Saroor observed the problems faced by those living in camps for internally displaced persons. Local host communities began viewing the refugees with hostility for what they saw as hogging scarce resources, and men in the camp began turning to alcohol and gambling. Some women in these camps came to have more power than they traditionally had due to the absence of the men in their lives. They worked together to face problems in the camp, like routine maintenance, and negotiated with government officials to get proper food for those in the camps. However, Islamic fundamentalism became more common, and women were told how to dress. Saroor stated, "In my early childhood, I do not remember northern Muslim women covering their heads... even someone like my mother or grandmother, who was very modest and devout, did not wear hijab." Scholars Imtiyaz and Iqbal argue that the displaced Muslims received inadequate assistance in these camps, and that they were "orphaned" by politicians, including the Sri Lanka Muslim Congress who "could not achieve anything substantial for them, not even a commitment from the Government to compensate the Muslims of the North for the losses they suffered due to the expulsion, or even to get an assurance that all the displaced Muslims would be re-settled."

In 1999, Saroor enrolled in a graduate program focusing on gender issues. That same year she got married. Under Sri Lanka's Muslim Marriage and Divorce Act (MMDA), women are not allowed to sign their own marriage certificate; a man in their family must do so instead. Saroor was originally promised by the qazi that she would be able to sign her marriage certificate, but on the day of the wedding her brother was asked to sign for her. Saroor was able to stall the ceremony and have a Hanafi qazi officiate the ceremony and let her sign her own certificate.

== Advocacy ==
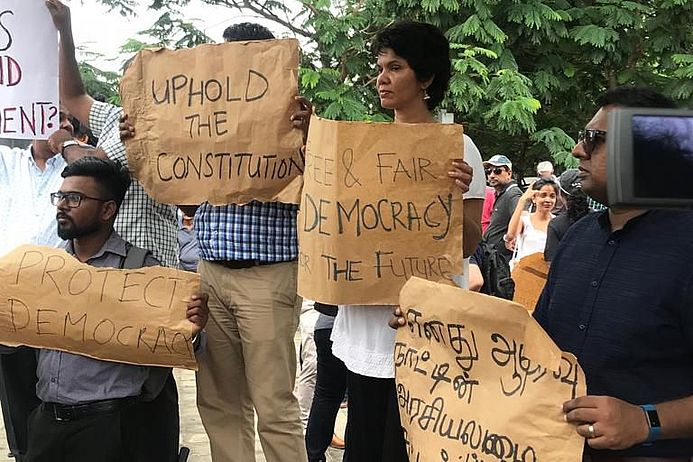
Shreen Saroor (centre) at a protest in Colombo, 2018.

=== Early years and founding of MWDF ===
Eight years after their displacement, Saroor and a group of displaced women visited Mannar in 1998 to discuss the possibility of their resettlement. Saroor visited her family's home to find a stranger living in it, himself living there because he was displaced after his village was destroyed. While on Mannar Island, Saroor met several women who had become head of household due to the conflict but lacked the means to earn an income to support their families. She met a widow who lost a leg from a landmine explosion who had developed a plan to start a business but had been denied loans from banks due to her disability. After her visit to Mannar, Saroor and a school friend decided to start an organisation to support women affected by the conflict. Saroor and her friend met with a group of people who had been working with Tamil orphans and widows to discuss issues such as gender equality and security, but the group was hesitant to support their ideas. They agreed to support economic empowerment for women, so Saroor and her friend focused on building a microcredit program. A priest set up a meeting for Saroor with an NGO consortium, but the men running it dismissed the need for an organisation that focused solely on the needs of women. After the meeting, Saroor and her friend went to her old convent and met with their old principal to explain their idea, which several teachers supported. This led to the creation of the Mannar Women’s Development Federation (MWDF) in October 1998. The organization was created with the mission of empowering women heads of household and women returning from displacement "through income-generation projects and micro-credit loans, while promoting coexistence and peace between the two politically divided communities." After raising their first $50, MWDF gave their first loan to the landmine victim Saroor had met to open a business. Within six months, the MWDF had 5,000 members and had raised $5,000. The MWDF was able to recruit 15,000 female members from 43 villages, which made them eligible to receive micro-credit loans.

Over the next two years, some Muslim families started to return to Mannar. Several returning women refused to work with the MWDF at first because of the involvement of Saroor's Tamil classmate in the organization. MWDF held monthly dialogues with the Muslim community to gain their trust and provide skill training sessions for women. Saroor stressed that the Muslim women's participation in the MWDF would give them the opportunity to discuss their grievances with Tamil women and come to an understanding. In the beginning, Saroor had to mediate between and meet with the Tamil and Muslim women separately, but eventually, Muslim and Tamil women grew to trust each other and work together. In addition to the microcredit program and skill training, the MWDF also provides education regarding family planning and distributes birth control pills to help keep women out of the childbirth-induced cycle of poverty. The MWDF also addresses domestic violence in Mannar. They train gender-sensitive men to confront male abusers, hold silent protests outside the homes of abusers, and provide counseling to battered women. During the civil war, the MWDF was ordered to shut down multiple times and some of the co-founders had to flee the country due to threats from the government and LTTE. The MWDF has also been subject to government surveillance. By 2017, MWDF had assisted women in 112 villages in Sri Lanka. The MWDF has also assists widows in various resettlement villages who lost their husbands in the civil war.

In 2000, Saroor started a reconciliation program to create mutual understanding between youths of Sri Lanka's different ethnic and religious groups. It started with Tamil and Muslim students, who would meet and share stories with one another about their lives in conflict. After the ceasefire between the army and LTTE in 2002, Saroor was able to convince the youths to travel south to meet Sinhalese youths. They travelled to a village in the North Central Province in June 2002 and stayed with a Sinhalese family. It was the first time many of the students met Sinahlese people outside of government officials. Following the success of this interaction, the Tamils and Muslims hosted a group of Sinhalese youth when they visited the north. After these two exchanges, the students and their parents exchanged letters with one another.

Following the arrest of two Tamil women in Mannar in 2001 by Sri Lankan navy officers in which the women were tortured and raped, women in Mannar went to the MWDF to see what could be done. Not wanting to compromise the organisation's political neutrality, the MWDF organised a march under the banner of members of the community, rather than as MWDF. Approximately 7,000 women from different religions attended the protest in Mannar. The protest was part of a broader series of protests in the east and north of Sri Lanka protesting various cases of sexual violence against Tamil women. The MWDF started a petition for the government to transfer the officers responsible and appoint a special commission to investigate the case, appealing to international human rights organisations for support. Organisations like Amnesty International, World Organisation Against Torture, and the United Nations Special Rapporteur on Torture highlighted the issue and called on the Sri Lankan government to bring justice to the victims. Following international pressure, President Chandrika Kumaratunga appointed a special commission to investigate, and the case became "a landmark case in the Sri Lanka women's struggle" as the female victims were able to identify the perpetrators in a lineup for the first time in court.

In 2002, Saroor quit her prestigious but high-pressure job as a marketing manager in the private sector to join the Canadian International Development Agency (CIDA). Saroor was tasked with CIDA's gender equality project for Sri Lanka. At this time, Saroor also urged the organisation she previously worked with in the Puttalam refugee camp to prioritise gender issues.

=== International recognition and WAN ===
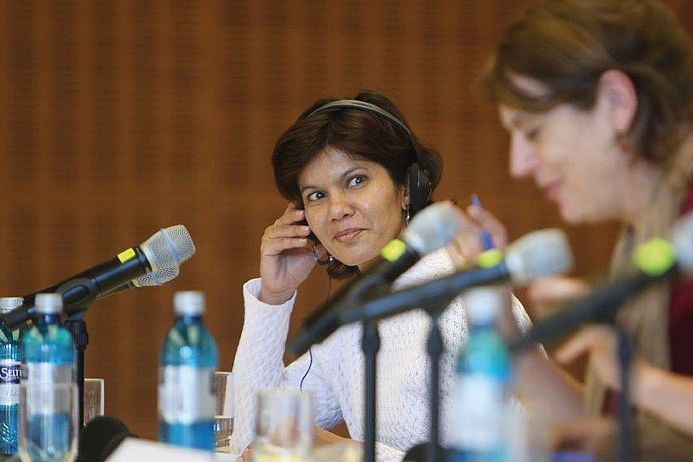
Shreen Saroor at the Beyond Aid panel at the Goethe University Frankfurt in 2014.

In 2005, Saroor was awarded a fellowship from Echoing Green to build a Model Resettlement Village (MRV). The purpose of the MRV was to support coexistence and reconciliation with widowers of different faiths who became heads of household due to the civil war.

In 2010, Saroor brought together nine women's groups to form the multi-ethnic umbrella organisation, Woman's Action Network (WAN). As well as fighting legal cases for women facing gender-based violence and war-related issues, WAN advocates for policy reform. One of the organisation's goals is to reform Muslim laws in Sri Lanka, particularly the Muslim Marriage and Divorce Act (MMDA) that violates the Convention on the Elimination of all forms of Discrimination Against Women by allowing child marriage and preventing a woman from divorcing her husband. They also aim to reform the Thesavalamai Law, which prevents married Tamil women from transferring their dowry without their husbands consent.

Saroor also established the Women's Organization Working for Disability (WOWD). The organization aims to unite women injured in the civil war to fight for reparation and justice. As a result of the group's advocacy, $2.8 million was allocated for the welfare of women injured by war in Sri Lanka's 2018 national budget.

Following the 2019 Sri Lanka Easter bombings and subsequent anti-Muslim riots, Saroor has been outspoken about Islamophobia and violence targeting Muslims in Sri Lanka. She has accused the government of Gotabaya Rajapaksa of promoting hate speech and misinformation against Muslims. She has also criticised the government's targeting of Muslim women wearing traditional clothing through laws and harassment following the bombings. In particular, the dress code of the Supreme Court of Sri Lanka was modified in 2023 to prevent female Muslim lawyers and judges from wearing abaya.

Saroor has also been outspoken about the rights of Sri Lankan migrant workers, whose working conditions she equates to modern-day slavery. She advocates for alleviation of the plight of female migrants workers, as well as voting rights for migrant workers. Female migrant workers in domestic servitude, particularly in the Middle East, face frequent abuse and lack protections from the Sri Lankan government. In addition to physical abuse, these women also face sexual abuse, including sex trafficking. Sri Lankan migrant workers are unable to vote in the country's elections, as absentee voting is not allowed.

As an author, Saroor contributes to various Sri Lankan news sites including the Colombo Telegraph. In 2021, Saroor edited the release of the book Muslims in the Post-War Sri Lanka: Repression, Resistance and Reform. The book collects essays from Muslim activists and academics in Sri Lanka who highlight issues faced by the community following the Sri Lankan civil war.

During and following the 2024 Sri Lankan parliamentary election, in which women's representation in parliament rose by 75%, the MWDF and WAN recorded an increase in online misogyny targeting female politicians. In particular, Saroor noted the use of social media platforms by male candidates to spread misinformation about female candidates. She also noted smear campaigns brought against women working to reform the MMDA, and transphobia against Sri Lanka's first openly transgender candidate, Chanu Nimesha. The MWDF and WAN demanded a series of reforms, including criminalizing online sexual harassment and disinformation, public digital literacy and gender equity education, and Sinhalese and Tamil language moderation for gender issues on social media.

In September 2025, Saroor was appointed as a commissioner to Sri Lanka's newly created National Commission on Women. The commission is tasked with the creation and implementation of a national policy on women's empowerment and investigating women's rights abuses. Following the establishment of the commission, several members stated that the commission has been unable to do the work it has been tasked with due to failing to provide the commission with funding, staff, or a dedicated office. The commission met with Prime Minister Harini Amarasuriya in November 2025 to discuss the issue, and Saroor and Ramani Jayasundere, chair of the commission, wrote a letter to President Anura Kumara Dissanayake urging him to address the issue. As of January 2026, the issue remained unsolved, leading Jayasundere to resign from her post as chairperson.

== Awards ==
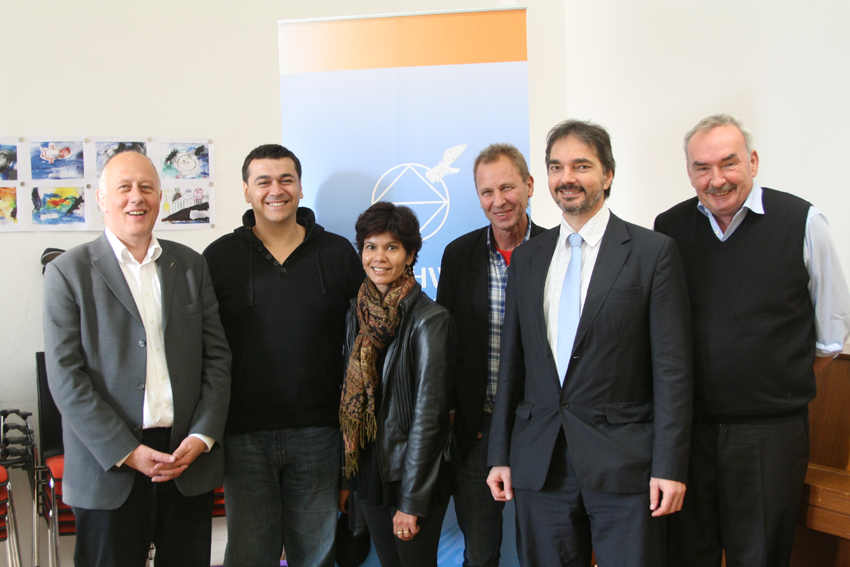
Saroor (centre) with other winners of the Bremen Peace Award in 2011

In 2004, Saroor received the Woman PeaceMaker award from the Joan B. Kroc Institute for Peace and Justice. In 2008 she was awarded the Voices of Courage award by the International Rescue Committee's Women's Refugee Commission for her advocacy for internally displaced women.

Saroor was among the first recipients of the N-Peace Award from UNDP for her efforts work in promoting peace between Sri Lanka's different ethnic groups in 2011. A short film about Saroor and this accolade was made by Sri Lankan journalist Sulochana Peiris. Also in 2011, Saroor received the Bremen Peace Award in the category of Public Engagement.

In 2017, Saroor received the Franco-German Prize for Human Rights and the Rule of Law. In the same year, she became an Ashoka Fellow.

== Publications ==
Saroor has edited the release of two books and has written several journal articles.

=== Books ===
- Saroor, Shreen Abdul, ed. (2021). Muslims in Post-War Sri Lanka: Repression, Resistance & Reform. Colombo: Alliance for Minorities. ISBN 9786249836105.
- Saroor, Shreen Abdul, ed. (2014). Our Struggles, our stories. ISBN 9789554142701.

=== Journal articles ===
- Emmanuel, Sarala; Saroor, Shreen (2022). "Experiences of Gendered Norms and Mobilizing for Rights of Women Living With Disabilities in the Post-war Context in Sri Lanka". Frontiers in Sociology. 7–2022 715240. doi:10.3389/fsoc.2022.715240. ISSN 2297-7775. PMC 9062655. PMID 35516816.
- Saroor, Shreen (2010). "Impact of tsunami in the East – Muslim women's perspective". South Asian Popular Culture. 8 (1): 57–71. doi:10.1080/14746681003633259.
- Saroor, Shreen (2003). "Advocating for the Voting Rights of Sri Lankan Migrant Workers". Asian and Pacific Migration Journal. 12 (1–2): 209–216. doi:10.1177/011719680301200109. eISSN 2057-049X. ISSN 0117-1968.
