= Jagath Chamila =

Sri Lankan actor

- Born: Jagath Chamila Fernando; June 6, 1972 (age 54); Sri Lanka
- Education: Prince of Wales' College, Moratuwa
- Occupations: Actor, dramatist
- Years active: 1992–present
- Spouse: Piyumi Uthpala Dharmasri
- Children: Venuri Kinara; Pansilu Pavan
- Parents: Tinil Fernando (father); Veenal Biatrice (mother)
- Awards: Best Actor award - New York International Film festival (2013); Best Actor award in Boden International Film Festival (Sweden) 2021

Jagath Chamila Fernando (Sinhala: ජගත් චමිල, born 6 June 1972) is an actor in Sri Lankan cinema, theatre and television. He made his film debut in 1992 in the Sinhalese film Guru Gedara, portraying a child. In 2013, he won the award for the Best Actor at New York International Film festival for his portrayal of Sami in Samige Kathava, a film based on Elmo Jayawardena's novel Sam's Story (2001). He is considered one of five actors who have dominated the Sri Lankan stage by critics.

== Family ==
Jagath Chamila was born on 6 June 1972. His father, Tinil Fernando, was a school principal and his mother, Veenal Biatrice, is a housewife. He has two brothers, Ajith Tinil and Prasad Saman, and one sister, Nirosha Shayamali. Chamila is married to Piyumi Uthpala Dharmasri and they have one son, Pansilu Pavan, and one daughter, Venuri Kinara. Piyumi is the daughter of the Director Vijaya Dharmasri.

== Career ==
Chamila's career as an actor started with stage dramas at school while he was a student at Prince of Wales' College, Moratuwa. After taking part in the school drama Samanala Kanda in 1986, he able to win the Best Actor awards in the inter-school drama competition from 1990 to 1992. He made his first film appearance in 1992 in Gurugedara (Teacher's Home), directed by Vijaya Dharmasiri. He won the Best Actor award for his role in Sunil Chandrasiri's play Don Juan at the State Drama Festival in 2005. In 2013, he won the best actor's award for his leading role in Sameege Kathawa (Sam's Story) at the New York City International Film festival in New York.

=== Television serials ===
- Api Ape
- Api Api Wage I and II
- Aswenna
- Avul Haraya
- Bus Eke Iskole
- Girikula
- Govi Thaththa
- Helankada
- Jayathuru Sankaya
- Jeewithaya Lassanai
- Jodu Gedara
- Kota Uda Mandira
- Maha Polowa
- Maama Haa Ma
- Mama Nemei Mama
- Manikkawatha
- Mawa Mathakada
- Miringu Sayura
- Nagenahira Weralin Asena
- No Parking
- Paradeesaya
- Pawani
- Roda Hatara Manamalaya
- Ron Soya
- Ruwan Maliga
- Sakura Mal
- Samanalakanda
- Sandagira
- Sada Pinibidaka
- Sihina Genena Kumariye
- Sudui Usai
- Swayanjatha
- Tharu Kumari
- Theth Saha Viyali
- The Lake
- Udu Sulanga
- Verona
- Visuviyas Kandu Pamula
- Yasa Isuru
- Pirinivan Kandu Pamula

== Filmography ==
Key
†	Denotes films that have not yet been released

Year	Film	Role	Notes
1992	Gurugedara		
1995	Maruthaya		
2000	Me Mage Sandai	Prospective soldier	
2002	Thani Thatuwen Piyabanna	Football player	
2005	Asani Warsha	Pradeep Godakumbura	
2005	Sulanga	Threewheel driver	
2007	Uppalawanna	Rathnapala	
2008	Hathara Denama Surayo remake	Dougie	
2011	Gamani	Sunimal	
2012	Prathiroo	Suresh	
2013	Samige Kathawa	Sam	Best Actor - New York City International Film festival (2013); Creative Performance (Male) Gold award - SIGNIS Salutation Awards Ceremony
2015	Ho Gaana Pokuna	Madhuwantha	Only the voice
2017	Hima Tharaka		
2022	Hithumathe Jeewithe	Wimale	
2023	Thattu Deke Iskole	Uncle Pala	
2023	Kadira Divyaraja		
2023	Ape Principal		
2024	Weerya	Aloka	
2024	Passport	Amare	
2024	Sri Siddha		

== Awards ==
- Best Actor Award in the inter-school drama competition - 1988, 1989, 1990
- State Drama Award (Best Actor) for Don Juan - 2005
- President award (Best supporting actor) for Asani Warsha - 2005
- Raigam tele award (Best supporting actor) for Roda Hathare Manamalaya - 2005
- SIGNIS Tele Cinema Award (Best supporting actor) for Roda Hathare Manamalaya - 2005
- Sarasaviya Award (Special Jury Award) for Asani Warsha - 2005
- Sumathi Awards (Best Actor) for Swayanjatha - 2011
- New York City International Film Festival (Best actor in a Leading role) for Sam’s Story - 2013
- Boden International Film Festival (Sweden) - Best Actor for Govi Thaththa- 2021
