= Swasthika Arulingam =

Sri Lankan human rights lawyer and activist

- Occupations: Human rights lawyer; women's rights activist

Swasthika Arulingam is a Sri Lankan human rights lawyer, women's rights activist, human rights activist and political activist. She also serves as a prominent member of the Labour Movement.

== Career ==
Arulingam has specialized in the field of law as an attorney-at-law. She has advocated for the rights of women and girls in public forums and public spheres, often highlighting women who are vulnerable to gender based violence.

She served as a project manager at the legal aid commission for the North and East program Support Unit. She has been a vocal critic of the Rajapaksa regime and has requested justice for Tamil victims affected by the final stages of Sri Lankan Civil War.

Her Facebook exchange with Tamil National Alliance politician MA Sumanthiran regarding to the Counterterrorism Bill was compiled as an article in the Colombo Telegraph in 2018.

On 9 June 2020, she was detained by Sri Lankan police as she tried to enquire about the arrests of Black Lives Matter protestors in Colombo. She was released the following day after being detained for several hours.

On 13 July 2021, she became the first female member to participate in the National Labour Advisory Council meeting after being nominated by the United Federation of Labour. She was appointed as the Deputy Secretary General of the Commercial and Industrial Workers Union.

Arulingam has been involved with the Aragalaya movement since its inception in March 2022 as its voluntary representative, and she has advocated for the rights of peaceful protestors. She was also in the forefront as a protest organiser at Galle Face Green and had advocated as a social activist on behalf of people's struggle.
