= Elmo Jayawardena =

Sri Lankan aviator, writer, novelist and philanthropist

- Born: Moratuwa
- Education: St. Sebastian's College, Moratuwa
- Occupations: pilot, philanthropist, writer, novelist, storyteller and author
- Known for: Sam's Story
- Spouse: Dili Jayawardena
- Awards: Gratiaen Prize (2001)

Elmo Jayawardena is a Sri Lankan pilot, philanthropist, writer, novelist, storyteller and author. He is the founder and President of AFLAC (The Association For Lighting A Candle) International, a humanitarian organization that actively works towards alleviating poverty. He won the Gratiaen Prize for his novel Sam's Story (2001).

== Biography ==
He was born into a rich family, and his father served as an RAF fighter pilot who also went on to become the senior captain at Air Ceylon. However, his father unexpectedly lost his job when Elmo was only 12 years old, and his family faced economic hardships. He became the breadwinner of the family by the age of 14 and he endured an impoverished childhood. He attended St. Sebastian's College, Moratuwa, for his primary education, and he also reportedly went to school without wearing a pair of shoes and instead wore slippers due to his inability to afford even a pair of shoes. He lived most of his life in Moratuwa, where he was born and raised.

== Career ==
He worked as an accounts clerk for a brief stint at Carson Cumberbatch. His life took a turning point when one of his colleagues at Carson Cumberbatch recommended him for a job at Air Ceylon by showing him a newspaper advertisement. The newspaper advertisement was calling out applications for stewards, and Elmo applied for the job and was eventually selected among the shortlisted candidates to join Air Ceylon. He flew aeroplanes for Air Ceylon and then served as a pilot with Singapore Airlines on jumbo jets for two decades. He also joined SriLankan Airlines where he trained pilots in the simulator.

His novel Sam's Story received praise and critical acclaim, for which it received the Gratiaen Prize in 2001. In 2014, a Sinhala film titled Samige Kathawa was released and the plot of the film was based on Sam's Story. He published a historical novel, The Last Kingdom of Sinhalay, based on the Kingdom of Kandy (known as the Kandyan era) which was also the last kingdom of Sri Lanka before the full-scale invasion by the British. The Last Kingdom of Sinhalay won the State Literary Award in 2005 after being adjudged as the best book during that year. His book Rainbows in Braille was shortlisted in the English category for the Singapore Literature Prize in 2008. In 2012, he published a book titled, A Centenary Sky: 100 Years of Aviation in Sri Lanka in collaboration with the Civil Aviation Authority of Sri Lanka and it was published as a tribute to the 100th anniversary of the aviation industry in Sri Lanka (1912-2012). He published a book titled, Kakiyanː The Story of a Crow in October 2018 and was based on the story of a young crow who grows up with his family and neighbours in the Jacaranda Condominium.

It is revealed that Elmo had instructed that all the proceeds received from the sale of his books should be channeled towards the vulnerable communities that are affected by poverty. He has also published articles in mainstream media for Colombo Telegraph, The Island, Sunday Observer and Daily News covering various topics such as nationalism and literature. He coined the idea of having a press to focus on publishing contemporary Sri Lankan poetry, which eventually gave rise to Annasi & Kadalagotu, a small-press publishing house based in Colombo.

His humanitarian work was recognized globally, and he was featured in Forbes Global in 1999. In 2001, he was honored by Reader's Digest magazine as an 'Everyday Hero'.

== See also ==
List of Sri Lankan aviators
