= Ambika Satkunanathan =

Sri Lankan human rights lawyer and activist

Commissioner of the Human Rights Commission of Sri Lanka
- In office 2015–2020

Personal details
- Education: Monash University, University of Nottingham

Ambika Satkunanathan is a human rights lawyer and human rights activist. She is also the former Commissioner of the Human Rights Commission of Sri Lanka. She also served in as the legal Consultant to the UN Office of the High Commissioner for Human Rights in Sri Lanka. She is the Chairperson of the Neelan Tiruchelvam Trust.

She has been a vocal critic of Prevention of Terrorism Act and has been also a vocal critic of the Sri Lankan authorities especially regarding the treatment of Tamils in Northern and Eastern provinces. She has also advocated for #MeToo movement in Sri Lanka. She has also been a strong vocal critic of the Rajapaksa family. She is also critical of the Sri Lankan political culture calling it misogynist in reference to the lack of women representation in Sri Lankan politics. She has also often stressed the importance of legal institutions working in an independent manner free from political interference.

== Career ==
She obtained her BA and LLB from Monash University in Australia and Master of Human Rights Law LLM from the University of Nottingham. She was a Chevening Scholar. She is currently researching the impact of drug policies on prison overcrowding in Southeast Asia for the UN Office of the High Commission for Human Rights. Her research, advocacy and activism have been largely focused on key areas such as custodial violence, transitional justice, penal policy and prison reform, militarization, gender and Tamil nationalism. She is a fellow at the Open Society Foundations.

She served as the Commissioner of the Human Rights Commission of Sri Lanka from 2015 to 2020 over the period of five years. She was appointed as the Human Rights Commissioner in October 2015. She resigned from the position in HRC on 7 March 2020 after tendering her resignation to president Gotabaya Rajapaksa on 26 February 2020. During her tenure as the She was the Commissioner of the Human Rights Commission, she conceptualized and led the first ever national study of prisons in Sri Lanka. Under her guidance, Human Rights Commission conducted the first national study of prisoners from February 2018 to January 2020 in order to identify and analyze the issues faced by prisoners who have been in prisons. She also served as the legal Consultant to the UN Office of the High Commissioner for Human Rights in Sri Lanka from February 1998 to March 2014, prior to her appointment as the Commissioner of the Human Rights Commission.

She also serves as one of the members of the Expert Panel of the Trivial Watch Project of the Clooney Foundation. She is also the Vice Chairperson of Urgent Action Fund Asia & Pacific. She also serves as an advisory board member of the Suriya Women's Development Centre in Batticaloa. She has also served as a national legal advisor to the Office of the Senior Human Rights Advisor and also as a national consultant on gender integration/evaluation at the Office of the Residence Coordinator. She was initially enlisted as a national list candidate of Tamil National Alliance for the 2020 Sri Lankan parliamentary election but the plans were dropped after baseless allegations were made against her in social media by targeted groups.

In December 2021, she addressed the United States House of Representatives Tom Lantos Commission on Human Rights on the subject titled 'Accountability and Human Rights in Sri Lanka' where she highlighted the failure of successive governments in Sri Lanka on holding accountability for human rights violations. She also pointed out the influence of Sinhala Buddhist nationalism and militarization over the takeover of lands in North and East parts of Sri Lanka which belongs to Tamilians. In January 2022, however the foreign ministry in Sri Lanka slammed Ambika's remarks and sentiments over the current situation of human rights and labour rights in Sri Lanka. She was alleged by foreign ministry for having hidden agendas by spreading false information and accused her of being part of LTTE propaganda. However, Ambika hit back at the foreign ministry's statements calling it as derogatory and condemned the continuous negligence and ignorance of the authorities regarding the human rights in Sri Lanka.

She criticized the contrasting approach of the officials towards the protestors in North and East comparing to that of South (who were protesting as part of 2022 Sri Lankan protests) and calling it double standards owing to language and racial discrimination. She appeared in the 2023 documentary film #GoHomeGota by Sri Lankan journalist Sulochana Peiris.

== Publications ==
- Satgunanathan, Ambika (2015). "The Executive and the Shadow State in Sri Lanka" (PDF). Sri Lankan Presidentialism 35 Years on: Provenance, Problems, Prospects, Centre for Policy Alternatives, Colombo: 371–398.
- Satgunanathan, Ambika (23 February 2017). "Collaboration, suspicion and traitors: an exploratory study of intra-community relations in post-war Northern Sri Lanka". Contemporary South Asia. 24 (4): 416–428. doi:10.1080/09584935.2016.1252315. S2CID 152025400.
- Satgunanathan, Ambika (February 2018). Ní Aoláin, Fionnuala; Cahn, Naomi; Haynes, Dina Francesca; Valji, Nahla (eds.). Sri Lanka: The Impact of Militarization on Women. The Oxford Handbook of Gender and Conflict. doi:10.1093/oxfordhb/9780199300983.013.46. ISBN 978-0-19-930098-3.
- Reintegration and Rehabilitation of Former Combatants in Post-war Sri Lanka. Routledge Handbooks Online. December 2018. doi:10.4324/9781315720180-13. ISBN 9781138855700. S2CID 187209216.
- Satkunanathan, Ambika (19 March 2013). "Militarisation as panacea: development and reconciliation in post-war Sri Lanka". Open Democracy.
- Satkunanathan, Ambika (28 March 2021). "Surviving War and Victimhood: Women and Tamil Nationalism". The Wire.
- Satkunanathan, Ambika (17 March 2021). "How Democratic Institutions Are Undermined: Notes From Sri Lanka". The Wire.
