= Samige Kathawa =

- Sinhala: සැමීගේ කතාව
- Directed by: Priyankara Vittanachchi
- Written by: Priyankara Vittanachchi; Puspa Kumara Ellawala
- Based on: Novel by Elmo Jayawardena
- Produced by: Maheel Films
- Starring: Jagath Chamila; Sanath Gunathilake; Menik Kurukulasuriya
- Cinematography: Ruwan Costa
- Edited by: Shyaman Premasundara
- Music by: Lakshman Joseph De Saram
- Production company: Dil Films International
- Distributed by: CEL Circuit
- Release date: 28 February 2014 (Sri Lanka)
- Running time: 94 minutes
- Country: Sri Lanka
- Language: Sinhala

Samige Kathawa (Sinhala: සැමීගේ කතාව, lit. 'Sam's story') is a 2014 Sri Lankan Sinhala drama film directed by Priyankara Vittanachchi and co-produced by Priyankara Vittanachchi, Wimal Deshapriya, Rohan Fonseka for Maheel Films. It stars Jagath Chamila in lead role along with Sanath Gunathilake, Nilmini Buwaneka and Menik Kurukulasuriya. Music composed by Lakshman Joseph De Saram. It is the 1202nd film in the Sri Lankan cinema. The film has based on the Gratiaen Prize winning novel Sam's Story of Captain Elmo Jayawardena.

== Cast ==
- Jagath Chamila as Sam
- Sanath Gunathilake
- Menik Kurukulasuriya
- Kusum Perera
- Nilmini Buwaneka as Sam's mother
- Victor Ramanayake
- Vathika Ravinath
- Thesara Jayawardane as Captain Elmo's daughter

== Awards ==
The film had many positive reviews from local and international critics and award ceremonies.

- The Best Actor award at New York City International Film Festival 2013 = Jagath Chamila.
- Special Jury Award at Fourth SAARC Film Festival.
