= Reconciliation studies =

Since about the 2010s, reconciliation studies has been a new scientific approach in the field of peace and conflict studies. It has commonalities with peacebuilding, conflict transformation, and transitional justice research, and to a lesser extent with academic work on peace psychology, conflict resolution, conflict management, mediation, security studies, memory studies, and trauma and resilience studies.

== Definition ==
Reconciliation is generally viewed as a process, outcome, or goal for improving relationships. More specifically, it is a process of creating "normal" and if possible "good" relationships between the parties in response to grave incidents such as wars, civil conflicts, genocides, atrocities, forced displacement, enslavement, dictatorship, oppression, colonialism, Apartheid, and other human rights violations and injustices. In these situations of massive violations of human rights, reconciliation means creating a time and place to address past suffering, integrate, embrace, and share a common future. It is a process of improving relations between and within groups, recognition of social identities and power dynamics, addressing trauma and reckoning with the past. Reconciliation mainly focuses on building or rebuilding relationships and dealing with the past, present and future and is an essential part of Peacebuilding by addressing the root causes of conflict and improving intergroup relations. The definition of reconciliation encompasses a variety of perspectives, open to wide applications and sometimes overlapping interpretations, depending on the actor employing the term.

Reconciliation is a critical part of the peacebuilding process and is intertwined with achieving justice, reducing violence, and conflict transformation. Discussions are still ongoing whether reconciliation is a process, an outcome, an ideal and perhaps utopian goal, or a specific stage or moment in the process of overcoming violent conflict. However, there is a certain tendency to see reconciliation as an overarching concept for the long-term process to create better relationships after violence. Many scholars and practitioners also stress the importance of reconciliation efforts for the cessation of violence in the middle of conflict. Reconciliation researcher Martin Leiner defines reconciliation studies as the "scholarly description, interpretation and evaluation of processes to develop 'normal' and if possible 'good' relationships between states, groups, organizations, and individuals reacting against past, present or preventing future grave incidents such as Wars, Civil Wars, Genocides, Atrocities, Forced Displacement, Enslavement, Dictatorship, Oppression, Colonialism, Apartheid, and other Human Rights Violations and injustices, and creating a scientific discourse of developing a common future to enable the transformation of conflicts towards the path of peace." Stressing the main goal of reconciliation as improved intergroup relations and the building or rebuilding of trust, Professor Karina V. Korostelina defines reconciliation as "a process of management of social identities and reckoning with the past. Reconciliation processes depend on interrelations among conflict, power, social identity, and collective memory/ narratives about history."

According to the Stanford Dictionary of Philosophy, political reconciliation includes the following practices: "Apologies, Memorials, Truth Telling, Amnesties, Trials and Punishment, Lustration, Reparations, Forgiveness and Participation in Deliberative Processes" Reconciliation is also viewed as a process of building long-term peace between former enemies through bilateral initiatives and institutions across governments and societies. Other scholars would add at least trauma therapies, encounter programs, and the construction of a common human security structure in order to achieve no repetition.

Within this field, reconciliation studies are characterized by four guiding assumptions:

- Relationship. Reconciliation studies are focusing on the question of how trustful and cooperative relationships can be (re)built in the face of grave incidents of violence. This implies a closeness of reconciliation studies to philosophical and scientific anthropologies of humans as relational animals (Hegel 1807, Buber 1923, Rosa 2012, Fuchs 2007, du Toit 2017). This focus on relationships has also practical consequences. For many reconciliation scholars, their field also includes the study of the distortions of relationships before grave incidents are happening. The social construction of enemies, pathologies of communication connected with imaginaries of the other (Kearney 2003), frames for war, missed reconciliation in the initial moments of conflict, certain long-term structural realities of discrimination such as Apartheid, racism, islamophobia, antisemitism, antiziganism, ableism, xenophobia, classism, patriarchate, colonialism, slavery, and different cultural habits of dehumanization and exploitation often indicate needs and possibilities for reconciliation in order to create better relationships before violent incidents occur.
- Intergroup and Identity Dynamics. Reconciliation not only creates a foundation for peaceful coexistence but also promotes cooperation between conflicting parties based on the management of social identities and addressing a contentious past. It requires reduction of intergroup threat, relative deprivation, and addressing trauma. It also involves the dissolution of rigid social boundaries and the formation of common and cross-cutting identities; these identities then act as a foundation for stable and peaceful coexistence building on the respect and trust between former enemies. Thus, reconciliation processes are deeply rooted in interconnections between conflict, power, social identity, and collective memory.
- Inclusiveness. Reconciliation studies often assume that all parties involved in a distortion of a relationship must be integrated into the process of reconciliation and that multiple kinds of processes of reconciliation (such as reconciliation with oneself, with the own group and with others) are intertwined and are happening simultaneously. Reconciliation studies try to overcome limited concepts of reconciliation such as working only on individual I-Thou-relationships between persons or only working in so called "post-conflict settings".
- Transdisciplinary. The factors why reconciliation succeeds or fails are so multiple and complex that transdisciplinary research including a wide range of disciplines is required.
- Scientific ambition. An important group of reconciliation scholars, the group that founded the International Association for Reconciliation Studies (IARS), aims at the goal of lifting reconciliation studies from the self-reflection of practitioners to a high-level scientific field.

== Historical background ==
=== History of reconciliation ===
Practices of reconciliation are indispensable for the survival of human communities, because without restoration of relationships after grave incidents - which always happen - community is put into question. These practices can be traced back to animal behavior and have been documented in every so far described human society. They are most salient in intimate relationships, inter- and intragroup relationships, religion and ethics, but also touch other fields of life.

=== History of the notion of reconciliation ===
The history of the notion of reconciliation and its translations into other languages is still to be written. It can be found in ancient Greek comedy (Aristophanes, Lysistrata, performed 411 BC) with reference to peacemaking in the war between Athens and Sparta, in Apostle Paul's writings (2. Cor 5, 11-21), in legal and economic contexts such as accounting, as a key idea in the philosophy of G.W.F. Hegel (cf. Rosza 2005) In the 20th century, reconciliation became an often used - and misused - political term. Between others it was misused to legitimize the collaboration with the Nazi occupation in France and to legitimize amnesties for former dictators, but it was also used in a better way as guiding notion for several peace-making initiatives (cf. the NGOs: International Fellowship of Reconciliation, Action Reconciliation Service for Peace), for West Germany's policy of reconciliation after World War II and for the reconciliation processes which took place since the 1990s in South Africa, Rwanda, Northern Ireland and other countries.

=== History of Scientific Studies about reconciliation ===
From the 1990s on, academic interest in reconciliation started to get traction. From the point of view of many different disciplines and from the experience of practitioners, important studies of reconciliation processes have been presented. The first push for reconciliation as a research topic came from practical work in the field.

Based on his experience of the war in former Yugoslavia, theologian and later professor at Yale, Miroslav Volf published in 1996 Exclusion and Embrace: A Theological Exploration of Identity, Otherness, and Reconciliation.

A year later, the German-Canadian scholar Gregory Baum together with Harold Wells edited the first edition of his book The Reconciliation of People: Challenge to the Churches (1997) promoting the study of reconciliation in both Catholic theology and the WCC. Scholar-practitioner John Paul Lederach published a book in 1998 entitled: Building Peace: Sustainable Reconciliation in Divided Societies and The Journey Towards Reconciliation in 1999. With both books, Lederach was probably the first often read author who focused on reconciliation.

At the same time, scientific studies from different disciplines such as theology, sociology, rhetorics, religious studies, law and psychology came out on the procedures and the contexts of South Africa's Truth and Reconciliation Commission. Most importantly, as an outcome of the Truth and Reconciliation Commission the first research institute on reconciliation was established in Cape Town in 2000: the Institute for Justice and Reconciliation.

Almost in parallel with the research born out of the relative success of the South African reconciliation process, in Israel, out of the desire to reconcile Israelis and Palestinians and of the difficulties in implementing the Oslo Accords, another important research in reconciliation started. It was mainly carried out by social psychologists. In Beer-Sheba, a more social-action related research line has been built by Daniel Bar-On and his successor Shifra Sagy). In Tel-Aviv and Herzliya, Daniel Bar-Tal, Arie Nadler and younger scholars such as Eran Halperin developed basic theories which opened the way to reconciliation studies. The volume From Conflict Resolution to Reconciliation (2004) with mainly Israeli and American authors marks a breakthrough of studies on reconciliation, even if the main argument of Bar-Tal in favor of reconciliation is pronounced more clearly nine years later in his book published Intractable Conflicts. Socio-Psychological Foundation and Dynamics (2013). The main argument is: Many conflicts are intractable. Intractable conflicts have a socio-emotional infrastructure which makes traditional Conflict Resolution through diplomacy and treaties fail because too many strong actors in the society or even entire populations are too much into strong emotions of hatred, mistrust and willingness to impose one's own vision that only a change made by reconciliation can make an intractable conflict tractable. As the Israeli-Palestinian-Conflict or Cyprus Conflict are intractable conflicts, there will be no peace without reconciliation. Arie Nadler from Tel Aviv University co-edited in 2008 the book The Social Psychology of Intergroup Reconciliation. He is as well the creator of a needs-based model of reconciliation, explaining why reconciliation is successful: it is fulfilling the needs of those in the victim position (acknowledgment, agency, apologies, justice, reparation, ...) as well as the needs of the perpetrators (to be part of moral community again and to have a second chance,...).

Around the year 2000, in the US several studies were published on the role of religions in conflict and in reconciliation. In his famous book The Ambivalence of the Sacred, Notre Dame University historian R. Scott Appleby, published a chapter titled "Reconciliation and the Politics of Forgiveness" (2000, pp. 167–206). In a similar way, Marc Gopin from the Carter School for Peace and Conflict Resolution developed religious reconciliation in his book Holy War, Holy Peace (2002, p. 195-197). Together with South Africa and Israel, the US became one of the countries where reconciliation was most studied. Notre Dame based political scientist Daniel Philpott (2006) described the way to reconciliation integrating reconciliation in a liberal-democratic peacemaking framework. Already before, in 2003, a group of authors around the editors David Bloomfield, Teresa Barnes and Luc Huyse had published a more praxis-oriented Handbook Reconciliation after Violent Conflicts. Ireland, the UK and the US were leading in the development of MA-programs on reconciliation. Based on the experiences of reconciliation in Northern Ireland, a first MA study program on conflict resolution and reconciliation was founded in Belfast and Dublin/Trinity College and with different thematic focus at the University of Maine in the US and from the Carter School for Peace and Conflict Resolution. At Winchester University, starting in 2010 the Center for Religion, Reconciliation, and Peace has been founded. In cooperation with the St. Ethelburga's Center for Reconciliation and Peace a MA program called Reconciliation and Peacebuilding was established with the aim of bringing together scientific rigor and practical experience. Constantly growing, the Winchester University program has become a leading academic institution for the formation of practitioners in reconciliation in Europe.

=== History of Scientific Studies about reconciliation ===
The history of reconciliation studies as an academic project on its own must be distinguished from research and M.A. programs on reconciliation. Reconciliation studies started with the programmatic text by Susan Flämig/Martin Leiner "Reconciliation in the Middle of Dispute". Both have developed the following principles: 1. Reconciliation has to be studied globally- comparative and 2. in a transdisciplinary way, 3. The symbolic meaning of actions, the multi-perspectivity actors in conflicts and different scientific disciplines are taking and the role of the Media require a special hermeneutics of conflict. 4. They suggested to work on a new theory of conflict under the Hölderlin-perspective stating the reconciliation is in the middle of the conflict. When in 2013 the Jena Center for Reconciliation Studies (JCRS) was founded at Friedrich-Schiller-University in Jena, the goal was to focus exclusively on reconciliation processes, to research all kinds of reconciliation processes worldwide and to unite scholars from many disciplines to work together in order to understand reconciliation processes in their complexity. A common research project was conducted in cooperation with Arie Nadler, Shifra Sagy from Israel and Mohammed Dajani from Wasatia NGO in the Palestinian territories. The results of this project, which can be considered to be the first larger research project in transdisciplinary reconciliation studies have been published in the book Encountering the Suffering of the Other: Reconciliation Studies amid the Israeli-Palestinian Conflict. In 2014 the European Center for Reconciliation Research (ECRR) has been founded at JCRS in Jena. The founding members were Prof. Martin Leiner (FSU, Jena), Prof. Dr. Karina Korostelina (GMU, Arlington), Prof. Dr. Lily Gardner Feldman (Johns Hopkins University, Washington DC), Prof. Dr. Corinne Defrance (Sorbonne, Paris), Dr. Vladimir Handl (Charles University, Prag) and Werner Hein (Washington DC).

The JCRS was also the place where the first doctoral program focusing exclusively on reconciliation studies was founded in 2016 under the name "Religion, Conflict, Reconciliation". In 2018, the Academic Alliance for Reconciliation Studies in the Middle East and North Africa (AARMENA) has been established in Jena supporting common research projects and teaching of reconciliation in that region. So far AARMENA supported the accreditation of two MA studies on reconciliation in Jordan, one in the Westbank and one in Gaza. In 2020, the International Association for Reconciliation Studies (IARS) has been founded in Jena.

With the time, other research centers for reconciliation studies have been founded. Like JCRS they are considering reconciliation studies as a scientific study of its own. Three of them are of special importance:

  - Bonner Zentrum für Versöhnungsforschung/Center for Reconciliation Studies“ at Bonn University/Germany. At this center the first Professor for Reconciliation Studies has been appointed in 2024. It is the sociologist Rosario Figary-Layus.
  - Institute of International Reconciliation Studies at Waseda University /Tokyo led by Professor Toyomi Asano and undertaking the largest research project on reconciliation studies so far.
  - Mary Hoch Center for Reconciliation at the Carter School for Peace and Conflict Resolution, founded in 2019 and led by research professor Antti Pentikäinen which is developing new concepts for reconciliation work such as the "insider reconcilers".

The dynamics of reconciliation studies as an academic field is shown by the publication of handbooks on reconciliation (for example, from the point of view of peace-psychology: Malley-Morrison 2013) and meta-studies such as the development of an ideal typology of four types of reconciliation theories by Fanie du Toit (2018). On the basis of the meanwhile important quantity of studies on reconciliation, he distinguishes four Weberian ideal types: 1. Forgiving embrace, 2. Liberal peace 3. Antagonistic reconciliation and 4. Reconciliation as interdependence.

Reconciliation studies also become an important part of the theories and practice of achieving sustainable peace. Professor Karina V. Korostelina defines a sustainable peace process as "a transformative process of mutual recognition of the complexities of identity dynamics and their functions in achieving peace and justice in post-conflict societies. This approach concentrates on local agency and promotion of diverse voices in defining peace processes and leading societal transformation in societies affected by asymmetric and protracted conflicts." The importance of intergroup reconciliation for sustainable peace is stressed in the strategic peacebuilding approach that defines just peace as involving diverse actors and activities across all sectors of society and in intersubjective approach that acknowledges the diversity of views on just peace, stressing the importance of considering all perspectives in shaping a shared peace framework. These approaches reject a universal notion of just peace, highlighting both the differences between conflicts and the varied understandings of justice held by different parties, with an emphasis on reconciliation, respect and recognition of their identities.

== Type and degree of reconciliation ==
Reconciliation is about building or rebuilding relationships and always involves the question of who to reconcile with. The target may be an individual, an interpersonal relationship, an institution, or social, political, ethnic, religious, or other groups. It could also reach into deeper areas, not just reconciliation between conflicting entities. From this perspective, reconciliation can be classified into five dimensions: 1) With oneself, 2) With the other(s), 3) With the own group, 4) With the environment, 5) With transcendence. Reconciliation also goes beyond the personal encounter between victims and perpetrators; it also involves changing structural violence such as poverty, discrimination, and exclusion, and promoting mutual respect based on justice to heal deep-rooted hatred and hostility toward each other. Reconciliation is a long-term process that creates a culture of sustainable peace.

There is a description of the degree of (or level of) reconciliation. This is sometimes measured on a normative scale of reconciliation, such as “minimalist” to “maximalist” or “thin” to “thick”. Thin-level reconciliation is a basic agreement for minimal coexistence between former enemies which is "simple coexistence". It excludes or minimizes recognition of the past and responsibility and focuses on the needs of the present. It is an important first step toward full reconciliation in that it can lead to a ceasefire and start a formal dialogue. In contrast, the maximal and thick reconciliation approach would require individual as well as social transformation, encompassing acknowledgment of past wrongdoings, mutual acceptance, a shared future and even forgiveness. It is a more victim-centered approach aimed at respect and healing for the victims. Some scholars also categorize reconciliation into non-reconciliation, shallow reconciliation and deep reconciliation based on the consensus of narratives, in which case the key factor in categorizing the degree is the history of both sides and the confrontation of historical narratives.

The goal of reconciliation is a journey that starts at a minimal level and progresses to a maximal reconciliation through successive phases.

== Process of reconciliation ==
There is no standardized reconciliation process of universal application. Interdisciplinary scholars are researching how reconciliation is structured and what procedures are desirable, based on historical and empirical records. For example, Fanie du Toit (2018), former Executive Director at the Institute for Justice and Reconciliation proposed a theoretical approach to reconciliation-as-interdependence to initiate reconciliation in ongoing conflicts based on a case in South Africa. He emphasizes the restoration of just relations while reminding that reconciliation is the only alternative for the long-term well-being of one's own community and the hostile group. In terms of the reconciliation process, most would agree with the following description.

The reconciliation process
The process of reconciliation is not:	The process of reconciliation is:
an excuse for impunity; only an individual process; in opposition to/an alternative to truth or justice; a quick answer; a religious concept; perfect peace; an excuse to forget; a matter of merely forgiving	agreeing on a narrative about the past wrongdoings as a common ground to move forward on; identifying the victim and the perpetrator respectively as well as the wrongdoing; a process of acknowledging, remembering, and learning from the past in order to prevent their repetition in the future; focus on the wrongdoing and its condemnation while allowing the rehabilitation of the perpetrator for future peaceful coexistence; the (re)building of relationships; coming to terms with past acts and enemies; address the issue of justice in restoring the breached norms and rules and the equality of all before the law; a profound feeling of administrating justice (any of or the combination of retributive, restorative, or transitional justice); restoring the victim's status (wrongly accused) while recognizing the wrongdoing of the responsible party; offering any sort of reparation (in form of acknowledgement, justice, financial or even symbolic); a society-wide, long-term process of deep change; voluntary and cannot be imposed

Reconciliation does not mean that victims should forget the series of past violence and move on for the common good. On the contrary, it is argued that for the prevention of its repetition, it is necessary to remember and, if feasible, forgive. Thus, it rather involves justice, historical awareness of what the victims have experienced, reparation, psychological healing, punishment of the perpetrators and moral rectitude and many other practices. This requires a multi-dimensional approach which would promote the opportunity, space, actions, expertise and will for both victims and perpetrators to recover. Addressing complexities of social identity and power in intergroup relations, reconciliation processes redefine social boundaries, reduce intergroup threat and relative deprivation, address traumas and historical injustices, and create inclusive and balanced collective axiology. Reconciliation is also not something that happens entirely after the conflict or violence is over.

== Reconciliation in practice ==
Practical examples of facilitating reconciliation include politically documented acts such as treaties, conventions, or legal provisions; symbolic acts such as apologies from heads of state; formal reparations; or the establishment of memorials or monuments. Also, various research institutes, civil society organizations, and related organizations are running programs to promote reconciliation. The Truth and Reconciliation Commission (TRC) is a well-known and the most common domestic organization which is tasked with reconciliation. Conflict Mediation, Trauma healing, Community Dialogue are representative programs being carried out by civil society.

Many studies have also suggested that gender considerations significantly enhance the effectiveness of reconciliation processes. Based on these findings, there is a growing number of programs that include female voices in testimony and records, engage female representatives in dialogue, and provide training for them.

== Controversies in the field ==
Actual controversies in reconciliation studies concern between others the definition of reconciliation (see above), the measurement of reconciliation, the relationship to neighboring approaches such as Transitional Justice-Research and Conflict Resolution, and the evaluation of the classic cases of reconciliation.

For quantitative measurement of reconciliation, scholars have proposed indirect measurement through behavior (such as frequency of cooperation with the other, symbolic gestures of reconciliation and their acceptance in the population, or comments, reactions and interactions on Social Media), and direct measurements through self-assessment on the quality of relationships and on attitudes towards the other.

Concerning the relationship between transitional justice research and reconciliation studies is determined by the view scholars have on transitional justice and reconciliation. We can distinguish (A.) models of competition underlining that there should be an either-or or a priority in time and importance between justice-oriented activities and reconciliation and (B.) models which see transitional justice as a necessary and to a certain extent independent part of overarching reconciliation policies.

Since the works on intractable conflicts (see Bar-Tal and Mitchell above) the relation between conflict resolution and reconciliation is often seen in a way which understands reconciliation as the overarching process and conflict resolution as part of that process. However, the place of conflict resolution within that concept needs further development.

== Classical cases ==
=== Germany since WWII and Holocaust ===
After losing WWII and being responsible for the Holocaust, the Federal Republic of Germany as the legal successor of the German Empire was confronted with an almost total breakdown of its moral reputation. From the 1950s on, German State representatives and important parts of the civil society adopted the approach of reconciliation in order to become trusted members of the international community again. Therefore, reconciliation processes with countries such as Israel, France, Poland, the Czech Republic, Slovakia, UK, Italy, Greece and other countries have started. There is only one landmark publication in the study those reconciliation processes: The work of the English-American political scientist Lily Gardner-Feldman Germany's Foreign Policy of Reconciliation (2012). This work highlights that the different processes of reconciliation have been a constant of West German politics and has been continued by its different governments. Since reconciliation is a long-term process, only the consistent and continuous orientation towards reconciliation could make the German reconciliation policy successful. Without this policy of reconciliation, German reunification in 1990 would not have been likely to be accepted. In addition to that interpretation and to analyses of speeches by German politicians, Gardner-Feldman discusses a list of factors which contributed in a different degree to the success of Germany's foreign policy of reconciliation: A favorable international context, EU integration, good relations between State leaders such as for example Adenauer and de Gaulle, confrontation with history, Civil Society engagement and religious leaders.

Studies on individual cases of German foreign policy of reconciliation deepened the level of analysis and confirmed or contested that view. The two volumes edited by Urszula Pękala alone and in joint editorship with Irene Dingel Ringen um Versöhnung (English: Wrestling for reconciliation) (2018 and 2019) confirmed the role of the Catholic and Protestant churches in German-Polish reconciliation. Using an interdisciplinary approach, Piotr Burgoński/Gregor Feindt and Bernhard Knorn in their contribution Versöhnung symbolisch kommuniziert. Die Messe in Kreisau am 12. November 1989 (Symbolically communicated reconciliation; The mass at Kreisau on November 12, 1989 in English translation) argue that symbolic communication is important because it is working on the subconsciousness and is creating a meaningful and congruent worldview with future potential. Not a contestation but a different evaluation and terminology has been pronounced by Corinne Defrance, an expert on German-French reconciliation. In newer publications, she contrasts the term of reconciliation by the term of "rapprochement". Defrance is underlining the deficits of German-French reconciliation on topics such as confrontation with history and attacks the "myth" of an achieved reconciliation. For Defrance reconciliation rather is a "never-ending process".

More intense criticism has been pronounced by experts on German-Israel-relations. Daniel Marwecki in his dissertation (2020) argues that there was no reconciliation, but rather an alliance of interests which brought persons such as Adenauer and Ben Gourion together.

A new field of reconciliation studies opened when German government started a reconciliation process with Greece after the 2008 crisis. German state activities to formulate apologies in Martyr villages and supporting projects through a future fund and the German-Greek Youth organization are laudable and create better relationships but reconciliation research also showed that these efforts often failed to meet the expectations to receive reparations of the victims of the war crimes during the Nazi occupation.

All cases of German reconciliation policies show deficits and require critical reconciliation studies.

=== Northern Ireland ===
The transformation of the Northern Ireland conflict from a violent conflict during the times of the "Troubles" into a mainly non-violent political issue, already in a very early stage has been accompanied by Christian Theologians and communities asking for reconciliation, developing the concept of reconciliation, acting for and living reconciliation. Communities such as Corrymeela (established in 1965), ecumenical women's groups are important contexts which inspired and enabled the negotiated settlement of the conflict. Main actors framed their political activities through reconciliation and ongoing debates are inspired by the still lacking full reconciliation. Actual controversies on reconciliation about Northern Ireland conflict are whether reconciliation is the right term to direct further development or whether rather justice or another term would be better. Mayor scientific discussions are as well on the possibility to transfer the quite specific example from Northern Ireland to other conflicts, and whether the lack of a truth and reconciliation commission and of other transitional justice activities has caused problems for the further process.

=== Rwanda ===
Reconciliation in post-1994 Rwanda is a process that began after the tragic genocide in which some 800,000 people, mostly Tutsis, were killed. After the massacres ended, the country faced a huge challenge of social and political reconstruction. One of the key elements of this process was the Gacaca tribunals, which aimed to try the perpetrators of the genocide at the local level. These tribunals, inspired by traditional Rwandan methods of conflict resolution, aimed not only to dispense justice, but also to promote reconciliation by allowing victims and perpetrators to meet face-to-face and bring about forgiveness and initiate a process of reconciliation. An estimated 2 million people were brought before the Gacaca tribunals between 2001 and 2012. In addition, the Catholic Church has played an important role in the reconciliation process, promoting forgiveness and non-retaliation as key elements of social reconstruction. Many reconciliation initiatives have focused on education, psychological support, pastoral care for prisoners and community development programs to rebuild trust between different ethnic groups. Despite these efforts, the reconciliation process in Rwanda remains difficult and complicated. According to an independent survey conducted between 2018 and 2021, 68% of Rwandans believe that “reconciliation is a process that is still ongoing,” while 22% of Rwandans believe that “reconciliation has not yet happened.” Only 11% of Rwandans say “reconciliation has already happened.” Many are still struggling with trauma, and some aspects of reconciliation are criticized as superficial or insufficient. Excessive control of the Rwandan state over the reconciliation process is pointed to as the main weakness of the reconciliation process in Rwanda. It is treated as one of the main elements of official state policy. A vision is promoted about reconciliation as a perfectly realized process which is expressed in the departure from the use of the name Hutu and Tutsi for Rwandans. Any attempts by foreign scholars in Rwanda to study reconciliation are distrusted and obstructed.

=== East Asia ===
The main issues of reconciliation in East Asia have been about Japan’s war with China and the United States and Japanese colonial rule over Chōson and Taiwan. As for the war with China, Japan’s reconciliation involved both the Kuomintang party and the Chinese Communist Party. Japan’s reconciliation with the Republic of China (Taiwan under the Kuomintang party) and the People’s Republic of China (China under the Chinese Communist Party) was complicated. Due to the dispute over which was the legitimate representative of China in the intensification of the Cold War, neither was invited to the San Francisco Peace Treaty in 1951 in which Japan made diplomatic reconciliation with former adversaries. Japan and Taiwan concluded the peace treaty in 1952. Taiwan waived Japan’s services in production, salvaging and other work for repairing the wartime damage. Later in 1972, Japan switched diplomatic recognition from Taiwan to China. Then Japan made diplomatic reconciliation with China in the Joint Communique in 1972. Japan expressed deep remorse and China renounced any claim for war reparations. Still, some Chinese forced laborers had been captured as prisoners of war by Japan and forcibly taken away to Japan. They were forced to work for hydropower plant construction and coal mining in wartime Japan. In the 1980s, they began seeking individual compensation from their former Japanese employers. They eventually made reconciliation with them; Japanese construction corporations, such as Kajima Corporation and Nishimatsu Construction, set up special funds to pay moral compensation to them in the 2000s.

Reconciliation between Japan and the United States has evolved from diplomatic reconciliation in the San Francisco Peace Treaty in 1951. Since then, the two states have maintained long-lasting alliance relations and deepened mutual confidence. The Japanese government started a program in 2009 to invite former American prisoners of war to Japan to promote mutual understanding. In May 2016, then U.S. President Barack Obama visited Hiroshima, urged for a peaceful world without nuclear weapons, met with atomic bomb survivors. In December of the same year, then Japanese Prime Minister Abe visited Pearl Harbor and offered “sincere and everlasting condolences” to the victims of Japan’s attack in December 1941.

As for colonialism, Japan expressed deep remorse and apologies for colonial rule in the statement of Prime Minister Murayama in 1995. Still, Japan has had difficulties in reconciliation particularly with South Korea in the issue of comfort women. Comfort women were young women and girls who were taken to former Japanese military installations, such as comfort stations, for a certain period during wartime in the past and forced to provide sexual services to officers and soldiers. There were many Korean comfort women. The Japanese government expressed deep remorse and sincere apologies to the former comfort women in the Kōno Statement in 1993 and made moral compensation through the Asian Women’s Fund starting in 1995. Yet many survivors and their supporter activists criticized and rejected the moral compensation since they recognized that only legal responsibility could vindicate their dignity. Still, the Japanese government has not acknowledged its legal responsibility due to the absence of official documents found about forced recruitment of comfort women. This point has remained a thorn in the reconciliation efforts between the two states. After renewed efforts for reconciliation, the two governments agreed in 2015 to resolve the issue of comfort women “finally and irreversibly.” Still, this failed to completely resolve the issue. The Healing and Reconciliation Foundation established in 2016 based on the agreement, funded by the Japanese government and operated by the Korean government, was dissolved by the South Korean government in 2019. While two-thirds of the survivors accepted money from the foundation, Korean supporters for the survivors recognized the absence of explicit acknowledgement of legal responsibility of Japan as problem.

Japan and South Korea also had the issue of compensation for former conscripted workers from the Korean peninsula. The two governments disputed whether their claims settlement agreement in 1965 had already resolved any issues stemming from the colonial era from 1910 to 1945. The Japanese government has continued to insist that the 1965 agreement covers the issue of former conscripted workers from the Korean peninsula. In March 2023, South Korean president Yun made political decision to conduct a third-party compensation scheme: a Korean government-backed fund, donated by South Korean companies, will shoulder the compensation payments to South Korean plaintiffs who won the compensation lawsuits against Japanese companies which employed them during the wartime. Though the South Korean government expects that Japanese companies also participate in the donation, Japanese companies have not yet joined. As of December 2024, all the surviving plaintiffs so far have received compensation from the fund.

== Organizations ==
- Instutite of International Reconciliation Studies at Waseda University
- Jena Center for Reconciliation Studies
- Mary Hoch Center for Reconciliation at the Carter School for Peace and Conflict Resolution
- The Bonn Center for Reconciliation Studies
- The Center for Reconciliation Studies in Saint Stephens University in Canada
- The Center for Reconciliation at Duke University
- The Center for Peace and Reconciliation Studies in Coventry

== Sources ==
- Appleby, R.Scott (2000). The Ambivalence of the Sacred. Religion, Violence, and Reconciliation. Lanham: Rowman & Littlefield
- Aristophanes, Lysistrata and other Plays. Translated from the Greek. London: Penguin ISBN 0140442871
- Auerbach, Yehudith (2009). The Reconciliation Pyramid – A Narrative-Based Framework for Analyzing Identity Conflicts, in Political Psychology, 30 (2). https://doi.org/10.1111/j.1467-9221.2008.00692.x
- Avedian, Vahagn (2024). The Theory of Collective Reconciliation: A Trinity of Recognition, Responsibility and Reparation. London: Routledge ISBN 9781032325934
- Bar-Siman-Tov, Yaacov (ed. (2004)), From Conflict Resolution to Reconciliation. Oxford: Oxford University Press. ISBN 0-19-516643-4
- Bar-Tal, D. (2009). Reconciliation as a Foundation of Culture of Peace. In J. de Rivera (Ed.), Handbook on Building Cultures of Peace (pp. 363–377). Springer New York. https://doi.org/10.1007/978-0-387-09575-2_25
- Bar-Tal, Daniel, Intractable Conflicts (2015). Socio-psychological foundations and Dynamics. Cambridge: Cambridge University Press- ISBN 1107562546
- Baum, Gregory and Harold Wells (1997) Reconciliation of Peoples: Challenge to the Churches. Eugene, Oregon: Wipf & Stock Publishers
- Bloomfield, D., Barnes, T., Huyse, L., & International Institute for Democracy and Electoral Assistance (Eds.). (2003). Reconciliation after violent conflict: A handbook. International IDEA
- Brounéus, K. (2003). Reconciliation: Theory and practice for development cooperation. The Swedish International Development Cooperation Agency
- Doxtader, Eric/ Villa-Vicencio, Charles (eds.) (2003), Through Fire and Water. The Roots of Division and the Potential for Reconciliation in Africa. Washington DC: Africa Research and Publications ISBN 1592210848
- Du Toit, Fanie (2018) When Political Transition works. Reconciliation as Interdependence. Oxford: Oxford University Press. ISBN 0190881852
- Gardner-Feldman, Lily (2012), Germany's foreign policy of Reconciliation. From Enmity and Amity. London: Rowman&Littlefield Publishers. ASIN:B008RAKQWM
- Gobodo-Madikizela, Pumla (2004) A Human Being Died That Night. A South African Woman Confronts the Legacy of Apartheid. Boston: Mariner Books: ASIN: B00XWXRE5Q
- Gopin, Marc (2000), Holy War, Holy Peace. How Religion can bring Peace to the Middle East. Oxford: Oxford University Press.
- Govier, T. (2006). Taking Wrongs Seriously: Acknowledgement, Reconciliation, and the Politics of Sustainable Peace. Humanities Press
- Halperine, Eran (2015), Emotions in Conflict: Inhibitors and Facilitators of Peace Making (Routledge Studies in Political Psychology, Band 2. London. Routledge. ISBN 1138123420
- Hegel, Georg Wilhelm Friedrich (1807) Phänomenologie des Geistes. in Wolfgang Bonsiepen and Reinhard Heede (eds.,1980). ISBN 978-3-7873-4158-0
- Keyes, S. (2019). Mapping on Approaches to Reconciliation. The Network for Religious and Traditional Peacemakers, 1–24
- Kriesberg, L. (2007). Reconciliation: Aspects, Growth, and Sequences. Louis Kriesberg: Pioneer in Peace and Constructive Conflict Resolution Studies, 12(1), 1–21
- Kutz, Susanne, Dirk Wegner and Dan Bar-On (2000): Bridging the Gap: Storytelling as a Way to Work through Political and Collective Hostilities, Hamburg: Körber-Stiftung
- Lederach, J. P. (1997). Building peace: Sustainable reconciliation in divided societies. United States Institute of Peace Press
- Lederach, J. P. (2005). The moral imagination: The art and soul of building peace. Oxford University Press
- Leiner, M. (2018). Conclusion: From Conflict Resolution to Reconciliation. In M. Leiner & C. Schliesser (Eds.), Alternative Approaches in Conflict Resolution (pp. 175–185). Springer International Publishing. https://doi.org/10.1007/978-3-319-58359-4_17
- Leiner, M., & Schliesser, C. (Eds.). (2018). Alternative Approaches in Conflict Resolution. Springer International Publishing. https://doi.org/10.1007/978-3-319-58359-4
- Little, A., & Maddison, S. (2017). Reconciliation, transformation, struggle: An introduction. International Political Science Review, 38(2), 145–154. https://doi.org/10.1177/0192512116681808
- Malley-Morrison, Kathleen/Mercurio, Andrea/Twose, Gabriel (eds.) (2013), International Handbook of Peace and Reconciliation: New York: Springer. ISBN 978-1-4614-5932-3.
- Marwecki, Daniel (2020), Germany and Israeli: Whitewashing and Statebuilding. London: C Hurst & Co Publishers Ltd. ISBN 978-1787383180
- Nadler, Arie/ Malloy, Thomas E./ Fisher, Jeffrey D. (eds.) (2008), The Social Psychology of Intergroup Reconciliation. Oxford: Oxford University Press 2008. ISBN 978-0-19-530031-4
- Pękala, Urszula/Irena Dingel (Eds.(2018)), Ringen um Versöhnung. Religion und Politik im Verhältnis zwischen Deutschland und Polen seit 1945. Göttingen: Vandenhoeck&Ruprecht. ISBN 978-3-525-57069-2
- Philpott, Daniel (2006), The Politics of Past Evil. Religion, Reconciliation and the Dilemmas of Transitional Justice. Notre Dame: University of Notre Dame Press. ASIN: B016YLHTSY
- Philpott, Daniel. (2012). Just and Unjust Peace: An Ethic of Political Reconciliation. Just and Unjust Peace: An Ethic of Political Reconciliation. 10.1093/acprof:oso/9780199827565.001.0001
- Rosa, Hartmut (2012), Weltbeziehungen in einem Zeitalter der Beschleunigung. Umrisse einer neuen Gesellschaftskritik. Frankfurt/Main: Suhrkamp. ISBN 978-3-518-29577-9
- Tutu, D. (1999). No Future Without Forgiveness. Doubleday
- Verdeja, E. (2009). Unchopping a tree: Reconciliation in the aftermath of political violence. Temple University Press
- Volf, Miroslav (1996), Exclusion and Embrace: A Theological Exploration of Identity, Otherness, and Reconciliation. London: Paragon OS. ISBN 0687002826.
