= Sulochana Peiris =

Documentary maker, writer and researcher in Sri Lanka

- Citizenship: Sri Lanka
- Education: University of Colombo
- Occupations: Journalist, documentary film-maker
- Notable work: GoHomeGota (film)

Sulochana Peiris is a film maker and journalist from Sri Lanka. Her career began as a reporter for the Sunday Leader. She subsequently moved into documentary film-making, including the film #GoHomeGota which documented the 2022 Sri Lankan protests. Since release the film as only been screened once in Sri Lanka, due to its political sensitivity. The film has been screened outside the country in Austria, Ireland, the Netherlands, South Africa and the United Kingdom.

== Career ==
Peiris has an MA in Conflict and Peace Studies awarded by the University of Colombo. Her journalistic career began as a reporter for the Sunday Leader. A significant work is the film #GoHomeGota which follows the 2022 Sri Lankan protests. Her 2024 documentary, Incensed: Sri Lanka’s Buddhist Supremacy and Minority Communities, explored the issues that religious pluralism faced in Sri Lanka, inspired by the weaponisation of the International Covenant for Civil and Political Rights within the context of Sinhala Buddhist supremacy in the country. Peiris has commented on how the Sri Lankan constitution has a framework to avoid religious violence, but this framework is not applied. Other work includes a short film on Shreen Saroor, who was awarded the inaugural N-Peace Award.

== #GoHomeGota ==
Entitled #GoHomeGota after the social media hashtag used by protestors who urged the incumbent president Gotabaya Rajapaksa to leave office, her 2023 documentary follows the 2022 Sri Lankan protests and includes footage taken in the months preceding the 9 July revolution. The film interviewed a range of activists, including Nirmal Ranjith Dewasiri, Ambika Satkunanathan and Sanjana Hattotuwa. Peiris' motivation for the documentary was to provide source material for students of social movements, however since release the film as only been screened once in Sri Lanka, due to its political sensitivity. The film has been screened outside the country in Austria, Ireland, the Netherlands and the United Kingdom, as well as locations in South Africa such as the Johannesburg Genocide and Holocaust Centre. In a review for Polity, the film was described as:

Despite providing sustained reflection on the movement’s tensions and limitations, the film’s greatest strength is perhaps that it does so without detracting from the optimism and energy of the protests and the possibilities for systemic change contained within it.

— Oliver Walton, Deborah Johnson, and Jonathan Goodhand

== Filmography ==
- #GoHomeGota (2023)
- Incensed: Sri Lanka’s Buddhist Supremacy and Minority Communities (2024)

== Personal life ==
Peiris is Buddhist. As of 2024 she was based in Colombo.
