= Nirmal Ranjith Dewasiri =

Sri Lankan historian

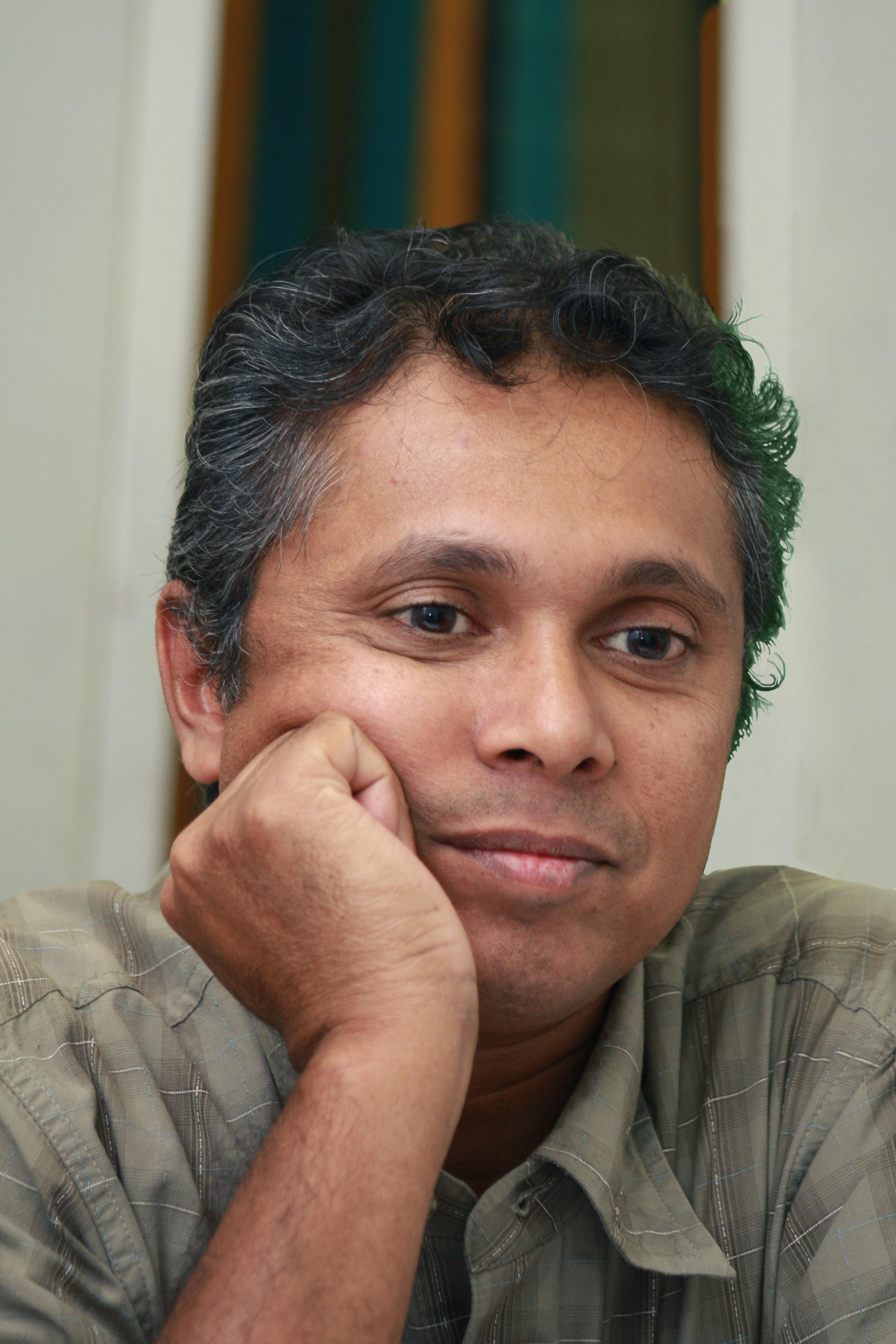
- Born: 18 October 1965 (age 60); Gampaha, Sri Lanka
- Other name: Vama
- Education: Prince of Wales' College; University of Colombo (B.A., M.Phil.); Leiden University (Ph.D.)
- Occupation: Professor
- Political party: Left Party

Nirmal Ranjith Dewasiri (also spelled Devasiri)(Sinhala: ආචාර්ය නිර්මාල් රංජිත් දේවසිරි ) born on 18 October 1965 is a Professor at the Department of History at the University of Colombo, Sri Lanka. Currently he is the head of Department. He specialises in social transformation in agrarian societies, history and ideology, European colonialism in Asia, post-colonial state-building, and ethno-nationalism.

== Education ==
Dewasiri attended Prince of Wales' College, Moratuwa. He received his BA and M.Phil. from University of Colombo in Sri Lanka. He read his PhD from Leiden University in the Netherlands.

His BA thesis explored the political impact of Rohana Wijeweera, the charismatic leader of two armed insurrections of Southern Province, Sri Lanka. In pursuing his master's degree, he analyzed the formation of Sinhala nationalist ideology in the nineteenth and early twentieth centuries. He is making an argument to Sinhala Buddhist nationalism like party of Jathika Hela Urumaya( JHU) Examine Myth of Tamil homeland theory(Tamil Eelam) and Sinhala homeland theory. He Explores that, Sinhala Society has been built under four Mythologies. Buddha's visit to Sri Lanka, Advent of Prince Vijaya, advent of (Reverent)Arahath Mahinda Thero and King Dutugemunu's war to vanquish King Elara. According to his study, Sinhalese accept these four Myths and Tamils accept the homeland theory, because they would like to believe it. As a Historian he is analyzing history as a discursive construction.

His doctoral thesis, The Adaptable Peasant: Agrarian Society in Western Sri Lanka under Dutch Rule, 1740 1800 studied the impact of the Dutch East India Company on western Sri Lanka's agrarian society. According to Dewasiri, these changes led to private property and the emergence of a powerful landowner class.

== Political activism ==
As Political activist Nirmal has strong experience working with deference Political groups since he was student. Recently He was the secretary of "X-group" Sri Lanka which divided in 2005 Now Dewasiri was a leader of the Post-modernist new"X-group" and President of The Federation of University Teachers' Association (FUTA) in 2012-2014. In 2010, he was appointed a key advisor to the Cultural and National Heritage Ministry. After the media reports related to closure of the USAID, Dr Dewasiri was alleged for receiving support provided by the USAID to publish books against Sri Lankan culture and Buddhism. He features in the 2023 film #GoHomeGota by Sri Lankan journalist Sulochana Peiris.

== Publications ==
=== Books ===
- Dewasiri, Nirmal (2007). The Adaptable Peasant. Agrarian Society in Western Sri Lanka under Dutch Rule, 1740–1800. Brill Academic Publishers. ISBN 978-90-04-16508-3.
- Dewasiri, Nirmal Ranjith, J.V.P. Ethnic Problem and Marxism (in Sinhala), X Group Publication, 2006

=== Articles (in Sinhala) ===
- "Problems of Teaching Languages in the Universities of Sri Lanka." In Sarasa Journal, Sinhala Society of University of Colombo, 2001.
- "To Escape from the Trap of War"- an Analysis of the War, Ethnic Conflict and Related Issues. Inter-Ethnic Fraternity, Colombo, 1995.
- "Towards a New Left Politics." In Pravada, April 1995.
- "The Ethnic Problem: Issues and Solutions." In Pravada, June–August 1995.
- "Democracy Against Capitalism." In Manpetha, A Sinhala Quarterly Journal 1993.
- "President Ranasingha Premadasa: The Person and Politics." A series of articles, Yukthiya, a Sinhala weekly Tabloid, May–July 1993.
- "Politics of Kandalama and Capital: A review of the Campaign against the Construction of a Tourist Hotel on the Bund of the Kandalama Tank. Pravada Monthly Journal, July–August 1992.

=== Book Reviews (in Sinhala) ===
- Silva, K.T., Caste, Class and Changing Sri Lankan Society. (Kandy, 1996), in Pravada, 1997.
- Andradi, T., Marxism Against Plundering Capitalism: A Comparative Historical Analysis (1993), in Pravada, October–November 1993.
- Dissanayake, W., Left Movement in Sri Lanka:An Analytical Approach (Education and Research Institute for People's Action, Colombo, 1992), in Pravada, December 1992.
- Dharmasekera, G.I.D., The Burning World and Vishvatharaism (Chinthana Parshadaya, 1991), in Pravada, May 1992
