= Hithumathe Jeewithe =

Hithumathe Jeewithe හිතුමතේ ජීවිතේ
- Directed by: Chrishantha Manamperi
- Written by: Indika Athula Priyantha
- Based on: True story
- Produced by: Vihara Samarasinghe
- Starring: Dineth de Silva; Mahendra Perera; Jagath Chamila; Kumara Thirimadura
- Cinematography: Nishantha Pradeep
- Edited by: Rukmal Nirosh
- Music by: Sagara Wijesinghe
- Production company: VS Films
- Distributed by: Movie Works Pvt. Ltd. (MWPL)
- Release date: 15 September 2022
- Country: Sri Lanka
- Language: Sinhala

Hithumathe Jeewithe (The Wandering Life) (Sinhala: හිතුමතේ ජීවිතේ) is a 2022 Sri Lankan Sinhala biographical thriller film directed by Chrishantha Manamperi as his debut direction and produced by Vihara Samarasinghe for VS Films. It stars Dineth de Silva in lead role as titular character along with Mahendra Perera and Kumara Thirimadura. Music composed by Sagara Wijesinghe.

The film qualified for the 19th Dhaka International Film Festival which will be held in Dhaka, Bangladesh from 16 to 24 January 2021. It is also the first international film festival to represent by the film. It is to be screened under the non-competitive category of 'World Cinema Division'.

== Background ==
Rathugahagedara Gamage Don Sumathipala who became well known as 'Hithumathe Jeewithe' based on the same words marked across his chest was a murder convict who was serving on the death row in Sri Lankan prisons. At the age of 17, he was made a criminal by the urge to avenge the gang rape and brutal murder of his school-going sister. Those responsible for this heinous crimes were none other than the Headquarters Inspector (HQI) of Kalutara Police, the school Principal, a politician and a few others. Served with several death sentences, Sumathipala was in prison for over four decades, escaping seven times finally receiving a Presidential pardon.

His criminal record was special as he was sentenced to death on four occasions based on the 'crimes' of killing members of a group which gang raped and murdered his younger sister. Though the brutish rapist and killers escaped the system of justice, they could not do so from the loving brother of the sister they have killed.

Hailing from a small hamlet off Kalutara, Sumathipala's sister was crowned as the Beauty Queen of the village's Sinhala New Year Festival in 1972. But subsequent to this the HQI of Kalutara, who was the chief guest at the event followed the young girl who refused his congratulatory wish with a kiss. Enraged by this, the brutish police officer abducted the young girl with the support of those 'respectable leaders' in the area, school principal, GramaSevaka and a politician. She was gang raped and killed and her body was burnt to destroy all the evidence. Sumathipala who was just 17 years then visited the Police Station and killed the HQI on the spot and beheaded him. He carried the HQI's head and handed it over to the Superintendent of Police in the area. The result, he was convicted and sentenced to death in 1975. However Sumathipala escaped from the prison on seven occasions and killed the rest of the killers of his sister.

== Cast ==
- Dineth de Silva as Sumathipala aka "Hithumathe Jeewithe"
- Mahendra Perera as Raja
- Jayani Senanayake as Sumathipala's mother
- Kumara Thirimadura as Sumathipala's father
- Mariyon Weththsinghe as Chandra Kumari
- Damitha Abeyratne as Rasika
- Priyankara Rathnayake as IP Dasanayake
- Jagath Chamila as Wimale
- Palitha Silva as Marasinghe
- Anuruddhika Padukkage as Anoma
- Gihan Fernando as Gastan
- Ishan Gammudali as Laiya
- Sarath Kothalawala as Sira
- Harshika Rathnayake as Doctor Mrs. Jesudasan
- Sarath Chandrasiri as Siripala aka "Maru Sira"

== Production ==
The story was from the seventies so the crew had to make a new set. Therefore, they created all the scenes in the city of Colombo anew. In addition to areas such as Colombo Fort, it was also filmed in areas such as Kuliyapitiya and Giriulla. Shooting completed at the end of 2019. The film was supposed to be released a year ago. But it took a long time because of the COVID-19 pandemic.

The story is based on Udeni Saman Kumara's novel titled "Hithumathe Jeewithe". The screenplay was done by Indika Athula Priyantha and directed by Group Captain Chrishantha Manamperi as his maiden cinema direction. Product Design and Manufacturing done by Vihara Samarasinghe and assistant directors are Chaminda Hewawasam, Janaka Abeyratne, and Pabasara Samaranayake. Nishantha Pradeep made cinematography with the camera support by Chanuka Sanjeeva, Nalin De Priyadarshana, and Damith Gunawardena. The film was edited by Rukmal Nirosh, and assisted by Lahiru Seneviratne. The Feature Writing done by Priyantha Ishwara and assisted by Nimesh Perera, and Sumudu Jayaweera.

Ranjith De Silva made art direction with the assistance of Rohitha Jayathilake, Heshan Perera, and Amila Dissanayake. Production Executive is Chaminda Polkottuwa. Still Photography handled by Anil Jayasinghe whereas Cataloging, Subtitling and Special Effects by J. Veerakkodi for Vinoy Media Networks. Background Music Direction composed by Sagara Wijesinghe and Sound recording by Dinesh Ekanayake. Line Production completed by Dushanta Polkotuva, Nilantha Bakmeevewa with Lighting artists by Pradeep Perera, Nimal Jayasiri, Priyath Chamara, and Nilantha Sanjaya.

== Screening ==
The premiere of the film was held at Wellawatta Savoy Premier Cinemas in September 2022. The film was screened in islandwide cinemas from 15 September 2022.
