= Wolfgang Bonsiepen =

German philosopher (1946–2015)

- Born: April 1, 1946
- Died: February 14, 2015 (aged 68)

Academic background
- Education: Ruhr University Bochum (Dr. phil., habil.)
- Theses: Der Begriff der Negativität in den Jenaer Schriften Hegels (1972); Die Begründung einer Naturphilosophie bei Kant, Schelling, Fries und Hegel mathematische versus spekulative Naturphilosophie (1995)

Academic work
- Era: Contemporary philosophy
- Region: Western philosophy
- School or tradition: Hegelianism
- Institutions: Ruhr University Bochum

Wolfgang Bonsiepen (April 1, 1946 – February 14, 2015) was a German professor of philosophy at Ruhr University Bochum.

== Works ==
=== Monographs ===
- Bonsiepen, Wolfgang (1997). Die Begründung einer Naturphilosophie bei Kant, Schelling, Fries und Hegel: mathematische versus spekulative Naturphilosophie. Frankfurt am Main: V. Klostermann. ISBN 978-3-465-02889-5. OL 779840M.
- Bonsiepen, Wolfgang (1977-01-01). Der Begriff der Negativität in den Jenaer Schriften Hegels (in German). FELIX MEINER VERLAG. doi:10.28937/978-3-7873-2920-5. ISBN 978-3-7873-2920-5.

=== Critical editions ===
==== Phenomenology of Spirit ====
- Hegel, Georg Wilhelm Friedrich (1988-01-01). Friedrich, Hans; Bonsiepen, Wolfgang (eds.). Phänomenologie des Geistes (in German). FELIX MEINER VERLAG. doi:10.28937/978-3-7873-2464-4. ISBN 978-3-7873-2464-4.
- Hegel, Georg Wilhelm Friedrich (1980-01-01). Bonsiepen, Wolfgang; Heede, Reinhard (eds.). Phänomenologie des Geistes (in German). FELIX MEINER VERLAG. doi:10.28937/978-3-7873-3389-9. ISBN 978-3-7873-3389-9.

==== Encyclopaedia of the Philosophical Sciences in Basic Outline ====
- Hegel, Georg Wilhelm Friedrich (2000-01-01). Bonsiepen, Wolfgang; Grotsch, Klaus; Christian, Hans; Rameil, Udo (eds.). Enzyklopädie der philosophischen Wissenschaften im Grundrisse (1817) (in German). FELIX MEINER VERLAG. doi:10.28937/978-3-7873-3393-6. ISBN 978-3-7873-3393-6.
- Hegel, Georg Wilhelm Friedrich (1989-01-01). Bonsiepen, Wolfgang; Christian, Hans (eds.). Enzyklopädie der philosophischen Wissenschaften im Grundrisse (1827) (in German). FELIX MEINER VERLAG. doi:10.28937/978-3-7873-3401-8. ISBN 978-3-7873-3401-8.
- Hegel, Georg Wilhelm Friedrich (1992-01-01). Bonsiepen, Wolfgang; Christian, Hans; Rameil, Udo (eds.). Enzyklopädie der philosophischen Wissenschaften im Grundrisse (1830) (in German). FELIX MEINER VERLAG. doi:10.28937/978-3-7873-3402-5. ISBN 978-3-7873-3402-5.
- Hegel, Georg Wilhelm Friedrich (2012-08-01). Bonsiepen, Wolfgang (ed.). Vorlesungen über die Philosophie der Natur I (in German). FELIX MEINER VERLAG. doi:10.28937/978-3-7873-3408-7. ISBN 978-3-7873-3408-7.
