= Colombo Telegraph =

Sri lankan online newspaper

- Website type: Online newspaper
- Available in: English, Sinhala
- Editor: Uvindu Kurukulasuriya
- Website: www.colombotelegraph.com
- Launched: 2011
- Current status: Active

The Colombo Telegraph is a Sri Lankan website run by exiled journalists. It was founded in 2011. It has been blocked in Sri Lanka repeatedly. Uvindu Kurukulasuriya is the editor. He went into exile to UK in 2009 after the murder of Lasantha Wickrematunge and after he was threatened publicly via national radio by the president's media advisor.
