= List of Sri Lankan Americans =

This is a list of notable Sri Lankan American citizens, including both original immigrants who obtained American citizenship and their American descendants, but does not include Sri Lankan nationals living or working in the U.S. The list includes a brief description of the reason for their notability.

== Academics ==
- Rohan Abeyaratne – academic and engineer
- Athula Attygalle – professor in mass spectrometry
- Ananda Coomaraswamy – philosopher
- Sarath Gunapala – solid-state physicist, senior research scientist and group supervisor at NASA's Jet Propulsion Laboratory
- Shelton Gunaratne – Professor Emeritus of Mass Communications at Minnesota State University Moorhead
- Ratnajeevan Hoole – professor in Electrical and Computer Engineering at Michigan State University
- Curuppumullage Jinarajadasa – freemason, theosophist and president of the Theosophical Society Adyar
- Nalin Kulatilaka – Professor of Finance at School of Management
- Patrick Mendis – educator, diplomat, author, and executive in US government service
- Anura C. Perera – science writer, astronomer
- Cyril Ponnamperuma – chemist, astrobiologist
- Nalin Samarasinha – astronomer, first Sri Lankan to have an asteroid named after him
- Siva Sivananthan – professor, scientist and Director of the Microphysics Laboratory at the University of Illinois
- Murugesu Sivapalan – Engineer and hydrologist, University of Illinois Urbana-Champaign
- Stanley Jeyaraja Tambiah – Esther and Sidney Rabb Professor of Anthropology, Emeritus, Harvard University
- Sam Weerahandi – former professor; first ASA Fellow of Sri Lankan origin

== Architecture ==
- Raj Barr-Kumar – former president of the AIA

== Artists ==
- Anne Cherubim – painter

== Business ==
- Raj Fernando – chairman and CEO of Scoutahead.com and philanthropist
- Sanjay Kumar – businessman
- Kumar Mahadeva – entrepreneur and CEO
- Namal Nawana – CEO of Smith & Nephew
- Chamath Palihapitiya – venture capitalist, software developer
- Raj Rajaratnam – founder of Galleon Group, a New York-based hedge fund management firm, convicted of insider trading
- Bandula Wijay – inventor, businessman, and diplomat. Invented "Nested Loop" vascular stent.

== Film ==
- Thushari Jayasekera – actress, writer, emcee, and performance artist; with her role on NBC's Outsourced (2010–2011), she is the first American actress of Sri Lankan origin to play a principal role in a primetime show on a major American TV network
- Chandran Rutnam – film director, producer, screenwriter
- Sanjit De Silva – actor, known for roles in The Company Men and American Desi
- Maya Stojan – actress
- Fabianne Therese – actress, director
- Bernard White – actor, screenwriter, film director
- Gina Zamparelli – Los Angeles-based concert promoter, daughter of Maureen Hingert

== Military ==
- John K. Beling – Rear Admiral of the United States Navy

== Musicians ==
- Dilan Jay – rapper and record producer; first Sri Lankan-American to appear on the Billboard charts
- Clarence Jey – US Billboard and Grammy-credited record producer and songwriter
- Ranidu Lankage – rapper
- Ruwanga Samath – record producer and the president of The Bird Call Productions

== Politicians ==
- Basil Rajapaksa – former Member of the Sri Lankan Parliament, former Sri Lankan Minister of Finance
- Gotabaya Rajapaksa – 8th President of Sri Lanka; US citizen from 2003 to 2019

== Rebels ==
- Visvanathan Rudrakumaran – chairman of the Transnational Government of Tamil Eelam, a pro-LTTE (Liberation Tigers of Tamil Ealam) organization (the LTTE has been described as a terrorist organization by the US, the European Union and many other countries)

== Religion ==
- Bawa Muhaiyaddeen – teacher and Sufi mystic
- Witiyala Seewalie Thera – founder/president and abbot of the Minnesota Buddhist Vihara, Deputy Chief Sangha Nayaka of North America

== Singers ==
- Tharanga Goonetilleke – opera singer
- Danielle de Niese – opera singer
- Sean Panikkar – opera singer
- Lara Raj – singer and member of Katseye

== Sports ==
- Nagalingam Ethirveerasingam – Olympian for 1952 and 1956 Olympic Games
- Barney Henricus – 1938 British Empire Games boxing gold medallist
- Christine Sonali Merrill – Olympian for 2012 Olympic Games, engineer
- Roy Silva – cricketer who has represented the US in Twenty20 International
- Upeshka De Silva – professional poker player
- Tiana Sumanasekera – member of the U.S. national gymnastics team
- Sunil Weeramantry – chess trainer, author

== Writers ==
- Indran Amirthanayagam – author
- V. V. Ganeshananthan – fiction writer, essayist, and journalist
- Patrick Mendis – educator, diplomat, author, and executive in US government service
- Mary Anne Mohanraj – speculative fiction writer and editor who helped found Strange Horizons
- Nayomi Munaweera – author
- Leah Lakshmi Piepzna-Samarasinha – poet, writer, educator, social activist
- Romesh Ratnesar – journalist, author
- Rosemary Rogers – best-selling author of romance novels in the US; has been on the New York Times best-sellers list
- Sunil Yapa – fiction writer, author of Your Heart Is a Muscle The Size of a Fist (2016), which he promoted as a guest on Late Night with Seth Meyers

== Others ==
- Natalie and Nadiya Anderson – twin sisters who competed in The Amazing Race and Survivor
- Rifqa Bary – author, subject of the Rifqa Bary controversy

== See also ==
- List of Sri Lankans
