= Peaceful War =

2013 book by Patrick Mendis

Peaceful War: How the Chinese Dream and the American Destiny Create a Pacific New World Order
- First edition
- Author: Patrick Mendis
- Language: English
- Genre: Sino-American relations, US foreign policy, Chinese foreign policy, international relations, Pacific affairs
- Publisher: Rowman & Littlefield (United States)
- Publication date: October 2013
- Publication place: United States
- Media type: Print (hardcover), (softcover), (ebook)
- Pages: 318
- ISBN: 978-0-7618-6187-4 (hardcover), 978-0-7618-6186-7 (paperback), 978-0-7618-6188-1 (ebook)
- Preceded by: Commercial Providence

Peaceful War: How the Chinese Dream and the American Destiny Create a Pacific New World Order is a book written by Patrick Mendis. It provides an analysis of the unfolding drama between the clashing forces of the Chinese dream and the American Dream. The foreword to the book is written by Jack Goldstone, the Virginia and John Hazel Professor of Public Policy at George Mason University.

In 2012, Professor Mendis coined the new term "Pacific Dream" to describe possible outcomes resulting from the interface between the Sino-American policies and initiatives of US President Barack Obama and Chinese Communist Party general secretary Xi Jinping that resonate with the American Dream and the Chinese dream. In April 2013, US Secretary of State John Kerry officially unveiled President Obama's vision of the "Pacific Dream" to deliver mutual benefits among all stakeholders in the region.

The themes of Mendis' book are seemingly drawn from ideas expressed during his extensive study and lecture tours in 2012 and 2013 at prestigious universities and institutions in China, Hong Kong, Singapore, Sri Lanka, Taiwan, and elsewhere in Asia and America. These include the lectures at the Chinese Academy of Social Sciences in Beijing and the Sun Yat-sen University in Guangzhou. His other related publications appeared in the Yale Journal of International Affairs, the Columbia University's Journal of International Affairs, the Minnesota Post, as well as the South China Morning Post in Hong Kong.

== Summary and Contents ==
The book contains a comparative analysis of the distinctive and different philosophies between the People's Republic of China's millennia-old Confucian civilization and the young republic of the United States and its founding vision. The author explains that "America and China are two republics—the 'Old and Young.' China is an old and evolved civilization while America is new and created by enlightened men" (in 1776); however, "their approaches are different" in domestic governance and international affairs.

In a book review of the author's previous book, Commercial Providence, the United States' hidden and esoteric traditions as embedded in the symbolism and architectural design of Washington, DC, and the secret destiny of the American empire were revealed. In his Peaceful War, Mendis also uncovered a number of previously unknown similarities, especially in the esoteric traditions of architectural designs of the Forbidden City surrounded by Tienanmen Square in the historic center of Beijing and the square-shaped original Federal City that encloses the Federal Triangle in Washington, DC. The author furthermore contrasts American foreign policy traditions derived from Thomas Jefferson and Alexander Hamilton and China's adaptation of them. Such examples include Beijing's revision of America's Manifest Destiny in its policies within the Indian Ocean and its reworking of the Monroe Doctrine in the Pacific Ocean, the South China Sea, and the East China Sea.

Within his new book, Mendis explains that similar to the experience of the United States in having its foreign policy traditions spread over the Pacific Ocean and into Hawaii and the Philippines, the post Deng Xiaoping’s China has practically been using "Hamiltonian means to Jeffersonian ends" and borrowed the founding idea inspired by the American Dream as a model for China's peaceful rise in the Indo-Pacific region. The so-called Chinese dream, as reinvented by Xi Jinping, seems to continue Deng's Hamiltonian experiment of the economic liberalization into the twenty-first century.

With a possible "fiscal cliff" in America and a "social cliff" in China, the author revisits the history of Sino-American relations to explore the prospects for a return to the long-forgotten Beijing-Washington love affair launched in the trade-for-peace era before the First Opium War in the nineteenth century. During his two-month book and lecture tour in the late 2013 in China, Dr. Mendis told a Beijing news reporter 傅立钢 of the China Trade News that "economic and trade cooperation between China and the US" must now be carried out within "a legal framework" as global commerce has become the "mainstream."

== The American Vision of the "Pacific Dream" ==
The author envisions that President Obama's Asia pivot strategy and the new Silk Road plan of Xi Jinping will eventually create a "Pacific Dream" and a New World Order of peace and prosperity for all. The key question raised in the book is: "Will China ultimately evolve into a democratic nation by rewriting the American Dream in Chinese characters, and how might this transpire?" As a strategic partner in the Pacific tasked with accommodating China's peaceful rise, President Obama's Secretary of State Kerry outlined America's vision of the "Pacific Dream" for mutual benefit and a more peaceful world as he reiterated former Secretary Hillary Clinton's previous announcement on President Obama's Asia pivot strategy and the Trans-Pacific Partnership.

According to the author of Peaceful War, the idea of the Pacific Dream can be traced back to the Louisiana Purchase as President Thomas Jefferson wanted to find a "short-cut" to China through the Pacific Northwest. Jefferson sought to extend his vision of the Empire of Liberty and the American Dream resonating from his national motto "Life, liberty and the pursuit of happiness" to the rest of the world. The democratic experience that evolved over the next two-hundred plus years has its own struggles and weaknesses but the American Dream has always been part of the DNA of the American Republic since its founding, and was revived later in Dr. Martin Luther King Jr.'s famous 1963 speech I Have a Dream.

In response to the author's question at the Aspen Institute in Washington, his former boss Secretary of State Colin Powell reminds the American public that the United States has historically had its own challenges with women, African-Americans, and Native-Americans, and echoed that China has similar challenges in achieving the Chinese dream. The author has served as a military professor and an American diplomat in the Clinton and Bush administrations. He is a commissioner of the US National Commission for UNESCO at the US Department of State—an appointment made by the Obama administration at the recommendation of US Senator Amy Klobuchar, former Senate Majority Leader Tom Daschle, and former Vice President Walter Mondale.

== Praise by Chinese and American leaders ==
Colonel Lawrence Wilkerson, former chief of staff to Secretary Colin Powell, writes about the book: "A dazzling analysis, full of history, philosophy, ironic similarities and unusual distinctions, fears and hopes, but mostly dreams—the kind of dreams Mahatma Gandhi, Martin Luther King Jr. and Nelson Mandela dreamed. For that reason and more, Peaceful War is worth reading."

United States Senator Thomas Daschle, former senate majority leader, explains that the book "luminously situated President Obama’s Asia pivot that is often lost in geopolitical writing."

Former acting CIA Director John E. McLaughlin states that "No international strategic relationship is more important or more consequential than that between the United States and China—now and as far as we can reasonably see into the future. ... Anyone seeking a holistic understanding of the Sino-U.S. relationship—and where it might be heading—should read this book."

China's leading authority on Sino-American relations Professor Shen Dingli at Fudan University in Shanghai calls the book a "landmark work" while Dr. Wei Hongxia at the Chinese Academy of Social Sciences in Beijing describes it as a "wise, welcome, and timely" exploration comparing Chinese and American national discourses and the future of their relations.

Professor Tang Xiaosong, the president of the Center for American Studies at the Guangdong University of Foreign Studies in Guangzhou, characterizes the author as "a naturalized US citizen (who) is himself an authentic American message to Asia" to validate the impartiality of academic inquiry in Peaceful War. Professor Patrick Mendis, who has been teaching at major US and Chinese universities, was born on the island of Sri Lanka but a naturalized American citizen living in the Washington, DC, area.

== Harvard analysis ==
In a scholarly assessment of Peaceful War, the Harvard International Review concludes:

This unprecedented and meticulously researched study of the evolving Sino-American relations is rich with implications. Mendis' look at China is timely, levelheaded, and fair above all else. As a scholar who has weaved effectively between education, writing, and diplomacy, Mendis has developed the rare ability to employ in-depth, historically accurate analogies that surprise and engage readers without approaching the faintest shade of exaggeration.

== China 100th anniversary in Minnesota ==
During his October–December 2013 book promotion and lecture tour in China, Mendis, a celebrated alumnus of the University of Minnesota, announced that he will donate after-tax profits from royalties of sales from the book to the university's Edward A. Burdick Legislative Award at the Humphrey School of Public Affairs. In 2012, Mendis established the award at his alma mater in honor and memory of his late mentor and friend who had a legendary public service record in the Minnesota House of Representatives. The Minnesota-trained American diplomat told the Beijing and Shanghai's distinguished alumni groups that this is his way of thanking Minnesota as the university celebrates its 100th anniversary of China relations.

Dr. Mendis was invited by China's most prestigious universities and academies, including Fudan, Peking, Nanjing, Sun Yat-sen, Tsinghua universities, and the Chinese Academy of Social Sciences. Veteran journalist Eyee Hsu of the Up Close program at the China Central Television (中国中央电视台) in Beijing interviewed him for global viewers.
