= Lists of Sri Lankan people =

This is a list of lists of notable individuals from Sri Lanka.

== General ==
- List of Sri Lankan Americans
- List of Sri Lankan Australians
- List of British Sri Lankans
- List of Sri Lankans by educational institution
- List of Sri Lankans by ethnicity
- List of Sri Lankans by sport
- List of Sri Lankan Canadians
- List of Sri Lankan Tamils

== By occupation ==
- List of Sri Lankan academics
- List of Sri Lankan activists
- List of Sri Lankan actors
- List of Sri Lankan architects
- List of Sri Lankan aviators
- List of Sri Lankan broadcasters
- List of Sri Lankan composers
- List of Sri Lankan engineers
- List of Sri Lankan film directors
- List of Sri Lankan journalists
- List of Sri Lankan judges
- List of Sri Lankan military personnel
- List of Sri Lankan monarchs
- List of Sri Lankan musicians
- List of Sri Lankan non-career diplomats
- List of Sri Lankan non-career Permanent Secretaries
- List of Sri Lankan politicians
  - List of presidents of Sri Lanka
  - List of prime ministers of Sri Lanka
- List of Sri Lankan writers

== See also ==
- List of people on stamps of Sri Lanka
