= Patrick Mendis =

American writer and academic

Patrick Mendis is an educator, diplomat, author, philanthropist, and executive in government service in the United States. A former US diplomat and military professor during the Clinton, Bush, and Obama administrations, he held various positions in the US Departments of Agriculture, Defense, Energy, and State. He was appointed twice as a commissioner of the US National Commission for UNESCO at the State Department by the Obama administration. His appointment to the UNESCO Commission ended during the Trump administration when the White House withdrew from the UN agency.

Mendis is currently a presidential advisor to the US National Security Education Board, an appointment by the Biden administration, as well as the inaugural Taiwan chair and distinguished visiting professor of international relations at the Jagiellonian University in Krakow, Poland.

A Taiwan fellow of the Ministry of Foreign Affairs of the Republic of China (ROC), Mendis served as a distinguished visiting professor of global affairs at the National Chengchi University and a senior fellow of the Taiwan Center for Security Studies in Taipei. Previously, he was a distinguished visiting professor of Sino-American relations at the Yenching Academy of Peking University in the People's Republic of China (PRC).

After serving as a Rajawali senior fellow at the Harvard Kennedy School of Government and a visiting professor of Peking University's School of International Studies, Mendis served as a distinguished visiting professor of Asian-Pacific affairs at Shandong University in China as well as an associate-in-research of the Fairbank Center for Chinese Studies at Harvard University. He is a fellow of the World Academy of Art and Science.

Mendis served as a distinguished senior fellow and affiliate professor of public and international affairs in the School of Public Policy at George Mason University. He is an adjunct professor of geography and geoinformation science at GMU.

Mendis taught MBA/MPA as well as international trade and American foreign policy courses at the University of Minnesota, University of Maryland, and Yale University before joining the U.S. Department of State, where he served under Secretary Madeleine Albright and General Colin Powell. In 2012, Secretary Hillary Clinton appointed Mendis as a commissioner to the US National Commission for UNESCO. He was reappointed by Secretary John Kerry. He has worked in, and traveled to, more than 130 countries, and visited every US state and every Chinese province.

Earlier in his life, Mendis worked at the Minnesota House of Representatives, the US Senate Foreign Relations Committee, the World Bank, and the United Nations. After his government service (in the Departments of Agriculture, Defense, Energy, and State), Mendis returned to academia, serving as vice president of the Osgood Center for International Studies and as a foreign policy visiting scholar at the Johns Hopkins University's Paul H. Nitze School of Advanced International Studies (SAIS) in Washington, D.C.

He is an alumnus of Harvard University's John F. Kennedy School of Government and the University of Minnesota's Hubert H. Humphrey School of Public Affairs. Mendis was elected to serve on the board of the Harvard Kennedy School (HKS) Alumni DC Council in Washington (2010–2014) and currently serves on the advisory board of the Harvard International Review. He has established the Edward Burdick Legislative Award at the Humphrey School and the Millennials Award for Leadership and Service at Harvard University.

Mendis has written more than 100 journal articles, government reports, and newspaper columns, and several books, including Peaceful War: How the Chinese Dream and the American Destiny Create a New Pacific World Order (2013), Commercial Providence: The Secret Destiny of the American Empire (2010), and TRADE for PEACE: How the DNA of America, Freemasonry, and Providence Created a New World Order with Nobody in Charge (2009).

== Early years in Sri Lanka and Minnesota ==
Patrick Mendis was born in the medieval capital of Polonnaruwa in Sri Lanka and grew up in Minnesota. In Sri Lanka, he was a Boy Scout, a Sarvodaya volunteer, a Police Cadets sergeant, and a commander of the Army Cadets Corps of Sri Lanka. Major General Milinda Peiris, the vice chancellor of the General Sir John Kotelawala Defence University (KDU), presented Mendis with the KDU Award recognizing his contribution to Sri Lanka. He also received the UNESCO Award by the United Nations Association of Sri Lanka.

At Sarvodaya, Mendis worked with his mentor, A. T. Ariyaratne, the "Gandhi of Sri Lanka" and founder of Sarvodaya, and later established several tsunami scholarships and the Sarvodaya Peace Prize. For his contributions, Mendis is recognized with the Sarvodaya International Peace Award and the Sri Lanka Foundation's Outstanding Leadership Award for International Diplomacy.

At 18, Mendis won one of the nine AFS scholarships among over 100,000 applicants in Sri Lanka and attended high school in Perham, Minnesota. After graduating from Perham High School in 1979, he traveled by bus to Washington, D.C., where he met President Jimmy Carter's vice president Walter Mondale and US senator Rudy Boschwitz, who remained friends and supporters of his.

After Mendis returned from the US, the Government of Sri Lanka offered him a scholarship to the University of Sri Jayewardenepura, where he served as vice president of the World University Service, president of the University Sports Council, and a member of the university's badminton, athletic, and swimming teams. He earned his BSc in business administration and economics (First Class Honours) in 1983, served as the "Youth Ambassador" of Sri Lanka at the first UN World Conference on the International Year of the Youth in New York in 1985, and later endowed two annual scholarships in leadership and management studies in 1993 at his university in Sri Lanka.

In 1983, Mendis returned to the United States on a Hubert Humphrey fellowship for graduate studies at the University of Minnesota's Hubert H. Humphrey School of Public Affairs. In Minnesota, he worked in the Minnesota House of Representatives with parliamentarian and chief clerk of the Minnesota House of Representatives, Honorable Edward A. Burdick. At the University of Minnesota, Mendis studied under the late NATO Ambassador Harlan Cleveland, the founding dean of the Hubert H. Humphrey School of Public Affairs and served as his special assistant when Cleveland became the president of the World Academy of Art and Science.

After earning his PhD in geography/applied economics at the University of Minnesota in 1989, Mendis served as a lecturer in international relations and a visiting scholar in agricultural and applied economics at the University of Minnesota from 1990 to 1997. During his tenure, Mendis worked with Regents Professor Vernon Ruttan and authored a book, Human Environment and Spatial Relations in Agricultural Production and four staff papers published by the University of Minnesota's Department of Applied Economics.

== International relations ==
With his legislative experience at the Minnesota House of Representatives (under Honorable Edward A. Burdick), he worked for Senator Rudy Boschwitz, serving on the staff of the U.S. Senate Foreign Relations Committee. Mendis was assigned to manage the Middle East and Asian issues and coordinate with President Ronald Reagan's White House.

Mendis then returned to Minnesota and graduated with his MA in international development and foreign affairs from the Hubert H. Humphrey School of Public Affairs in 1986 where he received the first Humphrey Alumni Award for Outstanding Leadership, along with former vice president Walter Mondale (under President Jimmy Carter), President Ronald Reagan's ambassador Max Kampelman, and UN Environment Programme's executive director Mustafa Tolba.

With Ambassador Jayantha Dhanapala, Mendis represented the Government of Sri Lanka as "Youth Ambassador" at the 1985 UN International Year of the Youth (IYY) in New York. It was a political appointment by the Government of Sri Lanka (at the suggestion of the late president Ranasinghe Premadasa) to honor Mendis's service at the University of Sri Jayewardenepura. Professor Karunasena Kodituwakku the vice chancellor of the university, recommended Mendis to the minister of youth and sports affairs, Ranil Wickramasinghe, who was the ex prime minister of Sri Lanka. (Mendis also worked at the World Bank and served as a consultant to the U.S. Department of State after representing the Government of Sri Lanka at the UN, where he received the UN Medal for the IYY).

In Minnesota (1986–96), Mendis served as the president of the Society for International Development, the vice president of the United Nations Association of the United States of America, a public speaker at the Minnesota International Center and the founding chairman of The Saint Paul Foundation's Asian-Pacific Endowment for Community Development.

In 1994, Ambassador Harlan Cleveland, the president of World Academy of Art and Science, appointed Mendis as an associate fellow of the academy. In the same year, he was elected as a member of the Saint Paul-Minneapolis Committee of the Council on Foreign Relations. In 2000, Mendis was elected as a fellow of the World Academy. He currently serves as an executive committee member of the Geneva-based World Network of Young Leaders and Entrepreneurs.

For his leadership and scholarship, he received the State of Minnesota's Asian-Pacific Heritage Award, the Minnesota Governor Rudy Perpich's Certificate of Honorary Citizenship, the Minnesota Governor Harold Stassen Award for United Nations Affairs, the University of Minnesota President's Leadership and Service Award, and the 21st Century Trust Fellowship to attend the Merton College at Oxford University in the United Kingdom. In 2013, he received the Alumnus of Notable Achievement Award from the University of Minnesota.

== Government and military service ==
After becoming a naturalized United States citizen, Mendis served as a military professor through the University of Maryland. He taught MBA/MPA and International Relations courses to American civil servants and defense forces in the NATO and Pacific Commands of the U.S. Department of Defense at every major in military bases in Germany, Italy, Japan, South Korea, Spain, Turkey, and the United Kingdom. For his outstanding commitment to teaching and service to Pentagon, Mendis received the university's most prestigious Stanley J. Drazek Teaching Excellence Award.

After completing his two teaching tours in Europe and Asia, Mendis joined the U.S. Department of State in 2000 as a foreign affairs officer to serve under Secretary Madeleine Albright in Washington, D.C. Under her direction, he served as the chairman of the U.S. Government Inter-agency Policy Working Group on Sustainable Development and the science & technology coordinator for the White House Office of Science and Technology Policy (OSTP) under President Bill Clinton. When General Colin Powell came to the State Department, Mendis was appointed as the secretariat director of the Bureau of Educational and Cultural Affairs (former U.S. Information Agency) and a special assistant to the Assistant Secretary of State for ECA under President George W. Bush. Mendis was also elected by both State and USAID civilian and foreign service employees to serve as the vice chairman of Secretary Colin Powell's Open Forum.

Later, Mendis was invited to participate as a consultant and economist in a multi-year science and national security project, headed by Ambassador Ronald Lehman, the director of the Center for Global Security Research at the U.S. Department of Energy's Lawrence Livermore National Laboratory. Ambassador Lehman and Professor Mendis worked on a number of national security projects, including one involving the late Sir Arthur C. Clarke, the science-fiction writer, who lived in Sri Lanka. Sir Clarke, a fellow of the World Academy of Art and Science, wrote the foreword for Mendis' book on Glocalization.

To transform the U.S. Government national security decision-making process in the 21st century, Patrick Mendis authored (with Leah Green) the U.S.-India Civil Nuclear Agreement case study for the Project on National Security Reform, a nonpartisan non-profit organization mandated by the United States Congress to recommend improvements to the U.S. national security system.

Mendis also served as an Uhuru 'Freedom' Fellow at the International Republican Institute (IRI) and the governing board of the USDA Graduate School, an appointment by the George W. Bush administration. He serves on the editorial board of The Public Manager.

== Visiting professor to China, Russia, and SAS ==
Through the University of Maryland's faculty exchange program in summer 2000, Professor Mendis taught courses in American government, English, and culture to Chinese students at the Northwestern Polytechnic University in Xian. Ever since, he has been invited to give lectures at over 25 universities and academies in more than 20 provinces throughout China, including Hong Kong, Macau, and Tibet. His appointments include distinguished visiting professorships at the China Foreign Affairs University in Beijing, Nanjing University, Tongji University in Shanghai, Wuhan University, and the Beijing Administrative College. The Center for International Strategic and Security Studies at the Guangdong University of Foreign Studies has appointed him as a consulting professor of international relations; Mendis currently serves as a distinguished visiting professor of international politics at Zhejiang University in Hangzhou. For more than five years, Professor Mendis served as an international adviser to The Encyclopedia of Sri Lankan Diaspora at the National University of Singapore and authored the chapter on the United States.

While at the University of Minnesota, he also led the U.S. team selected to teach market economics and management to a group of former KGB officers, young Russian entrepreneurs, and faculty members at Saint Petersburg State University (previously known as Leningrad State University in the former Soviet Union). During the historic 1991 summer in the former Soviet Union, Professor Mendis also lectured at the Moscow State University and toured the Kremlin and the Russian White House in Moscow.

As a visiting professor of economics and public policy at the University of Pittsburgh's Semester at Sea (SAS) program, Professor Mendis traveled to the Caribbean, Latin America, Africa and Asia. Based on his first-hand observations of globalization and Americanization, he authored a series of articles, which later expanded into a book, the Human Side of Globalization, in which he explained his experience in meeting with Fidel Castro of Cuba in 2004.

== Philanthropic and global-giving activities ==
Mendis raised funds for a number of tsunami projects in Sri Lanka, working with the Embassy of Sri Lanka and the Harvard University Club of Washington, D.C. He established a range of tsunami scholarships, a micro-loan program, and a peace prize in Sri Lanka in collaboration with the Calvert Foundation in Maryland.

Proceeds from the sales of his previous two books, Human Side of Globalization and TRADE for PEACE, are donated to establish scholarships and a peace prize in Sri Lanka and a number of microloan projects through Kiva.org in more than 30 countries in Africa, Asia, and Latin America. Through his book Commercial Providence, Mendis contributed additional funds for his philanthropic activities. In honor and memory of his late mentor and friend Edward A. Burdick, the annual Edward Burdick Legislative Award was established at the University of Minnesota's Hubert Humphrey School of Public Affairs. During his 2013 China book tour for Peaceful War, Mendis announced at the Beijing Office of the University of Minnesota that he will donate the book proceeds after tax to the Humphrey School. The University of Minnesota honored him with the Alumnus of Notable Achievements Award in 2013.

== Bibliography ==
=== Books ===
- Peaceful War: How the Chinese Dream and the American Destiny Create a Pacific New World Order (2013) ISBN 978-0-7618-6186-7
- Commercial Providence: The Secret Destiny of the American Empire (2010) ISBN 978-0-7618-5244-5
- Trade for Peace (2009) ISBN 978-1440115462
- Glocalization (2007) ISBN 9781430306337

=== Articles ===
- "How Washington's Asia Pivot and the TPP Can Benefit Sino-American Relations," Australian National University's East Asia Forum, March 6, 2013.
- "China's Buddhist Diplomacy: Why do America and India Entangle with Tiny Sri Lanka?," Columbia University's Journal of International Affairs, Spring, 2013.
- "What Does the "Chinese Dream" Really Mean?," Hong Kong's South China Morning Post, March 14, 2013.
- "The Sri Lankan Silk Road: The Potential War Between China and the United States," Harvard University's Harvard International Review, November 30, 2012.
- "Chinese Renaissance Man is Touched by America’s Heartland," Minnesota (USA) MinnPost, November 8, 2012.
- "Destiny of the Pearl: How Sri Lanka's Colombo Censensus Trumpted Beijing and Washington in the Indian Ocean," Yale University's Yale Journal of International Affairs, October 18, 2012.
- "China-bashing Rhetoric Like Romney's Counterproductive," Minnesota (USA) MinnPost, October 23, 2012.
- "Government-wide Collaboration Boots National Trade," United States Public Manager, Spring 2010.
