= List of Sri Lankan Canadians =

This is a list of Sri Lankan Canadians, including both original immigrants who obtained Canadian citizenship and their Canadian descendants, but not Sri Lankan nationals living or working in Canada. The list includes a brief description of their reason for notability.

== Academics ==
- Randy Boyagoda – principal of University of St. Michael's College, Toronto, writer
- Chandre Dharma-wardana – principal research scientist at the National Research Council of Canada
- Ray Jayawardhana – astronomer at the University of Toronto
- Chelva Kanaganayakam – professor at the University of Toronto
- Lakshman Marasinghe – academic and lawyer
- Janaka Ruwanpura – Director of the Centre for Project Management Excellence at the Schulich School of Engineering at University of Calgary
- Indira Samarasekera – President and 12th Vice-Chancellor of the University of Alberta

== Activists ==
- Cheryl Perera – children's rights activist, founder of OneChild

== Business ==
- Christopher Ondaatje – former athlete and philanthropist
- Chamath Palihapitiya – venture capitalist, software developer
- Eric Rajah – humanitarian, A Better World founder, Alberta Order of Excellence
- Kamaj Silva – entrepreneur, founder and CEO of Sneakertub and MILK Toronto

== Film and entertainment ==
- Rohan Fernando – visual artist, painter and filmmaker
- Suresh Joachim – actor, producer and multiple Guinness World Record holder
- Pardis Parker – director, writer, actor, and comedian
- Maitreyi Ramakrishnan – actress
- Lenin M. Sivam – filmmaker
- Rajiv Surendra – actor

== Journalists ==
- Anne-Marie Mediwake – news anchor
- Radheyan Simonpillai – journalist

== Musicians ==
- Nirmala Basnayake – musician in the band controller.controller

== Politics and law ==
- Gary Anandasangaree – Canadian Member of Parliament for Scarborough—Rouge Park
- Logan Kanapathi – Markham City Councillor for Ward 7
- Rathika Sitsabaiesan – former Canadian Member of Parliament for Scarborough-Rouge River
- Vijay Thanigasalam – Member of the Ontario Provincial Parliament (MPP) for Scarborough—Rouge Park
- Asoka Weerasinghe – former Deputy High Commissioner for Sri Lanka in Canada

== Rebels ==
- Kumaravelu Vignarajah – LTTE cadre

== Sports people ==
- Trevin Bastiampillai – Canadian cricketer
- Manoj David – Canadian cricketer
- Ruvindu Gunasekera – Canadian cricketer
- Rohan Jayasekera – Sri Lankan and Canadian cricketer
- Arvind Kandappah – Canadian cricketer
- Ravishankar Puvendran – Canadian cricketer
- Sanjayan Thuraisingam – Canadian cricketer

== Writers ==
- Sumathy Balaram – screenwriter and film director
- Rienzi Crusz – poet
- Siri Gunasinghe – Sinhalese poet, novelist, literary critic
- Suvendrini Lena – playwright and neurologist
- Michael Ondaatje – poet and author of numerous novels, including The English Patient
- Leah Lakshmi Piepzna-Samarasinha – poet, writer, educator and social activist
- Shyam Selvadurai – novelist

== See also ==
- List of Sri Lankans
