= Galle Fort Post Office =

Post office in Sri Lanka

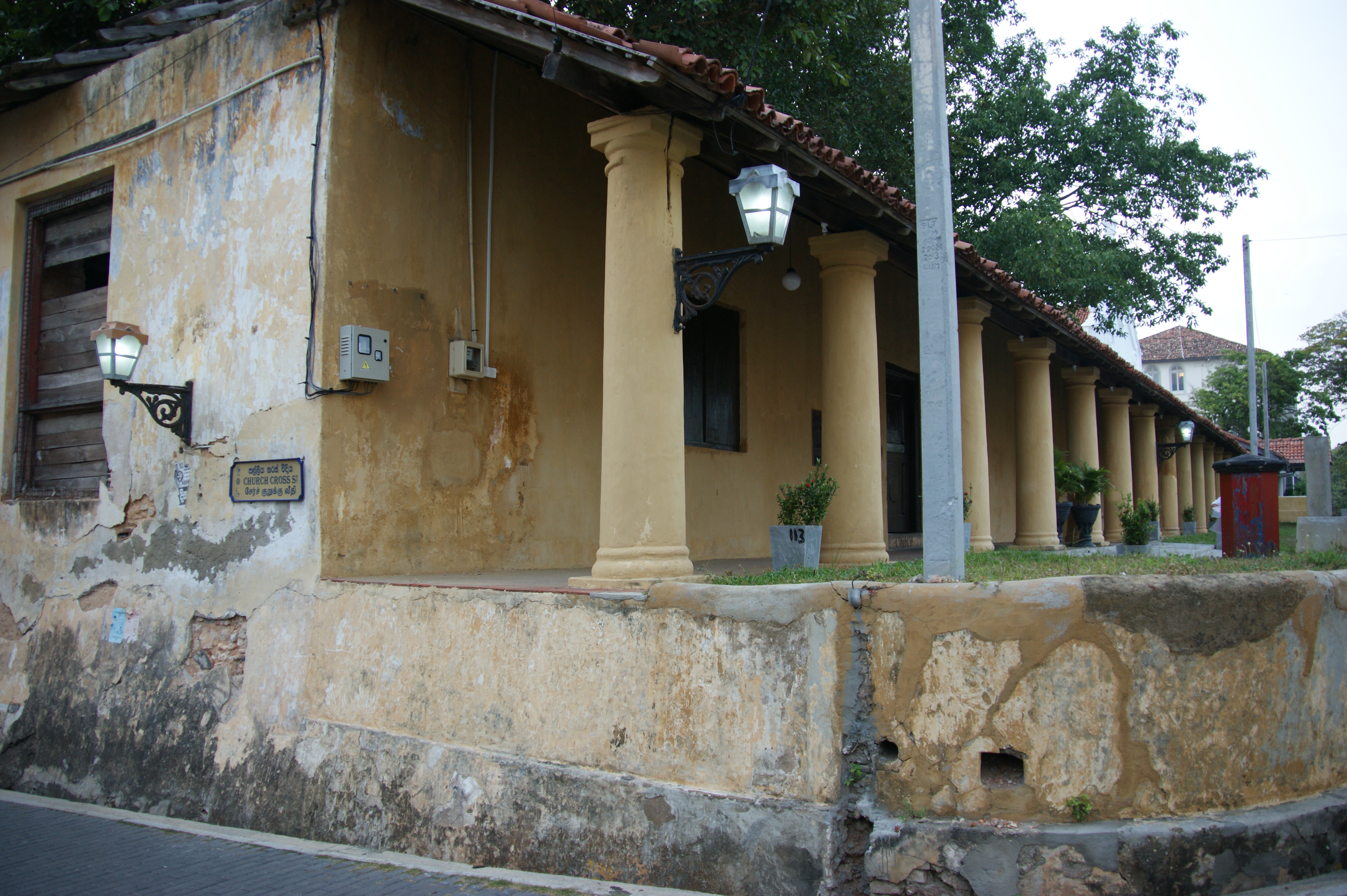
- Galle Fort Post Office (2014)
- Interactive map of the Galle Fort Post Office area

General information
- Location: Church Street, Galle Fort, Galle, Sri Lanka
- Coordinates: 6.027733°N 80.217377°E
- Client: Sri Lanka Post

The Galle Fort Post Office is the post office in Galle Fort, Sri Lanka.

The first post office was located at 92 Pedlar Street (originally known as Moor Street) and opened in 1820, under the direction of the Postmaster General of Ceylon, Lewis Sansoni. It was one of the five first post offices opened in the colony by the British. The first mail coach service, between Colombo and Galle, began operations on 2 July 1832. A two-horse coach would leave Galle at 6:00am and arrive in Colombo at 4:30pm. The night mail left Galle at 6:00pm and had to be un-harnessed and ferried across rivers at Gintota, Bentota and Kalutura.

The post office was relocated to its current location on the corner of Church and Church Cross Streets in 1872. This building was constructed during the Dutch occupation and in 1868 was the Dutch Governor's official residence. In 1744, the building was used as the official residence of the chief clerk and the adjoining building, which was built in a similar architectural style, was the Administrator's residence. It was later used as the Trade Office (Negotie Kantoor) of the Dutch East India Company (VOC) and by 1760, 18 book-keepers and 18 clerks were working in the building. When the British took control of the country and the fort, the two buildings were amalgamated, with part of the building used as the official residence of the Military Commander of the Galle Fort. The Commissariat Store was also housed in a part of the same building. The building was then used as the Telegraph Office in 1857 before becoming the General Post Office for Galle.

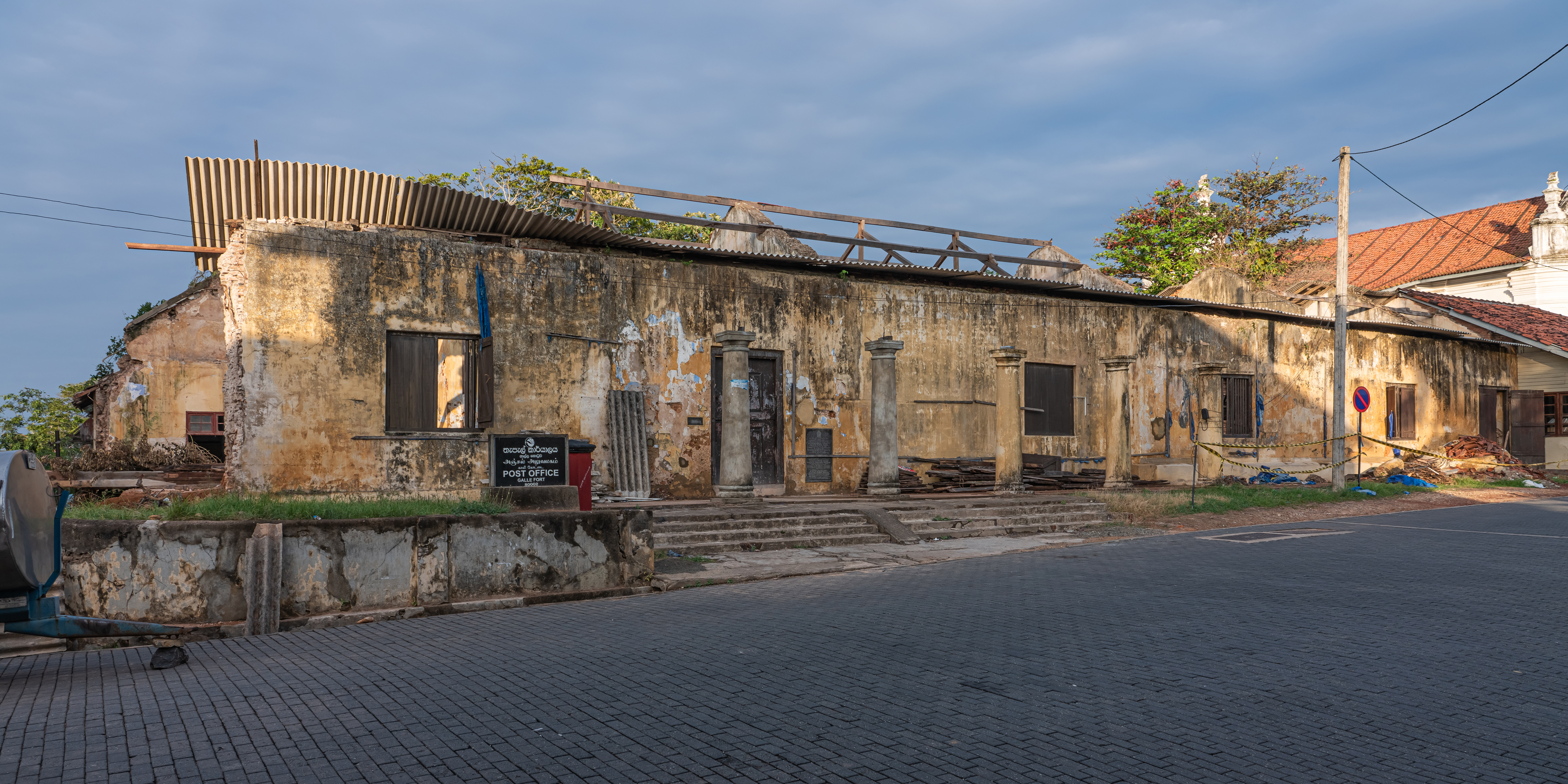
Galle Fort Post Office facade from Church Street (2020)

The post office is a single-storey building constructed from cabook (coral stone), with a lime and sand render, and traditional half-round terracotta roof tiles. It has a portico which runs the length of the building's street frontage, with six stone pillars supporting the portico roof. The post office only occupies a small portion of the building with the rest being vacant and disused.

The post office building was gazetted as an Archeological Protected Monument in 1974 and in 1988, UNESCO declared Galle Fort a World Heritage Site.

In 1998 the building was renovated by the Department of Archaeology and in 2007 by the Central Cultural Fund. In 2015 the Postal Department undertook further renovations.

In June 2017 the United Postal Trade Union went on a three-day strike in order to stop the government's plans to sell the Nuwara Eliya, Kandy and Galle Fort post offices to private developers, in order for the buildings be converted into hotels. In August the Cabinet Committee on Economic Management (CCEM) directed that the building be transferred to the Galle Heritage Foundation, with proposals to be sought from prospective parties for the renovation of the building, in accordance with the conservation principles stipulated by UNESCO and the Galle Heritage Foundation. The renovated building to include the provision for a continuation of the current postal services.

In April 2019 Sri Lanka Post were forced to move the post office, following the collapse of one of the building's walls. On the night of 7 December 2019 a significant portion of the building collapsed onto Cross Church Street blocking the road. The Galle District Assistant Archeological Commissioner said "the roof of the edifice was in a severe state of dilapidation as the rain water had seeped into the huge walls of the building." According to the Galle Heritage Foundation the full restoration of the building would cost around Rs. 60 million.

== See also ==
- Other General Post Offices
- Sri Lanka Post
