= D. J. Wimalasurendra =

Sri Lankan engineer and statesman (1874–1953)

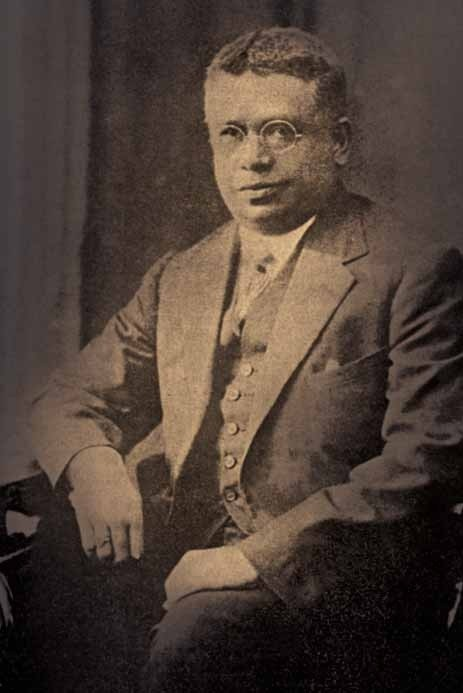
- Born: 17 September 1874; Galle, Ceylon
- Died: 10 August 1953 (aged 78); Ceylon
- Education: Ananda College, Maradana College of Technology, Faraday House
- Occupations: Engineer and Statesman

Devapura Jayasena Wimalasurendra (17 September 1874 – 10 August 1953) was a Sri Lankan [Buddhist Sinhalese] engineer and statesman. He played a prominent role in the establishment of hydropower in Sri Lanka and is known as the "Father of Hydropower" and was a member of the State Council of Ceylon.

Born in 1874 in Galle, as the eldest son of master craftsman Mudaliyar Don Juan Wimalasurendra, He received his education at Ananda College, Colombo and joined the Ceylon Technical College in 1893, while working as an apprentice at the Government Factory. He graduated in Civil Engineering from the Ceylon Technical College and gain Associate Membership of the Institution of Civil Engineers (AMICE). In 1912, Wimalasurendra attended Faraday House in Stevenage, England specializing in electrical engineering and gaining the Faraday House Diploma in seven months, also gaining Associate Membership of the Institution of Electrical Engineers in Britain.

In 1896 he joined the Public Works Department as a field overseer, and was promoted to an Inspector within four years. Having become a Junior Assistant Engineer by 1900, he worked on building the concentration camp in Diyatalawa for Boer prisoners captured in the Second Boer War; in 1901 he conducted a survey on mineral deposits in the Kelani Valley.

Having had his initial proposals on hydro power ignored by the Engineering Association of Ceylon he constructed the first small hydro power station in Ceylon, at Blackpool, between Nanu Oya and Nuwara Eliya, to supply electricity to the town of Nuwara Eliya. In 1918 he submitted a paper to the Engineering Association of Ceylon titled "Economics of Hydro Power Utilization in Ceylon"; in it he proposed the possibility of hydro power from Maskelioya and Kehelgamuoya, capable of lighting 100,000 lamps (114.5 MW). He also introduced the concept of developing a national grid.

Only in 1923 did the colonial government undertake the development of hydro power in Ceylon, but Wimalasurendra was left out of the project and left the country on leave to England. He returned only on the request of the Colonial Secretary.

In 1926 he was appointed Chief Engineer of the Public Works Department (PWD). Soon after he began the separation of the electrical section of the PWD. To this end under his direction the government took over the Colombo Electric Scheme (established in 1918) to supply power to the Colombo city and the tramways run by Bousteads Brothers Ltd. He became the Deputy Director of the newly formed Department of Government Electrical Undertakings (DGEU) in 1927, and established the first thermal power station in 1929, Stanley Power House. Having his projects undermined, he retired early from public service in 1929.

When engineer D. J. Wimalasurendra was sent to Aberdeen Laxapana falls by the British government in order to discover gold, he saw the possibility of hydropower generation. When the proposal of hydropower generation in Ceylon was presented to the British government, Wimalasurendra had to face strong rejections. But Wimalasurendra, who was further encouraged by the subjugation, continued researching on the subject aided by his own funds and eventually presented the research paper titled "Economics of Hydro Power Utilization in Ceylon" to the Engineering Association of Ceylon in 1918. National patriots and journalists joined D. J. Wimalasurendra and protested requesting the government to execute the hydropower generation project. As a result, in 1924, Laxapana Hydro Power Scheme was commenced, but shortly stopped due to weak government patronage.

But D. J. Wimalasurendra, who was not discouraged, retired from service at the age of fifty and contested in the national election, to be elected to the State Council of Ceylon in 1931 in order to resume the stopped Laxapana Hydro Power Scheme. As a result, in 1950, Laxapana Hydro Power Scheme was successfully completed, paving way for many hydropower schemes that eventually made Ceylon, self-sufficient in electricity while strengthening the economy.

D.J. Wimalasurendra the founding father of hydroelectricity in Sri Lanka Great sons of Galle - Article Publish on The Island News Paper (30/07/2020)

== Early life and education ==
Born in 1874 in Galle, as the eldest son of master craftsman Mudaliyar Don Juan Wimalasurendra, He received his education at Ananda College, Colombo and joined the Ceylon Technical College in 1893, while working as an apprentice at the Government Factory. He graduated in Civil Engineering from the Ceylon Technical College and gain Associate Membership of the Institution of Civil Engineers (AMICE). In 1912, Wimalasurendra attended Faraday House in Stevenage, England specializing in electrical engineering and gaining the Faraday House Diploma in seven months, also gaining Associate Membership of the Institution of Electrical Engineers in Britain.

== Engineering career ==
In 1896 he joined the Public Works Department as a field overseer, and was promoted to an Inspector within four years. Having become a Junior Assistant Engineer by 1900, he worked on building the concentration camp in Diyatalawa for Boer prisoners captured in the Second Boer War; in 1901 he conducted a survey on mineral deposits in the Kelani Valley.

Having had his initial proposals on hydro power ignored by the Engineering Association of Ceylon he constructed the first small hydro power station in Ceylon, at Blackpool, between Nanu Oya and Nuwara Eliya, to supply electricity to the town of Nuwara Eliya. In 1918 he submitted a paper to the Engineering Association of Ceylon titled "Economics of Hydro Power Utilization in Ceylon"; in it he proposed the possibility of hydro power from Maskelioya and Kehelgamuoya, capable of lighting 100,000 lamps (114.5 MW). He also introduced the concept of developing a national grid.

Only in 1923 did the colonial government undertake the development of hydro power in Ceylon, but Wimalasurendra was left out of the project and left the country on leave to England. He returned only on the request of the Colonial Secretary.

In 1926 he was appointed Chief Engineer of the Public Works Department (PWD). Soon after he began the separation of the electrical section of the PWD. To this end under his direction the government took over the Colombo Electric Scheme (established in 1918) to supply power to the Colombo city and the tramways run by Bousteads Brothers Ltd. He became the Deputy Director of the newly formed Department of Government Electrical Undertakings (DGEU) in 1927, and established the first thermal power station in 1929, Stanley Power House. Having his projects undermined, he retired early from public service in 1929.

== Role in hydropower generation ==
When engineer D. J. Wimalasurendra was sent to Aberdeen Laxapana falls by the British government in order to discover gold, he saw the possibility of hydropower generation. When the proposal of hydropower generation in Ceylon was presented to the British government, Wimalasurendra had to face strong rejections. But Wimalasurendra, who was further encouraged by the subjugation, continued researching on the subject aided by his own funds and eventually presented the research paper titled "Economics of Hydro Power Utilization in Ceylon" to the Engineering Association of Ceylon in 1918. National patriots and journalists joined D. J. Wimalasurendra and protested requesting the government to execute the hydropower generation project. As a result, in 1924, Laxapana Hydro Power Scheme was commenced, but shortly stopped due to weak government patronage.

But D. J. Wimalasurendra, who was not discouraged, retired from service at the age of fifty and contested in the national election, to be elected to the State Council of Ceylon in 1931 in order to resume the stopped Laxapana Hydro Power Scheme. As a result, in 1950, Laxapana Hydro Power Scheme was successfully completed, paving way for many hydropower schemes that eventually made Ceylon, self-sufficient in electricity while strengthening the economy.

== Political career ==
In 1931 he was elected to the State Council of Ceylon from Ratnapura, he held the seat for four and a half years and served in the Executive Committee of Works and Communication. He lobbied for the resumption of work on hydro power that was left uncompleted. As a result, the Laxapana Hydro Power Scheme, of which work had started in 1924 and stopped was resumed in 1938 and completed in 1950.

In 1933 he proposed the formation of a Central Electricity Authority. In 1935, the State Council passed the "Electricity Board Establishment Ordinance No. 38 of 1935, however the Board was dissolved in 1937 and the DGEU re-established.

== Legacy ==
Wimalasurendra is known as the "Father of Hydropower" in Sri Lanka. The Wimalasurendra Hydroelectric Power Plant in Nortan Bridge, Nuwara Eliya and the Wimalasurendra Power House at Laxapana were named in his memory.

He died on 10 August 1953.

In 1975, the Sri Lanka Post issued a stamp with his image.

== See also ==
- List of people on stamps of Sri Lanka
