= Postage stamps and postal history of Sri Lanka =

This is a survey of the postage stamps and postal history of Sri Lanka, formerly known as Ceylon.

Sri Lanka is an island country in South Asia, located about 31 km off the southern coast of India. After over two thousand years of rule by local kingdoms, parts of Sri Lanka were colonized by Portugal and the Netherlands beginning in the 16th century, before control of the entire country passed to Britain in 1815. A nationalist political movement arose in the country in the early 20th century with the aim of obtaining political independence, which was eventually granted by the British after peaceful negotiations in 1948. The country became a republic and adopted its current name in 1972.

== British colonial stamps ==
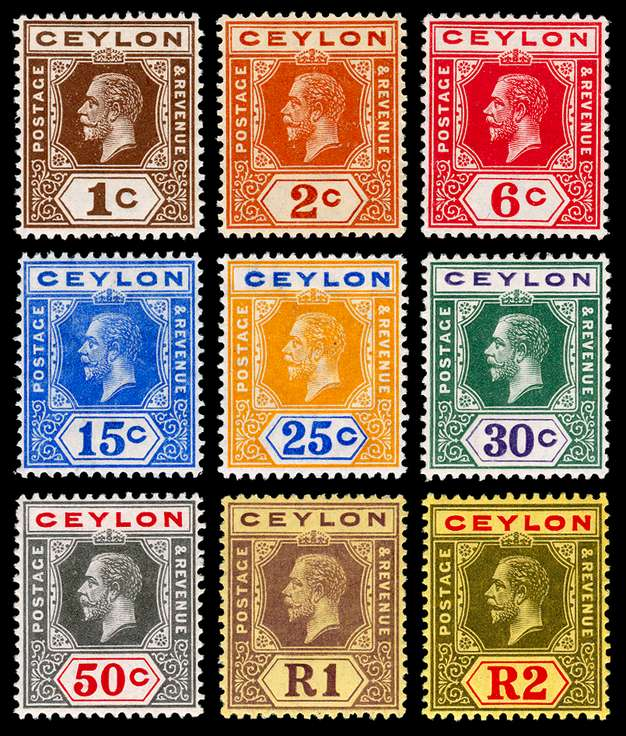
Mint British stamps for use in Ceylon depicting King George V

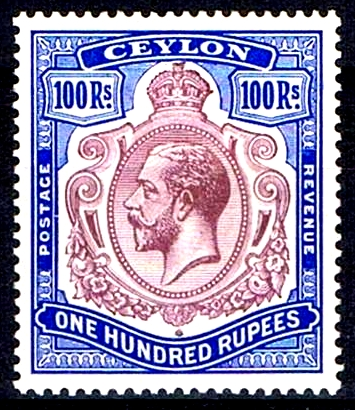
A mint high value 100 Rupee key type stamp of Ceylon

The first stamps for British Ceylon were issued on 1 April 1857. The stamp features a portrait of Queen Victoria and is brown in colour. It is a 6 pence value used to send a half ounce letter from Ceylon to England. Eight more stamps were issued in year 1857, all featuring the portrait of Queen Victoria. One of the five stamps that were issued on 23 April 1859 is considered to be the most valuable stamp in Sri Lanka: it is a 4 pence with a dark pink colour known as the 'Dull Rose'.

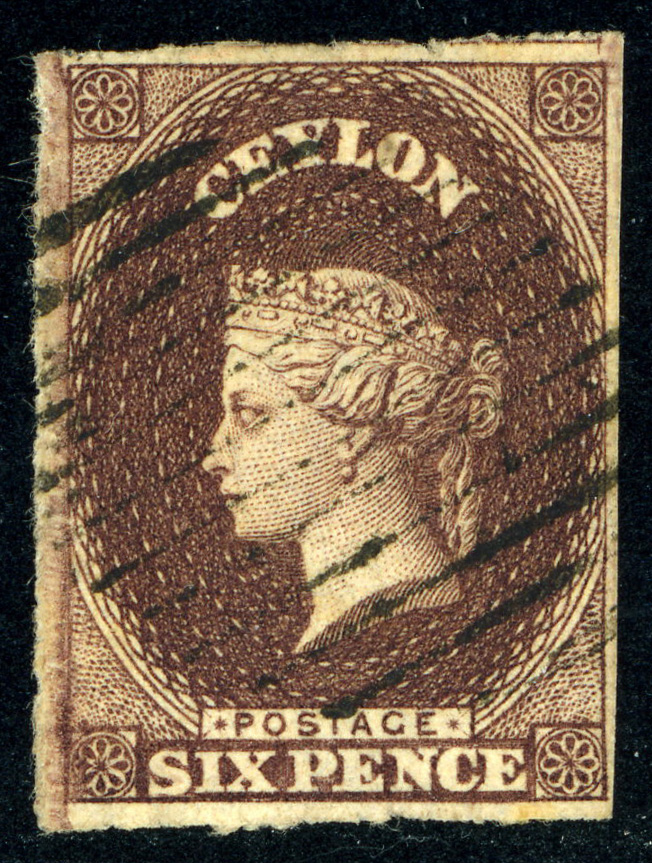
1857 Victoria on 6 pence

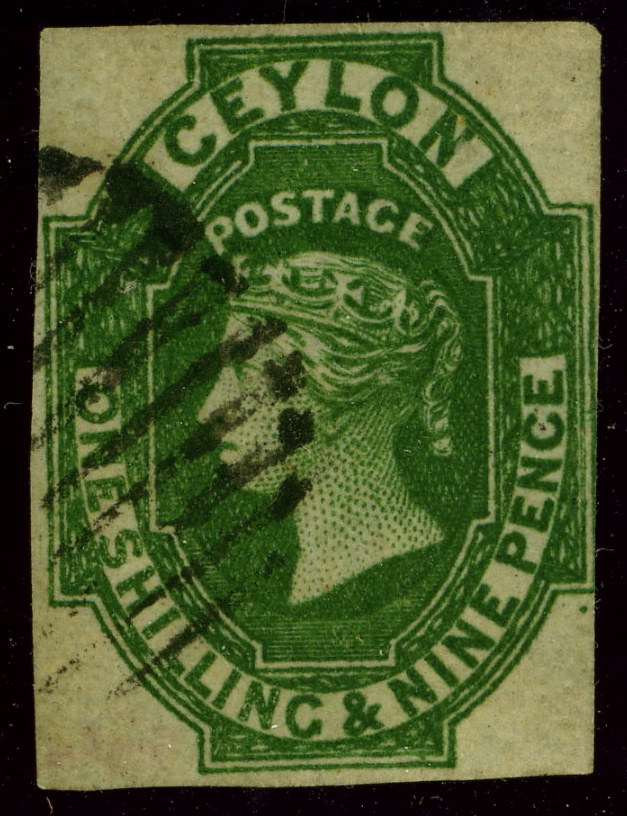
1859 Victoria on 1 sh 9 p - Cert. B.P.A.

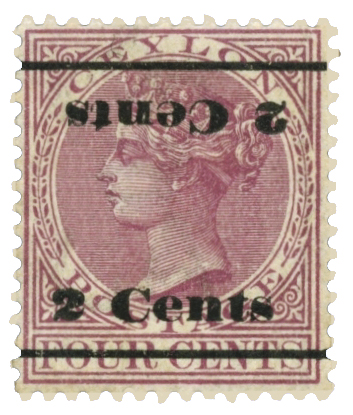
1888 Double Inverted Surcharge

== Stamps of Sri Lanka ==
Sri Lanka is one of the few countries to include details in a stamp in three languages viz. Sinhala, Tamil and English. The first stamps marked Sri Lanka were issued on 22 May 1972.

=== Souvenir sheets ===
Sri Lanka has been issuing souvenir sheets since 1966. Many of the earliest souvenir sheets issued by Sri Lanka are valuable. Sri Lanka issues souvenir sheets each year on many different themes.

==== First souvenir sheet ====
The first souvenir sheet of Sri Lanka was issued on 5 February 1966 on the topic 'Typical Birds of Ceylon' and was imperforate. This sheet was reissued on 15 September 1967 to commemorate the 1st National Stamp Exhibition of Sri Lanka, overprinted 'FIRST NATIONAL STAMP EXHIBITION 1967'. Subsequently many souvenir sheets were issued, on many themes mostly perforate.

==== Other souvenir sheets ====
On 10 February 1981, a four stamp Surcharged souvenir sheet on 'Quadrupeds of Sri Lanka' was issued. The four stamps in the sheet were surcharged at the issue.

A practice of issuing souvenir sheets containing the Wesak stamps started from year 1981.

On 21 October 1981 a souvenir sheet was issued to mark the Sri Lankan visit of Queen Elizabeth and was the first souvenir sheet issued to mark the visit of a distinguished foreign head of state.

On 2 December 1982 a souvenir sheet was issued to commemorate the 125th anniversary of the first postage Stamp of Sri Lanka. This was the first souvenir sheet of two stamps of different denominations: 50 cents and 2.50 rupees with a sheet value of Rs. 5.

On 1 April 2007 to commemorate the 150th anniversary of the first postage stamp of Sri Lanka a souvenir sheet was issued in both perforate and imperforate types.

All the souvenir sheets issued so far were rectangular in shape. The first irregular shape souvenir sheet was issued on 22 May 2001 on 'Seashells of Sri Lanka' for the World Biodiversity Day. The sheet was in the shape of a seashell.

==== Present-day souvenir sheets ====
Now, Sri Lanka issues several souvenir sheets annually. A souvenir sheet is almost always issued with Wesak and Christmas stamps. Sometimes, choosing one stamp from a set of stamps, a small miniature sheet, containing that single stamp is issued. Because they are attractive, they have become favourites among collectors.

==== World's longest stamp ====
On August 20, 2024, Sri Lanka's Postal Department issued the world's longest stamp(2nd longest as at December 31, 2024), measuring 205 millimetres (8.1 in), to commemorate the Kandy Esala Perahera festival in Kandy. The stamp has a value of Rs. 500.

== See also ==
- General Post Office, Colombo
- List of people on stamps of Sri Lanka
- Post and Telegraph Signals
- Sri Lanka Post
- Postal museum, Colombo
