= Post and Telegraph Signals =

Ceylon Post and Telegraph Signals Corps
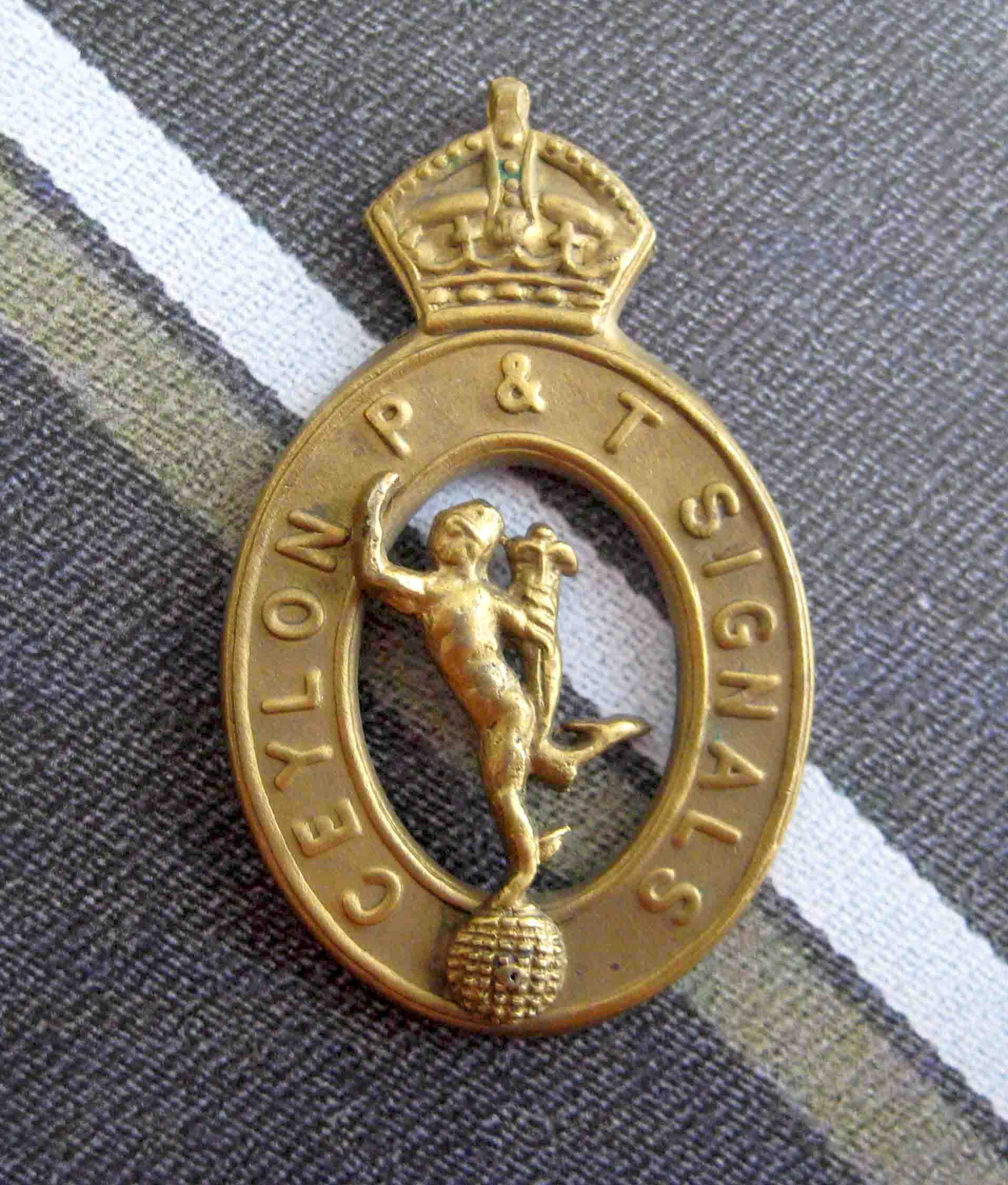
- Ceylon Post & Telegraph Signals 1943-45
- Active: 1943 - 1945, 1955 - 1956
- Country: Ceylon
- Branch: Ceylon Defense Force, Ceylon Army
- Role: Communication

Ceylon Post and Telegraph Signals Corps was a departmental corps of the Ceylon Defense Force from 1943 to 1945 and of the Ceylon Volunteer Force 1955 to 1956. It was formed in February 1946, from the Post and Telegraph Signals Unit of the Ceylon Engineers Corps. It was disbanded following the disbanding of the Ceylon Defence Force on 11 April 1949 and formation of the Ceylon Army by Army Act No. 17 of 1949 which revoked the Ceylon Defence Force Ordinance of 1910. The corps was reformed in 1955 with staff from the Department of Post and Ceylon Telegraph Department. The government hoped to minimized the effects to the Post and Telegraph services in the event of trade union action (strikes were common) by mobilizing the personnel attached to this unit. However it was disbanded in 1956 when the leftist S.W.R.D. Bandaranaike became prime minister.

== See also ==
- General Post Office, Colombo
- Postage stamps and postal history of Sri Lanka
- Sri Lanka Post
