= Vignarajah =

Vignarajah is a given name. Notable people with the name include:

- K. Vignarajah, Sri Lankan politician
- Krish O'Mara Vignarajah, American immigration and refugee advocate
- Kumaravelu Vignarajah, Sri Lankan spy and member of Liberation Tigers of Tamil Eelam
- Thiruvendran Vignarajah (born 1976), American attorney and politician
