= Former General Post Office, Colombo =

Protected monument in Sri Lanka

Former Colombo General Post Office
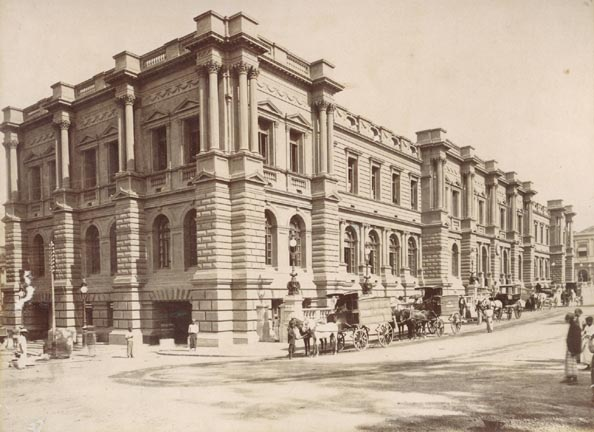
- The General Post Office – Janadhipathi Mawatha (President's Street), Colombo Fort (c. 1900)
- Interactive map of the Former Colombo General Post Office area

General information
- Type: Government office
- Architectural style: Edwardian
- Location: 17 Janadhipathi Mawatha, Colombo Fort, Colombo, Sri Lanka
- Coordinates: 6.9359°N 79.8434°E
- Current tenants: vacant
- Construction started: 29 August 1891
- Completed: July 1895
- Cost: Rs. 372,961.65 (1895)
- Client: Ceylon Post and Telecommunications Department (Sri Lanka Post)

Technical details
- Floor count: 2
- Floor area: 1,721 m^{2} (18,524.7 sq ft)

Design and construction
- Architect: Herbert Frederick Tomalin
- Architecture firm: Public Works Department
- Main contractor: Arasi Marikar Wapchi Marikar

The former Colombo General Post Office (abbreviated: GPO), at 17 Janadhipathi Mawatha, Colombo Fort, was the headquarters of the Sri Lanka Post and the office of the Postmaster General for over one hundred years, from 1895 until 2000.

== History ==
The first permanent post office in the country was established by the British in Colombo in 1882, when the country was a crown colony. It was housed in several different locations until the construction of the General Post Office building at 17 Kings Street (now known as Janadhipathi Mawatha), Colombo Fort, opposite the-then Governor's residence at King's House (now the President's House) in 1895. The site, bounded by Kings Street, Prince Street (now Srimath Baron Jayathilake), Baille Street (now Mudalige Mawatha), was a former rock quarry. The building was designed by Herbert Frederick Tomalin of the Public Works Department and built by Arasi Marikar Wapchi Marikar. Tomalin (1852–1944) was an English engineer/architect, who migrated to Ceylon in June 1886 to take up a position in the Ceylon Civil Service. His first position was as a District Engineer however as a result of his involvement in a number of government buildings in Colombo and his architectural qualifications he was entrusted with the job of designing and supervising the construction of the GPO. In 1922 he returned to England. Marikar (1829–1925), a local mason/builder and the paternal grandfather of Sir Razik Fareed, constructed a number of landmark buildings in Colombo, including the National Museum of Colombo, Colombo Fort Clock Tower, former Colombo Town Hall, Galle Face Hotel and Colombo Customs building.

Construction commenced on this two-storey Edwardian style building, with the official laying of the foundation stone on 29 August 1891 and was not completed until July 1895, although partial occupation of the building occurred in January that year. The cost of construction was Rs. 372,961.65 (Rs. 160,000 over the original construction budget) with the steelwork fabricated by Walker Sons and Company and the granite sourced from quarries in Ruwanwella and Ratnapura. It took a workforce of 375, including 180 specialist craftsmen, almost five years to build. The building was constructed in a typical Colonial renaissance architectural style, with its 775 m^{2} (8,340 sq ft) basement designed along Doric lines, the 1,721 m^{2} (18,520 sq ft) ground floor incorporating Ionic architecture whilst the matching upper floor features Corinthan influences. The main entrance stairs lead into a public hall, the floor of which was laid with multi-coloured intaglio tiles, the escalier at the rear of the hall was finished with polished granite and the plaster ceiling had papier-maché enrichments. The ground floor contained the parcel and postage stamp counters, the money order and savings bank counters, the registration and poste restante counters. The offices of the Postmaster-General, Superintendent of Telegraphs and the Resident Postmaster's quarters were located on the second floor, together with the Telegraph Department and Telephone Exchange.

The building served not only as the post office but also as the country's first telegraph and telephone exchanges, the Ceylon Post and Telecommunications Department having acquired the Oriental Telephone Company in January 1896 for a sum of Rs. 42,666. The first public telephone booth in the country was installed in the GPO on 16 August 1909.

On 21 January 2000 the building was formally recognised by the Government as an archaeological protected monument in Sri Lanka.

The GPO was moved in May 2000, for security reasons during the Civil War to the current Sri Lanka Post headquarters, a modern nine storey building, at 10 D. R. Wijewardene Mawatha (formerly McCallum Road), which also hosts the Postal Museum. Sri Lanka Post was only given 24 hours to vacate the building, which was then occupied by the Presidential Security Division.

The building was used to stage the fourth annual Colomboscope, a multi-disciplinary arts festival in August 2016. The event featured installations from Sri Lankan and International artists and performers.

In June 2017 the United Postal Trade Union went on a three-day strike in order to stop the government's plans to sell the Nuwara Eliya, Kandy and Galle Fort post offices to private developers, and seek the re-location of the Colombo General Post Office back to its original building in Colombo Fort. The strike was called off following written assurances being provided by the Government that they would address the union's concerns.

== See also ==
- Postage stamps and postal history of Sri Lanka
- Other General Post Offices
- Sri Lanka Post
