= List of Sri Lankan architects =

The following is a list of architects with a strong connection to the country of Sri Lanka (i.e., born in Sri Lanka, located in Sri Lanka or known primarily for their work in Sri Lanka).

== A–M ==
- Cecil Balmond (born 1943)
- Geoffrey Bawa (1919–2003)
- Homi Billimoria (died 1956)
- Minnette De Silva (1918–1998)
- Lal Dharmapriya Gamage (born 1954)
- Valentine Gunasekara (1931–2017)

== N–Z ==
- Ulrik Plesner (1861–1933)
- Justin Samarasekera (1916–2003)
- Oliver Weerasinghe (1907–1980)

== See also ==
- Architecture of Sri Lanka
- List of architects
- List of Sri Lankan people
