= List of Sri Lankans by ethnicity =

The following is a list of Sri Lankans by ethnicity.

== See also ==
- List of Sri Lankan people
