= List of Sri Lankan Australians =

This is a list of Sri Lankan Australians, people who are of Sri Lankan heritage living in Australia. "Sri Lankan Australians" refers to all ethnic groups in Sri Lanka, but they are mainly the Sinhalese, Sri Lankan Tamils and Burghers.

== Academics ==
- Christie Jayaratnam Eliezer – academic
- Sisira Jayasuriya – professor of economics at La Trobe University
- Michael Muthukrishna – professor of psychological sciences at London School of Economics
- Christopher Weeramantry – Emeritus Professor at Monash University
- Mahinda Vilathgamuwa – Professor of Electrical Engineering and Computer Science, Queensland University of Technology

== Authors ==
- Michelle de Kretser – author
- Dipti Saravanamuttu – poet and academic

== Businesspeople ==
- Shanaka Fernando – founder of Melbourne not-for-profit restaurant group 'Lentil as Anything' (a joke on the rock group Mental As Anything); 2007 Australian Local Hero Award recipient
- Shemara Wikramanayake – CEO of Macquarie Group

== Chefs ==
- Geoff Jansz – Nine Network TV chef
- Peter Kuruvita – chef
- Charmaine Solomon – cookbook author

== Doctors ==
- Dinesh Palipana - quadriplegic doctor and lawyer

== Media and entertainment ==
- Vernon Abeysekera – Director of Radio Ceylon and civil servant
- Karina Carvalho – ABC journalist
- Avani Dias – Hack host (2020–present) and journalist
- Jamie Durie – Seven Network media personality
- Joshua Heuston – model and actor
- Nazeem Hussain – comedian, actor, television and radio presenter
- Dilruk Jayasinha – comedian and actor (Winner – Most Popular New Talent, Logie Awards 2018)
- Olivia Junkeer- Actress
- Ernest MacIntyre – playwright
- Sarah Roberts – television and film actress
- Pria Viswalingam – SBS journalist

== Musicians ==
- Andrew De Silva – R&B and rock singer, winner of Australia's Got Talent in 2012
- Candy Devine – musician, actress
- Cliff Foenander – leading musician with the Fabulous Echoes
- Clarence Jey – Billboard Hot 100 record producer, musician
- Kamahl – singer and actor (born in Malaysia)
- Desmond Kelly – musician and actor
- Alston Koch – musician
- Keith Potger – musician, founding member of the Seekers
- Guy Sebastian – musician, judge on The Voice
- Amali Ward – Australian Idol contestant, singer
- Ecca Vandal – South African-born, Sri Lankan Tamil musician

== Politics ==
- David de Kretser – Governor of Victoria
- Palitha Kohona – former Permanent Secretary to the Sri Lankan Ministry of Foreign Affairs
- Anton Muttukumaru – ex-Army Commander of Ceylon and high Commissioner to Australia, New Zealand, Pakistan and Ambassador to Egypt
- Shiva Pasupati – longest serving Attorney General of Sri Lanka (former); human rights activist
- Jude Perera – State Member for Cranbourne District in the Victorian Legislative Assembly
- Jonathan Sriranganathan – Councillor for The Gabba Ward in the Brisbane City Council
- Michelle Ananda-Rajah — Member of Parliament for Division of Higgins.

== Religion ==
- Ameer Ali – ex-President of the Australian Federation of Islamic Councils
- Roger Herft – Archbishop of Perth
- Danny Nalliah – Christian evangelist pastor
- Gangodawila Soma Thero – chief incumbent of Buddhist Temple Victoria

== Sportspeople ==
- Jack Hingert – footballer for Brisbane Roar and Sri Lanka
- Nishan Vellupilay – footballer for Melbourne Victory and Australia
- Wade Dekker – footballer for Dandenong Thunder and Sri Lanka
- Ashton Agar – cricket player
- Wes Agar – cricketer
- Ishara Amerasinghe – cricketer
- Saliya Ahangama – cricketer and coach
- Craig Jacotine – AFL player
- Hayden Crozier – AFL player
- Chamara Dunusinghe – cricketer
- Jacynta Galabadaarachchi – woman footballer
- Yohan Goonasekera – cricketer
- Gamini Goonesena – cricketer
- Kusal Goonewardena – physical therapist and health lecturer
- Asanka Gurusinha – cricketer
- Chandika Hathurusingha – cricketer and coach
- Suresh Joachim – Guinness World Record holder
- Sanath Kaluperuma – cricketer
- Kosala Kuruppuarachchi – cricketer
- Gab Pound – women's AFL player
- Ravi Ratnayeke – cricketer
- Athula Samarasekera – cricketer
- Prashanth Sellathurai – professional gymnast who competed in New Delhi Commonwealth Games
- Sawan Serasinghe – professional badminton player and Olympian
- Tania Van Heer – sprinter
- Dav Whatmore – coach of the Sri Lanka and Bangladesh cricket teams
- Vineetha Wijesuriya – chess player
- Jamie Young – footballer
- Alofiana Khan-Pereira – Rugby League Player for Gold Coast Titans

== See also ==
- List of Sri Lankans
