= Postal museum, Colombo =

Sri Lankan national museum of post

National Postal Museum
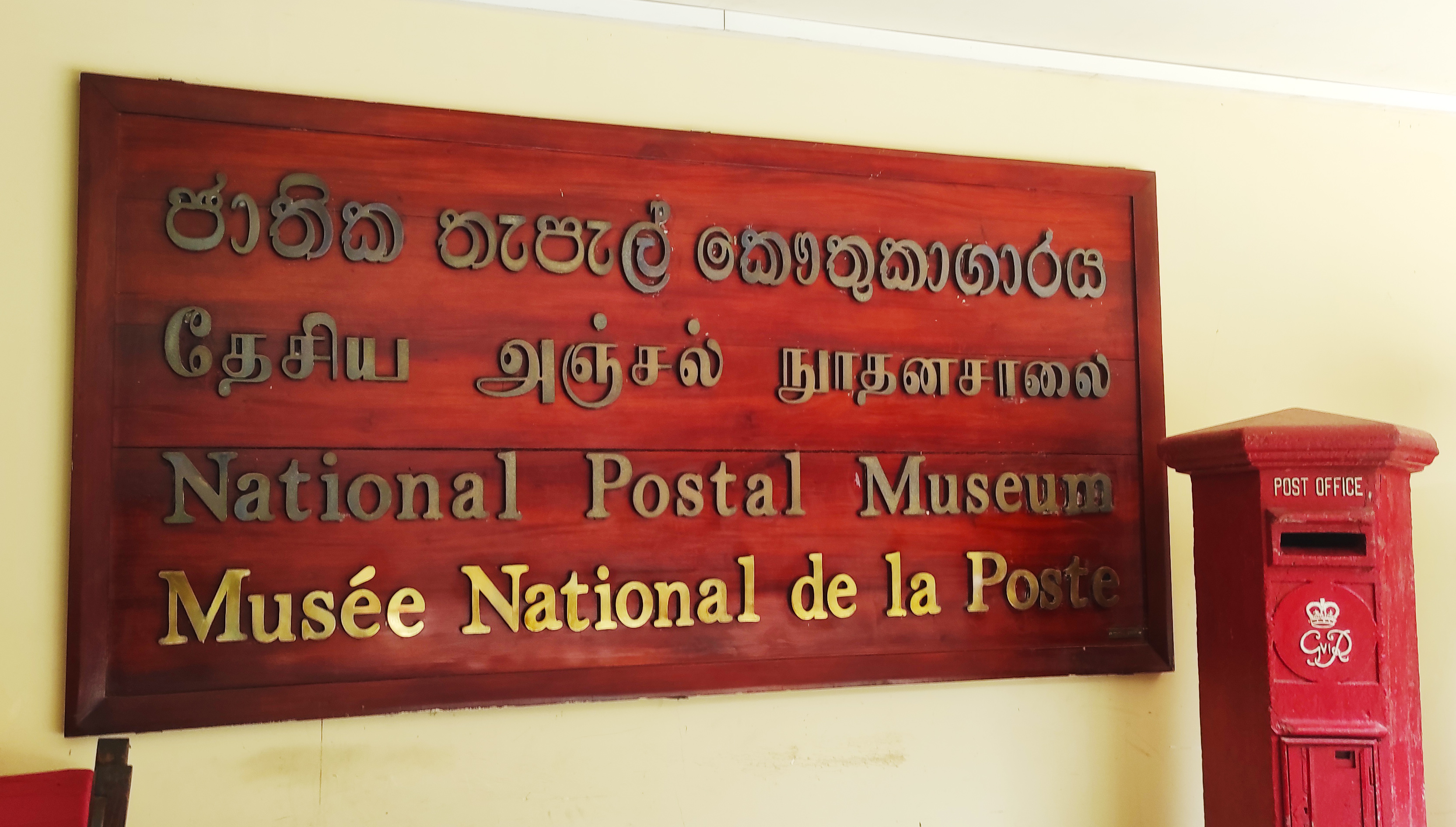
- Name board at the entrance

- Location in central Colombo
- Established: 6 July 2010
- Location: Colombo, Sri Lanka
- Coordinates: 6°55′40.9″N 79°51′29.1″E
- Type: Post
- Website: Department of Post

Postal museum is a Sri Lanka's national museum of post that located at the Postal Headquarters in Colombo, Sri Lanka. Firstly, the postal museum was functioned at the Central Telegraph Office during 1918–1925, and moved to General Post Office in 1994. Again, a national postal museum was opened on 6 July 2010.

The museum has basic information on Dutch period post offices, rare stamps, equipment, pillar boxes, etc. Overall, the museum gives the picture of Sri Lanka Post's history.

== See also ==
- List of museums in Sri Lanka
- Postage stamps and postal history of Sri Lanka
