= Kandy General Post Office =

Post office in Sri Lanka

- මහනුවර ප්‍රධාන තැපැල් කාර්යාලය கண்டி பிரதான அஞ்சல் அலுவலகம்
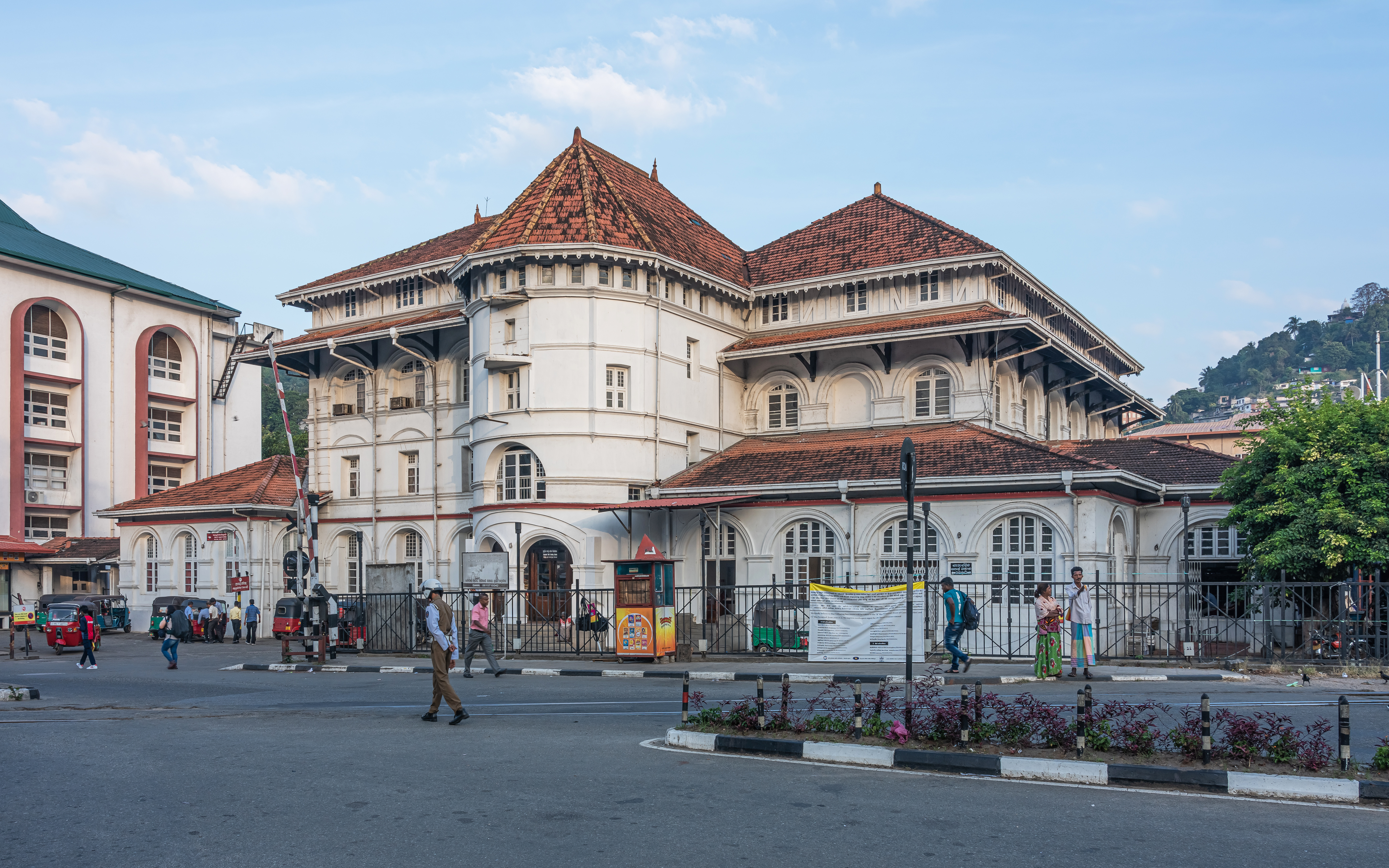
- The Kandy Old Post Office building
- Former names: Kandy Post Office

General information
- Location: Station Road, Kandy, Kandy, Sri Lanka
- Coordinates: 7°17′26″N 80°37′56″E
- Inaugurated: 1902
- Client: Sri Lanka Post

Archaeological Protected Monument of Sri Lanka
- Designated: 8 July 2005

The Kandy General Post Office (Sinhala: මහනුවර ප්‍රධාන තැපැල් කාර්යාලය - கண்டி பிரதான அஞ்சல் அலுவலகம்) is the main post office in Kandy, Sri Lanka.

The first post office was opened in Kandy in 1820, under the direction of the Postmaster General of Ceylon, Louis Sansoni. The first mail coach service, between Colombo and Kandy, began operations in 1832.

== History ==
On 1 July 1857 an overland telegraph line, connecting the Colombo and the Kandy post offices, was opened. In September a submarine cable, connecting Ceylon with India, was laid between Thanaikai Point and Talamannar, with the line from Kandy to Manaar via Mihintale finished in October.

The current post office building, which originally housed the Railway Hotel, was constructed in 1867. The site was previously the location of the Bogambra Coffee Mill, operated by John Walker & Sons. In 1902 it was converted for use as the post office, following its acquisition by the government from the hotel's liquidators.

== Present Day ==
On 8 July 2005 the post office building was gazetted as an Archeological Protected Monument.

In June 2017 the United Postal Trade Union went on a three-day strike in order to stop the government's plans to sell the Nuwara Eliya, Kandy and Galle Fort post offices to private developers, in order for the buildings be converted into hotels. In July 2017 the Kandy City Heritage Committee announced that the post office building would be conserved as a World Bank funded project.

== See also ==
- Other General Post Offices
- Sri Lanka Post
