= Witiyala Seewalie Thera =

Sri Lankan Buddhist monk

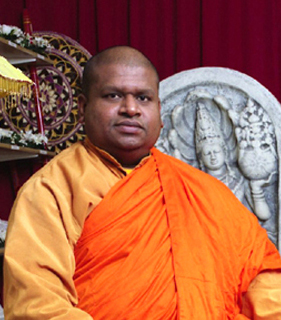
- Title: Founder/President and Abbot of the Minnesota Buddhist Vihara and Deputy Chief monk (Sangha Nayaka) of North America

Personal life
- Born: Witiyala, Sri Lanka

Religious life
- Religion: Buddhism
- School: Theravada
- Lineage: The Malwatte Chapter of the Siam Nikaya

Senior posting
- Based in: North America
- Website: Official Homepage

Witiyala Seewalie Thera (Sinhala: පූජ්‍ය විටියල සීවලී නාහිමි) is the founder and chief incumbent priest of Minnesota Buddhist Vihara. Currently, he is serving the Buddhist spiritual needs for people in six midwestern states: Minnesota, Wisconsin, South Dakota, North Dakota, Iowa and Nebraska.

== Early life and education ==
Seewalie Thera was born in Witiyala, Sri Lanka. He was ordained as a Buddhist monk at the age of 12, and received his education at Migadaya Pirivena,(a monk's school) in Matara. He received upasampada (higher ordination), when he was 20, in Malwatta Maha Vihara, Kandy.

He received his higher education at Vidyalankara Maha Pirivena, Peliyagoda, Sri Lanka. He obtained the degree of Royal Pundit from Oriental Studies Society of Sri Lanka, B.A. honors degree from University of Kelaniya, M.A. degree from Buddhist and Pali University of Sri Lanka, Doctor of Literature degree from Vidyalankara College, Kelaniya, Diploma in Pali Language & Buddhism from Buddhist and Pali University of Sri Lanka, and Diploma in Bible Studies from Bible Society of Kandy.

In June 2009, he received Basic Emergency Service Chaplaincy Diploma from Minnesota Emergency Service Chaplain Association.

== Service ==
Formerly he was the principal of Parama Dhamma Chetiya Maha Pirivena, Ratmalana, Sri Lanka.

He served as a volunteer chaplain to the Minneapolis Police Department, Minnesota. He was an advisor of Sri Lankan Student Association at University of Minnesota. He was a board director on the McKinley Neighborhood Committee and a volunteer teacher at City View School. He has also participated in a religious symposium to discuss Buddhist Meditation at Bethel University. He was invited to conduct an opening prayer for a session in the House Chamber at Minnesota Capitol. He is a Notary public commissioner in the state of Minnesota.

Venerable Seewalie also conducts monthly Buddhist talk and meditation sessions for inmates at South Dakota State Penitentiary, Sioux Falls and Minnesota Correctional Facility – Lino Lakes. In addition, he leads meditation sessions at St. Cloud State University and visit churches and schools to share the teachings of the Buddha.

His mission is to share the Buddha's message of peace and happiness and help create peace and harmony among people in the world.

== Receives honorary title ==
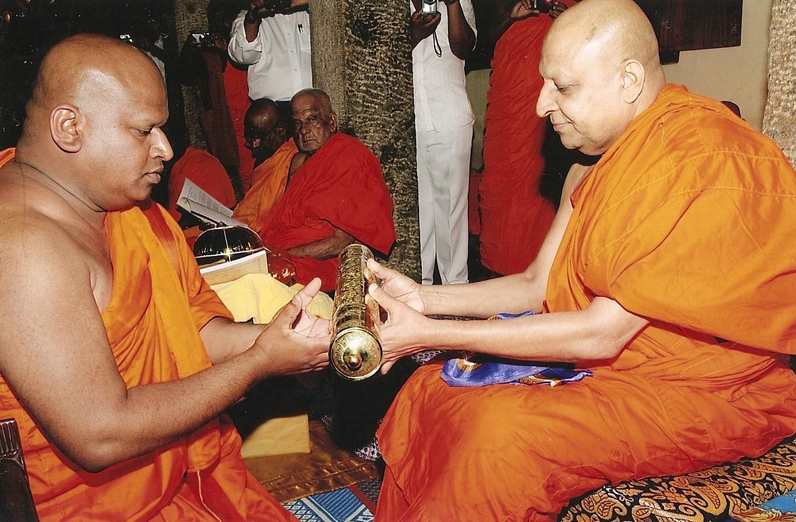
Venerable Seewalie receiving honorary title from Maha Nayaka Thera of Malwatta Chapter, Kandy, Sri Lanka

On June 17, 2011, Malwatta Chapter of Siam Sect appointed him as the Deputy Chief monk (Sangha Nayaka) of North America with the title “Dharmakeerthi Sri Pragnarama” for his services to disseminate the teachings of the Buddha (Buddha Dhamma) in Minnesota and surrounding states.

A congratulatory ceremony was held at Parama Dhamma Chetiya Pirivena in his new appointment.

President of Sri Lanka invited Venerable Seewalie to president’s official residence “Temple Trees” to honor and recognize monk's new position.
