= Louis Sansoni =

Ceylonese postmaster

Postmaster General of Ceylon
- In office 1816 - 1825
- Preceded by: Egbert Bletterman
- Succeeded by: George William Stewart

Personal details
- Born: Louis Guiseppi Sansoni c.1775
- Died: 10 February 1831 (aged 55–56) Galle, Ceylon
- Resting place: Dutch Church, Galle fort
- Spouse: Lydia née Twynam m.1828
- Children: Joseph
- Parent: Guiseppi (Joseph) Sansoni
- Occupation: public servant

Louis Sansoni (c.1775 - 10 February 1831) served as the second Postmaster General of Ceylon, between 1816 and 1825.

Louis Guiseppi Sansoni was born c.1775, the second son of Guiseppi (Joseph) Sansoni, the Italian commander of the trading ship Livorna (named after the Italian city of Livorno). Guiseppi was employed by the Dutch East India Company and the ship voyaged between Europe and India/Ceylon in the 1630s to 1830s. Sansoni's older brother, Joseph (1770-1800), was the garrison surgeon at Galle. Sansoni's name was often incorrectly anglicised as Lewis.

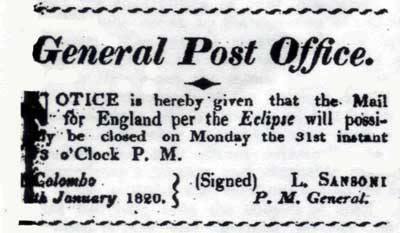

He served as the Custom master in Jaffna between 1813 and 1815. He was appointed as deputy Postmaster General on 1 September 1816 and took over the role as Postmaster General on 1 October 1816, following the retirement of Egbert Bletterman. A position he remained in until 1825, when he was appointed Collector of Revenue and Customs for Galle and Matara, a position he served as until his death in 1831. He was also the private secretary to two Pusine Justices, Sir W. Corke and H. Byrne, between 1816 and 1820. During his tenure as Postmater General he was responsible for establishing the Kandy General Post Office and the Galle Fort Post Office in 1820.

Sansoni's first marriage is unrecorded but he had one son, Joseph, (1800-1857), who in 1824 married Maria Elisabeth Atkinson (1805-1880), the daughter of George Atkinson, the second Surveyor General, in Colombo. Joseph had a second marriage in 1832 to Sara Henrietta Staats (1814-1864).

Sansoni married Lydia Twynam (1810-1892), sister of Captain Thomas Holloway Twynam (1794-1869), Master Attendant of Trincomalee and Point-de-Galle, on 26 February 1828, at the Episcopal Church, Galle. They had no children. He died on 10 February 1831 and was buried at the Dutch Church in Galle. His wife Lydia returned to England by the ship Symmetry, and in 1834 married Thomas Swindale Harvey of the firm of Hancock and Harvey, tea merchants.

Government offices
Preceded by Egbert Bletterman	Postmaster General of Ceylon; 1816–1825	Succeeded by George William Stewart
