= Nuwara Eliya Post Office =

Post offices in Sri Lanka

- නුවර එළිය තැපැල් කාර්යාලය
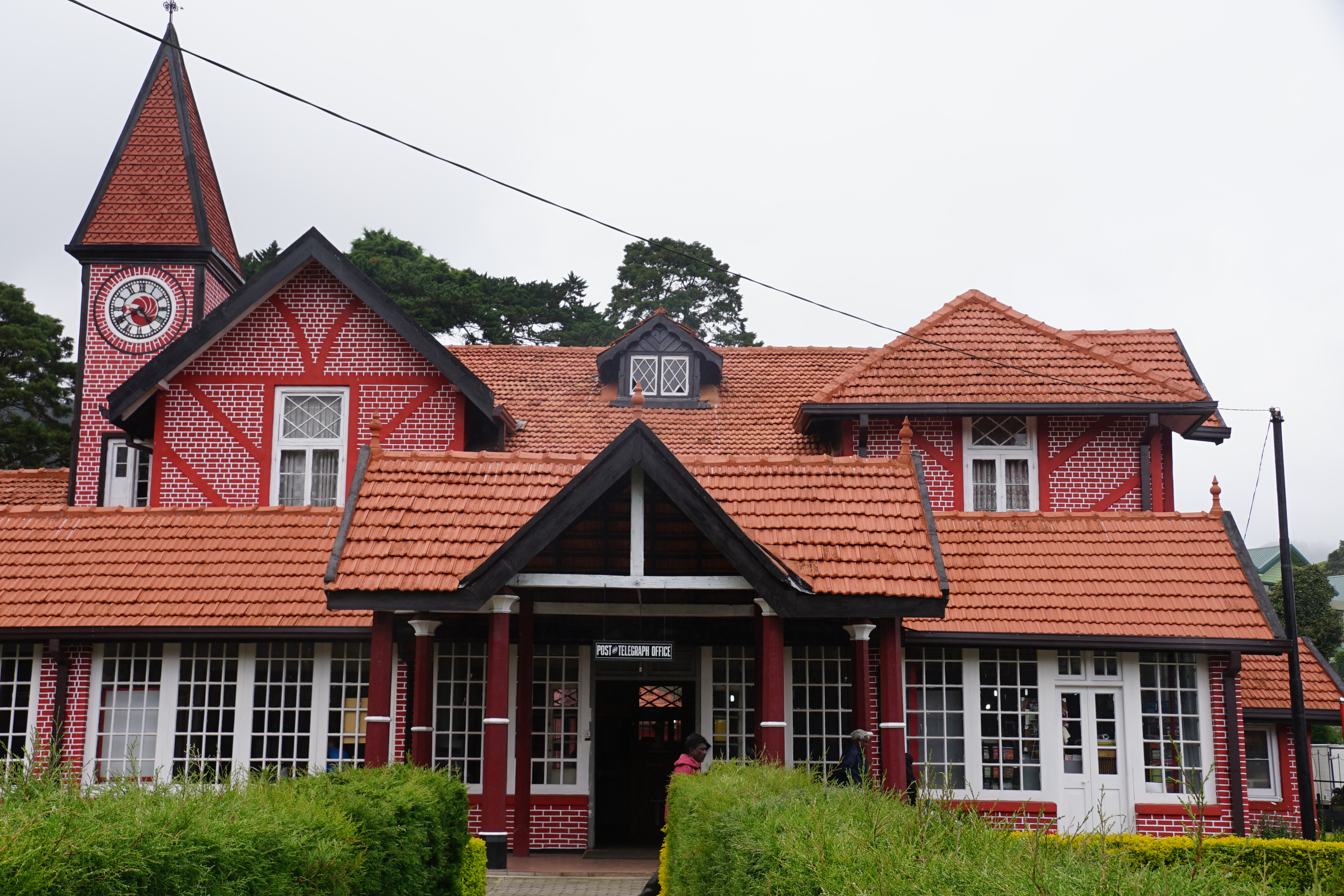
- The Nuwara Eliya Post Office
- Interactive map of the Nuwara Eliya Post Office area

General information
- Architectural style: Tudor Revival
- Location: Nuwara Eliya, Sri Lanka
- Coordinates: 6.971593°N 80.7663864°E
- Inaugurated: 1894
- Client: Sri Lanka Post

Archaeological Protected Monument of Sri Lanka
- Designated: 23 February 2007

The Nuwara Eliya Post Office (Sinhala: නුවර එළිය තැපැල් කාර්යාලය) is located in the centre of Nuwara Eliya and is one of the oldest post offices in Sri Lanka.

== Building ==
The Tudor-style two-storey red-brick building with a clock spire, was constructed in 1815 by the British. and donated to the Postal Department in1894.

In 2012, the postmaster's former living quarters, on the post office's upper floor, were converted into tourist accommodation.

On 26 December 1990 Sri Lanka Post issued a Rs. 10 stamp with a photograph of the Post Office, to commemorate World Postal Day.

In June 2017 the United Postal Trade Union went on a three-day strike in order to stop the government's plans to sell the Nuwara Eliya, Kandy and Galle Fort post offices to private developers, in order for the buildings be converted into hotels.

Interior of the post office

== See also ==
- Other General Post Offices
- Sri Lanka Post
