= Egbert Bletterman =

- Born: Egbertus Lodewijk Bletterman; 3 January 1773; Cape Town, Dutch Cape Colony
- Died: Unknown
- Occupation: public servant
- Known for: Postmaster General of Ceylon
- Term: 1815 - 1817
- Successor: Louis Sansoni
- Spouse: Geertruida Christina née de Waal (m.1794)
- Parent(s): Johannes Matthias Bletterman, Geertruij Catharina née Schot

Egbert Bletterman (born 3 January 1773), was the first official Postmaster General of Ceylon, serving from 1815 to 1817.

Egbertus Lodewijk Bletterman was born on 3 January 1773 in Cape Town in the Dutch Cape Colony, the third of seven children to Johannes Matthias Bletterman (1742-1796), a former Dutch East India Company official (Landdrost of Stellenbosch) and member of the burgher militia, and Geertruij Catharina née Schot (1752-?). On 17 December 1791 he joined the Dutch East India Company as a bookkeeper for the Chamber of Amsterdam. He resigned from the company on 31 August 1793.

On 8 June 1794 he married Geertruida Christina de Waal (1777-1864, Edinburgh), daughter of Arend de Waal and Maria Josina née van As. In 1795 following Britain's occupation of the Dutch Cape Colony Bletterman's family established a business importing and selling goods in the Cape Colony from across and beyond the British Empire.

Bletterman traveled to Ceylon in 1803, where he joined the Ceylon Civil Service and began sending goods to the Cape Colony, a practice that subsequently landed him in trouble with the Ceylon government. The Governor Frederick North appointed him as First Assistant in the Chief Secretary's office. The subsequent British Governor, Thomas Maitland did not look upon Bletterman with the same favour as North had, transferring him to Customs. Bletterman taking the position of Custom-master of the Port of Colombo in 1806. The next Governor Robert Brownrigg appointed him as the colony's Postmaster General in 1815.

In 1812 he established one of the first privately owned and operated coffee plantations, obtaining a licence to export the produce. It was ultimately unsuccessful due to the poor condition of the soil. In 1814, Bletterman applied successfully to Governor Brownrigg for permission to export arrack, coconuts, tobacco, coffee, pepper, and saffron to the Cape. In January 1825, he was appointed a special envoy for trading interests of the Ceylon government at the Cape.

Government offices
Preceded by	Postmaster General of Ceylon; 1815–1817	Succeeded by Louis Sansoni
