= List of Sri Lankan film directors =

This is a list of Sri Lankan film directors.

== A ==
- Tissa Abeysekhara

== B ==
- Dharmasiri Bandaranayake

== D ==
- Malaka Dewapriya

== F ==
- Gamini Fonseka

== G ==
- Siri Gunasinghe

== H ==
- Asoka Handagama

== J ==
- Vimukthi Jayasundara
- Jagath Manuwarna

== K ==
- Boodee Keerthisena

== M ==
- Sudath Mahaadivulwewa

== N ==
- D. B. Nihalsingha

== O ==
- Vasantha Obeysekera

== P ==
- Dharmasena Pathiraja
- Lester James Peries
- Sumitra Peries
- H. D. Premaratne
- Sanjeewa Pushpakumara

== R ==
- King Ratnam
- Ranjan Ramanayake
- Pradeepan Raveendran

== T ==
- Titus Thotawatte

== V ==
- Prasanna Vithanage

== W ==
- Sirisena Wimalaweera
