= Rienzi Crusz =

Canadian poet

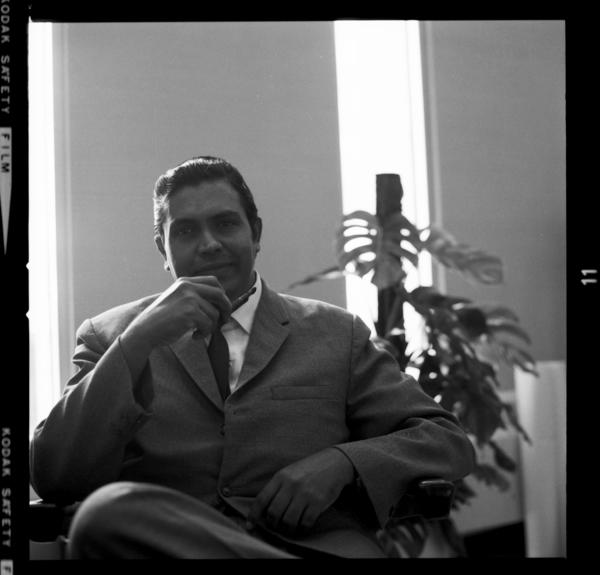
- Born: October 17, 1925; Galle, Sri Lanka
- Died: September 8, 2017 (aged 91)

Rienzi Crusz (17 October 1925 - 8 September 2017) was a Canadian poet. Born in Galle, Ceylon (now Sri Lanka), Crusz immigrated to Toronto, Canada in 1965 and soon after began publishing poetry. Though his poetry deals with a wide variety of human experience, Crusz is best known for his poetry that illuminates his experience of immigration, migrancy and the alienation of exile.

== Early life ==
As a young child Crusz's family moved to Colombo, where he attended high school at St. Joseph's and St. Peter's colleges. Crusz's education was in English, and he was exposed to much of the canon of Western literature including Shakespeare, Milton, and Dylan Thomas (to whom he is sometimes compared), which would later influence his writing. Nonetheless, his poetry cites Sri Lanka as a place of memory and longing, Buddhism in "Karma" and other poems, the sounds of the rabana drum and classical Sri Lankan dance, though as he said in a 2014 interview that his work is "not a travel book". His Catholic upbringing would also heavily influence his poetry especially "Gambolling with the Divine".

== Education and employment ==
Crusz received a Bachelor of Arts in history at the University of Colombo in 1948. In 1951 Crusz went to England to study library science at the School of Librarianship and Archives at the University of London as a Colombo Plan Scholar. After returning from England Crusz worked at the Central Bank of Ceylon as chief reference librarian until immigrating to Canada in 1965. Crusz earned a Bachelor of Library Science at the University of Toronto after his arrival, and then attained a Master of Arts in History at the University of Waterloo. He remained at the University of Waterloo until 1993 as a senior reference and collections development librarian. His library work greatly influenced his non-fiction publications.

== Early literary work ==
Crusz began his literary career as a storyteller for his three children. In Sri Lanka he wrote "Bumpis, the magic Elephant" which portrays Canada as a haven. Chelva Kanaganayakam describes this early story as "prophetic", as it foreshadows his later experience of immigration and exile.

After his arrival in Canada, Crusz was encouraged to continue writing by Irving Layton, then published his first poems in several literary magazines and journals such as The Fiddlehead, The Malahat Review and Canadian Forum.

Flesh and Thorn, put into print in 1974 with pen and ink drawings by Virgil Burnett, is Crusz's first published collection of poetry. Although much of Crusz's work has been described as autobiographic, it is Flesh and Thorn that most resounds with Crusz's personal life.

Elephant and Ice, Crusz's second collection of poetry, was published in 1980 and reissued in a limited edition in 2005 of 500 numbered and signed copies. It has been most used to examine Crusz's comparisons of Canada and Sri Lanka. Crusz's work is full of dualities, the most apparent being that of his "negotiation" of Canada and Sri Lanka and where he stands in relation to each country. Even the title of this book is binary, with Elephant standing for Sri Lanka and Ice for Canada. The critic Arun Mukherjee writes in the essay "Songs of an Immigrant" that Crusz's binaries show that he is divided in his loyalties and that he uses his Sri Lankan past to "scrutinize his life in Canada". As a post-colonial poet, Crusz questions both homelands, Sri Lanka and Canada, but makes little reference to his time in England as a student.

== Later literary work ==
Crusz went on to publish more volumes of poetry,"Singing against the Wind" (1985, reissued in 2005), A Time for Loving (1986), Still Close to the Raven (1989, reissued in 2008), The Rain Doesn't Know me Anymore (1992), Beatitudes of Ice (1995; reissued in 2008) and Insurgent Rain: Selected Poems 1974–1996 (1997) before publishing Lord of the Mountain: The Sardiel Poems (1999),"Love Where the Nights are Green" (2007) "Enough to be Mortal Now" (2009), "Don't tell me that I'm not an elephant" (2012), "How to Dance in this Rarefied Air" (2017). "In the Twilight of my Bones", a manuscript of new and unpublished poems, is awaiting publication.

Lord of the Mountain is an anomaly among Crusz's works, a mixed genre (prose and poetry) work about the life, trial and death of the Sri Lankan Robin Hood, Sardiel. Sardiel was a famous Sri Lankan bandit of the mid-nineteenth century who robbed from the rich to help the poor. He was captured and hanged in 1864. Sardiel is generally celebrated in Sri Lanka as a national hero; many stories and articles have been written about him and he is a favourite story of Sri Lankan children

Like the popular stories told about Sardiel, Crusz initially celebrates Sardiel in Lord of the Mountain by writing of Sardiel as the "champion of the underdog" and showing how Sardiel resented and resisted the occupation of the colonial British. In "Obituary for the Nakoti Chettiar" where "the body of one of the richest merchants in the city was found in a cruelly mangled state at the foot of a huge bo tree just outside a Buddhist temple" and in "The White Arabian's Flank" where "once, twice, three times, [Sardiel's] serrated blade flashes, finds it target" in an Arab horse trader's body, however, Crusz complicates the character of Sardiel by revealing his immoral side as well: Crusz portrays some of Sardiel's exploits as not necessarily being for the greater good. For example, when Sardiel begins to doubt the nobility in his crimes in the poem "Which Way?", the reader too has reason to doubt Sardiel's virtue in his actions as a criminal and after capture. Crusz also emphasised Sardiel's conversion from Buddhism to Christianity upon his capture in Lord of the Mountain. This historical fact underlines the dichotomies in this work and asks readers to think critically about the complex motives for the adoption of Christianity by Sri Lankans under colonial rule. In a private correspondence Crusz has described Sardiel's conversion as "courageous". Like Ondaatje's "The Collected Works of Billy the Kid", readers' sympathies are initially attached to a bandit as protagonist, only to find them questioned later without necessarily attaching to the antagonist.

== Non-fiction work ==
Crusz also published several non-fiction books, of note is Ralph Nader: a Bibliography, 1960–1982, published at a time (first-edition, 1973) when Ralph Nader's views against triumphant consumerism were gaining understanding among the public.

== Critical reception ==
After Crusz sent Irving Layton a few pieces when he first began writing, Layton said about them, "The poems are very good indeed". In Dark Antonyms and Paradise, the most comprehensive book about Crusz's work to date, Chelva Kanaganayakam has shown that Crusz is legitimate in his uses of the themes of immigration and alienation. Crusz's work appears in Sinhalese and English in Sri Lanka, in translation to French in "Ce qu'Ile dit" and in McGraw-Hill's "Constructing Meaning: Skills for Understanding Contemporary Texts". As a Sri Lankan writer in Canada, some would compare him with Michael Ondaatje.

== Further reading and archives ==
- Kanaganayakam, Chelva. Dark Antonyms and Paradise: the Poetry of Rienzi Crusz.Toronto: TSAR, 1997.
- TSAR Publications
- Rienzi Crusz Archive at the University of Waterloo

== Works ==
=== Poetry ===
- Flesh and Thorn. Stratford, Ont.: Pasdeloup Press, 1974.
- Elephant and Ice. Erin, Ont.: Porcupine's Quill, 1980.
- Singing Against the Wind. Erin, Ont.: Porcupine's Quill, 1985.
- A Time For Loving. Toronto: TSAR, 1986.
- Still Close to the Raven. Toronto: TSAR, 1989.
- The Rain Doesn't Know Me Anymore. Toronto: TSAR, 1992.
- Beatitudes of Ice. Toronto: TSAR, 1995.
- Lord of the Mountain: The Sardiel Poems. Toronto: TSAR, 1999.
- Gambolling with the Divine. Toronto: TSAR, 2003.
- Love Where the Nights are Green. Stratford: Pasdeloup Press, 2007.
- Enough to be Mortal Now. Toronto, TSAR, 2009.
- Don't tell me that I'm not an elephant. Waterloo: Elvin Hill Publishing, 2012.
- "How to Dance in this Rarefied Air". Toronto: Mawenzi House (TSAR), 2017

=== Non-fiction ===
- Business : a guide to select reference sources. Waterloo, Ont.: University of Waterloo Library, 1978.
- Ralph Nader: a bibliography, 1960–1982. 2nd Edition. Waterloo, Ont.: University of Waterloo Library, 1982.
- "In Memoriam Michael Charles Crusz", Obit 9 August 1959.
