= Sri Lanka Post =

Sri Lankan postal service

- Company type: Department
- Industry: Postal service
- Founded: 1 April 1798 (228 years ago)
- Headquarters: General Post Office, Colombo, Sri Lanka
- Area served: Sri Lanka
- Key people: Bandula Gunawardane (Ministry of Post)
- Services: Post office, Mail delivery, banking, sourier
- Revenue: ▲ Rs 6.996 billion (2017)
- Net income: ▲ Rs 477,005 (2017)
- Owner: Government of Sri Lanka
- Number of employees: >80,000 (2017)
- Parent: Ministry of Post
- Website: www.slpost.gov.lk

The Department of Posts, functioning under the brand name Sri Lanka Post (Sinhala: ශ්‍රී ලංකා තැපැල් Shri Lanka Tæpæl), is a government operated postal system in Sri Lanka. The postal headquarters is the General Post Office which is located in Colombo. The department itself comes under the purview of the Ministry of Information and Mass Media. It was formerly known as the Ceylon Post and Telecommunications Department and is one of the oldest Government departments in existence today.

The head of the Sri Lanka Post is the Postmaster General, currently Ranjith Ariyaratne. Assisting in administration there is a deputy Postmaster General in every province. Sri Lanka Post employs more than 22,000 employees in various positions to staff and support the 4738 post offices across the country.

== History ==
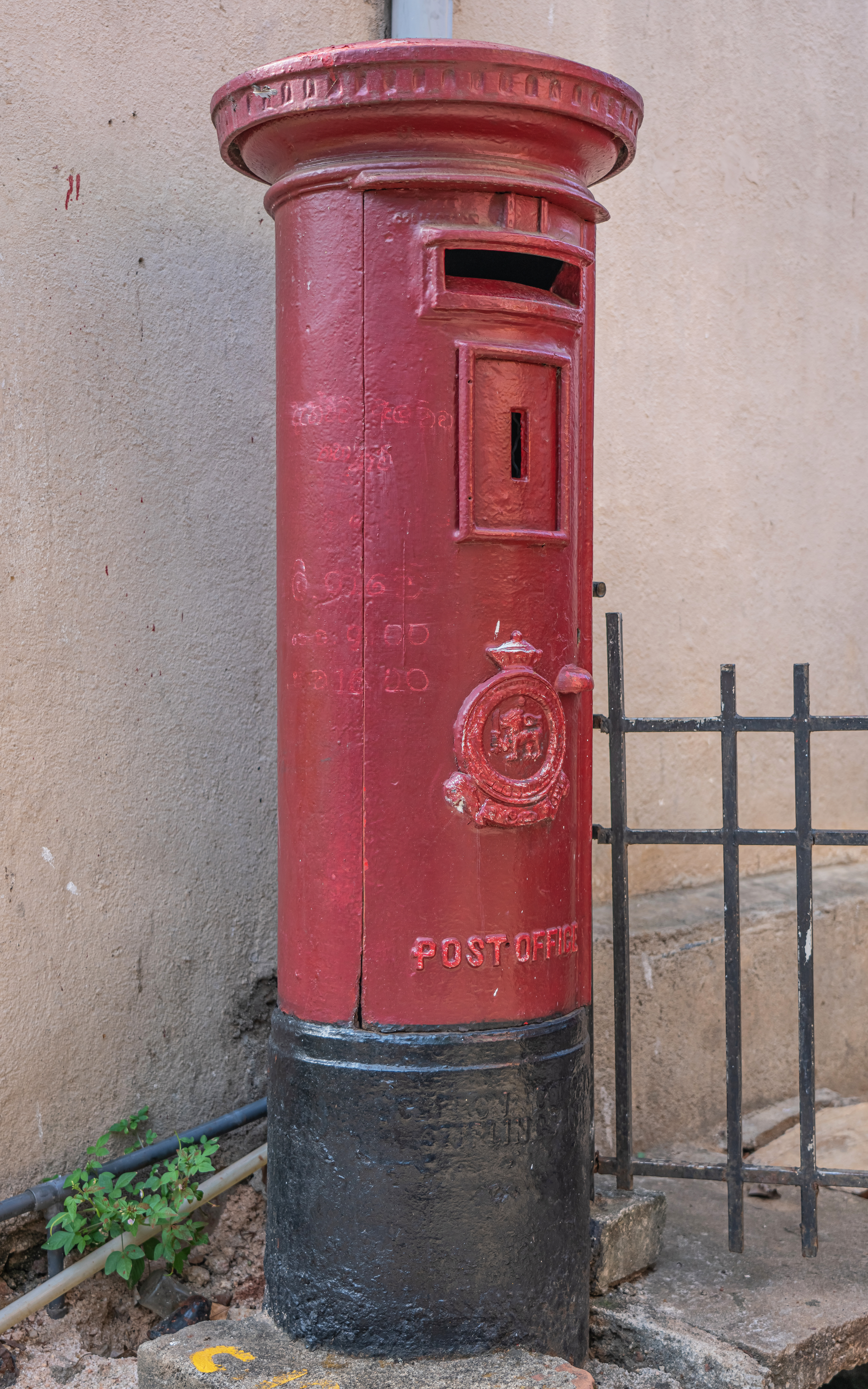
A public postbox in Kandy

Sri Lanka Post has a long history of 222 years, dating back to 1798, when the colonial Dutch rulers started five post offices in the Maritime Districts under their control. In 1799, they published the first postal regulations and postage rates. The Dutch East India Company operated the Postal service, which was not meant for the public but for official use.

The British took control of the country in 1815, when Egbert Bletterman was the Postmaster General for the whole island. Louis Sansoni succeeded Bletterman as the second Postmaster General in 1817. The third Postmaster General was Major G. Stewart, who extended the postal services to major towns in the country. They re-organised the postal service and others eventually established a permanent Post Office in Colombo in 1882.

=== Postage stamps ===
The only evidence of a British postal service before 1815 is a "Colombo Post Free" handstamp used on a soldier's letter in 1809, when British Royal Artillery troops were engaged to subdue Sri Vikrama Rajasinha, the king of Kandy (1798–1815), whose inland territory had never been under the influence of the Dutch.

The first adhesive stamps (the six-pence purple-brown stamps on blued paper) were issued on 1 April 1857, seventeen years after Britain had introduced the adhesive postage stamp to the world. The first stamps in local denominations of rupees and cents were issued on 1 February 1892.

On August 20, 2024, Sri Lanka's Postal Department released the world's longest stamp, measuring 205 millimetres (8.1 in). This stamp celebrates the Sri Dalada Perahera festival in Kandy.

=== The General Post Office ===
The General Post Office was housed in different places in Colombo. By 1895 it acquired its own building, opposite the Governor General's residence - the Queens's House on Queen's Street, currently the Janadhipath Mawatha (President's Street). During the disturbances in the country, the GPO was moved out of its former building and into the present Postal Headquarters. The new building, consisting of 9 floors of modern facilities, is the center of operations and administration. The Postal Museum, too, is housed in this building.

=== Transportation ===
Over the years, different modes of transport have been used for the transportation and delivery of mail. In a bygone era, delivery was first by foot (in the hills and remote places it is not uncommon to see postmen delivering letters on foot, even today!), then bicycles were added. Sri Lanka Post was the first to inaugurate a mail coach service in Asia. The mail coach service began operations in 1832, between Colombo and Kandy. This was extended between Galle and Colombo in 1838. The year 1892 saw the first "Travelling Post Office" doing its run between Colombo and Peradeniya, a suburb of Kandy.

"Bedford" vans made in England were used, even during the '70s. Today Sri Lanka Post uses a fleet of Japanese vehicles painted in the traditional red. During the '50s and '60s postmen on British made BSA - Bantam motorcycles were a familiar sight. When the postman's beat becoming smaller in the cities, the motorcycles gave way to the bicycles. The mails are carried today by railway, public and private omni-buses, and the department's fleet of vehicles.

== See also ==
- General Post Office, Colombo
- List of people on stamps of Sri Lanka
- Information and Communication Technology Agency of Sri Lanka
- Post and Telegraph Signals
- Postage stamps and postal history of Sri Lanka
- Postal codes in Sri Lanka
- Postal museum, Colombo

== External links and sources ==
- Sri Lanka Post
