= Sam Weerahandi =

Samaradasa Weerahandi, is the first Sri Lankan American statistician to be honored as a Fellow of the American Statistical Association. Also known as Sam Weerahandi, he is a former professor last employed in Corporate America by Pfizer, Inc. as a Senior Director until December 2016.

Weerahandi introduced a number of notions, concepts, and methods for statistical analysis of small samples based on exact probability statements, which are referred to as exact statistics. Commonly known as generalized inferences, the new concepts include generalized p-value generalized confidence intervals and generalized point estimation. These methods, which are discussed in the two books he wrote, have been found to produce more accurate inferences compared to classical methods based on asymptotic methods when the sample size is small or when large samples tends to be noisy. He used statistical techniques based on these notions to bring statistical practice into business management.

== Leadership Highlights ==
- A Founding Member of FOSUS (Friends of Sri Lanka and Sri Lankan Americans in US):
  - A leading member in forming US Congressional Caucus on Sri Lanka and the Sri Lankan Americans.
  - Served as primary speaker and organizer of Community meetings with the US Congress.
- Led Diversity Communications with
  - Pfizer executives that lead to the appointment of first Indian American EVP reporting to the CEO and promoting many Asian Americans.
  - Time Warner executives that resulted in the promotion of the first Indian American to a GM level job.
  - President of Time/Warner that resulted in the promotion of the first African American to VP level.
- Primary speaker at community events organized by
  - Sri Lankan Ambassadors to US.
  - Sri Lankan Ambassadors to UN.
- Founded the Federation of South Asian Artists in US and successfully communicated with all media and entertainment companies for increased diversity in casting in Time Warner companies and featuring them in Time Inc. magazines.

== Bibliography ==
- Exact Statistical Methods for Data Analysis", Springer-Verlag, New York, 1995
- Generalized Inference in Repeated

Measures: Exact Methods in MANOVA and Mixed Models. Wiley, Hoboken, New Jersey, 2004.
