= List of Sri Lankan military personnel =

Notable Military personnel of Sri Lanka

- Sarath Fonseka
- John Kotelawala
- Jagath Jayasuriya
- Shavendra Silva
- Denzil Kobbekaduwa
- Rohan Daluwatte
- Gamini Kularatne
- Lalith Jayasinghe
- D. A. Priyantha Dissanayake

== See also ==
List of Sri Lankan generals

Commander of the Army (Sri Lanka)

Commander of the Navy (Sri Lanka)

Commander of the Air Force (Sri Lanka)
