= Minnesota Buddhist Vihara =

Theravada Buddhist temple in Minneapolis, Minnesota

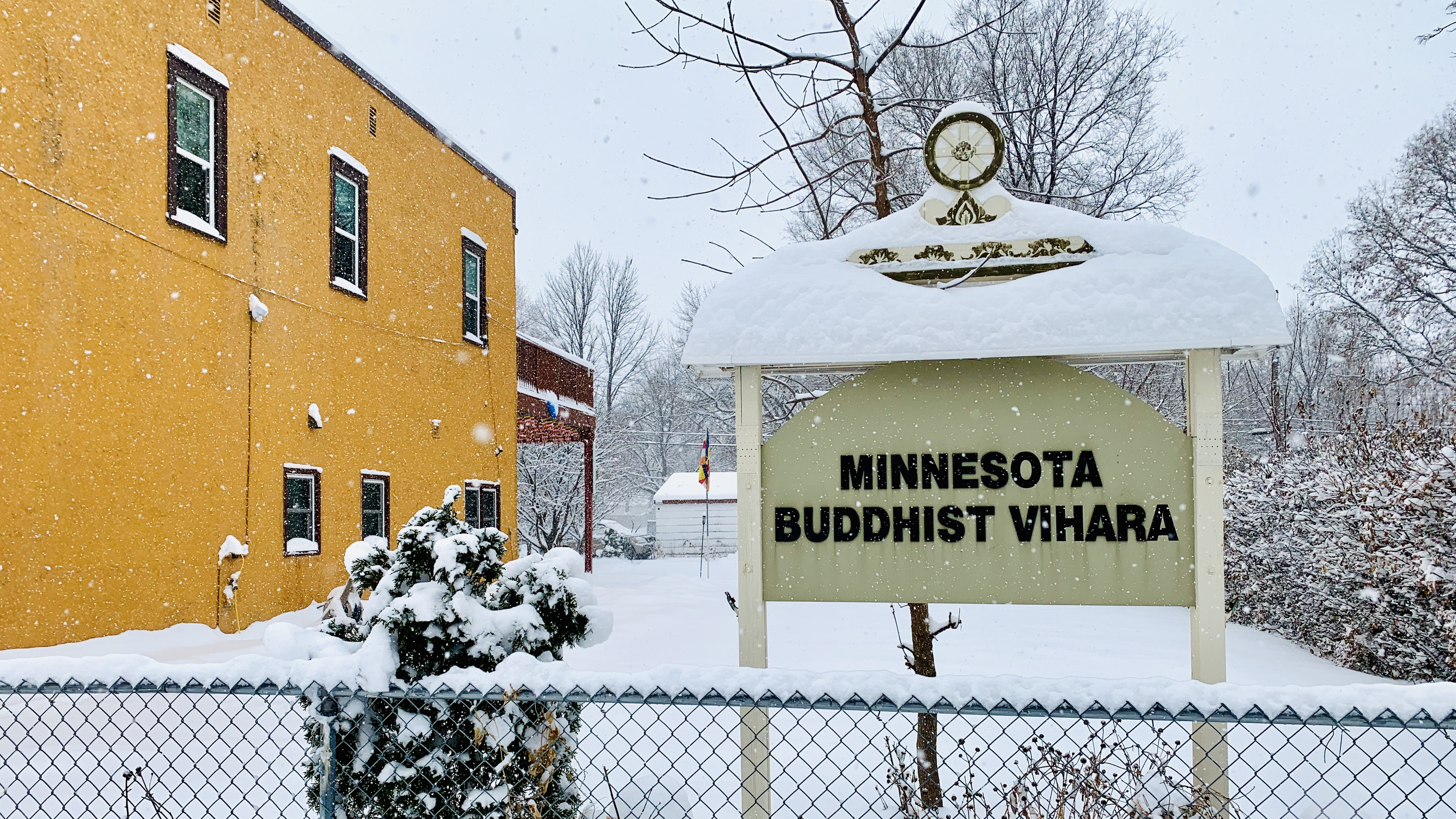
- Front view of the Minnesota Buddhist Vihara, Minnesota

Religion
- Affiliation: Theravada Buddhism
- Leadership: Witiyala Seewalie Thera, founder

Location
- Location: 3401 N. 4th Street, Minneapolis, MN 55412
- State: Minnesota
- Country: United States of America
- Interactive map of Minnesota Buddhist Vihara
- Coordinates: 45.016933°N 93.285094°W

Website
- mnbv.org

Minnesota Buddhist Vihara is a Theravada Buddhist temple in the state of Minnesota. It was established in 2004 by Venerable Witiyala Seewalie Maha Thera, who is also the current Abbot of the Vihara and the Deputy Chief Sangha Nayaka of North America, appointed by the Malwatta Chapter in Kandy, Sri Lanka. Its 10th anniversary was celebrated on March 30, 2014.

== History ==
The Vihara came to an existence in need of a spiritual place in the Midwest. Ven. Seewalie was invited by the Buddhist community in Twin Cities to conduct religious and spiritual activities. Initially, the activities were held at Thien An, a Vietnamese Buddhist temple, in Blaine. As the community started to grow, the current location was purchased and held an opening ceremony on June 24, 2006. A president of Sri Lanka issued a greetings on the opening of the temple and said,

“In an era when the Buddhist teaching is most wanted to the world. I treat the inauguration of the Minnesota Buddhist Vihara as a remarkable event. I wish the sublime motive of propagating the teaching of the Buddha by the inaugurators of this vihara be a success”

== Services ==
Since its inception, the Vihara has been a central place for Buddhist community from various backgrounds to come and experience religious and spiritual events such as weekly meditation session, monthly meditation retreats and annual ceremonies.

Its service is not limited to the state but has expanded to neighboring states as well. Resident monks visit South Dakota State Penitentiary once a month to teach and guide mindfulness session for inmates. They also travel to North Dakota twice a year to lead a day-long mindfulness session in Fargo-Moorhead area. In addition, they visit universities, churches, and schools to share the teachings of the Buddha.

On April 21, 2019, a public memorial service was held in memory of Sri Lanka Bombing victims.

The Vihara is open to the public and invites everyone to come and explore the Buddha's teachings.

== Addition to temple ==
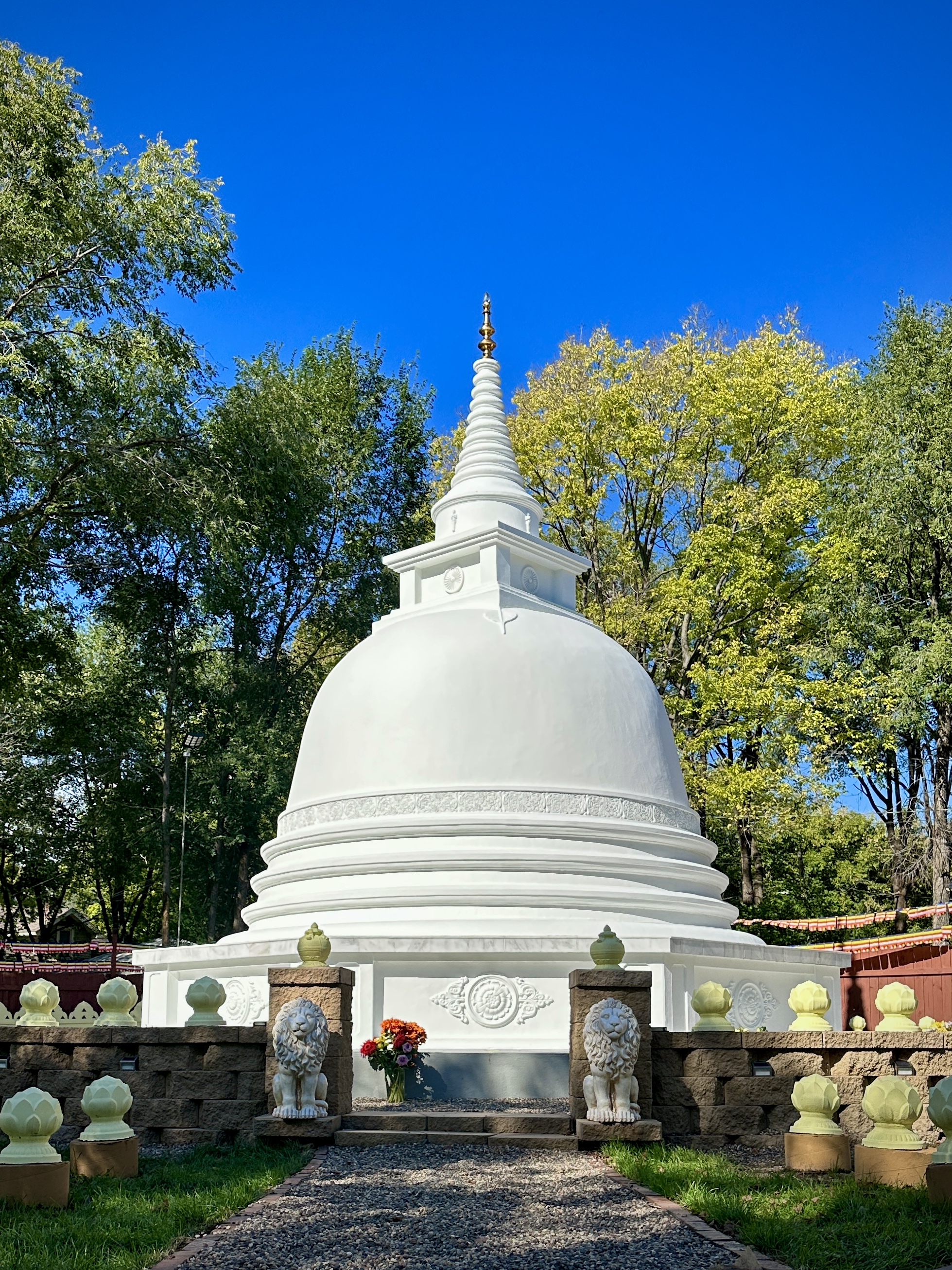
A sacred stupa in the temple premise.

Under the guidance of Venerable Seewalie's leadership, the temple commenced the construction of a sacred stupa within its premises in April 2021. On October 6, 2023, a formal ceremony was convened to commemorate its completion. Distinguished monks from diverse temples and devout laities congregated to offer chants and blessings, signifying a momentous achievement for the temple.
