= Yale Journal of International Affairs =

- Discipline: International affairs
- Language: English
- Edited by: Dan Kent

Publication details
- History: 2005–present
- Publisher: International Affairs Council at Yale (United States)
- Frequency: Biannual

Standard abbreviations
- ISO 4: Yale J. Int. Aff.

Indexing
- ISSN: 1936-2641

Links
- Journal homepage

The Yale Journal of International Affairs is an international affairs policy journal based out of Yale University (New Haven, CT). The journal is published biannually and contains articles, interviews and op-eds by academics, policy practitioners and advanced graduate students.

== History ==
The journal published its first issue in the Summer/Fall of 2005, which featured interviews with The New York Times journalist David Brooks, human rights activist John Prendergast, and articles by political scientist Paul Bracken and United States Agency for International Development administrator Andrew Natsios. Later issues have included articles by prominent academics and practitioners in the international relations field including British Prime Minister Tony Blair, environmentalist Ma Jun, presidential adviser Samantha Power, economist Joseph Stiglitz, Georgian Ambassador Irakli Alasania, and United States Secretary of Homeland Security Michael Chertoff.

The Yale Journal of International Affairs has produced four themed issues:

- "Spotlight on Development" (Volume 5, Issue 1), which included commentary from George Ayittey, William Easterly, Paul Collier and Nancy Birdsall;
- "Spotlight on Security" (Volume 5, Issue 2), which included commentary from John Negroponte, Mary Kaldor, and Stephen M. Walt;
- "Spotlight on Women" (Volume 6, Issue 1), which included commentary from Muhtar Kent;
- "Spotlight on Resources" (Volume 6, Issue 2), which included commentary from General Stanley McChrystal and James Woolsey.

According to Richard Levin, President of Yale University, "[f]ounded and edited by students in the departments and professional schools across the University, the Journal has accepted submissions from Yale students, faculty, and alumni, as well as prominent scholars and practitioners based elsewhere. The Yale Journal of International Affairs Graduate Student Publication serves as a unique showcase for the University's broad expertise in international affairs and as an important forum for scholarly debate on global issues."
