= Journal of International Affairs =

- Discipline: International affairs
- Language: English

Publication details
- History: 1947–present
- Publisher: School of International and Public Affairs, Columbia University (United States)
- Frequency: Biannual

Standard abbreviations
- ISO 4: J. Int. Aff.

Indexing
- ISSN: 0022-197X
- JSTOR: 0022197X
- OCLC no.: 39098532

Links
- Journal homepage

The Journal of International Affairs is a biannual academic journal covering foreign affairs. It is edited by graduate students at the School of International and Public Affairs at Columbia University. It was established in 1947 as a nonprofit organization.

Aaron Klieman was the editor-in-chief from 1964 to 1965.
