= Kumaravelu Vignarajah =

Kumaravelu Vignarajah (also Nishanthan to the Liberation Tigers of Tamil Eelam (LTTE or Tamil Tigers), Chandran to Sri Lankan military intelligence) was a Sri Lankan Tamil who worked as a spy for the Sri Lankan Intelligence Service, arrested on eight charges while living in Canada, accused of infiltrating the Royal Canadian Mounted Police while fundraising for the Tamil Tigers. It was discovered he was passing Sri Lankan military secrets to the Canadians, and classified information from both Canada and Sri Lanka to the militant group.

== Life ==
A native of Avrankal Sri Lanka, where his "very rich" father ran a coconut plantation, He was recruited as a spy for the Sri Lankan military intelligence as early as 1982, and worked for the government forces as a spy under Lt. Col. Sunil Tennakoon. He also maintained a job at the Bank of Ceylon.

On January 9 1985, Sri Lankan forces conducted a raid in Vignarajah's hometown, killing a deputy leader of the Tigers, ostensibly after he confirmed information from a captured Tiger that suggested the deputy's presence.

By 1986, he was a trusted friend of Gopalaswamy Mahendraraja, a commander of Tiger forces. In the autumn of 1987, Vignarajah was photographed during an assault against an Indian Peace Keeping Force platoon, and his photograph was published on the cover of the November edition of India Today. He later took a journalist from the magazine to meet Thenmuli Rajaratnam, a militant who later made headlines for assassinating former Indian prime minister Rajiv Gandhi.

In 1988 he left his job at the bank, and the following year told his government handlers that Velupillai Prabhakaran had begun to suspect he might be a spy, and thus requested their assistance fleeing the country, immigrating to Canada.

== In Canada ==
When Vignarajah sought to immigrate to Canada in 1994, Tennakoon wrote a series of reference letters vouching for his military and intelligence service to Canadian authorities, and he was subsequently hired as a wiretap translator for the Royal Canadian Mounted Police (RCMP). Tenakoon kept in touch with Vignarajah after he moved, writing letters to his Ottawa address.

He applied for, and was granted, landed immigrant status in Canada under his real name after he told immigration authorities he faced persecutions from both the government and the Tigers, stating that he wanted to pursue "the peaceful life" in Canada; and though the Canadian Security Intelligence Service is alleged to have known about his history with the Tamil Tigers, it is believed they didn't inform the RCMP as they wanted to capitalise on his information. He settled in Toronto, where the vast majority of Canada's Tamil population had settled following the 1980s flood of refugees from Sinhalese violence.

Vignarajah worked at the Bank of Nova Scotia in Canada, while also employed by the RCMP; allegedly giving Canadians inside information on the Tigers, while also giving the Tigers information on the Canadians.

Tennakoon sent Vignarajah a series of letters, reminding him of the notes he had written to Canadian officials on his behalf and seeking assurance that the favours would be returned. He also asked Vignarajah whether he could bring back gifts for his family, including a washing machine, and a doll for his daughter, and a pair of "cheap" Timex watches and some CDs of Michael Jackson for his two sons.

== Arrest ==
Photos were soon shown to Canadian officials, showing Vignarajah posing with the bodies of dead Indian troops, implicating him with the Tigers.

On May 9 1996, police surrounded the bank where Vignarajah had been nominated as top employee, and arrested him on the basis he was a commander of the Tamil Tigers. A search of his house yielded a 1986 edition of the Shooter's Bible, recordings and transcripts of RCMP wiretaps into local Tamil residents, equipment believed to have been taken from the RCMP, and a copy of his resume on which he claimed to be an employee of "the RCMP Central Government Secret Intelligence Service".
