= List of people on the postage stamps of Sri Lanka =

This is a list of people on the postage stamps of Sri Lanka, formerly known as Ceylon.

The list is complete through 1980.

== Ceylon (through 1972) ==
- Victoria of the United Kingdom (1857)
- Edward VII of the United Kingdom (1903)
- George V of the United Kingdom (1912)
- George VI of the United Kingdom (1937)
- D. S. Senanayake, prime minister (1949, 1966, 1968)
- Elizabeth II of the United Kingdom (1953)
- Sir John Kotelawala, prime minister (1956)
- Hikkaduwe Sri Sumangala Thera, educator (1959)
- Ratmalane Sri Dharmaloka Thera, educator (1959)
- Anagarika Dharmapala, Buddhist missionary (1964)
- Solomon Bandaranaike, prime minister (1961)
- Henry S. Olcott, Buddhist reformer (1967)
- D. B. Jayatilaka, Buddhist scholar (1968)
- E. W. Perera, legislator (1969)
- Alexander Ekanayake Goonesinha, trade unionist, politician (1969)
- Ananda Coomaraswamy (1971)
- Vladimir Lenin, Soviet leader (1971)
- Cumaratunga Munidasa (1971)
- Arumuga Navalar (1971)
- Edward Henry Pedris, patriot (1971)
- Ananda Rajakaruna (1971)
- Charles Henry de Soysa, philanthropist (1971)
- S. Mahinda Thero (1971)

== Sri Lanka (from 1972) ==
- Solomon Bandaranaike, prime minister (1973, 1974)
- Muhammad Lafir, billiards player (1973)
- Ponnambalam Ramanathan, lawyer, educator (1975)
- D.J. Wimalasurendra, engineer (1975)
- Sirimavo Bandaranaike, prime minister (1976)
- Alexander Graham Bell, inventor (1976)
- Ponnambalam Arunachalam, educator (1977)
- Thotagamuwe Sri Rahula Thera, poet (1977)
- Mohammed Cassim Siddi Lebbe, lawyer, educator, journalist (1977)
- Veera Puran Appu, revolutionary (1978)
- Sir Ernest de Silva, Philanthropist
- D. S. Senanayake, prime minister (1979)
- Piyadasa Sirisena, patriot, writer (1979)
- Swami Vipulananda, philosopher (1979)
- Rowland Hill, postal reformer (1979)
- Henry S. Olcott, Buddhist reformer (1980)
- A. Ratnayake, educator (1980)
- George E. de Silva, politician (1980)
- H. W. Amarasuriya, politician, educationist, proprietor and philanthropist. (1983)
- Dr. E. W. Adikaram, educationist, populariser of science, philosopher, and thinker. (1988)
- Joseph Vaz, Indian Catholic missionary, "Apostle of Sri Lanka" (1992)
- Pope John Paul II, leader of Catholic Church from 16 October 1978 - 2 April 2005 (1995)
- Kithalagama Sri Seelalankara Thera, Buddhist monk (2005)
- Professor Seneka Bibile, pharmacologist, politician (2006)
- Sri Narayana Guru Saint, Social Reformer, Poet KERALA (2009)
- ERabindranath Tagore, poet (2011)
- Dudley Senanayake, politician (2011)
- Eddie Jayamanne, comedian (2012)
- Sandhya Kumari, actress (2012)
- Titus Thotawatte, director, editor (2012)
- Joe Abeywickrama, actor (2012)
- Malini Fonseka, actress (2012)
- Gamini Fonseka, actor (2012)
- Prof. Walpola Rahula Thero, Buddhist monk, scholar and writer (2012)
- Kusuma Gunawardena, politician (2012)
- Swami Vivekananda, Indian Hindu monk (2013)
- Reverend Father Tissa Balasuriya, Roman Catholic priest and theologian (2013)
- Alec Robertson, Buddhist preacher and lecturer (2013)
- Dr. Premasiri Khemadasa, composer (2013)
- Dr. Tissa Abeysekara, filmmaker (2013)
- Dharmadasa Walpola, musician (2013)
- Ven. Baddegama Wimalawansa Nayaka Thero, Buddhist monk (2013)
