= Nawi Samaraweera =

Sri Lankan artist

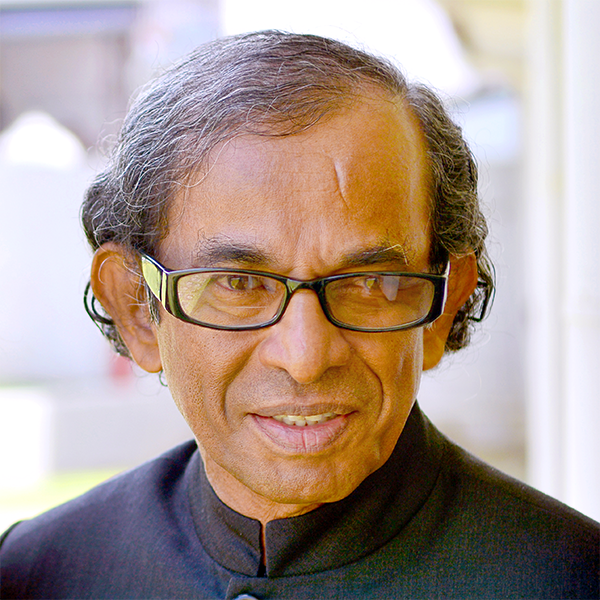
- Born: Nagahawala Wickramage Samaraweera; 26 July 1947 (age 78); Matara, Sri Lanka
- Other names: N.W. Samaraweera; Artist Samaraweera
- Education: BFA (Sculpture) – Institute of Aesthetic Studies, University of Kelaniya, Sri Lanka PGDE – National Institute of Education, Sri Lanka.
- Alma mater: University of Kelaniya, Heywood Institute of Art
- Occupations: Sculptor, painter, art instructor, lecturer
- Known for: Terra-cotta sculpture, cement sculpture, metal embossing, Wooden sculpture, plaster of Paris sculpture, acrylic on canvas, oil on canvas, digital paintings
- Style: Abstract art, modern art
- Children: Sachi Wickramage
- Website: www.ArtistSamaraweera.com

Nawi Samaraweera is a Sri Lankan artist, born 26 July 1947 in Kamburupitiya, Matara.

== Early life ==
He was greatly influenced by his father who was well known for his wood carvings and by the rural village atmosphere he grew up in. Samaraweera entered the Government College of Fine Arts Colombo after secondary education in 1966 and won the Scholarship awarded for the "Best Student" of the college in 1967. In 1969, his dream of sculpting was inspired by the Sri Lankan sculptor Tissa Ranasingha.

== Career as a fine artist ==
In 1970, Samaraweera won his first special award for the sculpture "Abhayabhoomi", from the Ceylon Society of Arts. By 1971 Samaraweera was an active sculptor and graduated from the Government College of Fine Arts Colombo. In the same year, he won the first prize for the Sculpture "Bhikshuwa" at the exhibition of Contemporary Paintings and Sculptures organized for the first time by the Department of Cultural Affairs, Ceylon Society of Arts and by Cultural Council of Ceylon. In 1972, he joined the government service as a Specialized Arts Lecturer.

In 1973, Samaraweera held his maiden solo exhibition at the Samudra Gallery Colombo. Ever since, he has held many successful solo exhibitions in various Art Galleries and Hotels including Alliance Francaise, Heritance Kandalama Hotel and Lighthouse Hotel. Therein, he went on to participate in various Art Exhibitions locally as well as internationally. Samaraweera has won many prizes from competitive Art Exhibitions. In 1988, his wooden sculpture "Kanya", which won a prize at National Paintings & Sculpture (Rajya Chitra Moorthi) Competition, was selected as a permanent display at the National Art Gallery of Sri Lanka.

In 2016, he was awarded at the "Kalabhooshana", National State Awards Ceremony for his special contribution to the development of the Arts, which was organised by the Ministry of Cultural Affairs of Sri Lanka.

Renowned personalities around the world have commended Samaraweera for his contribution to fine-arts. Having dedicated more than 45 years of his life to the advancement of Fine-Art, Samaraweera continues his artistic journey by adapting to the newest trends in the modern mediums of art, such as Digital Paintings on iPad.

== Career timeline ==
- 1966 – Entered the Government College of Fine Arts.
- 1967 – Won the scholarship award for the best student of the College of Fine Arts.
- 1968 – Became a member of the Ceylon Society of Arts.
- 1970 – The special prize for the sculpture "Abhaya Bhoomi" from Ceylon society of Arts.
- 1970 – The painting 'Harvesting' was selected for the Periodical Art Exhibition held by the Ceylon Society of Art s at the National Art Gallery.
- 1971 – Successfully completed the five-year course at Government College of Fine Arts and obtained the Diploma in Sculpture.
- 1971 – The 1st prize for the sculpture "Bhikshuwa" (Wooden Sculpture) at the exhibition of Contemporary Paintings and Sculpture held by the Department of Cultural Affairs.
- 1972 – Joined the public service as a specialized arts lecturer.
- 1973 – The first solo exhibition at the 'Samudra Gallery' of Sri Lankan Tourist Board, Colombo.
- 1973 – Special award for the sculpture 'Martin Wickramasinghe' at the 73rd Annual Art Exhibition held by the Ceylon Society of Arts.
- 1982 – The sculptures 'Mother & Child' and 'Buddhist Monks' were selected as National Entries for participation at the International Art Exhibition in New Delhi, India.
- 1984 – The 1st prize for the sculpture "Samaya" at the Exhibition of International Peace Foundation.
- 1984 – The paintings 'Red Flower' and 'Family Members' was selected for the Specialized Art Teachers Exhibition held by the Ministry of Education.
- 1985 – Special award for the sculpture 'Peace' at the 81st Annual Art Exhibition held by the Ceylon Society of Arts.
- 1985 – Award from the Ceylon Society of Arts at the 81st Annual Art Exhibition for the sculpture 'Mother & Child'.
- 1986 – Award for the painting 'Mother & Child' from "Agaradaguru Sanskruthika Padanama".
- 1986 – Special award for the sculpture 'Buddhist Monk' at the 82nd Annual Art Exhibition held by the Ceylon Society of Arts.
- 1986 – Award for the sculpture 'Wave' from Ministry of Cultural Affairs.
- 1987 – The 1st prize for the sculpture "Family Group" at the exhibition of specialized art teachers of the Ministry of Education
- 1988 – Selected the sculpture "Kanya" for permanent display at the National Art Gallery, Colombo.
- 1989 – Participated in the International Exhibition of Asian Arts biennale, Bangladesh as the only representative from Sri Lanka in the section of sculpture.
- 1990 – 2nd Prize for the sculpture 'Bull' at the Specialist Art Teachers' Exhibition held by the Ministry of Education and Higher Education
- 1990 – 3rd Prize for the sculpture 'Mother & Child' at the Centenary Art Exhibition held by the Ceylon Society of Arts
- 1990 – 3rd Prize for the sculpture 'A tomorrow for us' at the State Sculpture & Paintings Exhibition held by the Council of Arts, Sri Lanka.
- 1990 – Special award for the sculpture 'Upasaka' at the Centenary Art Exhibition held by the Ceylon Society of Arts.
- 1990 – Special awards for the sculptures 'The crying cock' and 'The composition' at the Specialist Art Teachers' Exhibition held by the Ministry of Education and Higher Education.
- 1990 – Awards for Wooden Sculpture from the Council of Arts, Sri Lanka.
- 1990 – One man exhibition at the Alliance Française, Colombo.
- 1997 – One man exhibition at the Heritance Kandalama Hotel, Dambulla.
- 1998 – Participated for the Independence Golden Jubilee Painting and Sculpture Exhibition held by the Department of Cultural Affairs and Council of Arts, Sri Lanka.
- 1999 – One man exhibition at the Heritance Kandalama Hotel, Dambulla.
- 2001 – One man exhibition at the Heritance Kandalama Hotel, Dambulla.
- 2004 – One man exhibition at the Lighthouse Hotel, Galle.
- 2013 – Launched 'Gallery 21' in Matara Residence
- 2014 – Ventured into 'Digital painting' on iPad
- 2016 – Awarded at the "Kalabhooshana", National State Awards Ceremony for his special contribution to the development of the Arts, which was organised by the Ministry of Cultural Affairs of Sri Lanka.
- 2017 – Listed amongst the "10 Sri Lankan Artists You Should Know", by the Culture Trip Magazine.
