= M. J. S. Wijeyaratne =

M.J.S. Wijeyaratne

Vice Chancellor of the University of Kelaniya Chairman of Committee of Vice-Chancellors and Directors Chairman of Board of Management, Postgraduate Institute of Archaeology Council Member of Association of Commonwealth Universities. General President of Sri Lanka Association for the Advancement of Science
- In office July 2005 – October 2008

Personal details
- Born: 4 August 1952 (age 74) Colombo
- Spouse: Senani Wijeyaratne
- Children: Dimuthu Wijeyaratne, Pubudu Wijeyaratne
- Education: University of Michigan, University of Kelaniya, Royal College Colombo
- Profession: Academic

M. J. S. Wijeyaratne is a Sri Lankan academic. He was the Vice-Chancellor of University of Kelaniya and Professor of Zoology.

Educated at Royal College Colombo, Prof. Wijeyaratne gained a BSc in Zoology from the University of Kelaniya and gained a MSc from the University of Michigan and return to the University of Kelaniya to complete his PhD.

Joining the University of Kelaniya as a lecturer he served as Head of the Department of Zoology and thereafter Dean of the Faculty of Science and Director of the Staff Development Unit of the University of Kelaniya. He was also the Director of the Local Technical Secretariat of the World Bank funded Improvement of Relevance and Quality of Undergraduate Education (IRQUE) project of the Ministry of Education and Higher Education at the University of Kelaniya. From 2005 to 2008 he served as Vice-Chancellor.

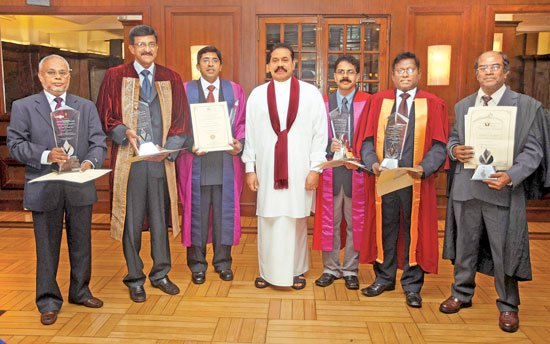
Recipients of CVCD Excellence Awards 2010

He was also a Chairman of the Committee of Vice-Chancellors and Directors. A fulbright scholar, he is a Fellow of the National Academy of Sciences and the Institute of Biology of Sri Lanka.

Currently he is the Senior Professor and Chair of Zoology in the Department of Zoology and Environmental Management and Chairman of the Research Council of the University of Kelaniya. He is also the Chairman of the National Science and Technology Commission of Sri Lanka.

He had served as a member of the Boards of Governors of many National Institutions in Sri Lanka. These include the National Aquatic Resources Research and Development Agency, National Institute of Fisheries and Nautical Engineering, Arthur C Clarke Institute of Modern Technology, National Science Foundation of Sri Lanka, Sri Lanka Standards Institution and Industrial Technology Institute. Currently he is a member of the Governing Board of the National Institute of Fundamental Studies, Council member of the National Academy of Sciences, Sri Lanka, Chairman of the Research Advisory Board of the National Science Foundation and the Chairman of the Board of Study of the Sri Lanka Institute of Marketing.

He had also been the Chairman of the Oceanography and Marine Sciences Committee of the National Science Foundation and member of its several committees including Working Committee on Biological Sciences. Currently, he is a member of its Science Technology Engineering and Mathematics Education Committee and the Policy Research Committee of the National Science Foundation.

He is the Founder President of Sri Lanka Association for Fisheries and Aquatic Resources and the Founder President of the Alumni Association of the Faculty of Science of the University of Kelaniya. He had also been the General President of the Sri Lanka Association for the Advancement of Science and the Institute of Biology of Sri Lanka. Further, he has also served as the General Secretary of the National Academy of Science, Sri Lanka.

He has been involved in quality assurance activities of the higher education system of Sri Lanka since 2002. As the Deputy Director of the World Bank funded HETC project, he was a key figure in developing the Sri Lanka Qualifications Framework. He is a well experienced quality assurance reviewer in higher education and has carried out 19 quality assurance reviews in Sri Lankan and Bangladesh Universities. He has also participated as a resource person in 54 quality assurance training workshops.

He has carried out a large amount of research on Fish Biology, Fisheries Management, Aquatic Biology and Aquatic Resources Management. He has published 93 research papers in peer reviewed indexed journals and 12 text books. He has made 89 presentations in national and international conferences including 06 Keynote addresses and 02 Convocation Addresses.

He is the recipient of the Fellowship on Conservation and Sustainable Development awarded by the University of Michigan, USA. In 1990, he was awarded the Third World Academy of Sciences Prize for the best young scientist in Biology in Sri Lanka. In 2010 he was awarded the prestigious Lifetime Award for the Most Outstanding Senior Researcher in Biology by the Committee of Vice-Chancellors and Directors of Sri Lanka. He has also won Presidential Awards for Research publications in several years.

== Research publications ==
1. De Silva, S.S. & M.J.S. Wijeyaratne (1977) Studies on the young grey mullet Mugil cephalus L. ll - Food and Feeding. Aquaculture, 12: 157 – 168..
2. De Silva, S.S., Kortmulder, K. and M.J.S. Wijeyaratne (1977) A comparative study of the food and feeding habits of Puntius bimaculatus and P. titteya. Netherland Journal of Zoology, 27: 253 - 263.
3. Wijeyaratne, M.J.S. and H.H. Costa (1981) stocking rate estimates of Tilapia mossambica fingerlings for some inland reservoirs of Sri Lanka. Internationale Revue gesamten Hidrobiologia, 66: 327 - 333.
4. Amarasinghe, U.S., H.H. Costa and M.J.S. Wijeyaratne (1983). Limnology and fish production potential of major freshwater reservoirs in Anuradhapura District. Journal of Inland Fisheries, 2: 14 - 29
5. Wijeyaratne, M.J.S. (1984). Problems associated with quantification of stocking. In. Report of the Second Session of the Indo-Pacific Fisheries Commission Working Party on Inland Fisheries. FAO Fisheries Report, 312: 53 - 56.
6. Edirisinghe, E.A.D.N.D. and M.J.S. Wijeyaratne, (1986). Food resource partitioning among the fishes co-existing in brush parks, an artificial habitat in a lagoon in Sri Lanka. Journal of Inland fisheries, 3: 115 - 125.
7. Wijeyaratne, M.J.S. and Costa, H.H. (1986) Application of "yield per recruit" and "surplus yield" models to the grey mullet fishery in Negombo lagoon, Sri Lanka, Journal of Inland Fisheries, 3: 3 - 14.
8. Wijeyaratne, M.J.S. (1986) Exploitation of fin fish resources of lagoons and estuaries in Sri Lanka. In. (ed.) Weerasinghe S.G.M. Silver Jubilee Commemorative Volume of the University of Kelaniya, University of Kelaniya, Sri Lanka 185 - 189.
9. Wijeyaratne, M.J.S. and H.H. Costa (1987) On the biology of an estuarine population of grey mullet Mugil cephalus L. in Negombo lagoon Sri Lanka. Cybium, 10(4): 351 - 363.
10. Wijeyaratne, M.J.S. and H.H.Costa (1987) Fishery, seasonal abundance and mortality of grey mullets (Pisces - Mugilidae) in Negombo lagoon, Sri Lanka. Journal of Applied Ichthyology, 3: 115 - 118.
11. Wijeyaratne, M.J.S. and H.H. Costa (1987) The food, feeding and reproduction in an estuarine population of green back mullet, Liza tade (Forskal) in the Negombo lagoon, Sri Lanka. Ophelia, 27(3): 171 - 180.
12. Wijeyaratne, M.J.S. and H.H Costa (1987) The biology of grey mullets in a tropical lagoon in Sri Lanka. I - Age and Growth. Mahasagar, 20(3): 163 - 170.
13. Wijeyaratne, M.J.S. and H.H. Costa (1987) On the management of fin fish fishery of Negombo lagoon. Indian Journal of Fisheries, 34(1): 41 - 47.
14. Wijeyaratne, M.J.S. and H.H. Costa (1987) The food, feeding and reproduction of Borneo mullet, Liza macrolepis in a coastal estuary in Sri Lanka. Indian Journal of Fisheries, 34 (3): 283-291.
15. Wijeyaratne, M.J.S. and U.S. Amarasinghe, (1987) Estimations of maximum sustainable fish yields and stocking densities of fish fingerlings in freshwater lakes and reservoirs. Arch. Hydrobiol. Beih. 28: 305-308.
16. Wijeyaratne, M.J.S. and H.H. Costa (1988). The food, fecundity and gonadal maturity of Valamugil cunnesius (Pisces - Mugilidae) in the Negombo lagoon. Indian Journal of Fisheries, 35 (2): 71 - 77.
17. Daniel, D.J., H.H. Costa and M.J.S. Wijeyaratne (1988) Hydrobiology and fish production potential of major freshwater reservoirs in Hambantota district. Journal of Inland Fisheries, 4: 95-121.
18. Wijeyaratne, M.J.S. and H.H. Costa, (1988). Reproductive strategy and feeding of Dussumier's mullet, Liza dussumieri Valenciennes from a coastal lagoon in Sri Lanka. Journal of Inland Fisheries, 4: 31-41.
19. Wijeyaratne, M.J.S. and R.S. Gunawardena, (1988) Chemotherapy of ectoparasite Ergasilus ceylonensis on the Asian cichlid Etroplus suratensis. Journal of Applied Ichthyology, 4 (2): 97 - 100.
20. Costa, H.H. and M.J.S. Wijeyaratne (1989) Epidemiology of the epizootic ulcerative syndrome occurring for the first time among fish in Sri Lanka. Journal of Applied Ichthyology, 5 (1): 48 - 52.
21. Wijeyaratne, M.J.S. (1989) Food intake and food conversion efficiency of the snakehead Ophiocephalus striatus Bloch in a peaty swamp in Sri Lanka. In E.A. Huisman, Z. Zonneveld and A.H.M. Bowmann (eds.) Aquaculture Research in Asia: Management Techniques and Nutrition, Pudoc Wageningen, 261 - 267.
22. Wijeyaratne, M.J.S. & Costa, H.H. (1990) Food and feeding of two species of grey mullets Valamugil buchanani (Bleeker) and Liza vaigiensis Quoy and Gaimard inhabiting brackish water environments in Sri Lanka. Indian Journal of Fisheries, 37(3): 211 - 219.
23. Wijeyaratne, M.J.S. (1990). An experimental study on the culture of Channa striata using a population of Puntius vittatus as food In Hirano R. and I. Hanyu (eds.) The second Asian Fisheries Forum. Asian Fisheries Society, Manila, Philippines. 205 - 208.
24. Chandrasoma, J. and M.J.S. Wijeyaratne (1990) Some aspects of the biology of Hyporhampus gaimardi in Uda Walawe reservoir, a man made lake in Sri Lanka. In Hirano, R. and I. Hanyu (eds). The Second Asian Fisheries Forum, Asian Fisheries Society, Manila, Philippines. 569 - 572.
25. Karunasinghe, N. and M.J.S. Wijeyaratne (1991) Population dynamics of trenched sardine Amblygaster sirm (clupeidae) in the western coastal waters of Sri Lanka. Asian Fisheries Science, 4: 329 - 334.
26. Wijeyaratne, M.J.S., (1991). Management of living aquatic resources of Sri Lanka. Proceedings of Sri Lanka Association for the Advancement of Science. 47(2): 43-66.
27. Karunasinghe, W.P.N. and M.J.S. Wijeyaratne (1991) Selectivity estimates for Amblygaster sirm (Clupeidae) in the small meshed gill net fishery on the west coast of Sri Lanka. Fisheries Research, 10: 199 - 205.
28. Wijeyaratne, M.J.S. and H.H. Costa (1992) Resource partitioning of two commercially important cichlid species in three minor perennial reservoirs in the Northwestern province of Sri Lanka. Journal of Aquaculture in the Tropics. 7: 131-180
29. Wijeyaratne, M.J.S. (1992) Sustainable exploitation of brackishwater fishery resources of Sri Lanka In K. Tillekeratne, C. Dahanayake, S.P.B. Wickramasooriya and I.V.S. Fernando (eds.) Silver Jubillee Commemorative Volume, Faculty of Science, University of Kelaniya, Sri Lanka. 41 - 48
30. Wijeyaratne, M.J.S. (1993) Conservation of freshwater fish biodiversity in Sri Lanka. Conservation and Sustainable Development, The University of Michigan 1: 61-75.
31. Wijeyaratne, M.J.S. (1993) Biology of harvesting fishery resource in Sri Lanka at the maximum sustainable level, Conservation and Sustainable Development, The University of Michigan 1: 17-24.
32. Wijeyaratne, M.J.S. (1993) Conservation and management of estuarine sea grass and mangrove habitats in Sri Lanka. Conservation and Sustainable Development, The University of Michigan 1: 33-40.
33. Wijeyaratne, M.J.S. (1993) Conservation and management of Senanayake Samudra reservoir ecosystem in Sri Lanka. Case Studies in Conservation and Sustainable Development, The University of Michigan 1: 86-106.
34. Wijeyaratne, M.J.S. and W.M.D.S.K. Perera (1993) Present status of the seine fishery of Negombo lagoon. Vidyodaya Journal of Science, 4 (1 & 2) :
35. Chandrasoma, J. and M.J.S. Wijeyaratne (1994) Impact of stocking of exotic carps in Giritale Tank, a man made lake in Sri Lanka. In L.M. Chou et al., (eds), The Third Asian Fisheries Forum, Asian Fisheries Society, Manila, Philippines. 258 – 261,
36. Wijeyaratne, M.J.S. (1994). Some aspects of the biology of the snakehead, Ophicephalus striatus Bloch in Muthurajawela, a peaty swamp in Sri Lanka. Vidyodaya Journal of Science. 5(1): 175-182.
37. Wijeyaratne, M.J.S. (1994). Aquaculture production potential of Ophicephalus striatus Bloch in a peaty swamp in Sri Lanka. In L. M. Chou et al., (Eds) The Third Asian Fisheries Forum, Asian Fisheries Society, Manila, Philippines, 50-53.
38. Wijeyaratne, M.J.S. (1994). Growth, reproduction and mortality of Ophicephalus striatus Bloch in a peaty swamp in Sri Lanka. In L.M. Chou et al., (eds). The Third Asian Fisheries Forum, Asian Fisheries Society, Manila, Philippines. 476-479.
39. Karunasinghe, W. P. N. and M.J.S.Wijeyaratne (1995). On the exploitation of the trenched sardine, Amblygaster sirm (Walbaum) off Negombo coast. Journal of National Science Council of Sri Lanka. 23 (1): 1-8.
40. Costa, H.H. and M.J.S. Wijeyaratne (1995). The effects of leaving central bare areas in traditional circular brushparks on the yield of fish in the brushpark fishery in Negombo estuary, Sri Lanka. ECOSET'95. Japan International Marine Science and Technology Federation, 784-789.
41. Costa, H.H. and M.J.S. Wijeyaratne (1996). The effects of utilization of different species of mangroves as construction material on the yield of fish in the brush park fishery of Negombo estuary, Sri Lanka. Journal of Applied Ichthyology, 10 (2,3), 96-103.
42. Wijeyaratne, M.J.S., W.S. Weliange and U.S. Amarasinghe (1996). Population dynamics of vermiculated rabbit fish Siganus vermiculatus (Valenciennes) in the Negombo estuary, Sri Lanka. Sri Lanka Journal of Aquatic Sciences, 1: 59 - 69.
43. Karunasinghe, W.P.N. and M.J.S. Wijeyaratne (1996). Effects of monsoonal currents, rainfall and lunar phase on the abundance of Amblygaster sirm in the coastal waters off Sri Lanka. Sri Lanka Journal of Aquatic Sciences, 1: 53 - 58.
44. Gamlath, G.A.R.K. and M.J.S. Wijeyaratne (1997). Indicator organisms of environmental conditions in a lotic water body in Sri Lanka - Short communication. Sri Lanka Journal of Aquatic Sciences, 2: 121 - 129.
45. Wijeyaratne, M.J.S. (1997). Cage culture of the snakehead Ophicephalus striatus in a peaty swamp in Sri Lanka In. Zhou, et al. (eds). The Fourth Asian Fisheries Forum. Asian Fisheries Society, Manila, Philippines, 37-40.
46. Karunasinghe, W.P.N. and M.J.S.Wijeyaratne (1998). Reproductive biology of the trenched sardine Amblygaster sirm (Walbaum) from the western coastal waters of Sri Lanka. Ceylon Journal of Science (Bio Science), 25: 35 – 51.
47. Silva, E I L and M J S Wijeyaratne, (1999). The occurrence of cyanobacteria in the reservoirs of the Mahaweli River Basin in Sri Lanka. Sri Lanka Journal of Aquatic Sciences, 4: 51 – 60.
48. Wijeyaratne, M.J.S. and W.M.D.S.K. Perera, (2000). Studies on the feasibility of using indigenous fishes for controlling aquatic macrophytes in Sri Lanka. Journal of Aquaculture in the Tropics. 15 (3): 253 – 260.
49. Kithsiri, H.M.P., M.J.S. Wijeyaratne and U.S. Amarasinghe (2000). Influence of some environmental factors on the abundance of three commercially important bivalve species (Family: Veneridae) in the Puttalam lagoon and Dutch bay, Sri Lanka. Sri Lanka Journal of Aquatic Sciences. 5 : 27-38.
50. Ganegama Arachchi, G.J., J.M.P.K. Jayasinghe, M.J.S. Wijeyaratne, M. Jayasooriya and K. Hettiarachchi, (2000). Handling practices and post-harvest losses of tuna catches from multi-day boats operating from the fish landing site Negombo, Sri Lanka. Sri Lanka Journal of Aquatic Sciences, 5: 87 – 96.
51. Wijeyaratne, M.J.S. and W.M.D.S.K. Perera, (2001). Population dynamics of potential fish species for exploitation in presently underexploited fisheries of some perennial reservoirs of Sri Lanka. In. S.S. De Silva (ed.) Reservoir and Culture-based Fisheries: Biology and Management. Australian Centre for International Agricultural Research, Canberra. 188-200.
52. Wijeyaratne, M.J.S., (2001). Coastal wetland uses and related problems in Muthurajawela marsh, Negombo lagoon and Chilaw lagoon. In. N. Farmer (ed.) Proceedings of the Workshop on Effective management for Biodiversity Conservation in Sri Lankan Coastal Wetlands: Muturajawela marsh, Negombo lagoon and Chilaw lagoon. Report 55. Centre for the Economics and Management of Aquatic Resources, University of Portsmouth, U.K.
53. D.Weerasooriya, T.K.Hewapathirana and M.J.S.Wijeyaratne, (2001). Formal sector financing on the marine fish production and socioeconomics of fishers in Sri Lanka, Vidyodaya Journal of Science, 9: 87 -96.
54. Wijeyaratne, M.J.S. and W.M.D.S.K. Perera, (2001). Trophic interrelationships among indigenous and exotic fish species co-occurring in inland reservoirs in Sri Lanka. Asian Fisheries Science, 14(3): 333-342.
55. Shirantha, R.R.A.R. and M.J.S.Wijeyaratne, (2002). Diurnal variation in food resource partitioning among some co-occurring fishes in the Negombo estuary of Sri Lanka. Ceylon Journal of Science (Bio Science), 29: 25-38.
56. Fernando, CH, R.R.A.R. Shirantha, M.J.S. Wijeyaratne and R. Cumaranatunga (2002). Tilapia and indigenous fish biodiversity. Sri Lanka Journal of Aquatic Sciences 7:1-22
57. Kithsiri, H.M.P. M.J.S. Wijeyaratne and U.S. Amarasinghe (2004). Population dynamics of three commercially important bivalve species (Family: Veneridae) in Puttalam lagoon and Dutch Bay, Sri Lanka Journal of Aquatic Sciences 9:13-30
58. Costa, H.H., W.M.T.B. Wanninayaka and M.J.S. Wijeyaratne (2004) The Limnology of Ihalagama wewa, a minor perennial reservoir in the wet zone of Sri Lanka, with special reference to the production of Oreochromis mossambicus and Etroplus suratensis. Spolia Zeylanica 41: 1-29
59. Wijeyaratne, M.J.S. and Krishanthi Ponnamperuma (2005). Reproductive Biology and Population dynamics of red side barb (Puntius bimaculatus) and indigenous cyprinid in Sri Lanka. Ceylon Journal of Science (Bio Science) 33:55-65
60. Shirantha R.R.A.R., M.J.S. Wijeyaratne and U.S. Amarasinghe (2005). Food niche overlap among co-occurring endemic freshwater fish in Sri Lanka. Sri Lanka Journal of Aquatic Sciences 10: 19-34
61. Sasikala, A., M.J.S.Wijeyaratne and J.M.P.K. Kayasinghe (2005). Histamine levels in fishery products imported to Sri Lanka. Indian Journal of Fisheries 52 (4): 385-395
62. Kumudinie, O.M.C. and M.J.S. Wijeyaratne (2005) Feasibility of controlling accidentally introduced invasive species Chitala ornata in Sri Lanka. Verhandlungen des Internationalen Verein Limnologie. 29: 1025 – 1027.
63. Kusumawathie, P.H.D., A.R. Wickremasinghe, N.D. Karunaweera and M.J.S. Wijeyaratne (2006) Larvivorous potential of fish species found in river bed pools below the major dams in Sri Lanka. Journal of Medical Entomology 43(1): 79-82
64. Dahanayaka, D.D.G.L. and M.J.S. Wijeyaratne (2006). Diversity of macrobenthic community in the Negombo estuary, Sri Lanka with special reference to environmental conditions, Sri Lanka Journal of Aquatic Sciences 11: 43-61.
65. Amarasinghe, U.S., R.R.A.R. Shirantha and M.J.S. Wijeyaratne (2006). Some aspects of ecology of endemic freshwater fishes of Sri Lanka. pp. 113–124. In. C.N.B. Bambaradeniya (ed.). The Fauna of Sri Lanka: Status of Taxonomy, Research and Conservation. The World Conservation Union, Sri Lanka and the Government of Sri Lanka. 308 pp.
66. . Kusumawathie, P.H.D., A.R. Wickremasinghe, N.D. Karunaweera, M.J.S. Wijeyaratne and A.M.G.M. Yapabandara (2006). Anopheline breeding in river bed pools below major dams in Sri Lanka. Acta Tropica 99(1): 30-33 pp.
67. Epa, U.P.K., M.J.S. Wijeyaratne and S.S.De Silva (2007) A comparison of proximate composition and water stability of three selected shrimp feeds used in Sri Lanka. Asian Fisheries Science 20: 7-22.
68. D.C.T. Dissanayake and M.J.S. Wijeyaratne (2007) Studies on the sea cucumberfishery in the northwestern coastal region of Sri Lanka. Sri Lanka Journal of Aquatic Sciences 12: 19- 38
69. Kusumawathie, P.H.D., A.R. Wickremasinghe, N.D. Karunaweera and M.J.S. Wijeyaratne (2008) Larvivorous potential of the Guppy, Poecilia reticulata in anophelene mosquito control in riverbed pools below the Kotmale dam, Sri Lanka. Asia-Pacific Journal of Public Health 20 (1): 56-63
70. Kusumawathie, P.H.D., A.R. Wickremasinghe, N.D. Karunaweera and M.J.S.Wijeyaratne (2008) Cost and effectiveness of application of Poecilia reticulate (Guppy) and temephos in anopheline mosquito control in riverbasins below the major dams in Sri Lanka. Transactions of the Royal Society of Tropical Medicine and Hygiene 102:705-711
71. Dahanayaka, D.D.G.L., S.C. Jayamanne & M.J.S. Wijeyaratne (2008) Benthic Invertebrates of a Tropical Estuary in the Western Coast of Sri Lanka, Proceedings of International Conference on Environmental Research & Technology, 28–30 May 2008 Parkroyal Penang, Malaysia: 476-481 pp.
72. Epa, U.P.K. and M.J.S. Wijeyaratne (2008) Should shrimp culture be blamed? The interactions of diverse natural resources utilization in shrimp culture. Journal of Science, University of Kelaniya, Sri Lanka, 4: 21-35
73. Wijeyaratne, M.J.S. (2009) Borderless education: Challenges and opportunities for Sri Lankan universities. In A.A.D. Amarasekera, Piyadasa Ranasinghe and W. Joe Perera (Eds) Kalyana Deeepani, Alumni Association of the University of Kelaniya, 20-32.
74. Wijeyaratne M.J.S. and P.M.C. Thilakarathne (2009) Performance indicators for Sri Lankan universities, In Kulatilleka Kumarasinghe et al. (Eds) Golden Jubilee Commemorative Volume of the University of Kelaniya, University of Kelaniya, Kelaniya, Sri Lanka 788-801.
75. Dissanayaka, D.M.P.R. and M.J.S. Wijeyaratne (2009) Impact of women involvement in fisheries on socioeconomics of fisher households in Negombo, Sri Lanka. Sri Lanka Journal of Aquatic Sciences 14: 45-57
76. Jayawickrema, E.M. and M.J.S. Wijeyaratne (2009) Distribution and population dynamics of the edible bivalve species Meretrix casta (Chemnitz) in the Dutch Canal of Sri Lanka. Sri Lanka Journal of Aquatic Sciences 14: 29-44.
77. Wijeyaratne, M.J.S. (2009) The role of scientists and scientific organizations, Guest Editorial, Chemistry in Sri Lanka 26 (3): 5-6.
78. Dahanayaka D.D.G.L., M.J.S. Wijeyaratne and S.C. Jayamanne (2009) Macrobenthic Community Structure in Relation to Land Based Pollution – Case Study in a Tropical Estuary in the West Coast of Sri Lanka. Proceedings of the 5th International Student Conference at Ibaraki University, Ibaraki, JAPAN, November 7–8, 2009, 117-118
79. Wijeyaratne, M.J.S. (2010) Science education for sustainable development. Proceedings of the 65th Annual Scientific Sessions of the Sri Lanka Association for the Advancement of Science, Part II. 65(II), Sri Lanka Association for the Advancement of Science, Colombo, Sri Lanka, 1-5.
80. Wijeyaratne, M.J.S. (2011) Frontiers of research for the sustainability of rapid economic development envisaged in post-war Sri Lanka. Proceedings of the eighth academic Sessions of the University of Ruhuna, 1-5.
81. Dahanayaka, D.D.G.L., H. Tonooka, M.J.S. Wijeyaratne, A. Minato, and S. Ozawa (2011) Change detection in the channel segment of Negombo Estuary, Sri Lanka using time series satellite data and its possible impacts on estuarine productivity, The Ninth Asian Fisheries and Aquaculture Forum, The Asian Fisheries Society, 156-157 pp.
82. US Amarasinghe, IU Wickramaratne, MJS Wijeyaratne (2011) Hook selectivity of Giant Trevally (Caranx ignobilis) and Naked-breast Trevally (Carangoides gymnostethus) (Carangidae) caught in the hook-and-line fishery off Negombo, Sri Lanka, Sri Lanka Journal of Aquatic Sciences 16: 11-26. 84. Dahanayaka D.D.G.L., H. Tonooka, M.J.S. Wijeyaratne, A. Minato and S. Ozawa (2012) Monitoring land use changes and their impacts on the productivity of Negombo Estuary, Sri Lanka using time series satellite data, Asian Fisheries Science 25: 197-212.
83. Dahanayaka, D.D.G.L., Hideyuki Tonooka, M.J.S. Wijeyaratne, Atsushi Minato and Satoru Ozawa (2013) Two decadal trends of surface chlorophyll-a concentrations in tropical lagoon environments in Sri Lanka using satellite and in-situ data, Asian Journal of Geoinformatics 13(3): 15-25.
84. Amaraweera, K.W.R.R., M.J.S. Wijeyaratne and S.C. Jayamanne (2013) Growth and survival of post-larvae of giant freshwater prawn (Macrobrachium rosenbergii) reared using feeds formulated with different sources of protein. Sri Lanka Journal of Aquatic Sciences 18: 17-26.
85. Dahanayaka, D.D.G.L., Hideyuki Tonooka, Jayantha Wijeyaratne, Atsushi Minato & Satoru Ozawa (2015) Comparison of three chlorophyll-a estimation approaches using ASTER data acquired over Sri Lankan coastal water bodies, Malaysian Journal of Remote Sensing & GIS (MJRS&GIS), 4(1): 21-29. http://www.igrsm.com/mjrsgis/issues.html
86. Wijeyaratne, M.J.S. and S.M.A.I. Sangakkara (2015). Development and application of wetland zooplankton index to assess the degree of eutrophication in Sri Lankan reservoirs. International Journal of Aquatic Biology 3(4) 208-217. http://www.npajournals.com/ijab/index.php/ijab/article/view/346/277
87. S.M.A.I.Sangakkara ad M.J.S.Wijeyaratne (2015) Community structure of zooplankton and trophic status of some inland reservoirs in the low country intermediate zone of Sri Lanka. Sri Lanka Journal of Aquatic Sciences 20 (2): 59-74.

== Text Books ==
1. Wijeyaratne, M.J.S., 1981, Freshwater fish culture. Lake House Investments and Publishers Ltd., Colombo, Sri Lanka. 41 pp.
2. Wijeyaratne, M.J.S., 1987, Economic Zoology - The parasites. Lake House Investments and Publishers Ltd., Colombo, Sri Lanka. 84 pp.
3. Wijeyaratne, M.J.S., 1991. Human Biology. University Grants Commission, Colombo, Sri Lanka, 231 pp.
4. Wijeyaratne, M.J.S., 1992. Basic Histology. Lake house Investments and Publishers Ltd., Colombo, Sri Lanka. 171 pp.
5. Wijeyaratne, M.J.S., 1996. Fish and Fisheries Biology. The Open University of Sri Lanka, Nawala, Nugegoda, Sri Lanka. 185 pp.
6. Wijeyaratne, M.J.S., 1996. Ecology. Education Publications Department, Battaramulla, Sri Lanka. 89 pp.
7. Ratnasooriya, W D., M.J.S. Wijeyaratne and W.U. Chandrasekera, 1996. Evolution. Education Publications Department, Sri Lanka. 75 pp.
8. Hewapathirana, Tamara K., and M.J.S. Wijeyaratne, 2001. Basic Statistics for Biology. Collins Publications, Colombo, Sri Lanka. 64 pp.
9. Hewapathirana, Tamara K., and M.J.S. Wijeyaratne, 2002. Basic Statistics I – Descriptive Statistics. Collins Publications, Colombo, Sri Lanka. 113 pp
10. Pathiratne, A. and M.J.S. Wijeyaratne, 2003. Functioning Animal I. S Godage and Brothers, Colombo, Sri Lanka. 118 pp
11. Pathiratne A. and M.J.S. Wijeyaratne Functioning Animal II. S. Godage and Brothers. Colombo, Sri Lanka. 180 pp
12. M.J.S. Wijeyaratne and U.S.Amarasinghe (2008) (Eds) Participatory Approaches to Reservoir Fisheries Management: Issues, Challenges and Policies. Sri Lanka Association for Fisheries and Aquatic Resources. 235pp

Academic offices
Preceded by Thilakaratne Kapugamage	Vice Chancellor of the University of Kelaniya; 2005-2008	Succeeded by Sarath Amunugama
