= Chamindi Dilkushi Senaratne Wettewe =

- Education: University of Kelaniya Radboud University Nijmegen
- Known for: "Sinhala-English code mixing in Sri Lanka, a sociolinguistic study"
- Scientific career
- Fields: English Language
- Institutions: University of Kelaniya

Chamindi Dilkushi Senaratne (Wettewe) is a Professor in English Language Teaching at the English Language Teaching Unit of the University of Kelaniya in Sri Lanka. She completed her PhD at Radboud University, Nijmegen in the Netherlands. Her research interests are contact linguistics, sociolinguistics and bilingualism. She was Head of the English Language Teaching Unit at the University of Kelaniya from 2010 to 2014. Currently, she is the Director of the Staff Development Center at the University of Kelaniya. She is the author of Sinhala-English code mixing in Sri Lanka, a sociolinguistic study, which was published by Netherlands Graduate Institute of Linguistics (LOT) and Discourse Strategies of Sri Lankan bilinguals, which was published by Godage International Publishers, Sri Lanka.
