= Nawi =

Nawi may refer to:

- Nawa, Daraa, Ottoman name for this Syrian city
- Nawi, a barangay of Paranas, Samar, Philippines
- Nawi (film), 2024 Kenyan film

== People with the name ==
=== Given name ===
- Nawi Ismail (1918–1990), Indonesian film director and actor
- Nawi Mohamad (born 1963), Malaysian politician
- Nawi Samaraweera (born 1947), Sri Lankan artist

=== Surname ===
- Eli Nawi, Israeli Paralympic rower
- Eliyahu Nawi (1920–2012), Israeli politician
- Ezra Nawi (1951–2021), Israeli human rights activist
- Iwan Nawi, Taiwanese politician
- Nazrin Nawi (born 1988), Malaysian footballer
- Roy Nawi (born 2004), Israeli footballer
