= St. Mary's Convent (Convent of Mary Immaculate) =

- Matara; Sri Lanka

Information
- Type: All-Girls government school.
- Motto: looking at the star
- Established: 1908
- Grades: 1–13
- Enrollment: Over 4000
- Colors: Light Blue and Yellow
- Website: stmcm.com

The Sisters of Charity of Jesus and Mary came to Galle, Sri Lanka in 1896 for more than 11 years, there was only one house of the SCJM in Galle. The second foundation was proposed from 1906 especially by M. Tiburce De Mol Superior of Galle. In collaboration with the Jesuits the sisters, started the work, and by 1908, they finished the convent and the school. on 15 April 1908 Sr. Josephine Halewijn and Sr. Livine Van Brabant left for Matara with four orphans in order to make last minutes arrangements. Fr. Van Antwerpen S. J. the parish priest history
