= Tilake Abeysinghe =

Sri Lankan artist

Cavaliere Tilake Abeysinghe
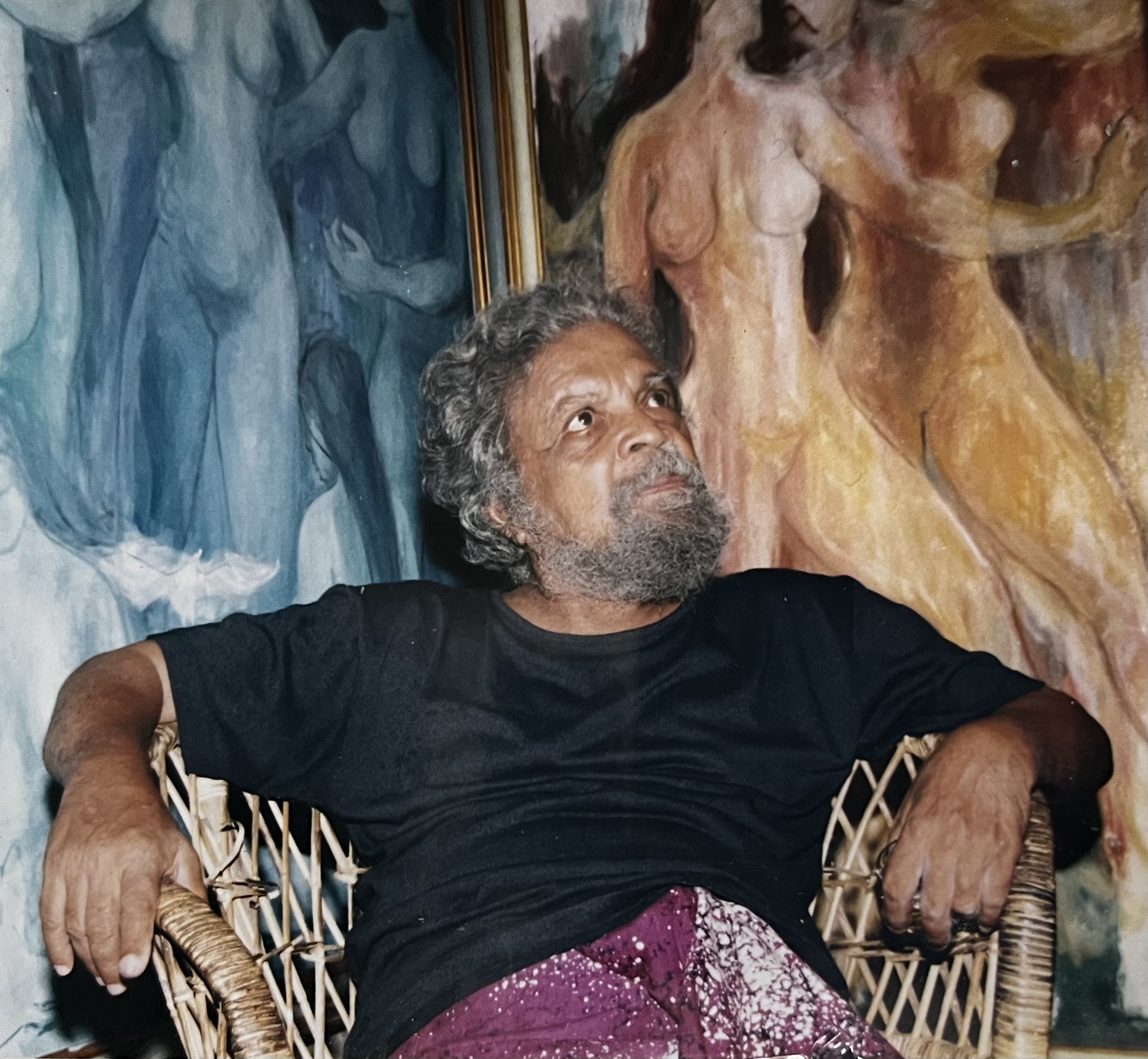
- Born: Gunatilake Samaratunga Abeysinghe; 28 March 1929; Hakmana, British Ceylon
- Died: 24 September 2022 (aged 93); Toronto, Canada
- Education: Brera Academy
- Occupations: Painter, sculptor
- Years active: 1951-2022
- Spouse: Padma Abeysinghe
- Children: 7
- Website: https://tilakefoundation.org

Tilake Abeysinghe (Sinhala: කැවාලියර් තිලක අබේසිංහ; Tamil: காவலியர் திலகே அபேசிங்க; 28 March 1929 – 24 September 2022), better known as Tilake, was an internationally reputed Sri Lankan painter and sculptor. Using traditional media such as oil on canvas and water colours, and sculpting in bronze, cement, clay and plaster-of-paris, Tilake fused oriental ethos with western sensuality in his art pieces. Tilake created abstract, semi-abstract and feminine form inspired paintings and sculptures.

Tilake Abeysinghe died at age 93 in his home in Toronto, Canada.

== Early life ==
Tilake, was born in Hakmana, British Ceylon as Gunatilake Samaratunga Abeysinghe. Tilake was the nickname his wife Padma fondly called him and the name he would eventually use throughout his life. Tilake lost his mother during the birth of her second child when he was 2 years old. When Tilake was 10 years old, his father, a village school principal, was poisoned, leaving him an orphan. Tilake's grandmother raised him and paid for his education at Rahula College in Matara before he attended St. Sylvester's College in Kandy for his advanced studies.

St. Sylvester's College, run by Benedictine monks, exposed Tilake to Christian artwork and culture all the while he was visiting Buddhist temples such as Degaldoruwa Raja Maha Vihara which harboured Kandyan style murals. He also was inspired by the wood carvings on the pillars in the Embekka Devalaya and the architecture of ancient Buddhist temples such as the Lankatilaka Vihara. Tilake's talent was recognized by his art teachers who exposed him to European art, specifically the work of the renaissance artists and the later romantics, impressionists and modernists. In school, he would spend much of his time sketching scenery and lifelike objects. Tilake joined the Survey Department as a draftsman while studying at Heywood College of Fine Arts in Colombo.

== Career ==
=== Early career ===
While enrolled in the Heywood College of Fine Arts (1951–1955) on scholarship, Tilake excelled and won several first prize awards after exhibiting his work in art galleries. In 1956, Tilake won the competition for the Buddha Jayanti Stamp (Commemorative stamp for the 2500th anniversary of Buddha's birth). He earned a postgraduate scholarship to the Academia Di Belle Arte di Brera in Milan, Italy, where he studied painting under professor Domenico Cantatore and Dino Lanaro, and sculpture with sculptor Mario Marini.

Upon graduating with distinction in 1961, Tilake exhibited at the annual art exhibition in Milan in 1962 before returning home to establish himself as a major player in the Sri Lankan art scene. Tilake would eventually return to Milan to establish his own Atelier in 1980.

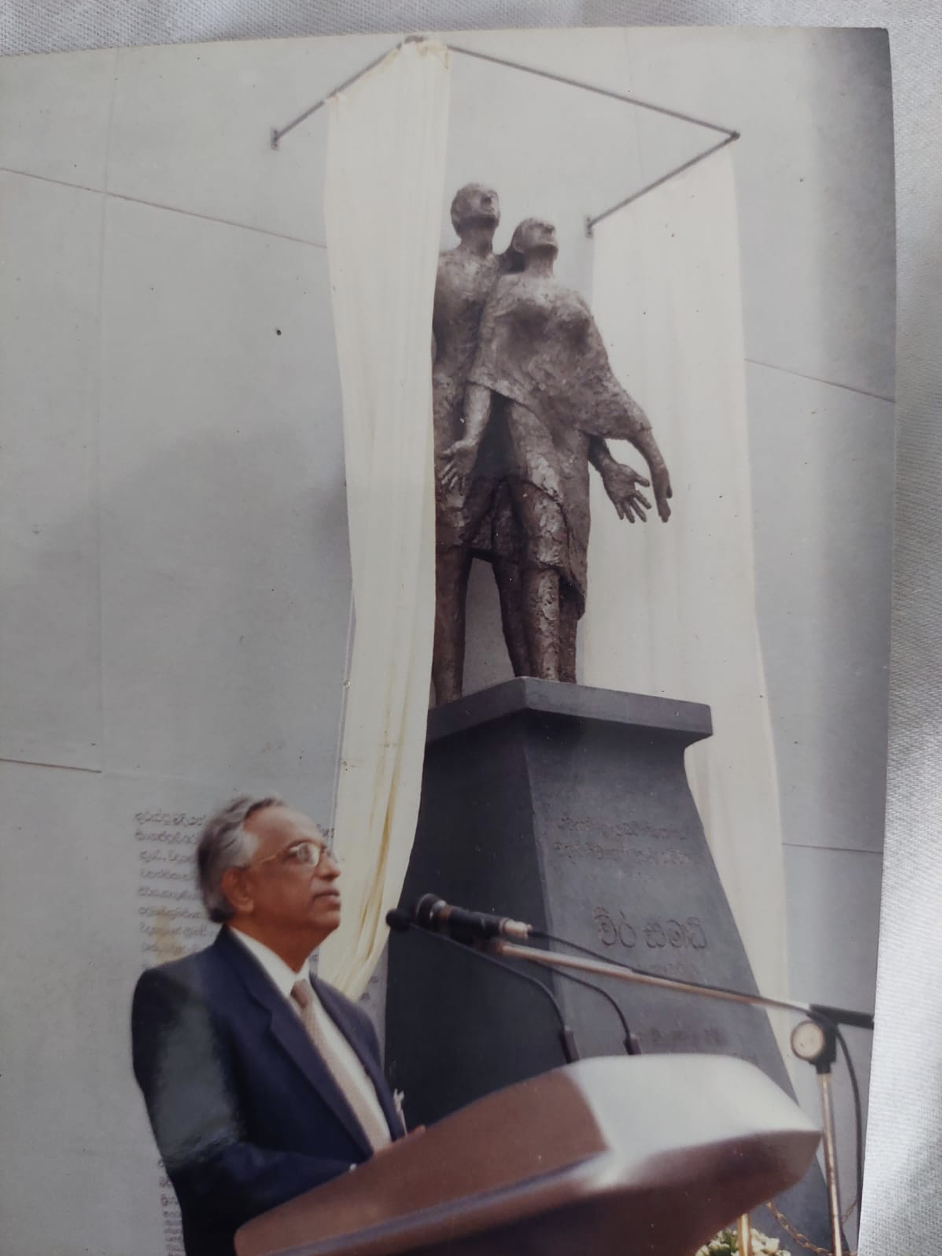
The inauguration of Tilake’s 20 foot sculpture at the Colombo Central Bank.

=== Solo career ===
Tilake led his first one-man art exhibition in 1967 in Sri Lanka, beginning a long career of 84 successful one-man art exhibitions. In addition to Sri Lanka, Italy, and Switzerland, Tilake's art pieces have been exhibited in Toronto, São Paulo, Montreal, New Delhi, Dhaka, Fukuoka, Osaka, Karachi, Barcelona, Paris, Beijing, Copenhagen, Bonn, Hamburg and London. In Sri Lanka, Tilake exhibited his work most frequently at Mount Lavinia Hotel, Galle Face Hotel, the Closenberg Hotel, Hotel Oberoi, and the Lionel Wendt Art Centre. Tilake's exhibitions have been opened by Dr. P. R. Anthonis, professor Chandra Wickramasinghe, Maestro W. D. Amaradeva, professor Cyril Ponamperuma, education minister I. M. R. A. Iriyagolle, Italian ambassador Franco Micieli de Biase, Edwin Ariyadasa, A. S. Jayawardena and writer Martin Wickramasinghe. Tilake owned art studios in both Milan and Zurich. In recognition of his contribution to the realm of fine arts, the government of Sri Lanka established Tilake Abeysinghe Foundation in 2001 through a special enactment in parliament. Tilake was offered by Mount Lavinia Hotel Chairman Sanath Ukwatte a permanent gallery to exhibit his art at the hotel in Colombo, being the first time that a Sri Lankan artist had been offered so by any institution. The hotel gallery devoted a portion of the lower lobby to the display of his paintings and sculptures.

Tilake's last six art exhibitions were held exclusively in Canada beginning in Labrador City, Newfoundland in 2005. Organized by Labrador Art and Culture Center, the event received national coverage by the Canadian Broadcasting Corporation (CBC) where Tilake was presented with a gold medal by the mayor of Labrador city in appreciation. Tilake later held five one-man exhibitions in Toronto, Ontario from which all proceeds of art sales were donated to Toronto Maha Vihara Buddhist Temple, Brampton Buddhist Temple and various fundraising efforts for Sri Lanka.

== Personal life ==
Tilake was married to his wife Padma until her death in 2019. In 2003, Tilake suffered a right-sided paralytic stroke. Determined to continue his passion for art, Tilake taught himself to write, paint, and sculpt with his left hand.

Tilake lived with his daughter in Toronto until he died on September 24, 2022.

== Awards ==
- 1956 – First Prize Buddha Jayanti Stamp
- 1962 – President's Prize, Ceylon Society of Arts
- 1984 – Cavaliere of the Order of Merit, Government of Italy
- 1984 – Gold Award for Most Outstanding Personality for Aesthetic Art, Lions International
- 1988 – Kalapathi Award, Ceylon Society of Arts
- 1993 – Gold Award, Japan Sri Lanka Exhibition
- 1993 – Vishwa Prasadini Award
- 1993 – Ruhunu Puthra Award
