= Jagath Weerasinghe =

- ජගත් වීරසිංහ
- Born: 1954; 72 years ago Moratuwa, Sri Lanka

Jagath Weerasinghe (Sinhala: ජගත් වීරසිංහ; born 1954) is a Sri Lankan contemporary artist and archeologist.

Weerasinghe has been a significant driving force in the development of Sri Lankan art since the early 1990s. He is Director of the Postgraduate Institute of Archaeology at the University of Kelaniya.

He obtained a Bachelor of Fine Arts with Honours in Painting at the Institute of Aesthetic Studies, University of Kelaniya, Sri Lanka in 1981. In 1985 he received a Conservation of Wall Paintings, International Centre for the Study of the Preservation and Restoration of Cultural Property (ICCROM) in Rome, which was followed in 1988 by a Conservation of Rock Art from the Getty Conservation Institute in Los Angeles.

In 1991 Weerasinghe obtained a Master of Fine Arts in Painting at the American University, Washington, D.C.

Weerasinghe coined the phrase '90s Art Trend', recognising at the time the need for a cohesive framework to describe the activity of his peer group. This adopting of a phrase as framework by Weerasinghe acted as a catalyst for theoretical inquiry into the politically conscious contemporary art praxis of the 1990s in Sri Lanka.

He was commissioned by the Sri Lankan government to design the monument 'Shrine for the Innocent' as a remembrance for the innocent victims of the violence that the southern part of the country experienced in the late 1980s and early 1990s with the work completed in 1999.

He co-founded the Theertha International Artists Collective in 2000, and served as its Chairman till 2017. Theertha continues to foster new artists and initiatives. He describes current Sri Lankan artists as living in an era of ‘para-modernism’.

== Exhibitions ==
Weerasinghe's works have been exhibited in the United States, United Kingdom, Australia, India, Netherlands, Germany and Japan. Solo exhibitions include Belief: The Promise of Absence, Saskia Fernando Gallery, Colombo, Sri Lanka, 2018; Dream for Me, curated by Liz Fernando at Khoj, Delhi, India, 2018; and Decorated, Breese Little, London, UK, 2014; among others.
