= Chandrasiri Palliyaguru =

Sri Lankan academic and writer (1943–2024)

- Born: 5 April 1943; Matara, Southern Province, Sri Lanka
- Died: 21 March 2024 (aged 80)
- Education: University of Kelaniya
- Occupations: academic, writer, critic
- Writing career
- Notable awards: Sahitya Ratna lifetime award

Chandrasiri Palliyaguru was a Sri Lankan academic, researcher, administrator, ethnographer, writer and critic. He is author of 54 books which include short stories, translations, historical novels, poetry anthologies, critical works, reviews, children's books and research works. He has written on linguistics, folklore, humanities, sociology, cultural studies, film studies, television and radio studies and theatre studies. He received the National Award for his works Samaja Muhunuwara in 1984 and Yatharthaya Saha Nirmana in 1994. In 2022, the Sri Lankan government awarded him the Sahithyarathna lifetime award for his overall contributions towards the Sinhala literature.

== Biography ==
Chandrasiri Palliyaguru was born on 5 April 1943 in Matara, Southern Province, Sri Lanka.

Palliyaguru joined Vidyalankara University in 1961, with a desire to study Hindi. He studied Hindi, Pali and Sinhala for his first year exams and wanted to do an honours degree in Hindi, but that did not happen as there was no Hindi honours degree course at that time. But he did not back down and chose Sinhala as his major subject and Hindi as his subsidiary subject, and graduated from there in 1965.

Bhadanta Anand Kausalya, who was the Hindi Professor and Head of the Hindi Department at the University, was one of the people who influenced Palliyaguru. He gained knowledge not only about Hindi literature but also about Indian culture from him. He also gained literary and academic knowledge about the epic poem Padmavati from him.

His Hindi education, which thus began, grew into the writing of a book in Sinhala titled Hindi Bhashaava Ha Sahityaya (1968). While still studying at the university, he went on a tour of India with Bhadanta Anand Kausalyaya without even informing his parents.

From 1965 to 1967, Palliyaguru served as a visiting lecturer in the Hindi Department of Vidyalankara University and Ayurvedic Medical College. He began his academic career in 1967 when he was appointed as a permanent lecturer in the Sinhala Studies Department of Vidyalaya University. He learnt Urdu from an Urdu language professor who came from Pakistan in the 1980s.

Palliyaguru had said that it was the Ananda Kosalyayana and the Udakendawala Sharankara who inspired him to write articles for various magazines since the 1960s. He also says that the inspiration he got after reading the book Bhaago Naagi, Duniya Ko Badlo (Don't divide the world, don't run away) by Maha Pandit Rahul Sankritya, who was a professor of philosophy at Vidyalayankara University, inspired him to take up many new subjects.

Palliyaguru studied cultural anthropology at Lancaster University in the UK. In 1976 he earned his PhD in cultural anthropology, for his thesis A Proposed Classification of Contemporary Sinhalese Rituals with Specific Reference to the Southern Province of Sri Lanka, from the Vidyalankara campus.

After graduating, he taught music at Sri Dharmaloka College, then worked as a music programme producer for the Sri Lanka Broadcasting Corporation and as a news anchor for the All Asia Hindi Service. In 1992, he returned to university service as a temporary Hindi lecturer in the Department of Modern Languages.

After his retirement he was residing at Kadawatha in the Western Province. Chandrasiri Palliyaguru died on March 21, 2024. Sri Lankan Minister of Transport, Highways and Media Dr. Bandula Gunawardena paid last respects during his funeral held at a private funeral home in Colombo.

== Career ==
As an academic, Chandrasiri Palliyaguru focused mainly on modern Sinhala literature, Sri Lankan culture and folklore.

Palliyaguru worked first as the lecturer and later as the senior professor and Head of the Sinhala Department at the University of Kelaniya. In 2013 he was awarded Professor Emeritus title by the university. Hea also held several other positions in the university including the Dean of the Department of Mass Communication Studies, Dean of the Faculty of Humanities, visiting lecturer in Hindi, and the Acting Head of the Hindi Studies Department. He worked to include courses on the sociology of literature and folklore in the university curriculum.

In addition, Palliyaguru served on several judging panels, including the Drama Survey Board of Sri Lanka. He also served as the vice-president of the Cumaratunga Munidasa Foundation. He is also a film critic.

== Contributions ==
Chandrasiri Palliyaguru is author of 54 books which include short stories, translations, novels, poetry anthologies, critical works, reviews, children's books and research works. Known for his extensive research in mass communication, Palliyaguru has authored several scholarly works on various aspects of the field. He has written on linguistics, folklore, humanities, sociology, cultural studies, film studies, television and radio studies, theatre studies, translations, travelogues, novels, film songs, and has also worked as a film assistant director and still cameraman (with Dharmasena Pathiraja).

His textbook Sahithya Samajaj Vidyava is on sociology of literature, and his book Ceremonies, Festivals and Rituals of the Sinhalese is on the customs, festivals and rituals of the Sinhalese people. His book in Sinhala titled Hindi Bhashaava Ha Sahityaya is on Hindi language and literature. The book 'Cinema Theory and Criticism', translated in 1995, has become an important reference work in the field of cinema.

As a novelist, Palliyaguru focused mainly on writing historical novels. He entered the field of historical novel writing with the book Epura Rajayu Aya (meaning: She who reigned in that city) based on the character of Queen Anula. After that he wrote the book Raja Virithin Surindu – Maha Vijayabahu Nirinda based on the character of Maha Vijayabahu, topa varadin kelesin kipem a novel about Sigiriya Kashyapa, Maha Kala based on the character of King Vattaha Gamini Abhaya, and the book Maha Biso Lilavati based on the character of Lilavati.

== Awards and honors ==
Chandrasiri Palliyaguru received the National Award for his work Samaja Muhunuwara (Meaning: Social Faces) in 1984 and Yatharthaya Saha Nirmana (Meaning: Reality and Creation) in 1994. In 2009, a 654-page tribute volume titled 'Samstuthi' was published in his honor. During the 65th State Literary Awards in 2022, the Sri Lankan government awarded him the Sahithyarathna lifetime award for his overall contributions towards the Sinhala literature.
