= University of the Visual and Performing Arts =

Art school in Colombo, Sri Lanka

University of the Visual & Performing Arts
- සෞන්දර්ය කලා විශ්වවිද්‍යාලය கட்புல, அரங்கேற்றக் கலைகள் பல்கலைக்கழகம்
- Former names: Institute of Aesthetic Studies of the University of Ceylon; College of Fine Arts; Heywood Institute of Art (Heywood College)
- Type: Public
- Established: 1893; 133 years ago School of Art, 2 July 1952; 74 years ago Government College of Fine Arts, 1974; 52 years ago Institute of Aesthetic Studies of the University of Ceylon, 1 July 2005; 21 years ago (Gained University Status) University of the Visual and Performing Arts
- Accreditation: University Grants Commission (Sri Lanka)
- Academic affiliations: University Grants Commission of Sri Lanka, Association of Commonwealth Universities
- Chancellor: Prof. Sunil Ariyaratne
- Vice-Chancellor: Professor Rohan Nethsinghe
- Students: 9,000
- Undergraduates: 8,500
- Postgraduates: 70
- Doctoral students: 50
- Location: Colombo, Sri Lanka
- Campus: Urban
- Language: Sinhala, Tamil and English
- Colours: Maroon, Orange
- Nickname: Heywood
- Sporting affiliations: Sri Lanka University Games
- Website: https://www.vpa.ac.lk/

University of the Visual and Performing Arts (UVPA) (Sinhala: සෞන්දර්ය හා කලා විශ්වවිද්‍යාලය; Tamil: கட்புல, அரங்கேற்றக் கலைகள் பல்கலைக்கழகம்) is a public university located primarily in Colombo, Sri Lanka, specialising in art, design, fashion and the performing arts. It was formerly known as the Government College of Fine Arts, Heywood Institute of Art and the Institute of Aesthetic Studies of the University of Ceylon. It has no known date of foundation, but there is evidence of teaching as far back as 1893. It is the only university in Sri Lanka to exclusively offer special degree programs in visual and performing arts.

== History ==
=== Colonial ===
The origin of the University of the Visual and Performing Arts can be traced back to 1893, the era in which the Ceylon Technical College was established. Drawing and Design were among the first courses to be taught there. Approximately five decades later, on 1 October 1949, the Department of Arts and Aesthetics shifted its locality from Horton Place to Heywood College. The restructuring of the university system in Sri Lanka affiliated the institute with the University of Kelaniya in 1980. A Special Gazette Notice formally announced the creation of the University of the Visual and Performing Arts on 1 July 2005. Sarath Amunugama was assigned as First Vice Chancellor.

The University of Visual and Performing Arts has a history spanning over 120 years. The origin of the University of the Visual and Performing Arts can be traced back to 1893, the era in which the Ceylon Technical College was established. Among the first courses to be taught at the college were Drawing and Painting. On 1 October 1949, the Department of Drawing and Painting moved from the Technical College at Maradana to the 'Heywood' building at Horton place and was subsequently renamed as the 'School of Art'. A diploma in Fine Arts was awarded to students upon the completion of five years of study. Prominent painter and teacher J.D.A. Perera was the first Principal of this institution.

On 2 July 1952, Music and Dance were included into the curriculum and the institute became named the 'Government College of Fine Arts'. On 1 October 1953, the Departments of Music and Dance were moved to 21, Albert Crescent in Colombo 7, while the Art and Sculpture courses continued to be conducted at the 'Heywood' Building. Three years after this, in 1956, this institution was once again renamed the 'National Institute of Arts' and it was taken under the purview of the Ministry of Education and converted into three schools, namely, the School of Art and sculpture, School of Music and School of Dancing and Ballet. All schools came under the administration of Dr Stanley Abeysinghe, Dr Lionel Edirisinghe and Dr S. Panibharatha respectively.

As a result of the first university Act of 1972, the institution became known as the Institute of Aesthetic studies and got affiliated with the University of Ceylon in 1974. The Institute had 03 Schools and an Academy, namely: The School of Art and Sculpture, the School of Music and School of Dancing and Ballet, and the Ramanathan Academy of Jaffna. In 1975, the Ramanathan Academy became affiliated with the University of Jaffna.

For the first time, in 1978, 63 students were awarded the Bachelor of Arts degree. Consequently, the restructuring of the University System in Sri Lanka brought about the affiliation of this Institute to the University of Kelaniya in 1980.

=== University status ===
The special Gazette notice issued by her Excellency the President of Sri Lanka formally announced the establishment of the University of Visual and Performing Arts with effect from 1 July 2005. This university was founded in order to promote and develop the Visual and Creative Arts as well as to offer recognized higher educational qualifications in these spheres of study. The President appointed Dr. Lester James Peiris and Professor Sarath Amunugama as the first Chancellor and Vice-Chancellor respectively. The university consists of three faculties, Dance and Drama, Music and Visual Arts and Jayasena Kottagoda, Sanath Nandasiri and Sarath Gunasiri Perera were elected as the first Deans of the faculties respectively.

=== 21st century ===
There are 24 departments functioning under these three faculties. The present Chancellor of the university is Emeritus Professor Sunil Ariyarathne, and the Vice Chancellor is Professor Rohan Nethsinghe.

== Governance and administration ==
The University of the Visual and Performing Arts is a state university and depends on the government for much of its annual grant, which is provided by the University Grants Commission (UGC). Due to this, its administration is heavily influenced by the UGC. Undergraduate education is completely free. The Governance of the university is under the provisions of the Universities Act No. 16 of 1978 and the Universities (Amendment) Act No. 7 of 1985 along with its own by-laws.

The university's administration is based upon that of the former University of Ceylon consisting of a dual structure of bodies: the council (formally known as the University Court which is the governing body) and the Academic Senate (academic affairs).

Much of the appointments to officers and faculty are carried out by these bodies, however on the recommendations of the UGC.

=== Officers of the university ===
Chancellor

The Chancellor is the head of the university and awards all degrees, although most duties are carried out by the Vice-Chancellor. The appointment is made by the President of Sri Lanka, to a distinguished person in academics, clergy or in civil society. The chancellor is Prof. Sanath Nandasiri.

Vice-Chancellor

Day-to-day management of the university is undertaken by the Vice-Chancellor, appointed by the President of Sri Lanka. The current Vice-Chancellor is Prof. Rohan Nethsinghe

=== Past Chancellors and Vice-Chancellors ===
Chancellors

1. Dr. Lester James Peiris
2. Pandith W. D. Amaradeva
3. Dr. Sanath Nandasiri

Vice-Chancellors

1. Prof.Sarath Amunugama
2. Prof. Jayasena Kottagoda
3. Prof. Ariyaratne Kaluarachchi
4. Snr. Prof. Sarath Chandrajeewa
5. Snr. Prof. Rohana P Mahaliyanaarachchi

== Notable people ==
=== Alumni ===
- Miyuru Somarathne
- Nuwandhika Senarathne
- Sujatha Attanayake
- Gunadasa Kapuge
- Titus Thotawatte
- Priya Suriyasena
- Tissa Ranasinghe
- Malani Bulathsinhala
- Mahagama Sekara
- Rohana Weerasinghe
- Tilake Abeysinghe

=== Faculty ===
University of the Visual and Performing Arts faculty includes scholars such as renowned Sri Lankan musicologist W. D. Amaradeva, Mahagama Sekara and Lionel Edirisinghe

== See also ==
- Education in Sri Lanka
- Sri Lankan Universities
