= Nilwala River =

- Location within Sri Lanka

Location
- Country: Sri Lanka

Physical characteristics
- Source: Sinharaja Forest Reserve
- Mouth
  - location: Matara
  - coordinates: 5°57′N 80°32′E
- Length: 72 km (45 mi)
- Basin size: 922 km^{2} (356 sq mi)

The Nilwala is a river in Southern Province in Sri Lanka. It originates in Sinharaja Forest Reserve and discharges into the sea at Matara. There is no consensus on how this river got its name. It is believed that the river got its name because, in the past, the river's water was very pure blue and flowed like a blue cloud. The Nilwala River was mentioned as Neelavahini and Neelawalanadi River in ancient sources. The most straight forward meaning is 'blue bearer,' 'Blue River.

The river is 72 km (45 mi) long and has a drainage basin of 922 km^{2} (356 sq mi).

== Tributaries ==
- Kotapola Oya
- Urubokke Oya (Diversion)
- Hulandawa Oya
- Siyambalagoda Oya
