= Star Fort, Matara =

Fort near southern coast of Sri Lanka

Star Fort
- Part of Matara
- Matara, Sri Lanka
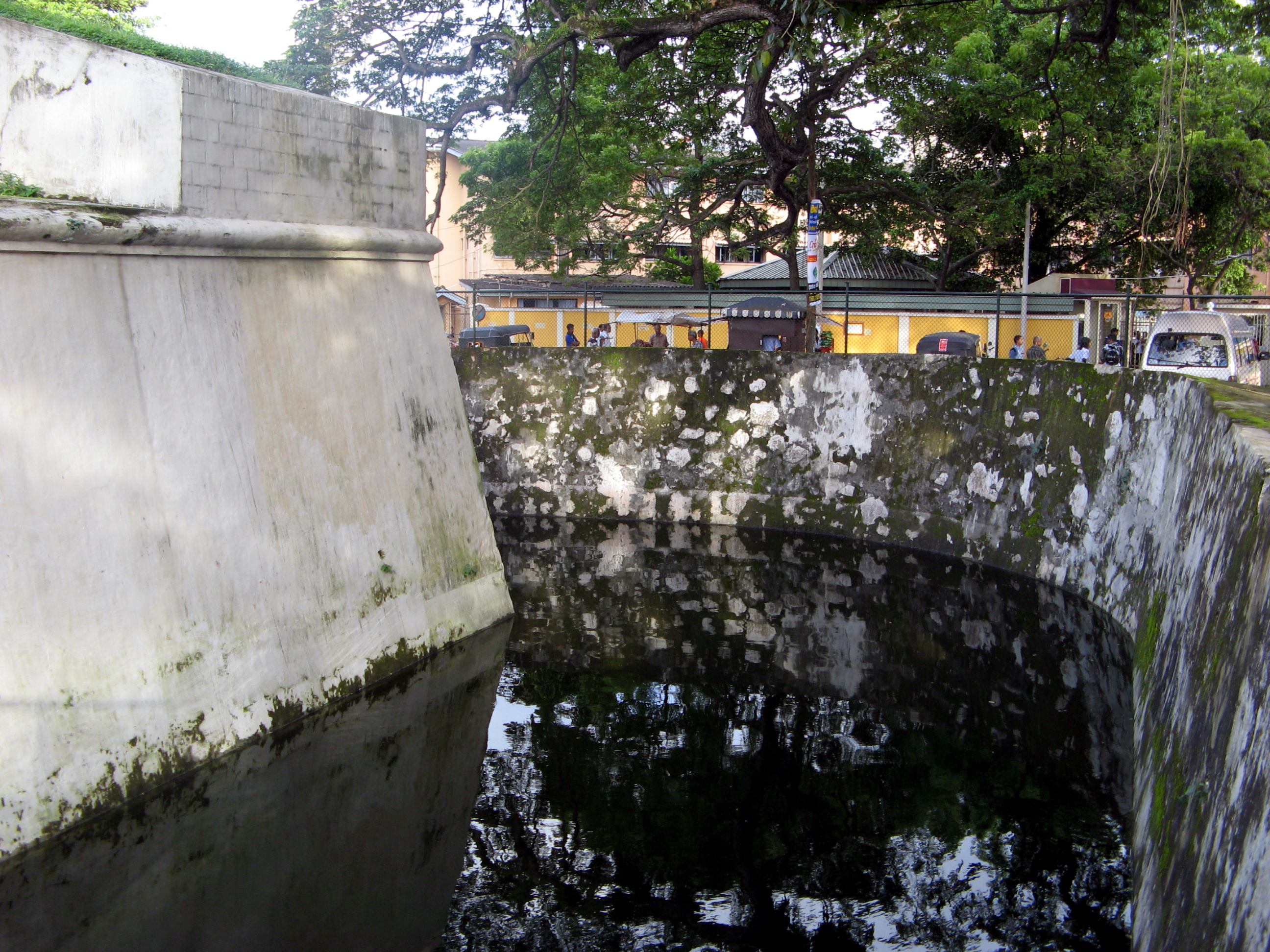
- The moat of the redoubt

Site information
- Type: Defence fort
- Controlled by: Government of Sri Lanka
- Open to the public: Yes
- Condition: Good

Location
- Sri Lanka
- Coordinates: 5°56′53″N 80°32′54″E

Site history
- Built: 1763-65
- Built by: Dutch
- Materials: Granite Stones and coral

The Star Fort (Sinhala: මාතර තාරකා කොටුව Mathara Tharaka Kotuwa; Tamil: விண்மீன் கோட்டை, romanized: Viṇmīṉ Kōṭṭai) is a fort in Matara, Sri Lanka, located on the eastern bank of the Nilwala River, approximately 350 metres (1,150 ft) from the gate to the Matara fort. It was constructed by the Dutch in 1765, and was originally called Redoute Van Eck.

== History ==
In 1640 the Dutch completed the main fort at Matara but found it to be vulnerable from attacks coming from land. In 1761, the Dutch were forced to flee as a result of the Matara Rebellion, in which Sinhalese forces backed by Kandyan Kingdom attacked and took control of the fort.

In 1763 the Dutch regained control of the fort and that year commenced construction of another smaller fort on the east bank of the Nilwala River, in order to protect the main fort from attacks originating from the river.

The Star Fort was built to a unique shape of a six pointed star with space for 12 large cannons to cover approaches from all directions. The glacis or outer wall is approximately 7.5 metres (25 ft) wide and is surrounded by a 6 metres (20 ft) wide and 3.1 metres (10 ft) deep moat. The rampart walls of the fort are constructed out of granite rock and coral, and are 14 feet (4.3 m) in width. The fort was built to hold a small garrison, food supplies and enough ammunition to withstand an attack before being re-inforced from the main fort. The fort also had a two prison cells and a 2.75 metres (9.0 ft) diameter well in its centre to supply water.

The drainage system was internal and disposed of the water collected from the monsoon rains to the moat. The date of construction (1765) is embossed over the main gate with the Dutch East India Company insignia and the coat of arms of the governor flanked by two rampart lions. The entrance gate of the Star Fort, which is faced with coral, is also emblazoned "Redoute Van Eck 1763", commemorating the Dutch Governor of Ceylon, Lubbert Jan baron van Eck (1719 - 1765). The roof of the building originally was roofed with cadjan leaves, which were later replaced with clay tiles.

The fort is said to be the last major defence post built by the Dutch but never had the chance to prove its effectiveness. In 1796 the fort was handed over to the British with the surrender of the Sri Lankan territory by the Dutch. The British used it as an administrative office and quarters by the District Engineer of the Public Works Department. In 1941, there was an attempt by the State Council of Ceylon to hand over the fort to the Department of Archaeology, which did not take place. In 1965 it was used by the Urban Council of Matara as a public library, until 1975 when it was acquired by the Department of Archeology. The Department of Archeology, carried out an extensive restoration between 1986 and 1988, in which much of the modern structures were removed and the original appearance restored. In 2012, with aid from the Dutch Government, the drawbridge was restored.

== Gallery ==
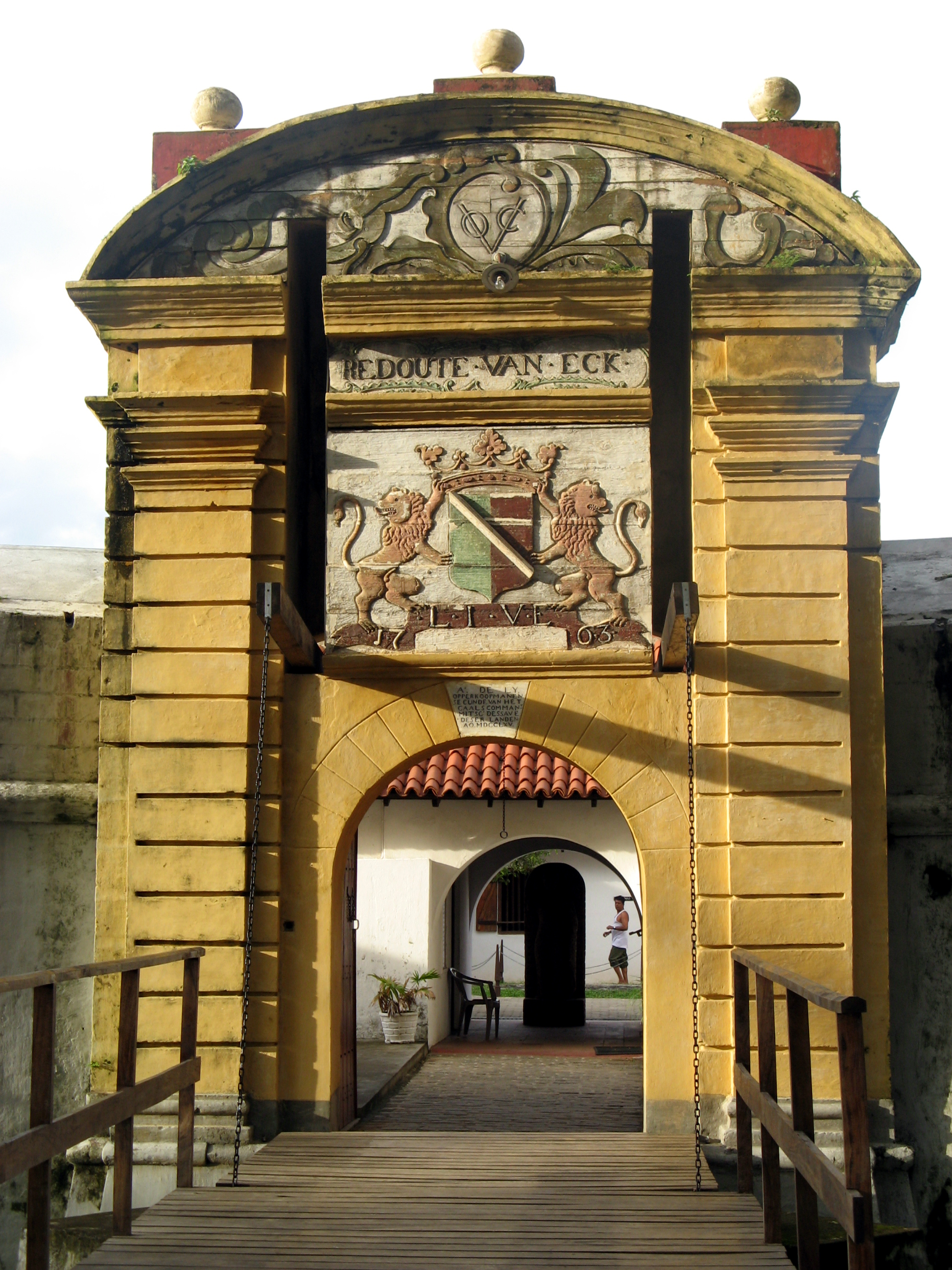
Entrance gate

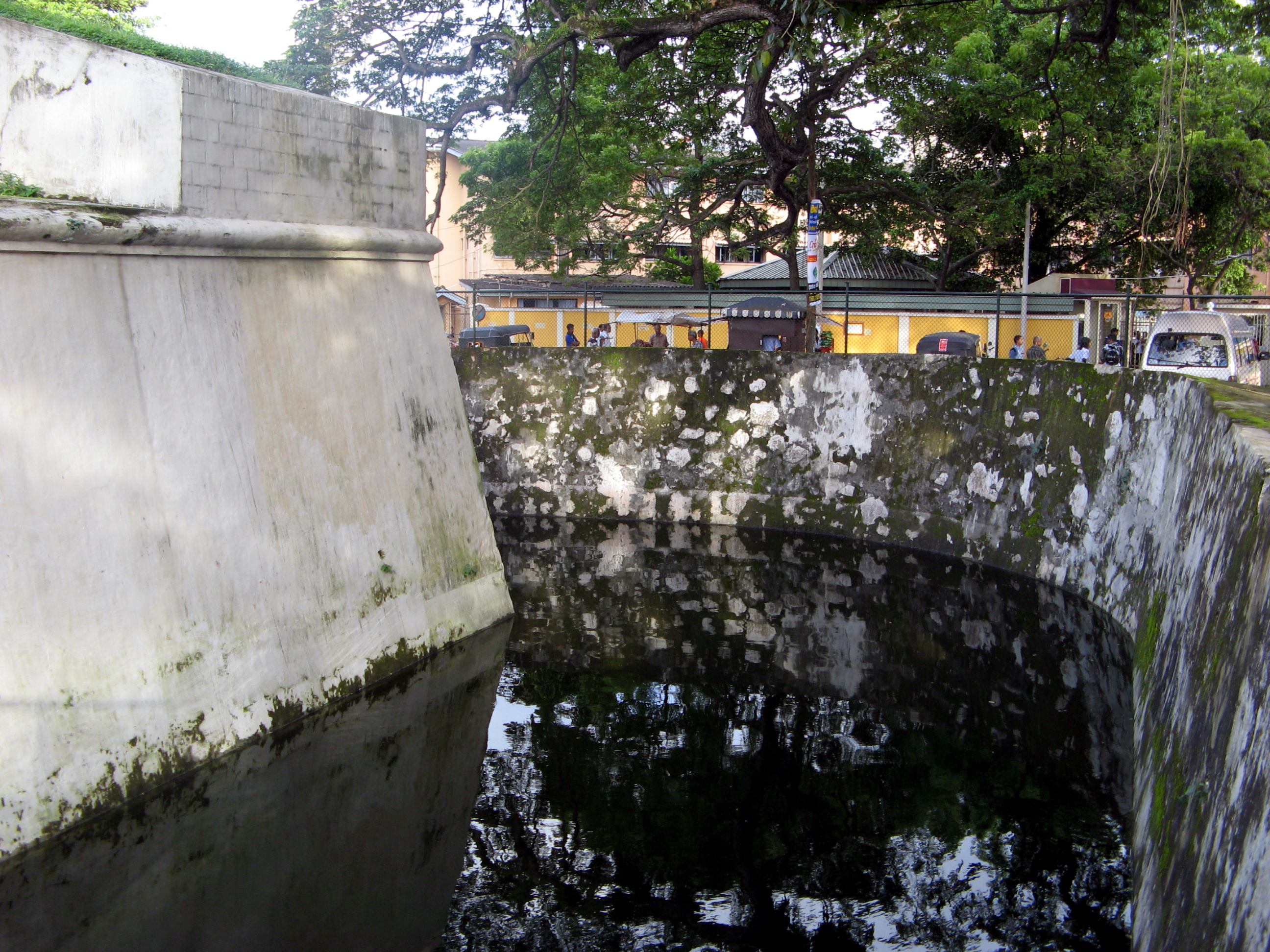
Moat

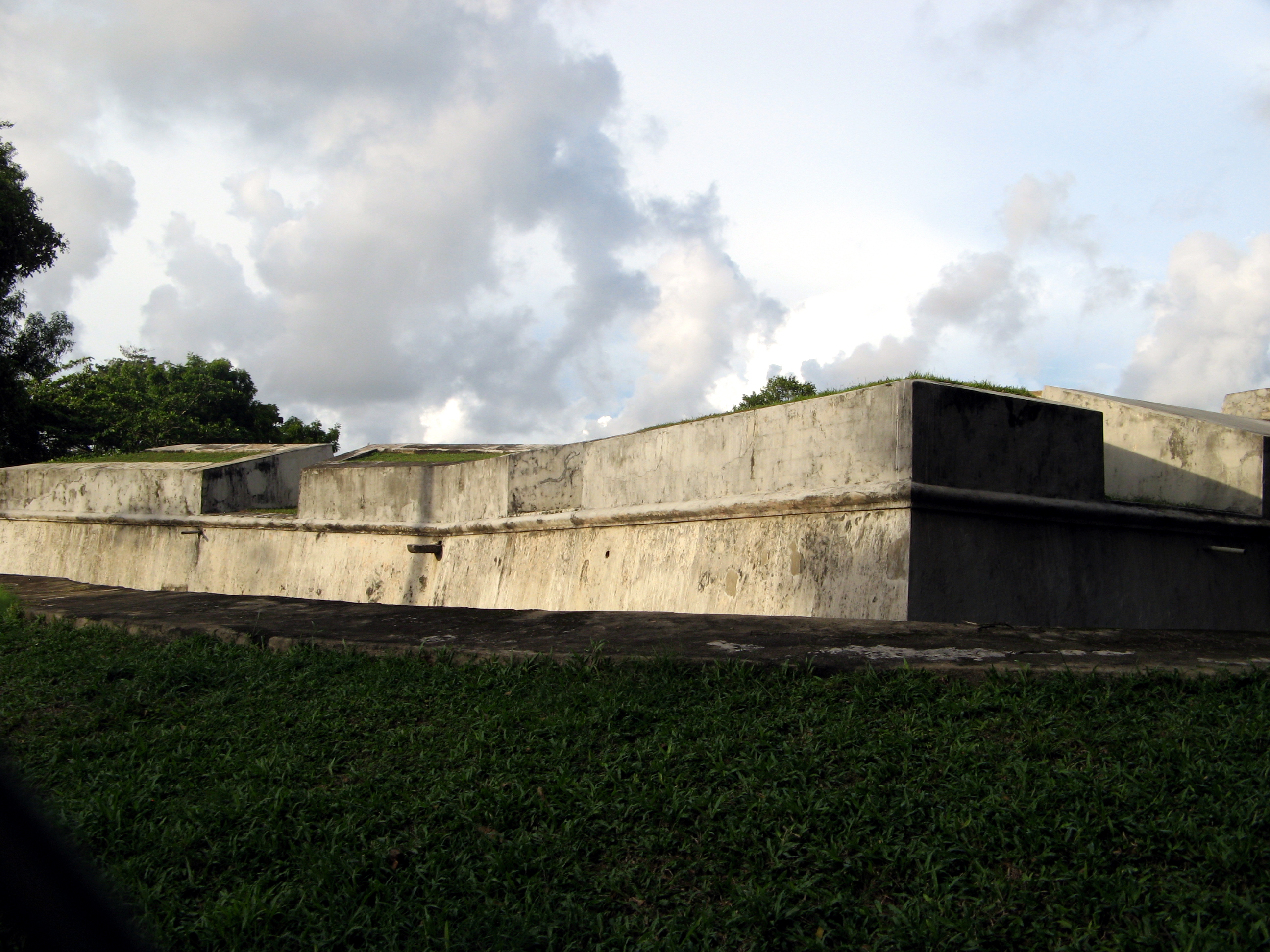
From across the moat

== See also ==
- Forts of Sri Lanka
- Matara, Sri Lanka
