= Tissa Ranasinghe =

Sri Lankan artist (1925–2019)

Tissa Ranasinghe (May 9, 1925 – November 2019) was a Sri Lankan artist known for his work in bronze. Born in 1925 the village of Yogiyana, he studied art at the College of Fine Arts, Colombo, in 1949, the year it was opened in the enthusiastic flowering of Ceylonese culture that followed the country's independence. After earning a diploma in 1952 he continued his studies at Britain's Chelsea School of Art and then the Royal College of Art, receiving a certificate in bronze casting.

He exhibited in a number of important shows, including "2,500 Years of Buddhist Art" at the French Institute, London, marking the worldwide anniversary of Buddhism in 1956. He also received a number of awards, including the first Unesco Fellowship allocated to Sri Lanka under the Creative Artists Scheme. Returning to his homeland, he served as a visiting lecturerat the College of Fine Arts, taught at the Institute of Practical Technology, Katubedda, and in 1970-71 was principal of what was by then the Government College of Art and Art Crafts, Colombo. Returning to Britain, he taught at the Royal College of Art and established a studio in southwest London, where he remained for the rest of his life.

One critic maintains that Ranasinghe "initiated a style of sculpture equivalent to Alberto Giacometti", with works that draw on ancient religion and mythology as well as down-to-earth modern realism. His works have been exhibited around the world, perhaps most strikingly in a solo exhibition, "Vision of the Buddha, Vision of the Gods", at the National Gallery of Thailand, Bangkok. His work is in public collections in Britain, Sweden, and of course Sri Lanka, where he has done statues of three prime ministers and at least one Governor-General.

He died in November 2019.
