= Sarath Amunugama =

Sri Lankan academic

- Education: University of Paris, University of Burgundy; Kingswood College, Kandy
- Known for: Founding Vice Chancellor of the University of the Visual & Performing Arts
- Scientific career
- Fields: French
- Workplaces: University of the Visual & Performing Arts, University of Kelaniya

Sarath Amunugama is a leading Sri Lankan academic, who is a professor of French and the founding Vice-Chancellor of the University of the Visual & Performing Arts, Colombo. He is a former Vice-Chancellor of the University of Kelaniya.

Amunugama received his secondary education at Kingswood College, Kandy and entered the University of Ceylon before attending University of Sorbonne III, Paris specializing in modern languages where he gained his Licentiate, Master's and PhD. He then gain a DESS from the University of Burgundy.

During his long teaching career he had held several distinguished positions such as dean, Faculty of Humanities, University of Kelaniya before benign appointed as the first Vice Chancellor of the newly established University of the Visual & Performing Arts on July 1, 2005. In 2008, he was appointed vice chancellor of the University of Kelaniya.

== Honors ==
SLUG2007, Prof Amunugama (left) at the Closing Ceremony of the Sri Lanka University Games.

- He was awarded the title Chevalier (knight) of the L'Ordre des Palmes académiques by the government of France.
- In 2006 he was made a Justice of Peace by the government of Sri Lanka.

== See also ==
- University of the Visual & Performing Arts
- University of Kelaniya
