= Matara Janadhipathi Vidyalaya =

Provincial school in Matara, Sri Lanka

Janadhipathi Vidyalaya Matara ජනාධිපති විද්‍යාලය මාතර

Location
- Wilfred Gunasekara Mawatha, Fort; Matara; Sri Lanka
- Coordinates: 5°56′43″N 80°32′41″E

Information
- Type: 1AB Provincial School
- Motto: Pali: අපදාන සොභිනි පඤ්ඤා ‍‍apadāna sōbhini paññā (A man with knowledge stands out)
- Established: 1914; 112 years ago
- Principal: U. Munasinghe
- Grades: 1–13
- Gender: Co-educational
- Age range: 6 to 19
- Enrollment: <2,500
- Colors: Maroon and gold
- Website: http://www.janadhipathividyalaya.lk/

Matara Janadhipathi Vidyalaya (මාතර ජනාධිපති විද්‍යාලය, President's College Matara; abbreviated JV) was established in August 1814 inside the Portuguese Fort at Matara as a missionary school, and currently falling under the purview of the Matara division educational zone. The school is located on the banks of the Nilwala river, and is divided into four sections: primary (grades 1–5), middle school (grades 6–9), upper middle school (grades 10 & 11) and upper school (grades 12 & 13). The medium of instruction is Sinhala.

== History ==
Janadhipathi Vidyalaya was established in 1814 August by the Rev George Erskine one of the pioneer Wesleyan Methodist missionaries to arrive in then Ceylon. The Maha Mudaliyar of Matara Don David Illangakoon, J. H. Granville, Esq. the collector and Reverend J. G. Erhardt, a German Missionary, connected with the London Missionary Society assisted the Rev Erskine to form the school in the premises of the Church and it functioned as a Methodist Missionary School in the Matara Fort. It was maintained by the Ceylon Wesleyan Methodist Mission, with only Christian children being admitted. The school began with three teachers and eighty students, with its main building being the church. The school was abandoned for after nine months due to the indisposition of the Rev Erskine but was revived again in 1817 with the appointment of the Rev Callaway

On 17 November 1960 the school was taken under state control, and the name of the school was changed to Matara Fort Kanishta Vidyalaya. Since this nationalisation, Buddhist children have also been admitted for studies.

From 1972 to 1995, during B. Jinadasa's administration period, the number of students and teachers grew. During this period, the school area was expanded by an acquisition of 26 perches of surrounding lands.

== Principals ==
Period	Name
1960–1963	Lionel De Silva
1963–1965	L. Jayawardane
1965–1968	H. A. W. Dissanayake
1968–1971	A. P. Josynona
1971–1972	P. K. Guruge
1972–1995	B. Jinadasa
1995–2014	D. Sudusinghe
2014–2016	K. W. Karunananda
2016–2018	M. B. Vineetha
2018-2021	C. Gunawardena
2021-2026	U. G. Munasinghe
