= University of Kelaniya =

Public university in Sri Lanka

Coordinates: 6.9729°N 79.9158°E

University of Kelaniya - Sri Lanka
- කැලණිය විශ්වවිද්‍යාලය களனி பல்கலைக்கழகம்
- University of Kelaniya Crest
- Motto: Pali: පඤ්ඤාය පරිසුජ්ඣති Pannaya Parisujjhati
- Motto in English: Self-purification is by insight
- Type: Public
- Established: 1875; 151 years ago Vidyalankara Pirivena; 1959; 67 years ago Vidyalankara University
- Accreditation: University Grants Commission (Sri Lanka)
- Affiliations: University Grants Commission (Sri Lanka), Association of Commonwealth Universities, International Association of Universities, Global Universities Partnership on Environment and Sustainability
- Chancellor: Narampanawe Ananda Thera
- Vice-Chancellor: Prof. Narada Fernando
- Administrative staff: 1000 full-time equivalent academic staff, 637 non-academic
- Location: No. 218, Kandy Road, Dalugama, Kelaniya, Sri Lanka
- Campus: Suburban
- Colours: Maroon & Yellow
- Website: www.kln.ac.lk

The University of Kelaniya (UoK; Sinhala: කැලණිය විශ්වවිද්‍යාලය, Tamil: களனி பல்கலைக்கழகம்) is a public university in Sri Lanka. Just outside the municipal limits of Colombo, in the city of Kelaniya, the university has two major institutions and seven faculties.

== History ==
The University of Kelaniya has its origin in the historic Vidyalankara Pirivena, founded in 1875 by Ratmalane Sri Dharmaloka Thera as a centre of learning for Buddhist monks.

With the establishment of modern universities in Sri Lanka in the 1940s and 1950s, the Vidyalankara Pirivena became the Vidyalankara University in 1959, later the Vidyalankara Campus of the University of Ceylon in 1972, and, ultimately, the University of Kelaniya in 1978.

The University of Kelaniya has pioneered a number of new developments in higher education. It was one of the first universities to begin teaching science in Sinhala and the first to restructure the traditional Arts Faculty into three faculties: Humanities, Social Sciences, and Commerce and Management.

It has several departments not generally found in the Sri Lankan University system and some Kelaniya innovations have been adopted subsequently by other universities. These include the Departments of Industrial Management and Microbiology in the Faculty of Science; Departments of Linguistics, Fine Arts, Modern Languages and Hindi in the Faculty of Humanities; and Mass Communication and Library and Information Sciences in the Faculty of Social Sciences.

== Symbols ==
=== Coat of arms ===
The coat of arms of the University of Kelaniya is circular and consists of three concentric bands, the outermost of which contains the name of the university in Sinhala and English. The motto of the institution, "Pannaya Parisujjhati" ("Self-purification is by insight"), is a quotation from the Alavaka-sutta of the Samyutta Nikaya, given in Sinhala characters in the same band. The middle band containing a creeper design encloses the innermost, which shows a full-blown lotus, signifying purity. These two designs are reminiscent of those occurring in the well-known moonstones at Anuradhapura.

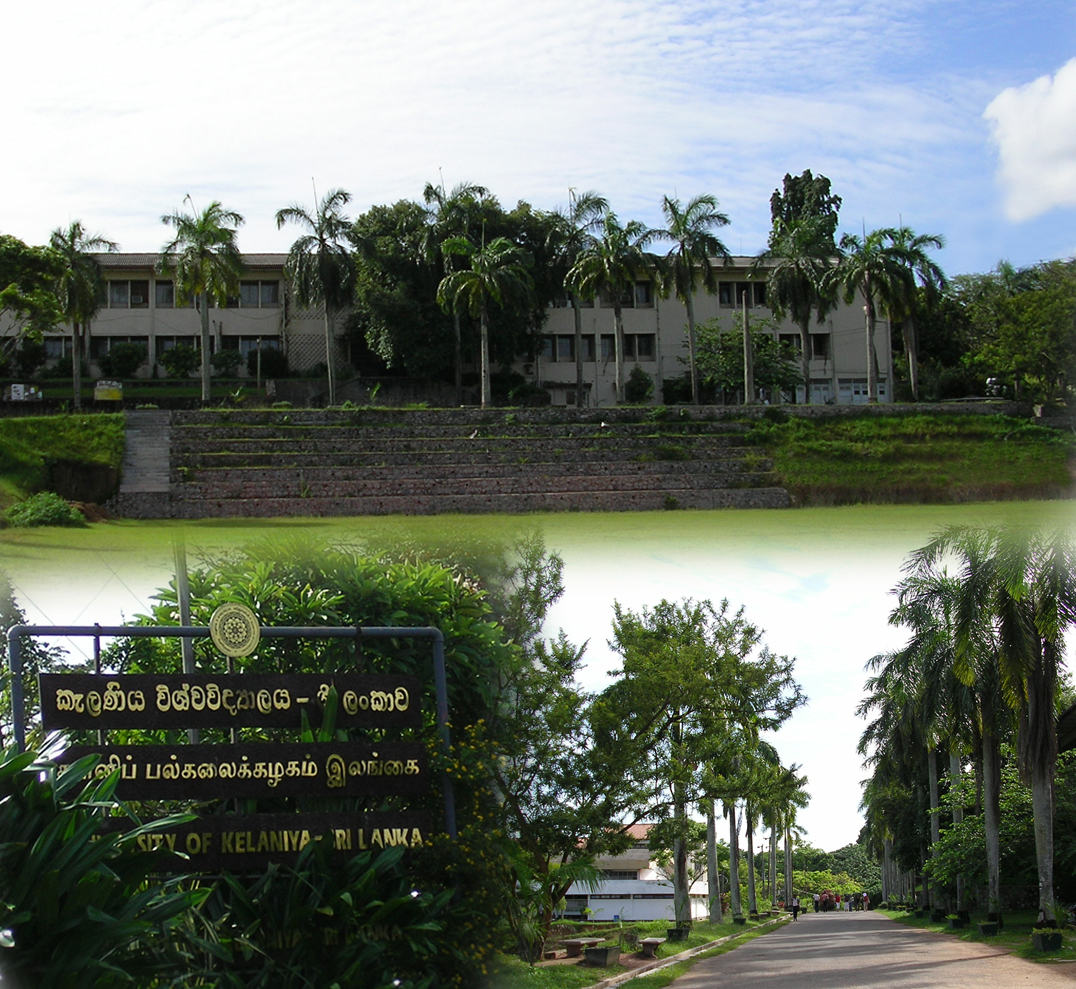
University of Kelaniya

== Faculties ==
=== Faculty of Science ===
The Faculty of Science started functioning in October 1967 with Charles Dahanayake as the dean of science. The intake of the first batch of students was 57. Formal approval for the faculty was given by the minister of education in 1968.

The science faculty was housed in the main building known as the "Science Block". Due to the continued increase in the student intake from year to year, a new lecture theatre complex and an auditorium were constructed in 1992, which enabled the intake of students to be increased to 450 in 2003. A new laboratory complex for the Chemistry Department and three buildings for the Departments for Industrial Management, Microbiology and Zoology have now been completed.

The science faculty was the first among the Sri Lankan universities to initiate the changeover from the traditional three subject (General) degree with end of year examinations to a more flexible course unit system, i.e., a modularized credit-based system in a two-semester academic year with the end of semester examinations. It offers a variety of course pathways designed to provide flexibility in the choice of subjects. Under this system students have the option of reading for a traditional three subject degree or for a degree consisting of two principal subjects and a selection of course units drawn from other subject areas. The BSc (Special) degree courses, begun in 1974, adopted the course unit system in 1986.

Currently, Prof. Sudath Kalingamudali is the dean of the faculty of Science.

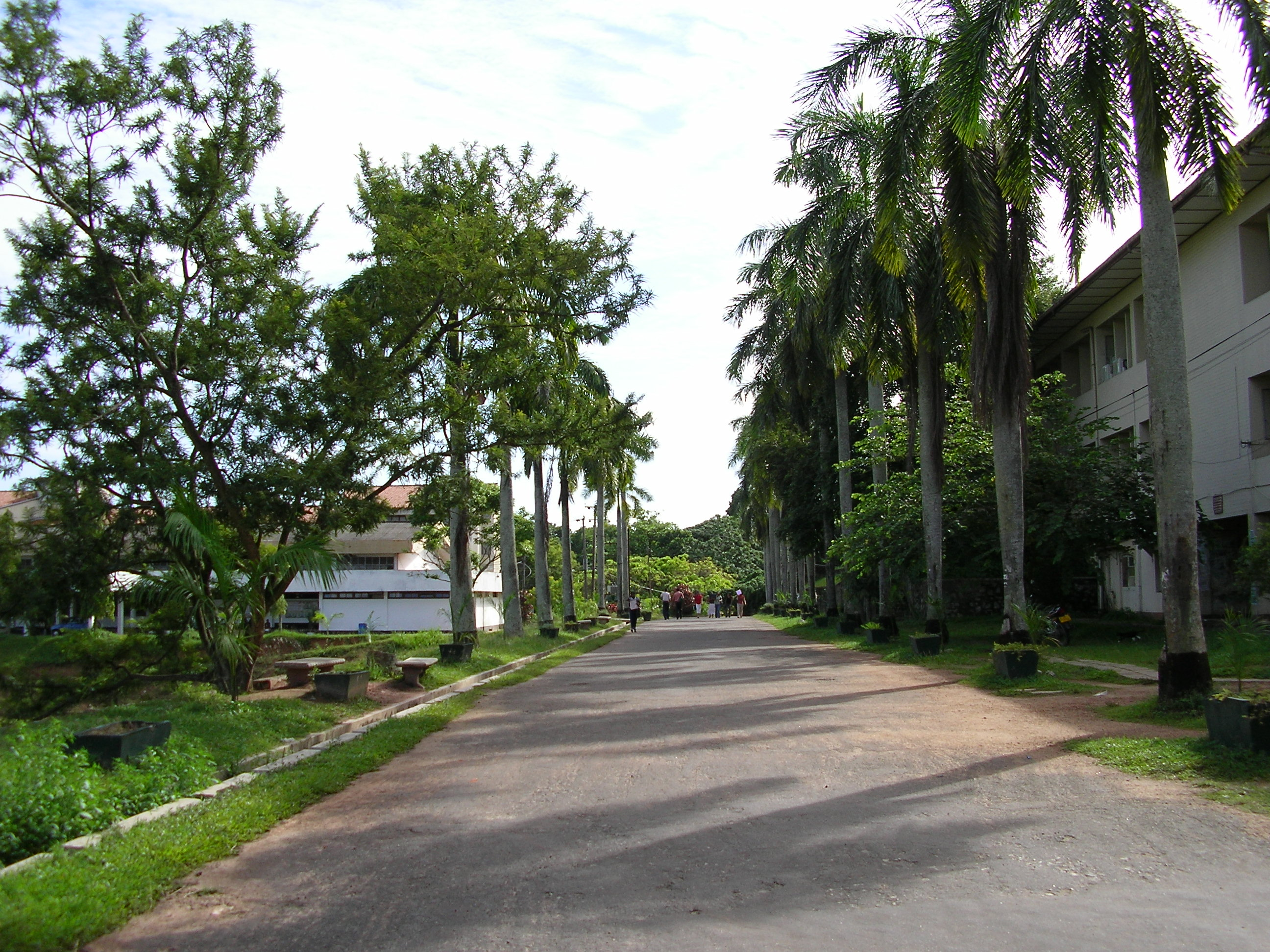
Faculty of Science

The faculty consists of eight departments.

- Department of Botany
- Department of Chemistry
- Department of Industrial Management
- Department of Mathematics
- Department of Microbiology
- Department of Physics and Electronics
- Department of Statistics & Computer Science
- Department of Zoology & Environmental Management

=== Faculty of Medicine ===
The Faculty of Medicine, University of Kelaniya is on a 35-acre (140,000 m^{2}) campus at Ragama. It is one of eight medical schools in Sri Lanka. The faculty began classes with the admission of 120 students in September 1991 after the government, in 1989, nationalised the North Colombo Medical College (NCMC), the first privately funded medical school in Sri Lanka established in 1980. The first batch of students, of the Faculty of Medicine, University of Kelaniya completed their five-year course and graduated MBBS in September 1996. Prof. Carlo Fonseka was the first dean of the faculty. Subsequent deans were Prof. Janaka de Silva, Prof. Rajitha Wickremasinghe, Prof. Nilanthi de Silva, Prof. Prasantha S. Wijesinghe and Prof. Janaki de S. Hewavisenthi. The current dean is Prof. Madawa N. Chandratilake.

The faculty now has over 1,000 medical students. This number includes international students, mainly from other South Asian countries, who have been admitted on a fee-levying basis. The faculty also welcomes students for elective appointments. Students from medical schools in Europe, USA and Australia have spent their elective periods with the university. In addition to the MBBS course, it conducts a BSc programme in speech and hearing sciences.

There is a permanent academic staff of over 120 and in addition 40 temporary academic staff and over 60 visiting staff that includes consultants who are based in the affiliated teaching hospitals.

=== Faculty of Social Science ===
The Faculty of Social Sciences, in student population, is the largest faculty in the University of Kelaniya.

=== Faculty of Humanities ===
The faculty includes disciplines associated with Buddhist and Asian cultures, such as Pali and Buddhist Studies, Sinhala, Tamil, Sanskrit, Hindi, Japanese, Chinese and Korean (only Sri Lankan university that has a 4-year Korean Language Degree) while teaching courses in modern European languages such as English, French, German and Russian.

=== Faculty of Commerce and Management ===
The Department of Commerce was the first to be established and contribute graduates to the industry. BCOM degree is unique to the Department of Commerce. Department provides special degree in Financial Management (BCOM (special) Degree in Financial management), Business technology(BCOM (special) Degree in Business Technology), Entrepreneurship (BCOM (special) Degree in Entrepreneurship) and Commerce (BCOM (special) Degree in Commerce).

=== Faculty of Computing and Technology ===
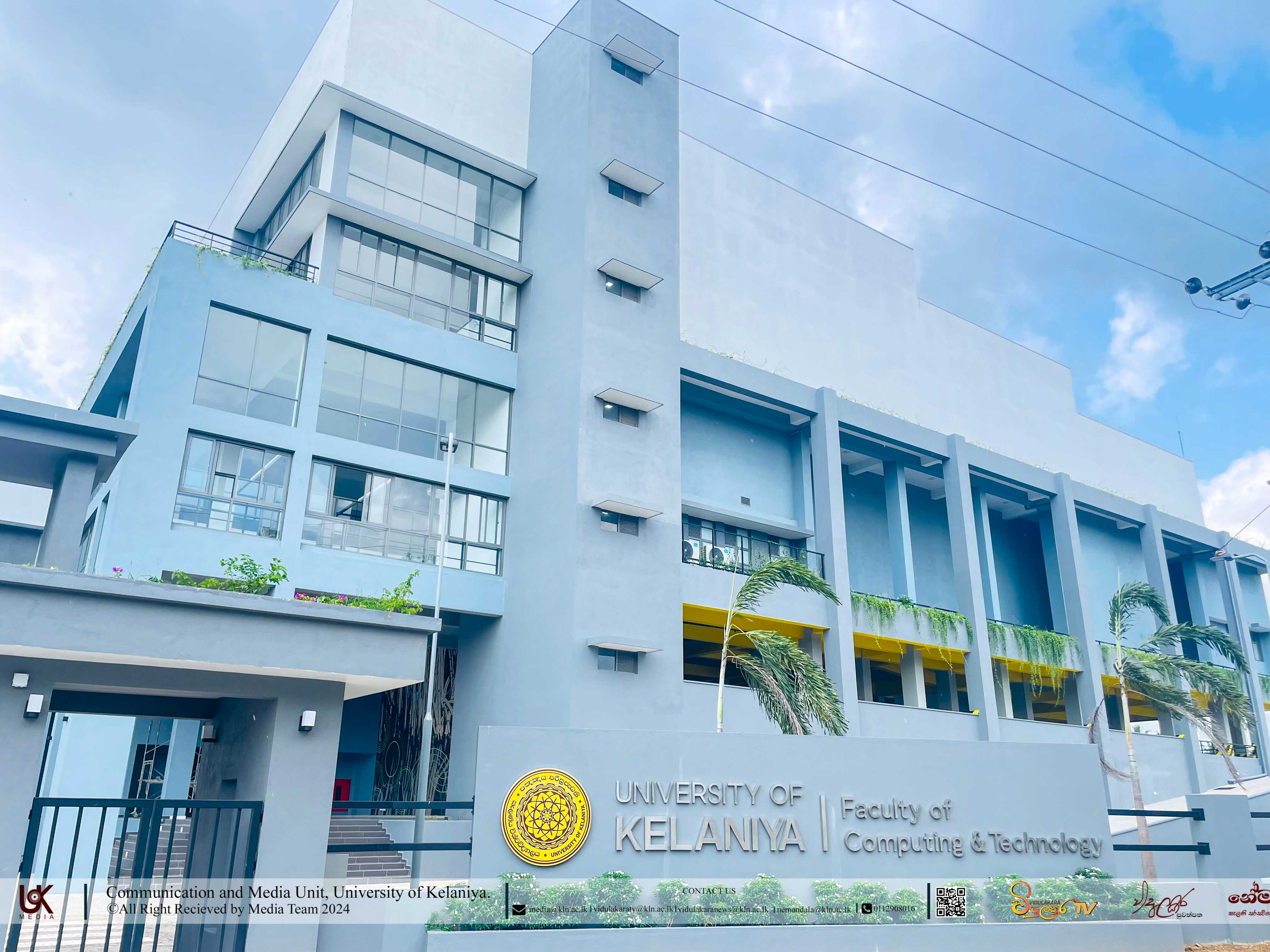
Faculty of Computing & Technology

The University of Kelaniya established its 7th Faculty - the Faculty of Computing and Technology (FCT) on 30 December 2015 and the Faculty commenced its operations on 18 January 2016.

The Faculty will offer Postgraduate Programmes in the areas of Computer Science, Software Engineering, Information Technology and Engineering Technology. The Master of Information Technology in Education programme is currently being developed for the Ministry of Education to train ICT teachers in the national education system.

The faculty will conduct research in diverse fields of significant impact. The research enterprise at the Faculty of Computing and Technology will expand from fundamental Computer Science research to the development of new technologies with applications to the industry and society as a whole. The Faculty is planning to propose the following Research and Development Centres:

- Centre for Nanotechnology
- Centre for eLearning
- Language Engineering Research Centre
- Centre for Geo-informatics
- Centre for Computational Mathematics
- Centre for Data Science
- Centre for Cyber Security and Digital Forensics

=== Faculty of Graduate Studies ===
Twenty-three postgraduate degree programmes and six postgraduate diploma programmes are coordinated by the Faculty of Graduates Studies.

== Libraries and ICT services ==
=== University Library ===
The University of Kelaniya Library, has a history spanning over 60 years. In parallel to Vidyalankara Pirivena became Vidyalankara University in 1959, the library was started with a collection of books belonging to Vidyalankara Pirivena. Subsequently, it was shifted to the current premises in 1977. Later, as this old building was insufficient to accommodate its growing collection and student population, the newly built four-storied building was added to the library system in 2013. Presently, the library owns a collection of over 245,000 books and monographs relevant to various study programmes and research activities in the university. Furthermore, the library has subscribed to EBSCO HOST, JSTOR, Emerald, Oxford University Press, Taylor and Francis databases with access facilities for more than 20,000 academic e-journals and more than 100,000 e-books.

=== Information and Communication Technology Centre ===
The ICT Centre provides support services in IT-related teaching, research, internet services, staff development and hardware maintenance for the entire university. It conducts a computer literacy course open to all students and advanced courses in Visual Basic, web designing and hardware technology for the students who have successfully completed the computer literacy course. On-the-job training in the IT arena is provided for the young people just out of the university who work in the ICT Centre.

The maintenance unit provides network, hardware and software support to the clients in the university, and IT for academic departments and administrative branches of the university. Video filming of special events of the university since 2005 is an additional service.

The ICT Centre hosts web and mail services for all students and staff. They have a university-wide wifi network called "Kelani-WiFi". The ICT Centre is the first institutional Sri Lankan member of Eduroam.

== Historically related institutions ==
The Vidyodaya University was created at the same time as the Vidyalankara University. Today Vidyodaya University is known as the University of Sri Jayewardenepura.

== Centre for Gender Studies(CGS) ==
Centre for Gender studies was founded by Prof. Maithree Wickremesinghe with the objective of initiating and conducting research on Gender issues and conducting educational programs on gender studies. Currently, Dr Sagarika Kannangara acts as the director of this centre.

== Faculty staff ==
=== Vice chancellors ===
- Thilak Rathnakara (1978–1982)
- S. L. Kekulawala
- M. P. Perera (1983–1985)
- I. Balasooriya (1985–1987)
- M. M. J. Marasinghe
- K. Dharmasena
- H. H. Costa (1994–1997)
- Senaka Bandaranaike (1997–1999)
- Thilakaratne Kapugamage (1999–2005)
- M. J. S. Wijeyaratne (2005–2008)
- Sarath Amunugama (2008–2012)
- Sunanda Madduma Bandara (2012–2017)
- Semasinghe Dissanayake (2017–2020)
- Nilanthi de Silva (2020 - To date)

== Notable Personnel ==
- Kemal Deen
- Harendra de Silva
- Carlo Fonseka
- Janaka de Silva
- Nalin de Silva
- Saman Gunatilake
- Jagdish Kashyap
- Ketumala
- Karunasena Kodituwakku
- Sunanda Mahendra
- Kollupitiye Mahinda Sangharakkhitha Thera
- Polwatte Buddhadatta Mahanayake Thera
- Chandrasiri Palliyaguru
- Witiyala Seewalie Thera
- Jagath Weerasinghe
- Maithree Wickremesinghe
- Harischandra Wijayatunga
- Ashin Nandamalabhivamsa
- Ashin Dhammasāmi
- Anura Kumara Dissanayake
- Sevvandi Jayakody
- Osmund Bopearachchi
- Nilanthi de Silva

== Facilities ==
=== Hostel facilities for students ===
Hostel facilities are provided for selected numbers of students. Hostels are located inside and outside the university premises.

- Kiriwaththuduwe Sri Prangnasara Hostel for Clergy
- C.W.W. Kannangara Boys' Hostel
- Yakkaduwe Pannarama Boys' Hostel
- Bandaranayake Girls' Hostel
- Sangamitta Girls' Hostel
- Viharamahadevi Girls' Hostel
- Ediriweera Sarachchandra Girls' Hostel
- E.W. Adikarama Girls Hostel
- Gunapala Malalasekara Girls' Hostel
- Hemachandra Rai Girls' Hostel
- Soma Guna Mahal (External) Girls' Hostel
- Bulugaha Junction (External) Girls' Hostel

== See also ==
- List of split up universities
