= Matara, Sri Lanka =

City in Southern Province, Sri Lanka

Matara මාතර மாத்தறை
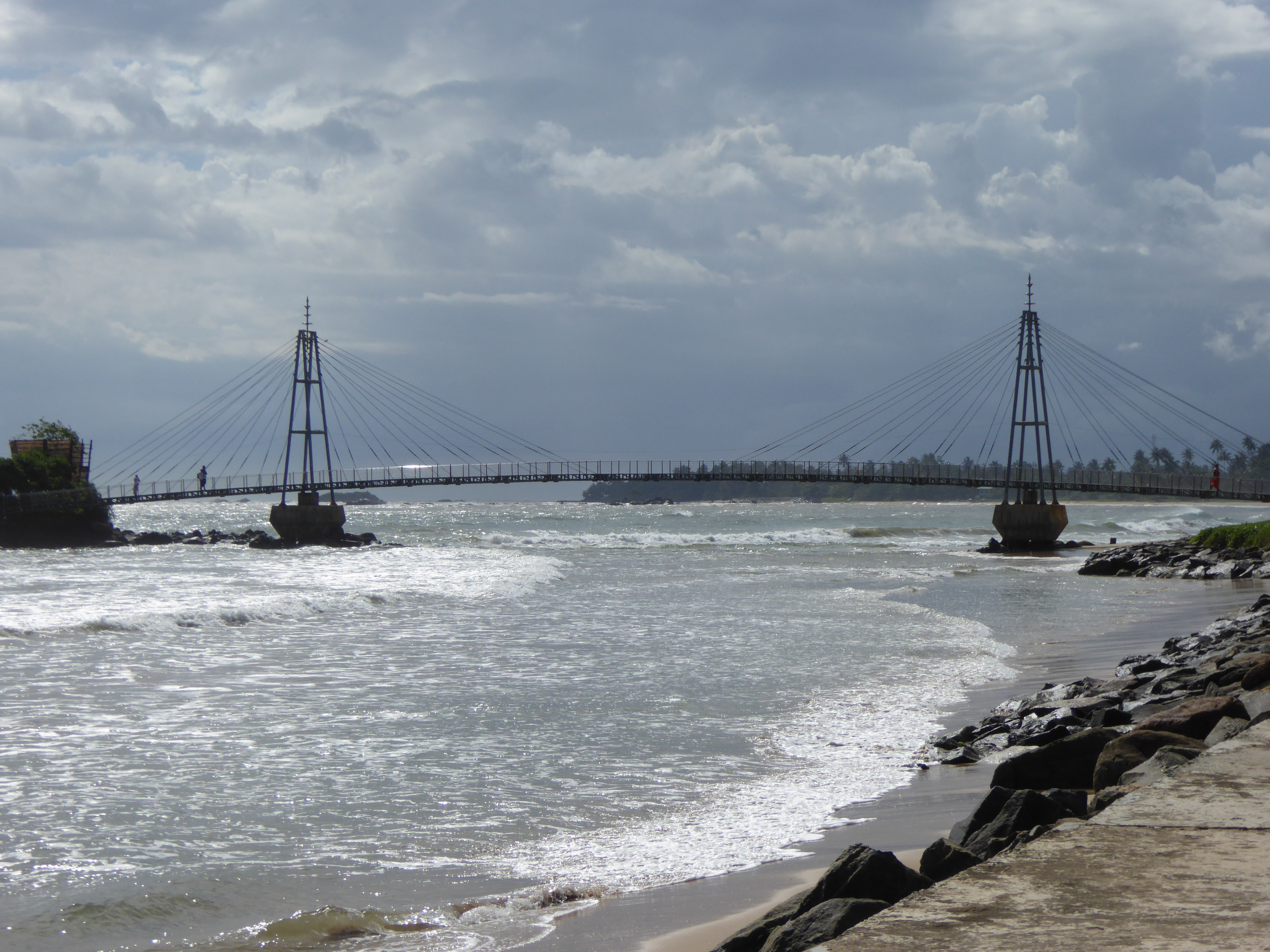
- Matara Foreshore

- Location within Sri Lanka
- Coordinates: 5°57′N 80°32′E
- Country: Sri Lanka
- Province: Southern
- District: Matara

Government
  - Type: Municipal Council
  - Mayor: Ranjith Yasarathna

Area
  - Urban: 13 km^{2} (5.0 sq mi)
- Elevation: 2 m (6.6 ft)

Population (2011)
  - City: 74,193
  - Density: 5,841/km^{2} (15,130/sq mi)
- Demonym: Matarites
- Time zone: [[UTC+5:30]] (Sri Lanka Standard Time Zone)
- Postal code: 81xxx
- Area code: 041

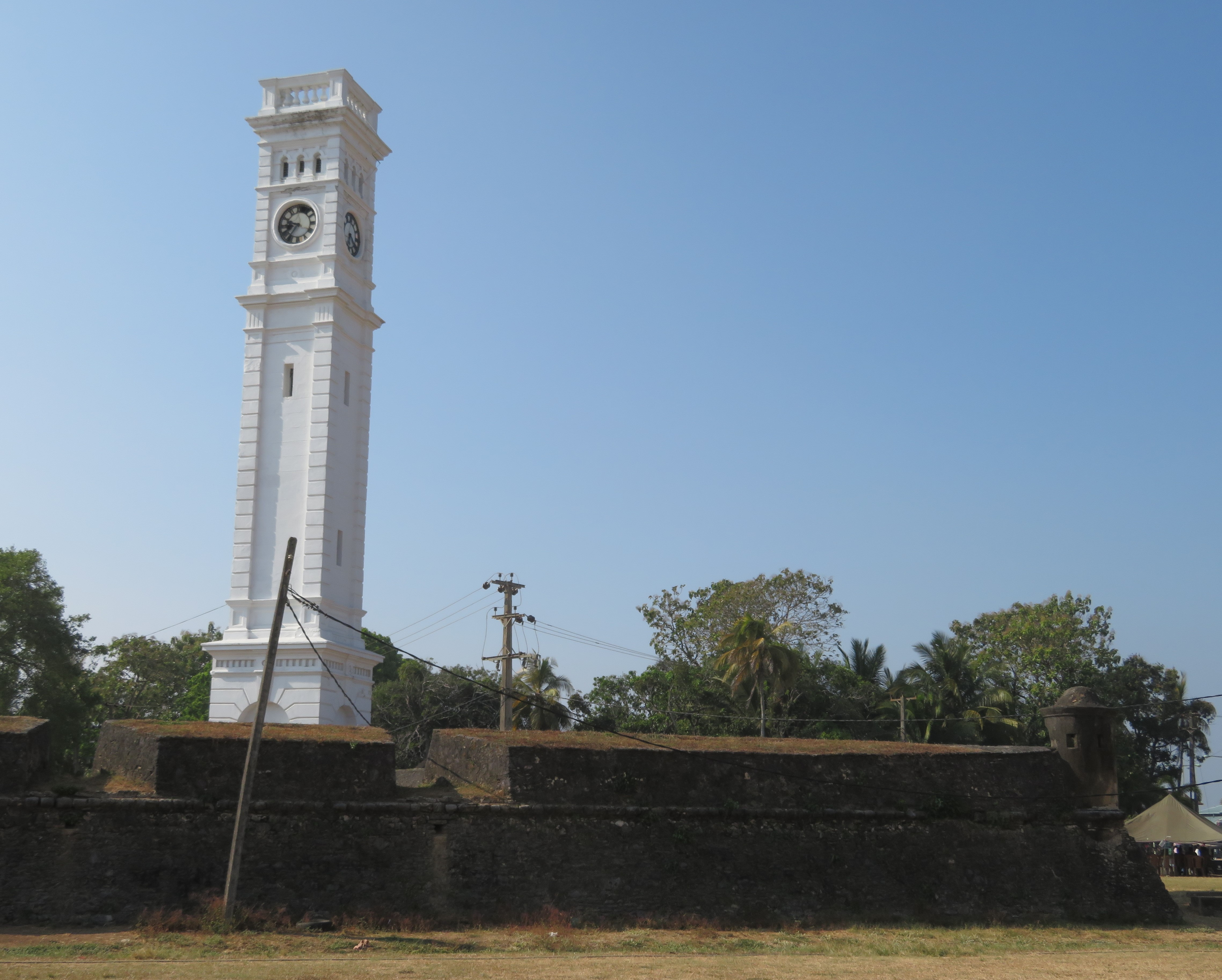
Matara Fort: Clocktower, merlons and bartizan

Matara (Sinhala: මාතර, romanized: Māthara; Tamil: மாத்தறை) is a major city in Sri Lanka, on the southern coast of Southern Province. It is the second largest city in Southern Province. It is 160 km (99 mi) from Colombo. It is a major commercial hub, the administrative capital and largest city of Matara District.

Ethnic composition in Matara DS Division according to 2012 census data is Sinhalese 111,039 (95.88%), Muslims 4,296 (3.71%), Tamils 326 (0.28%), Others 144 (0.12%).

Religion in Matara DS Division (2012)
1. Buddhist (95.3%)
2. Hindu (0.20%)
3. Muslim (3.80%)
4. Roman Catholic (0.40%)
5. Other Christian (0.30%)
6. Other (0.00%)

== Etymology ==
Consisting of two elements, the term Matara gives its meaning as the Great Ferry, that may be the meaning "great seaport" or "great fortress". It is also thought as being derived from the mispronunciation of the word 'Matora' by the Portuguese who called it 'Mature' or Maturai in 1672. The native word 'Matora' might also derived from 'Maha Tera' meaning the place where the Great River was crossed.

It was also called 'Maha Tota' (Malo Tota) or Maha-Pattana, the great ferry.Maha Ethara meaning "great ford". Today, the Nilwala River runs through Matara and it is said that there was a wide area where ferries used to cross. In 1673, the Dutch minister Philippus Baldaeus had called it 'Mature', in 1681, Robert Knox named it as 'Matura' and in 1744, Heydt called it 'Maderon'.

== History ==
Matara historically belongs to the area that was called the Kingdom of Ruhuna, which was one of the three kingdoms in Sri Lanka (Thun Sinhalaya තුන් සිංහලය). According to Thotagamuwe Sri Rahula Thera's Paravi Sndesaya, King Weerabamapanam made Matara his capital and named it "Mapatuna". Ancient kings also built the temple in the middle of the town, and now it is a very popular sacred place among the Buddhists in the area.

In the 16th and 18th centuries, Matara was ruled by the Portuguese and the Dutch respectively.

In 1756, the Dutch captured the Maritime Province and divided it into four administrative areas — Sabaragamuwa, Sath Korle, Sathara Korele and Matara. Out of these, Matara District covered the largest area (essentially the whole of the Southern Province up to the Kalu River). In the deed given by King Dharmapala to the Dutch, it mentioned that the area of Matara District extended from Kotte to the Walawe River.

In 1760, the fort was successfully attacked by forces from the Kingdom of Kandy. Matara maintained in the hands of the Sinhalese for almost one year. In 1762, the Dutch recaptured Matara Fort, without any significant resistance. Matara was the second most important fort, behind Galle fort, for the southern maritime provinces of the Dutch and a commanding base for some inland forts.

In 1796, the fort was ceremoniously handed over to the British. The Dutch and English culture and architecture can still be seen throughout the area. The lighthouse at Dondra Head was built by the Dutch, and it is considered one of the oldest lighthouses in Sri Lanka. The two fortresses, the Matara fort and the Star fort, that were built by the Dutch can be found in the city. Other important Colonial works are the St Mary's Church and the marketplace at Nupe Junction.

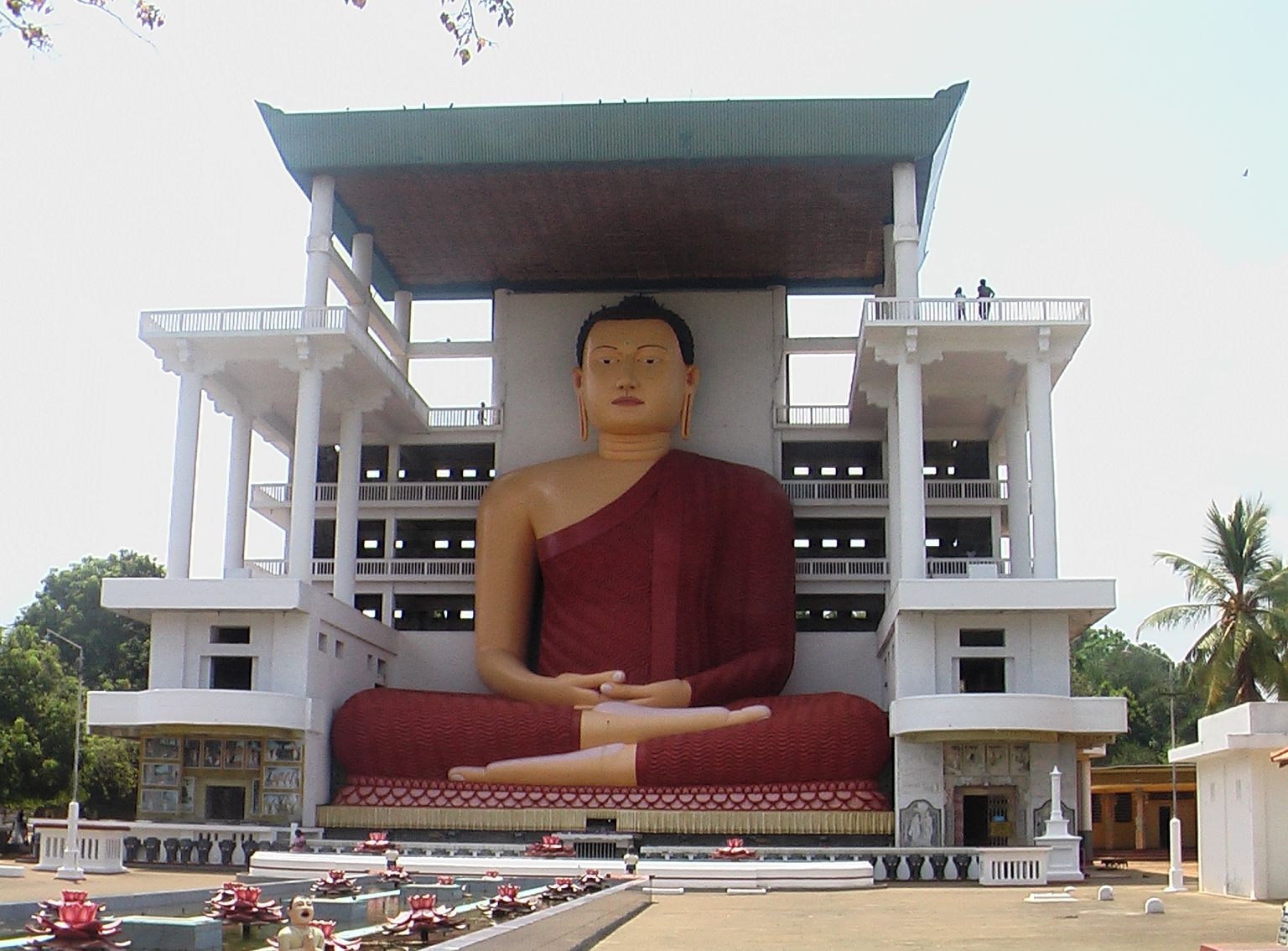
Weherahena temple

The most famous thinkers who lived in the area are Kumaratunga Munidasa and Gajaman Nona. The ethnic majority of Matara is Sinhalese; during the 16th and 17th centuries Moors arrived in the area as traders from Arabia. Today their descendants coexist with Sinhalese peacefully as an ethnic minority.

== Attractions ==
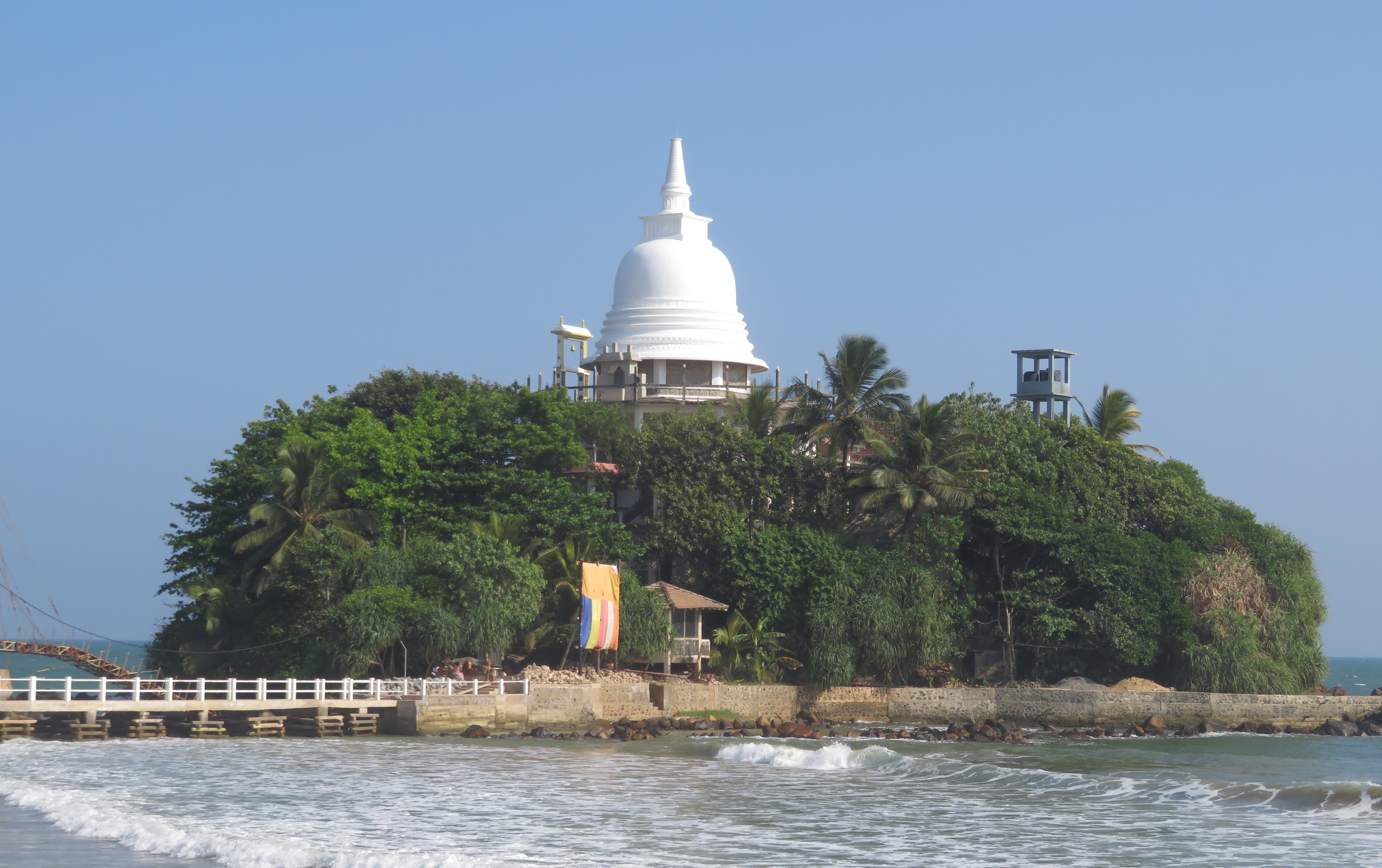
Parewi Dewa in Matara

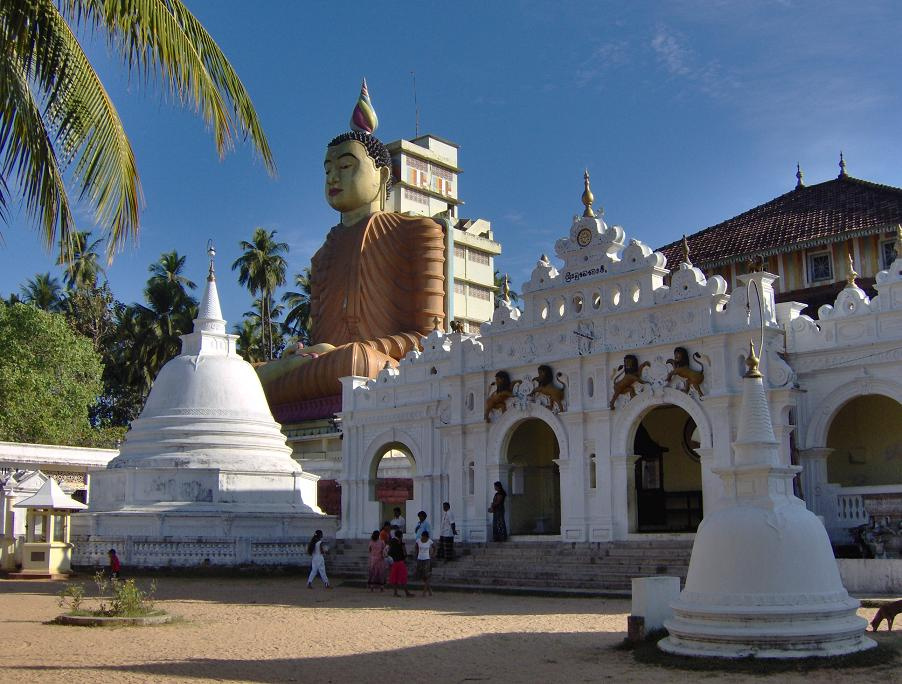
Wewurukannala Viharaya, Sri Lanka

Matara's main attractions include its ramparts, Dutch architecture, a well-preserved fort and its street life.

- Parewi Dewa (Rock in Water) or Parewi Dipa temple is a relatively modern Buddhist temple on Pigeon Island (a small offshore island) in front of the city. It is reached by an elegant cable-stayed footbridge, which was erected in 2008 (replacing an earlier bridge, which was washed away in the 2004 tsunami). The temple is set in attractive gardens and houses numerous statues of the Buddha and a replica of the alleged footprint found on Adam's Peak. Matara is a Buddhist stronghold in the island with a Buddhist population of 110,335 persons (95.28%) in Matara DS division according to 2012 census.
- Weragampita Rajamaha Viharaya Temple
- Matara Bodhiya, a Buddhist temple, which is the site of a sacred fig tree.
- Matara fort/ramparts: The Matara fort was built in 1560 by the Portuguese and was substantially rebuilt by the Dutch in 1640, following the capture of Galle. The fort, which consists of a large stone rampart, occupies the promontory, which separates the Niwala River lagoon and the ocean. The defense wall with merlons and a bartizan is well-preserved.
- Dutch Reformed Church, Matara was constructed within Matara fort by the Dutch in 1706. It was extensively remodelled in 1767, following the recapture of the fort in 1762.
- Star Fort is on the western or landward side of the Nawali River. The fort was constructed by the Dutch following the Matara rebellion in 1761, to protect the main fort from attacks originating from the river. Construction of the unique star-shaped fort was completed in 1765.
- Old Nupe Market was constructed in 1784 by the Dutch, about 3.2 kilometres (2.0 mi) from Matara fort.
- St Mary's Church is on Beach Road. The date on the doorway (1769) refers to the reconstruction following the 1762 Matara Rebellion. But Roman Catholic population in Matara DS division is only 469 persons(0.4%)according to 2012 census.

== Surroundings ==
- Weherehena Temple in the east of Matara which was built in 1909 and renovated in 1990 is famous for its wall paintings and its tall Buddha statue.
- Dikwella, 22 km (14 mi) east of Matara is noted for Sri Lanka's largest seated Buddha statue, which is 50 metres (160 ft) tall and can be visited in Wewurukannalla Viharaya Temple.

== Education ==
=== Universities ===
- Open University of Sri Lanka (regional centre)
- Sri Lanka Institute of Information Technology (regional centre)
- University College of Matara
- University of Ruhuna

=== Schools ===
- Matara Janadhipathi Vidyalaya, established in 1814
- Mahamaya Girls' School established in 1932
- Mahinda Rajapaksa School, established in 2013
- Matara Central College, established in 1932
- Rahula College, established in 1923
- St. Mary's Convent established in 1908
- St. Servatius College, established in 1897
- St. Thomas' College, established in 1844
- St. Thomas' Girls' High School established in 1898
- Shariputhara College, established in 1927
- Sujatha Vidyalaya, established in 1929
- Palatuwa Gunarathana Central College, established in 1926
- Anura College, established in 1955
- Buddhist College, established in 2006
- Elite International School, established in 2025
- Leeds International School, established in 2000

== Economy and infrastructure ==
=== Transport ===
==== Rail ====
The Matara railway station, was the terminus of Sri Lanka Railways' Coastal Line, until an extension to Beliatta was opened in April 2019.

==== Road ====
Matara is a major transport hub in the country. It is served by the A2 highway, which runs through the city. It is also the southern terminus of stage 2 of the Southern Expressway E01 expressway (Sri Lanka) since March 2014.

== Notable people ==
- Chandrasiri Palliyaguru, Sri Lankan academic and writer.
- Sanath Jayasuriya, Sri Lankan Cricketer

== See also ==
- Railway stations in Sri Lanka
