= 1908 Birthday Honours =

Birthday of Edward VII

The 1908 Birthday Honours for the British Empire were announced on 28 June, to celebrate the birthday of Edward VII.

The recipients of honours are displayed here as they were styled before their new honour, and arranged by honour, with classes (Knight, Knight Grand Cross, etc.) and then divisions (Military, Civil, etc.) as appropriate.

== The Most Honourable Order of the Bath ==
=== Knight Grand Cross of the Order of the Bath (GCB) ===
Military Division

- General Sir William Gustavus Nicholson, K.C.B., Chief of the General Staff (1st Military Member, Army Council.)
- General Sir John James Hood Gordon, K.C.B., Indian Army, Colonel 29th Punjabis.

Civil Division

- Francis, Lord Knollys, G.C.V.O., K.C.B., K.C.M.G., I.S.O., Private Secretary to The King.
- The Right Honourable Sir Francis Leveson Bertie, G.C.M.G., G.C.V.O., K.C.B., His Majesty's Ambassador Extraordinary and Plenipotentiary at Paris.
- Sir George Herbert Murray, K.C.B., Permanent Secretary, Treasury.
- Sir Arthur Godley, K.C.B., Under Secretary of State, India Office.

=== Knight Commander of the Order of the Bath (KCB) ===
Military Division

- Admiral Sir Reginald Neville Custance, K.C.M.G., C.V.O.
- Vice-Admiral Sir Edmund Samuel Poë, K.C.V.O.
- Vice-Admiral The Honourable Sir Hedworth Lambton, K.C.V.O., C.B.
- Vice-Admiral Sir Francis Bridgeman Bridgeman, K.C.V.O.
- Major-General Henry Augustus Bushman, C.B., Colonel 9th (Queen's Royal) Lancers.
- Lieutenant-General Henry Fane Grant, C.B., Governor and Commander-in-Chief, Malta.
- Major-General Harcourt Mortimer Bengough, C.B. (Retired).
- Major-General Thomas Graham, C.B., Royal (late Bengal) Artillery (Retired).
- Major-General John Munro Sym, C.B., Indian Army.
- Lieutenant-General Frederick Lance, C.B., Indian Army, Colonel 22nd Sam Browne's Cavalry (Frontier Force).
- Lieutenant-General William Henry Mackinnon, C.V.O., C.B., Director General of the Territorial Force.
- Major-General Herbert Scott Gould Miles, C.V.O., C.B., Quartermaster-General to the Forces (3rd Military Member, Army Council).
- Major-General and Honorary Lieutenant-General The Honourable Somerset John Gough Calthorpe, C.B., Colonel 5th (Princess Charlotte of Wales's) Dragoon Guards.

Civil Division

- Colonel (temporary Major-General) Charles Frederic Hadden, C.B., Master-General of the Ordnance (4th Military Member, Army Council.)
- Henry Hardinge Samuel Cunynghame, Esq., C.B.
- Robert Chalmers, Esq., C.B.
- Edward Stanley Hope, Esq., C.B.
- William Henry Power, Esq., C.B., F.R.S.
- Henry Babington Smith, Esq., C.B., C.S.I.
- Hubert Llewellyn Smith, Esq., C.B.

=== Companion of the Order of the Bath (CB) ===
Military Division

- Major-General Henry Bulckley Burlton Watkis, Indian Army, Brigade Commander, India.
- Major-General Frederick Augustus Bowles, Commander, Coast Defences, Plymouth.
- Colonel Henry Vivian Cowan, C.V.O., A.D.C., Commandant (General Staff Officer, 1st Grade), Royal Military Academy.
- Colonel (Brigadier-General) John Lindesay Keir, Brigade Commander, India.
- Colonel Robert Whyte Melville Jackson, C.M.G., Chief Ordnance Officer, Royal Army Clothing Factory.
- Colonel (Brigadier-General) Francis Henry Kelly, Brigade Commander, India.
- Colonel Charles Conyngham Ellis.
- Colonel (Brigadier-General) Francis Charles Carter, Brigadier-General Sub-District, South Africa.
- Colonel Edward Hegan.
- Colonel (Brigadier-General) Frederick Hammersley, Brigadier-General 3rd Brigade, Aldershot Command.
- Colonel Henry Richard Beadon Donne, Assistant Adjutant General, Headquarters of Army.
- Colonel (Brigadier-General) Charles Herbert Powell, Indian Army, Brigade Commander, India.
- Colonel (Brigadier-General) Francis Garnett Atkinson, Indian Army, Brigade Commander, India.
- Major and Brevet Colonel Augustus de Segur McKerrell, Cameron Highlanders.
- Colonel (Brigadier-General) William Edward Blewitt, C.M.G., Director of Artillery, Headquarters of Army.
- Colonel Francis Seymour Inglefield, D.S.O., General Staff Officer, 1st Grade, 5th Division, Irish Command.
- Colonel (Brigadier-General) Lovick Bransby Friend, Commander, Coast Defences, Scottish Command.
- Colonel (Brigadier-General) Charles Henry Westmorland, Indian Army, Brigade Commander, India.
- Colonel (Brigadier-General) Walter Fullarton Lodovic Lindsay, D.S.O., Commanding Royal Artillery, 3rd Division, Southern Command.
- Colonel Raymond Northland Revell Reade, Assistant Adjutant and Quartermaster-General, Malta.
- Colonel William Douglas, D.S.O., General Staff Officer, 1st Grade, 6th Division, Irish Command.
- Colonel (Brigadier-General) Francis Henry Rutherford Drummond, C.I.E., Indian Army, Inspector-General, Imperial Service Troops, India.
- Colonel Edward Robert John Presgrave, D.S.O., Indian. Army.
- Colonel Alfred James Whitacre Allen, half-pay.
- Colonel Henry Newport Charles Heath, General Staff Officer, 1st Grade, Headquarters of Army.
- Colonel William Henry Sitwell, D.S.O., half-pay.
- Colonel George Osbaldeston Welch, Assistant Director of Transport, Headquarters of Army.
- Colonel (Brigadier-General) Alexander Wallace, Indian Army, Brigade Commander, India.
- Colonel William Richard Yielding, C.I.E., D.S.O., Indian Army.
- Colonel (Brigadier-General) Hew Dalrymple Fanshawe, Brigadier-General 2nd Cavalry Brigade, Eastern Command.
- Lieutenant-Colonel and Brevet Colonel Kenneth Stewart Davison, Indian Army, Commandant 2nd Lancers (Gardner's Horse).
- Colonel (Brigadier-General) Henry Hughes Wilson, D.S.O., Commandant (Brigadier-General, General Staff) Staff College.
- Colonel Launcelot Edward Kiggell, General Staff Officer, 1st Grade, Headquarters of Army.
- Colonel John Townshend St Aubyn, Baron St Levan, C.V.O., Commanding Grenadier Guards and Regimental District and Commander, 2nd London Territorial Brigade, London District.
- Lieutenant-Colonel Johnston Shearer, D.S.O., Indian Medical Service.

In commemoration of the Military Operations in India in 1857 and 1858.

- Colonel Arthur Moffatt Lang, Royal (late Bengal) Engineers (Retired).
- Lieutenant-Colonel and Honorary Colonel Aylmer McIver Campbell, Indian Staff Corps (Retired).

Civil Division

- Lionel Abraham, Esq.
- Arthur Wellesley Anstruther, Esq.
- Frederick W. Black, Esq.
- Richard Durnford, Esq.
- William Evans, Esq.
- Alfred Eyles, Esq.
- Mansfeldt de Cardonnel Findlay, Esq., C.M.G.
- Alexander Freeman King, Esq.
- William Algernon Law, Esq.
- Adolphus George Charles Liddell, Esq.
- Robert Philpot, Esq.
- Harry Butler Simpson, Esq.
- George Augustus Stevenson, Esq., M.V.O.
- John Charles Gabriel Sykes, Esq.
- Herbert Preston-Thomas, Esq.
- R. Eustre Yerburgh, Esq.

== Order of Merit ==
- Henry Jackson, Esq., D.Litt., Regius Professor of Greek, Cambridge.

== Order of the Star of India ==
=== Knight Commander of the Order of the Star of India (KCSI) ===
- Charles Stuart Bayley, Esq., C.S.I, Indian Civil Service, Officiating Lieutenant-Governor, Eastern Bengal and Assam.
- Edward Norman Baker, Esq., C.S.I., Indian Civil Service, Ordinary Member of the Council of the Governor-General.
- His Highness Raj Rajeshwar Maharaja Dhiraj Sardar Singh Bahadur, of Jodhpur.
- His Highness Raj Rana Bhavvaui Singh, of Jhalawar.
- Raja Tasadduk Rasul Khan, C.S.I., of Jahangirabad, Oudh.

=== Companion of the Order of the Star of India (CSI) ===
- Michael Francis O'Dwyer, Esq., Indian Civil Service, Officiating Resident, Hyderabad.
- James Scorgie Meston, Esq., Indian Civil Service, Secretary to the Government of India in the Finance Department.
- George Watson Shaw, Esq., Indian Civil Service, Judicial Commissioner, Upper Burma.
- William Arbuthnot Inglis, Esq., Chief Engineer and Secretary to the Government of Bengal, Public Works Department (Irrigation, Marine, and Railway Branches), and a Member of the Council of the Lieutenant-Governor of Bengal for making Laws and Regulations.
- Romer Edward Younghusband, Esq., Indian Civil Service, Commissioner Lahore Division, and a Member of the Council of the Lieutenant-Governor of the Punjab for making Laws and Regulations.

== Order of Saint Michael and Saint George ==
=== Knight Grand Cross of the Order of St Michael and St George (GCMG) ===
- Sir Henry Moore Jackson, K.C.M.G., Governor and Commander-in-Chief of the Colony of Trinidad and Tobago.

=== Knight Commander of the Order of St Michael and St George (KCMG) ===
- Henry Hesketh Joudou Bell, Esq., C.M.G., Governor and Commander-in-Chief of the Uganda Protectorate.
- Sir Pope Alexander Cooper, Knight, the Chief Justice of Queensland.
- The Honourable Thomas Bent, Premier, Treasurer, and Minister of Railways of the State of Victoria.
- The Honourable Joseph Hector Carruthers, lately Premier and Colonial Treasurer of the State of New South Wales.
- Frederick Evans, Esq., C.V.O., C.M.G., Colonial Secretary of Gibraltar.
- Thomas Rees Price, Esq., C.M.G., General Manager of the Central South African Railways.
- Henry Francis Wilson, Esq., M.A.., C.M.G., lately Colonial Secretary of the Orange River Colony.

=== Companion of the Order of St Michael and St George (CMG) ===
- Lieutenant-Colonel the Honourable Newton James Moore, Premier and Minister for Lands of the State of Western Australia.
- Charles Calvert Bowring, Esq., Treasurer of the East Africa Protectorate.
- Edward Lewis Brockman, Esq., Federal Secretary, Federated Malay States.
- John William Honey, Esq., Director of Customs for the Transvaal, and Customs Adviser to the High Commissioner for South Africa.
- Philip David Warren, Esq., Surveyor-General of the Island of Ceylon.
- William Frederick King, Esq., LLD., Chief Astronomer, Department of the Interior, Dominion of Canada.
- Edward Howard Marsh, Esq., M.A., of the Colonial Office.
- James Jonathan Thomas, Esq., Unofficial Member of the Legislative Council of the Colony of Sierra Leone.
- Wei Yuk, Esq., Unofficial Member of the Legislative Council of the Colony of Hong Kong.
- Major and Brevet Lieutenant-Colonel Charles Richard Mackey O'Brien, late Deputy-Commissioner, Transvaal Town Police.
- Captain William Hartley Maud, for services in connection with the West African Frontier Force.
- Captain Frederick Gordon Guggisberg, R.E., for services in connection with the Survey of the Gold Coast Colony and Ashanti.
- Sydney Thirlwall Harrisson, Esq., lately Treasurer of the Protectorate of Northern Nigeria.

== Order of the Indian Empire ==
=== Knight Commander of the Order of the Indian Empire (KCIE) ===
- Honorary Colonel Nawab Muhammad Aslam Khan, Sardar Bahadur, C.I.E., Honorary Aide-de-Camp to His Majesty The King, 5th Bengal Cavalry (retired).
- Thomas Henry Holland, Esq., F.R.S., Director of the Geological Survey of India.
- Nawab Afsar-i-Jang Afsar-ud-Daula Bahadur Honorary Lieutenant-Colonel Muhammad Ali Beg, C.I.E., M.V.O., of Hyderabad.

=== Companion of the Order of the Indian Empire (CIE) ===
- Alfred Gibbs Bourne, Esq., D.Sc., F.R.S, Director of Public Instruction, Madras, and an additional Member of the Council of the Governor of Fort St. George for making Laws and Regulations.
- Arthur Milford Ker, Esq., a Member of the Council of the Lieutenant-Governor of the Punjab for making Laws and Regulations.
- Captain George Hayley Hewett, R.N., Honorary Aide-de-Camp to the Viceroy, Director of the Royal Indian Marine.
- Evasio Hampden Radice, Esq., Indian Civil Service, Magistrate, and Collector of Benares.
- Ralph Buller Hughes-Buller, Esq., Indian Civil Service, Magistrate and Collector, Bakarganj.
- Lieutenant-Colonel Joseph Binning, V.D., Commandant, 2nd (Presidency) Battalion, Calcutta Volunteer Rifles.
- Lieutenant-Colonel Francis Frederic Perry, F.R.C.S., Indian Medical Service, Honorary Surgeon to the Viceroy, Principal of the Medical College, Lahore.
- Major Francis Granville Beville, Political Agent in Bhopawar.
- Michael Filose, Esq., Chief Secretary to His Highness the Maharaja Scindhia of Gwalior.
- Rai Sahib Diwan Daya Kishen Kaal, Private Secretary to His Highness the Maharaja of Kashmir and Jammu.

== Royal Victorian Order ==
=== Knight Commander of the Royal Victorian Order (KCVO) ===
- Sir Edward Birkbeck, Bart.
- Rear-Admiral James Edward Clifford Goodrich, M.V.O., Admiral Superintendent and in charge of all His Majesty's Naval Establishments at Gibraltar.
- Commodore Colin Richard Keppel, C.V.O.. C.B., D.S.O., Ad.C., Commanding His Majesty's Yachts.

=== Commander of the Royal Victorian Order (CVO) ===
- François Flameng, Membre de l'Institut de France. (Honorary)
- Colonel Sir John Smith Young, M.V.O., late Secretary, Royal Patriotic Fund.
- John David Rees, Esq., C.I.E., M.P.

=== Member of the Royal Victorian Order, 4th class ===
- The Reverend Walter Boyce, Head Master, King Edward VII Grammar School, King's Lynn.
- Percy John de Paravicini, Esq., Chairman of the Committee of King Edward VII Hospital and Dispensary, Windsor.

=== Member of the Royal Victorian Order, 5th class ===
- Lieutenant Thomas Ready, RN, retired, late His Majesty's Yacht "Osborne."
- Carpenter-Lieutenant James Rice RN, His Majesty's Yacht "Victoria and Albert."
- Second Lieutenant John Mackenzie Rogan, Mus.Doc., Bandmaster, Coldstream Guards.
- Second Lieutenant Charles William Hemphill Hall, Bandmaster, 2nd Life Guards.
- Second Lieutenant Albert Williams, Mus.Doc., Bandmaster, Grenadier Guards.

== Imperial Service Order ==
- Thomas Allchiii, Esq., Assistant Commissioner, Charity Commission.
- Justin Charles William Alvarez, Esq., Consul-General, Tripoli..
- George Nealon Babbit, Esq., Deputy Receiver-General of the Province of New Brunswick, Dominion of Canada.
- John Walter Bailey. Esq., late Assistant Chief Inspector of Excise.
- James Dyer-Ball, Esq., Chief Interpreter to the Supreme Court of the Colony of Hong Kong.
- John Redman Bovell, Esq., Agricultural Superintendent, Imperial Department of Agriculture for the West Indies, and Superintendent of the Botanic Station, Barbados.
- George Andrew Breading, Esq., Clerk, Higher Division, War Office.
- James Edwin Christoffelsz, Esq., Chief Clerk, Secretariat, Island of Ceylon.
- Adolphus Philip Clapin, Esq., late Clerk Assistant of the Legislative Council of the State of .New South- W ales.
- Miss Margaret Susan Creswell, late Postmistress, Post Office and Savings Bank Department, Gibraltar.
- David Dolton, Esq., Principal Clerk, Legal Department, Local Government Board.
- Richard Uriah Falkus, Esq., Staff Clerk, Secretary's Department, Admiralty.
- John Fraser, Esq., Auditor-General of the Dominion of Canada.
- William George Lewis, Esq., Chief Surveyor General, Customs.
- Redmond Nash, Esq., Accountant, Office of National Education, Ireland.
- Jasper Alexander Redgrave, Esq., Superintending Inspector of Factories, Midland Division), Home Office.
- Johannes Smuts, Esq., Registrar of Deeds, Transvaal.
- Alexander George Denison Taylor. Esq., Clerk of English Journals, House of Commons of the Dominion of Canada.
- James Arthur Thompson, Esq., Accountant to the Department of Defence, Commonwealth of Australia.
- John Henry Richard West, Esq.. Assistant Controller, Savings Bank Department, Post Office.
