= Grinlinton =

Grinlinton is a surname. Notable people with the surname include:

- John Grinlinton, British Ceylon politician
- F. H. Grinlinton, Surveyor General of Ceylon
