= Galwadugoda Grama Niladhari Division =

Galwadugoda
- Grama Niladhari Division
- Nugawela Central College is located within, nearby or associated with the Galwadugoda Grama Niladhari Division
- Interactive map of Galwadugoda
- Coordinates: 6.047192°N 80.209593°E
- Country: Sri Lanka
- Province: Southern Province
- District: Galle District
- Divisional Secretariat: Galle Four Gravets Divisional Secretariat
- Electoral District: Galle Electoral District
- Polling Division: Galle Polling Division

Area
  - Total: 0.5 km^{2} (0.19 sq mi)
- Elevation: 10 m (33 ft)

Population (2012)
  - Total: 2,960
  - Density: 5,920/km^{2} (15,300/sq mi)
- ISO 3166 code: LK-3139110

Galwadugoda

Galwadugoda Grama Niladhari Division is a Grama Niladhari Division of the Galle Four Gravets Divisional Secretariat of Galle District of Southern Province, Sri Lanka . It has Grama Niladhari Division Code 96B.

Nugawela Central College, Mahinda College, Galle, Richmond College, Galle, Revatha College, Balapitiya and Rippon College are located within, nearby or associated with Galwadugoda.

Galwadugoda is a surrounded by the Bataganvila, Sanghamittapura, Kandewatta, Kumbalwella South and Richmond Kanda Grama Niladhari Divisions.

== Demographics ==
=== Ethnicity ===
The Galwadugoda Grama Niladhari Division has a Sinhalese majority (99.9%) . In comparison, the Galle Four Gravets Divisional Secretariat (which contains the Galwadugoda Grama Niladhari Division) has a Sinhalese majority (66.8%) and a significant Moor population (32.1%)

Ethnicity in Galwadugoda
1. Sinhalese (99.9%)
2. Other (0.10%)

=== Religion ===
The Galwadugoda Grama Niladhari Division has a Buddhist majority (99.4%) . In comparison, the Galle Four Gravets Divisional Secretariat (which contains the Galwadugoda Grama Niladhari Division) has a Buddhist majority (65.7%) and a significant Muslim population (32.3%)

Religion in Galwadugoda
1. Buddhist (99.4%)
2. Other (0.60%)

== Gallery ==

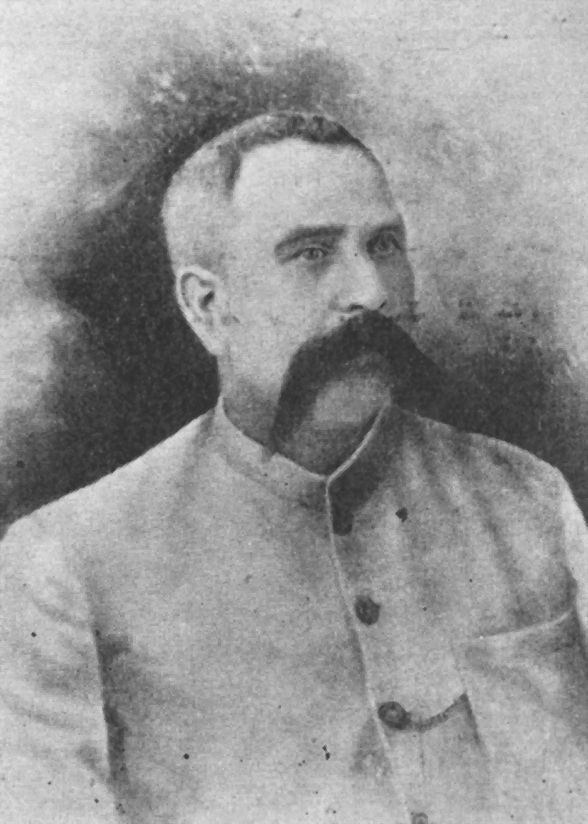

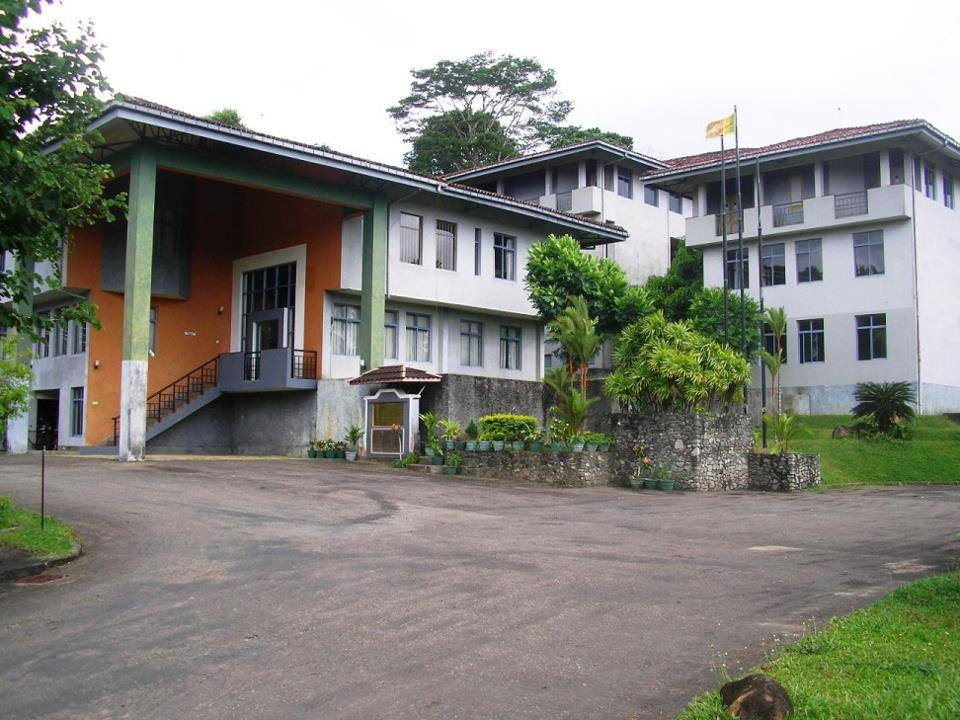
