= Charitha =

Charitha is a given name. Notable people with the name include:

- Charitha Buddhika (born 1980), Sri Lankan cricketer
- Charitha Herath (born 1967) Sri Lankan politician
- Charitha Kumarasinghe (born 1992), Sri Lankan cricketer
- Charitha Pattiaratchi, Sri Lankan professor
- Charitha Priyadarshani (born 1967), Sri Lankan singer
- Charitha Ratwatte III (born 1948), Sri Lankan cricketer
- Gowru Charitha Reddy (born 1971), Indian politician
