= Richard Durnford Jr. =

Secretary to the Charity Commissioners for England and Wales

Richard Durnford

Secretary to the Charity Commissioners for England and Wales
- In office 5 March 1900 – 10 January 1934
- Appointed by: Queen Victoria
- Preceded by: Daniel Robert Fearon
- Succeeded by: Thomas Bowyear

Assistant Commissioner to the Charity Commissioners for England and Wales
- In office 26 March 1891 – 5 March 1990
- Appointed by: Civil Service Commission

Personal details
- Born: 28 June 1843
- Died: 10 January 1934 (aged 90)
- Parents: Richard Durnford; Emma Durnford
- Education: Eton College
- Alma mater: University of Cambridge
- Awards: Companion of the Order of the Bath

Richard Durnford Jr. CB, JP (28 June 1843 – 10 January 1934) was a British civil servant. He served as Secretary to the Charity Commissioners of England and Wales from 1891 to 1908.

== Early life and education ==
Richard Durnford Jr. was born on 28 June 1843 in Hartley Wespall House, Basingstoke, Hampshire, England to Richard Durnford, Bishop of Chichester, and Emma Durnford.

Durnford attended Eton College and won a scholarship to study Classical Tripos at King's College, Cambridge, matriculating in 1861.

Durnford earned his B.A. in 1865 (first-class), winning the Camden Medal for Latin composition. Durnford obtained an M.A in 1868 and was a Fellow of King's College from 1866 to 1885.

Durnford was admitted to the Inner Temple on 20 January 1866 and was called to the Bar in 1869.

== Career ==
Durnford served as Private Secretary to the Duke of Richmond, Lord President of the Council, from 1875 to 1877, leaving to become the Assistant Commissioner to Charity Commissioners of England and Wales.

On 26 March 1891, Durnford was re-appointed Assistant Commissioner to the Charity Commissioners of England and Wales.

In 1893, Durnford was mentioned in a Question to the Parliamentary Charity Commissioner for writing a biased report.

On 5 March 1900, Durnford was promoted and took the position of Secretary to the Charity Commissioners of England and Wales.

Durnford retired on 14 July 1908 and was replaced by Thomas Bowyear as Secretary to the Charity Commissioners of England and Wales. Before his retirement, Durnford was made a Companion of the Order of the Bath in the 1908 Birthday Honours on 26 June 1908.

== Later life and death ==
Durnford served as justice of the peace for Hampshire and continued serving on the bench to his 80s.

Durnford died on 10 January 1934 in Hartley Wespall House, Basingstoke, Hampshire, England. At the time of his death, he was believed to be the oldest living Etonian. Durnford was buried in St Mary's Church, Hartley Wespall, Hampshire.

== Personal life ==
Durnford married Beatrice Mary Durnford (née Selby) in 1884 Kensington, London. They had six children, Captain Richard Selby Durnford (1885 – 31 July 1915), Hugh George Edmund Durnford (1886 – 6 June 1965), Violet Mary Durnford (1 April 1890 – 3 May 1982), Vice-Admiral John Walter Durnford (25 October 1891 – 7 February 1967) Beatrice Emma Durnford (1893 – 5 December 1955) and Robert Chichester Durnford (born 1886 – 21 June 1918).

Captain Richard Selby Durnford was killed in action in Hooge, Flanders Fields on 31 July 1915 aged 30 and Captain Robert Chichester was killed in action in Persia on 21 June June 1918 aged 22. They are commemorated in the memorials at St Mary's Church, Hartley Wespall, Hampshire and Eton College. Durnford wrote a poem, omnia patriae, nihil sibi (everything for country, nothing for himself) in his sons' memory.
