= T. Somasekaram =

Sri Lanka Sikhamani Thamotharam Somasekaram FRGS

37th Surveyor General of Sri Lanka
- In office 1991–1992
- Preceded by: E. M. Perera
- Succeeded by: S. Berugoda

Personal details
- Born: 22 September 1934
- Died: 11 March 2010 (aged 75)
- Education: Jaffna Hindu College; University of Ceylon; Fitzwilliam College; Ohio State University
- Profession: Surveyor
- Ethnicity: Sri Lankan Tamil

Sri Lanka Sikhamani Thamotharam Somasekaram (22 September 1934 – 11 March 2010) was a leading Sri Lankan Tamil geographer and Surveyor General.

== Early life and family ==
Somasekaram was born on 22 September 1934. He was educated at the Jaffna Hindu College. After school he joined the University of Ceylon, Colombo from where he graduated in 1956 with a BSc degree.

Somasekaram married Sathanithi. They had three children (Damayanthi, Jayanthi and Arjun).

== Career ==
After university Somasekaram joined the Government Survey Department as an Assistant Superintendent of Surveys. A year later he joined Fitzwilliam College, Cambridge in 1958 to study the Part II course in geography, which he completed in 1959. On returning to Ceylon he rejoined the Survey Department. He became Superintendent of Surveys in 1967, Assistant Surveyor General in 1971 and Deputy Surveyor General in 1973. The latter position made in head of the Institute of Surveying and Mapping.

Somasekaram joined the Ohio State University in 1976 on a United Nations Fellowship, graduating with an MSc in Geodesy and Cartography.

Somasekaram became Surveyor General in 1991. He came up with the idea of the Sri Lankan Atlas and chaired the committee charged with creating it. He was awarded the Sri Lanka Sikhamani title, a Sri Lankan national honour, in 1990 for this work.

Somasekaram was president of the Surveyors' Institute of Sri Lanka (1985–87) and the Sri Lanka Association for the Advancement of Science. In 1998 he was admitted as a fellow of the Royal Geographical Society and received an honorary doctorate from the University of Jaffna. He was vice-president of the Organisation of Professional Associations of Sri Lanka between 1985 and 1991 and a member of the Canadian Institute of Geomatics.

== Later life ==
Somasekaram wrote a number of books after retirement. Among them are: Surveying Stories, and Arjuna's A-Z Street Guide.

He died on 11 March 2010.

Government offices
Preceded by E. M. Perera	Surveyor General of Sri Lanka; 1991–1992	Succeeded by S. Berugoda
