= Francis Norreys =

Francis Norreys (also spelled Norris) may refer to:

- Francis Norris, 1st Earl of Berkshire (1579–1622), English peer
- Francis Norreys (1609–1669), English politician, illegitimate son of the above
- Francis Norreys (1666–1706), English politician, grandson of the above
- Frank Norris (bishop) (1864–1945), Anglican missionary bishop
- Francis Brooke Norris (1801–1879), British colonial administrator
