= Palitha Udayakantha =

Sri Lankan Surveyor General

- Born: Panik Mudiyanselage Palitha Udayakantha
- Education: University of Ruhuna, Ohio State University
- Occupation: Surveyor
- Title: Surveyor General of Sri Lanka
- Term: 30 May 2014 – May 2019
- Predecessor: Nihal Gunawardena
- Successor: S. M. P. P. Sangakkara

Palitha Udayakantha was the 47th Surveyor General of Sri Lanka, serving in office between 2014 and 2019.

Udayakantha received his primary and secondary education at Galagedara primary school and Nugawela Central College respectively. He graduated from the University of Ruhuna with a degree in physical science, before joining the Survey Department of Sri Lanka in 1983, as an Assistant Superintendent of Surveys. He obtained a higher diploma in surveying from the Institute of Surveying and Mapping, Diyatalawa, and was awarded a gold medal by the Sri Lanka Surveyors Institute for his achievements. In 1988 he obtained a master's degree in geodetic science from Ohio State University.

Udayakantha was also a lecturer at the Institute of Surveying and Mapping, and later served as a senior assistant secretary at the Ministry of Land and Land Development, where he contributed to improving land registration and to developing the Bim Saviya programme. On 24 August 2007 he was registered as a surveyor by the Land Survey Council of Sri Lanka.

While working as senior deputy surveyor general (mapping), he was also a member of the editorial committee of Sri Lanka National Atlas and initiated programmes to expedite mapping activities.

In March 2014 he was appointed the vice-chairman of the Land Survey Council and subsequently elevated to chairman in May.

Udayakantha took up the role of Surveyor General of Sri Lanka on 30 May 2014, succeeding Nihal Gunawardena. He was a member of the National Steering Committee which oversaw the establishment of the National Spatial Data Infrastructure, a website for facilitating online access to geo-spatial information in Sri Lanka.

He retired in March 2019 and was replaced by S. M. P. P. Sangakkara.

== Publications ==
- Madarasinghe, S. K., Yapa, Kanthi, Udayakantha, P.M.P., Satyanarayana, B. (2024). Land-use and land cover changes along the coastal belt of Hambantota district, southern Sri Lanka, over the period 1996- 2017 Journal of the National Science Foundation of Sri Lanka. 51. 10.4038/jnsfsr.v51i4.11286.
- Madarasinghe, S. K., Yapa, Kanthi, Satyanarayana, Behara, Udayakantha, P. M. P., Kodikara Kas, Loku Pulukkuttige (2020). Inland Irrigation Project Causes Disappearance of Coastal Lagoon: The Trajectory of Kalametiya Lagoon, Sri Lanka from 1956 to 2016 Coastal Management. 48. 1-22. 10.1080/08920753.2020.1747914.
- Madarasinghe, S. k., Yapa, Kanthi, Satyanarayana, Behara, Udayakantha, P. M. P., Kodikara, Kas, Loku Pulukkuttige, Jayatissa. (2018). Current Extent and Distribution of Mangrove Cover in the Southern Coastal Belt of Sri Lanka – A Field Validated Remote Sensing Study.

Government offices
Preceded by Nihal Gunawardena	Surveyor General of Sri Lanka; 2014–2019	Succeeded by S. M. P. P. Sangakkara
