= William Gosset =

William Gosset may refer to:

- William Sealy Gosset, English statistician, chemist and brewer
- William Gosset (politician), British Army officer and member of parliament
- William Driscoll Gosset, British Army officer, engineer and surveyor
