= Fyers =

Fyers is a surname. Notable people with the surname include:

- A. B. Fyers (1829–1883), British surveyor in Ceylon
- William Fyers (1815–1895), British Army officer

== Fictional characters ==
- Eddie Fyers, character in DC Comics
