= Vanniasingam =

Vanniasingam is a surname. Notable people with the surname include:

- C. Vanniasingam (1911–1959), Ceylon Tamil lawyer
- C. Vanniasingam (Surveyor General), Surveyor General of Sri Lanka
