= Wickwar (surname) =

Wickwar is a surname. Notable people with the surname include:

- A. J. Wickwar, 15th Surveyor General of Ceylon
- Len Wickwar (1911–1980), British boxer
