= C. B. King =

C. B. King may refer to:

- Chevene Bowers King (1923–1988), African American attorney and civil rights leader
- C. B. King (Surveyor General), Surveyor General of Sri Lanka, 1951–1954
- Charles Brady King, automotive pioneer, engineer and inventor
