= S. M. W. Fernando =

44th Surveyor General of Sri Lanka
- In office 2009–2013
- Preceded by: B. J. P. Mendis
- Succeeded by: Kanagaratnam Thavalingam

S. M. W. Fernando was the 44th Surveyor General of Sri Lanka. He was appointed in 2009, succeeding B. J. P. Mendis, and held the office until 2013. He was succeeded by Kanagaratnam Thavalingam.

Government offices
Preceded by B. J. P. Mendis	Surveyor General of Sri Lanka; 2009–2013	Succeeded by Kanagaratnam Thavalingam
