= Bengough =

Bengough may refer to:

== Places ==
- Bengough, Saskatchewan, a town in Canada
- Bengough (electoral district), a provincial electoral district in Saskatchewan
- Rural Municipality of Bengough No. 40, Saskatchewan, a rural municipality in Canada

== People ==
- Harcourt Mortimer Bengough (1837–1922), British soldier
- John Wilson Bengough (1851–1923), Canadian cartoonist
- Benny Bengough (1898–1968), American baseball player
