= Nugawela Central College =

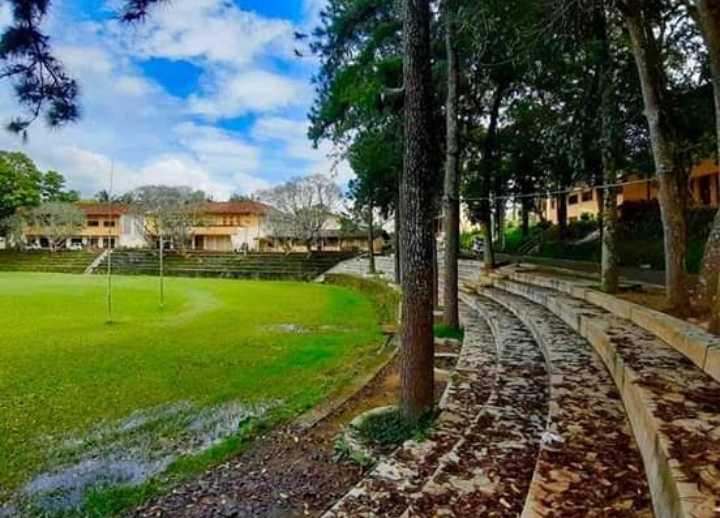
- Nugawela Central College

Location
- Kandy; Sri Lanka; 7.355103697940297°N 80.59085368488547°E

Information
- School type: National 1AB
- Motto: Seek Recognition through Wisdom
- Religious affiliation: Buddhism
- Established: 4 January 1944 (82 years ago)
- Founder: C. W. W. Kannangara
- School district: Kandy District
- School code: 03075
- Principal: N. C. P. T. Nishshanka
- Staff: 680+
- Grades: 6 to G.C.E. (A/L)
- Gender: Boys/girls
- Age: 11 to 19
- Enrollment: 6,500+
- Language: Sinhala, English
- Schedule: 07:30 - 13:30
- Campus size: 8.5 ha (21 acres)
- Houses: Gamunu; Parakrama; Thissa; Vijaya
- Colors: Maroon, gray and blue
- Song: Sarade Pura Sada Lesa Sarade
- Athletics: Yes
- Sports: Yes
- Alumni: Past Pupil Association
- Abbreviation: NCC
- Website: www.nugawelacentralcollege.com

Nugawela Central College (Sinhala: නුගවෙල මධ්‍ය විද්‍යාලය) is a public, mixed government school located in Kandy District, Sri Lanka. The school was founded on 4 January 1944 as part of the Central College initiative introduced by Dr. C. W. W. Kannangara, it serves over 6,500 students from grade 6 to grade 13, with a teaching staff of more than 650. The school was established to provide free, high-quality education to rural students. Originally housed in a small building, the school has grown over the years and now offers a range of academic and extracurricular programs.

== History ==
Nugawela Central College (NCC), was established on 4 January 1944, under Sri Lanka's Central Schools Program, launched by Dr. C. W. W. Kannangara. This program was part of a nationwide initiative to offer high-quality education across all regions, especially rural areas. E. A. Nugawela, a local politician, supported this initiative, while his brother, Hugh, donated the school's land. The first principal, A. W. Mayadunne, was vital in setting up the school's foundational academic and administrative systems.

At first, the school focused on providing secondary education, specifically in core subjects such as science, mathematics, and language studies. The school has since introduced Advanced Level streams, such as Arts, Science, and Commerce, which allow students to pursue higher studies and professional qualifications.

The school's extracurricular activities include a science society, debate club, and literary society. The school also encourages participation in traditional Sri Lankan cultural events. Sports facilities include cricket, athletics, and swimming.

== Principals ==
- A. W Mayadunne (1944.01.01 - 1944.06.01)
- M. B. S. Paleepana (1944.06.01 - 1944.11.06)
- Lionel Lokuliyana (1944.11.06 -1948.03.27)
- C. L. W. Abeygunasekara (1948.05.10 - 1953.01.29)
- D. A. Devendra (1953.09.01 - 1956.05.31)
- D. A. Weerasinghe (1956.07.01 - 1962.05.01)
- C. Ranhoti (1962.05.01 - 1968.06.01)
- K. S. Gunarathne (1968.05.01 - 1969.01.14)
- D. B. Dissanayaka (1971.01.05 - 1971.01.01)
- G. J. Sarathehandra (1972.01.07 - 1973.12.28)
- B. Gunasekara (1974.01.01 - 1974.12.28)
- T. B. Basnayaka (1974.01.01 - 1974.01.15)
- G. Somapala (1974.10.18 - 1977.09.05)
- R. Premarathne (1977.09.05 - 1987.01.31)
- J. A. S. Jayalath (1987.09.15 - 1988.05.21)
- D. M. Thilakarathne Banda (1986.02.01 - 1992.05.18)
- B. A. Abeyrathne (1992.05.18 - 1997.09.17)
- H. M. G. Herath (1998.03.05 - 2001.02.11)
- D. A. Hettiarachchi (2001.09.29 - 2010.02.4)
- R. P. W. K. Rajapaksha (2010.02.4 - 2017.12.08)
- T. M. S. K. Thennakoon (2017.12.08 - 2023.1.12)
- Dhammika Bandhara (2023.1.12 - 2024.3.15)
- R. B. W. A. M. Hasanthi Rajaguru (2024.3.15 - 2026.06.04)
- N. C. P. T. Nishshanka (2026.06.04 - present)

== School culture ==
A portion of Nugawela Central College's anthem "Sarade Purasada Lesa Sarade"

The official anthem, "Sarade Purasada Lesa Sarade", introduced in 1958, was written by a teacher, Rajakeeya Pandita Nugawela Pannajothi Thero. The melody was composed by D. G. Edoris, also a teacher at the school.

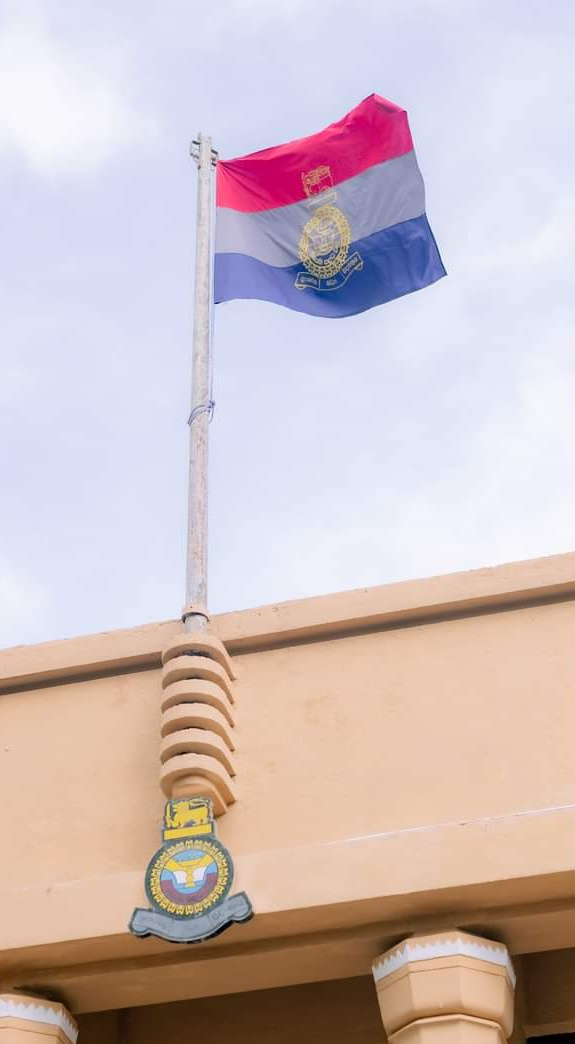
Nugawela Central College Flag

The school flag features three colours: red, white, and blue. The flag serves as a visual identity for the school and is prominently displayed during school events and ceremonies.

Nugawela Central College established its house system in 1944, dividing students into four houses named after ancient Sri Lankan kings: Gamunu (red), Parakrama (blue), Thissa (green), and Vijaya (yellow). The different colours are intended to reflect the heritage of Sri Lanka.

== Sports ==
=== Big Match ===
The annual Battle of Blue and Gold cricket match between Nugawela Central College and A. Rathnayake Central College has been held since 2004 at the Asgiriya Stadium in Kandy. By 2024, Nugawela Central has led the series with five victories, while Walala A. Ratnayake Central has secured four wins. In 2002 Nugawela Central claimed victory by five wickets, while Walala Central won in 2019 with a 9-wicket lead.

=== Cricket ===
The school's cricket team has participated in numerous regional and national tournaments.

=== Swimming ===
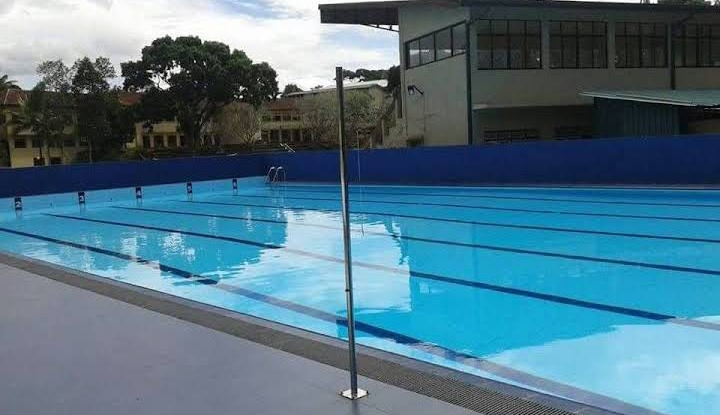
Swimming pool

The swimming pool at the college, opened in 2015, is 25 m (82 ft) in length, 2 m (6 ft 7 in) in depth, and has eight lanes.

=== Rugby ===
The school's rugby team competes in provincial and national tournaments.

== Notable alumni ==
Former students of Nugawela Central College are known as Past Pupil Association

Name	Notability	Reference
Harispattuwe Ariyawanshalankara	Buddhist monk	
Edward Jayakody	Musician, singer, composer	
Lahiru Samarakoon	Cricket player	
Palitha Udayakantha	Surveyor General of Sri Lanka (2014–2019)	
Charitha Priyadarshani	Singer, announcer	
Larry Wijeratne	Major General Sri Lankan Army Brigade Commander of 532 Brigade	
Saranga Rajaguru	Cricketer	
