= Harispattuwe Ariyawanshalankara =

Buddhist monk in Sri Lanka

Ven. Harispattuwe Ariyawanshalankara Nayaka Thera (1939–2014) was a Buddhist monk in Sri Lanka. He was popular as a pious monk who had delivered great service to both Buddhism and society in Sri Lanka.

== Early life ==
He was born in the village of Maruddana as Dharmasena Ariyathilaka, in Kandy on 18 October 1939. his father was a businessman, Lamanige Jemis Sinho, and his mother, Pathirajage Gunavathi, were both from Harsipattuwa. His childhood was marked with poverty after the death of his father. He received his education at Molagoda School, Nugawela Central College and the Pirivenas, obtaining degrees from the Vidyalankara University and Buddhist and Pali University of Sri Lanka. He also obtained a Diploma in Education from the Open University of Sri Lanka. He started his career as a teacher and retired in 1975. He became a Buddhist monk in Ramanna Nikaya in 2000. He obtained a doctorate at the age of 74 from University of Kelaniya.

== Service to Buddhism and society ==
He functioned as the Chief Incumbent of International Vipassana Meditation Center of Colombo for 13 years, through which meditation became popular among the Buddhist laymen. He appeared in popular television shows like Doramandalawa in Dhamma discussions and delivered many Dhamma sermons, which were popular among the people. Venerable Harispattuwe Ariyawanshalankara Thera was also a philanthropist who had donated money he received for the benefit of the society rather than his own use. He died in 2014. The funeral was plainly held and even the money collected for the ceremony was used to construct a house for a needy family as the last will of Thera before his death. He was also the chairman of Temperance Movement of Sri Lanka and has written several books on Buddhism.
