= R. A. Gunawardana =

31st Surveyor General of Sri Lanka
- In office 1971–1973
- Preceded by: C. Vanniasingam
- Succeeded by: A. M. Cumaraswamy

R. A. Gunawardana was the 31st Surveyor General of Sri Lanka. He was appointed in 1971, succeeding C. Vanniasingam, and held the office until 1973. He was succeeded by A. M. Cumaraswamy.

Government offices
Preceded by C. Vanniasingam	Surveyor General of Sri Lanka; 1971–1973	Succeeded by A. M. Cumaraswamy
