= W. H. Simms =

Surveyor General of Ceylon

5th Surveyor General of Ceylon
- In office 1846–1854
- Preceded by: F. B. Norris
- Succeeded by: W. D. Gosset

Personal details
- Born: William Henry Simms

William Henry Simms was a British colonial administrator who was the fifth Surveyor General of Ceylon. He was appointed in 1846, succeeding F. B. Norris, and held the office until 1854. He was succeeded by W. D. Gosset.

Government offices
Preceded by F. B. Norris	Surveyor General of Ceylon; 1846–1854	Succeeded by W. D. Gosset
