= A. H. G. Dawson =

British engineer

16th Surveyor General of Ceylon
- In office 1927–1932
- Preceded by: A. J. Wickwar
- Succeeded by: G. K. Thornhill

Personal details
- Born: Arthur Harry Gerald Dawson; 20 August 1876 Colombo, Ceylon
- Died: 10 December 1957 (aged 81) Budleigh Salterton, Devon, England

Arthur Harry Gerald Dawson (20 August 1876 – 10 December 1957) was a British engineer who was the 16th Surveyor General of Ceylon. He was appointed in 1927, succeeding A. J. Wickwar, and held the office until 1932. He was succeeded by G. K. Thornhill.

He married Norah Matheson, daughter of Sir Alexander Matheson, 3rd Baronet.

Government offices
Preceded by A. J. Wickwar	Surveyor General of Ceylon; 1927–1932	Succeeded by G. K. Thornhill
