= Henry Byrde =

British military person

Lieutenant-Colonel Henry Byrde
- Military career
- Allegiance: British Ceylon
- Branch: Ceylon Defence Force
- Rank: Lieutenant-Colonel
- Unit: 57th Regiment of Foot
- Commands: Commander of the Ceylon Volunteers

Lieutenant-Colonel Henry Byrde was the 2nd Commander of the Ceylon Volunteers. He was appointed on 28 August 1893 until 13 May 1896. He was succeeded by A. F. C. Vincent.

Military offices
Preceded by Francis Coningsby Hannam Clarke	Commander of the Ceylon Volunteers; 1893–1896	Succeeded by A. F. C. Vincent as Commander of the Ceylon Volunteers Force
