= C. T. Goonawardana =

29th Surveyor General of Sri Lanka
- In office 1968–1970
- Preceded by: P. U. Ratnatunga
- Succeeded by: C. Vanniasingam

C. T. Goonawardana was the 29th Surveyor General of Sri Lanka. He was appointed in 1968, succeeding P. U. Ratnatunga, and held the office until 1970. He was succeeded by C. Vanniasingam.

Government offices
Preceded by P. U. Ratnatunga	Surveyor General of Sri Lanka; 1968–1970	Succeeded by C. Vanniasingam
