= B. J. P. Mendis =

43rd Surveyor General of Sri Lanka
- In office 2004–2009
- Preceded by: P. A. Ariyaratne
- Succeeded by: S. M. W. Fernando

Personal details
- Died: February 2009

B. J. P. Mendis (died February 2009) was the 43rd Surveyor General of Sri Lanka. He was appointed in 2004, succeeding P. A. Ariyaratne, and held the office until 2009. He was succeeded by S. M. W. Fernando.

Government offices
Preceded by P. A. Ariyaratne	Surveyor General of Sri Lanka; 2004–2009	Succeeded by S. M. W. Fernando
