= David G. Mantell =

Tenth Surveyor General of Ceylon

10th Surveyor General of Ceylon
- In office 1894–1896
- Preceded by: P. C. H. Clarke
- Succeeded by: F. H. Grinlinton

Personal details
- Born: David George Mantell; 31 December 1836 Girvan, Ayrshire, Scotland
- Died: 13 December 1904 (aged 67) Ceylon House, Bedford, England

David George Mantell (31 December 1836 – 13 December 1904) was a Scottish engineer who was the tenth Surveyor General of Ceylon and the first Chief Surveyor. He was appointed in 1894, succeeding P. C. H. Clarke, and held the office until 1896. He was succeeded by F. H. Grinlinton.

Government offices
Preceded by P. C. H. Clarke	Surveyor General of Ceylon; 1894–1896	Succeeded by F. H. Grinlinton
