= P. A. Ariyaratne =

Sri Lankan Politician

42nd Surveyor General of Sri Lanka
- In office 2003–2004
- Preceded by: K. L. A. Ranasinghe Silva
- Succeeded by: B. J. P. Mendis

P. A. Ariyaratne was the 42nd Surveyor General of Sri Lanka. He was appointed in 2003, succeeding K. L. A. Ranasinghe Silva, and held the office until 2004. He was succeeded by B. J. P. Mendis.

Government offices
Preceded by K. L. A. Ranasinghe Silva	Surveyor General of Sri Lanka; 2003–2004	Succeeded by B. J. P. Mendis
