= S. Karthigesu =

25th Surveyor General of Sri Lanka from 1961 to 1965

25th Surveyor General of Sri Lanka
- In office 1961–1965
- Preceded by: J. L. T. E. Dassenaike
- Succeeded by: J. C. Chanmugam

S. Karthigesu was the 25th Surveyor General of Sri Lanka. He was appointed in 1961, succeeding J. L. T. E. Dassenaike, and held the office until 1965. He was succeeded by J. C. Chanmugam.

Government offices
Preceded by J. L. T. E. Dassenaike	Surveyor General of Sri Lanka; 1961–1965	Succeeded by J. C. Chanmugam
