= P. U. Ratnatunga =

Sri Lankan public official

28th Surveyor General of Sri Lanka
- In office 1967–1968
- Preceded by: F. H. Gunasekara
- Succeeded by: C. T. Goonawardana

P. U. Ratnatunga was the 28th Surveyor General of Sri Lanka. He was appointed in 1967, succeeding F. H. Gunasekara, and held the office until 1968. He was succeeded by C. T. Goonawardana.

Government offices
| Preceded by F. H. Gunasekara | Surveyor General of Sri Lanka; 1967–1968 | Succeeded by C. T. Goonawardana |
