= Joseph Jonville =

1st Surveyor General of Ceylon
- In office 2 August 1800 – 1805
- Preceded by: Office created
- Succeeded by: George Atkinson

Personal details
- Born: Joseph Marie Eudelin Mervé de Jonville; 2 September 1756 Cairo, Egypt
- Died: 21 January 1837 (aged 80) London, England

Joseph Jonville, also known as Eudelin de Jonville (1756–1837) was a French diplomat and naturalist, who was also the first Surveyor General of Ceylon, from 1800 to 1805.

Joseph Marie Eudelin Mervé de Jonville was born on 2 September 1756 in Cairo, Egypt, the son of Thomas François Mervé de Jonville (1706-1778) and Therese Françoise née Lambert (1732-1773). Jonville spent his childhood in Smyrna, where his father was the French consul then in Toulon, when his father retired. Jonville was appointed vice-consul in Nafplio (Morea), then in Rosetta, Egypt. He retired in 1784. The French Revolution saw him emigrate to Nice, a number of cities in Italy, and finally Corsica. In October 1798, he embarked for India on an English ship. The expedition led by the first British Governor, Frederick North, explored Ceylon (Sri Lanka), Jonville was responsible for studying its botany. Jonville was first hired to survey the colony's cinnamon plantations. North however also instructed Jonville to "inquire into, and collect, whatever regards the natural philosophy, the natural history, and the meteorology of this island ... Likewise ... the customs, usages, history, and even languages of the country." On 2 August 1800 he was appointed the first Surveyor General of Ceylon holding that office until 1805. He was succeeded by George Atkinson. He wrote in French a manuscript, Quelques notions sur l'île de Ceylan (Some notions on the island of Ceylon), that he sent in 1801 to England asking his brother to have it printed, which never occurred. In July 1805, he left Ceylon for England where he led the life of a scholar. He died in London on 21 January 1837, at the age of 80.

Government offices
Preceded by Office created	Surveyor General of Ceylon; 1800–1805	Succeeded by George Atkinson
