= N. S. Perera =

22nd Surveyor General of Sri Lanka
- In office 1954–1958
- Preceded by: C. B. King
- Succeeded by: V. Rasaretnam

N. S. Perera was the 22nd Surveyor General of Sri Lanka. He was appointed in 1954, succeeding C. B. King, and held the office until 1958. He was succeeded by V. Rasaretnam.

Government offices
Preceded by G. B. King	Surveyor General of Sri Lanka; 1954–1958	Succeeded by V. Rasaretnam
