= Frederick Grinlinton =

British engineer

F. H. Grinlinton

11th Surveyor General of Ceylon
- In office 1896–1904
- Preceded by: G. D. Mantell

Personal details
- Born: Frederick Henry Grinlinton; 27 March 1853 Southampton, Hampshire, England
- Died: 11 March 1938 (aged 85) Stoke, Plymouth, Devon

Frederick Henry Grinlinton (27 March 1853 – 11 March 1938) was a British engineer who was the 11th Surveyor General of Ceylon. He entered the Ceylon Survey Department in 1870. He was appointed in 1896, succeeding David G. Mantell, and held the office until 1904. He was succeeded by Philip David Warren.

After retiring in 1904, he traveled to the Federated Malay States to advise on the creation of a Malay surveying department.

He was the son of Sir John Grinlinton.

Government offices
Preceded by D. G. Mantell	Surveyor General of Ceylon; 1896–1904	Succeeded by Philip David Warren
