= Stewart Schneider =

Member of State Council of Ceylon

7th Solicitor General of Ceylon
- In office 1917–1917
- Governor: John Anderson
- Preceded by: Thomas Garvin
- Succeeded by: Thomas Garvin

Personal details
- Born: Gualterus Stewart Schneider; 12 April 1864 Colombo, Ceylan
- Died: c. September 1938 Colombo, Ceylan
- Spouse: Glencora Barnes Potger
- Relations: Gualterus Schneider (grandfather)
- Education: St. Thomas College, Colombo

Sir Gualterus Stewart Schneider (12 April 1864 – c. September 1938) was a member of the State Council of Ceylon and the 7th Solicitor General of Ceylon. He was appointed on 1917, succeeding Thomas Garvin, and held the office until 1917. He was succeeded also by Thomas Garvin.

He was made a Knight Bachelor in the 1928 Birthday Honours. In 1931, he was appointed to the First State Council by the Governor. The State Council was ceremonially opened on 10 July 1931, and Sir Stewart was defeated by A. F. Molamure for the post of speaker by 35 to 18 votes.

He was the grandson of Gualterus Schneider, the first Surveyor-General of Ceylon.

Legal offices
Preceded by Thomas Garvin	Solicitor General of Ceylon; 1917–1917	Succeeded by Thomas Garvin
