= Muhammad Ali Beg =

Nawab Muhammad Ali Beg نواب محمد علی بیگ
- Born: 1852; Aurangabad, British India
- Died: 1930 (aged 77–78); Hyderabad, Hyderabad State
- Military career
- Allegiance: (Hyderabad State) Hyderabad
- Branch: British Indian Army
- Rank: Honorary Lieutenant-Colonel
- Commands: Commander-In-Chief, Regular Forces of Hyderabad
- Awards: Knight Commander of the Order of the Indian Empire; Member of The Royal Victorian Order

Nawab Muhammad Ali Beg, KCIE, MVO (1852–1930) was an Indian military leader from Hyderabad State, serving there and in the British Indian Army.

== Life ==
He was born Aurangabad (Deccan) in 1852 He was the son of the late Mirza Vilayet Ali Beg, Ressaldar of the 3rd Lancers, Hyderabad Contingent. From 1897 he commanded the Nizam's regular forces, and from 1884 he was aide-de-camp to the Nizam of Hyderabad, in the Ressaldar Hyderabad Contingent. He was Commander of the Golconda Brigade since 1885, in the Hyderabad Imperial Service Troops since 1893, and Commander of Regular Troops since 1897, Jagirdar, Hyderabad State.

== Career ==
- Commander of the 1st and 2nd Lancers, Hyderabad Imperial Service Troops
- Hon. Colonel 20th Deccan Horse
- 1879–80 – Afghan War, 1879–1880, medal and clasp
- 1888 – Black Mountain Expedition, medal and clasp. Mentioned in dispatches.
- 1900 – China Expedition, (medal). Sir Afsar was on staff of Count Von Waldersee during the Boxer Rebellion in 1901.
- 1902 – A.D.C for the Nizam, Sir Afsur represented Hyderabad at the coronation of King Edward VII.
- 1911 – A.D.C to Lord Hardinge, Viceroy of India
- 1915 – Staff of Imperial Service Cavalry Brigade, Indian Expeditionary Force, Egypt, 1915
- 1915–16 – Staff Indian Cavalry Corp and A.D.C to Sir John French
- 1917 – Commander-In-Chief, His Exalted Highness the Nizam's Regular Forces

== Titles ==
- 1884 – Received title of Khan Bahadur and Afsur Jung
- 1888 – Appointed Honorary Major

Muhammad Ali Beg Nawab, Afsar-i-Jang Bahadur, Aide-de-Camp to His Highness the Nizam of

Hyderabad, is grandted the honorary rank of Major. Dated 16th May 1888

— THE LONDON GAZETTE, MAY 15, 1888

- 1895 – Received title of Afsur Dowla
- 1897 – Decorated with C.I.E. on 22 June 1897 in the Jubilee Honours' Gazette

THE Queen has been graciously pleased on the occasion of the celebration of the completion of the Sixtieth Year of Her Majesty's Reign, to make the following promotions in, and appointments to, the Most Eminent Order of the Indian Empire:

To be Companions: Major Nawab Muhammad Ali Beg, Afsar-i-Jang, Bahadur, Commandant of the Hyderabad Imperial Service Lancers.

— India Office, June 22, 1897.

- 1902 – Appointed Honorary Lieutenant-Colonel

Honorary Major Muhammad Ali Beg, Nawab, Afsar-i-jung, Afsar-ud-Daula Bahadur, C.I.E. to be Honorary Lieutenant-Colonel. Dated 9th. August, 1902.

— THE LONDON GAZETTE, OCTOBER 7, 1902

- 1903 – Received title of Afur-ul-Mulk after Delhi Durbar
- 1906 – Member of the Royal Victorian Order (M.V.O)

Chancery of the Royal Victorian Order, St. James's Palace, May 15, 1906.

The KING has been graciously pleased, on the occasion of the visit of Their Royal Highnesses The Prince and Princess of Wales to India, to make the following promotion in, and appointments to the Royal Victorian Order, to take effect from the dates noted: To be Members of the Fourth Class:

15th February, 1906. Nawab Afsur-i-Jung, Afsar-ud-Daula Bahadur, Honorary Lieutenant- Colonel Muhammad Ali Beg, C.I.E., 20th Deccan Horse, and Commandant, Hyderabad Imperial Service Lancers.

- 1908 – Decorated with K.C.I.E
