= N. C. Seneviratne =

39th Surveyor General of Sri Lanka

39th Surveyor General of Sri Lanka
- In office 1993–1996
- Preceded by: S. Berugoda
- Succeeded by: M. P. Salgado

N. C. Seneviratne was the 39th Surveyor General of Sri Lanka. He was appointed in 1993, succeeding S. Berugoda, and held the office until 1996. He was succeeded by M. P. Salgado.

Government offices
Preceded by S. Berugoda	Surveyor General of Sri Lanka; 1993–1996	Succeeded by M. P. Salgado
