= K. L. A. Ranasinghe Silva =

41st Surveyor General of Sri Lanka
- In office 1996–2003
- Preceded by: M. P. Salgado
- Succeeded by: P. A. Ariyaratne

Kamburugamuva Loku Arachchige Ranasinghe Silva was the 41st Surveyor General of Sri Lanka. He was appointed in 1996, succeeding M. P. Salgado, and held the office until 2003. He was succeeded by P. A. Ariyaratne.

Government offices
Preceded by M. P. Salgado	Surveyor General of Sri Lanka; 1996–2003	Succeeded by P. A. Ariyaratne
