= L. G. O. Woodhouse =

Ceylonese surveyor

18th Surveyor General of Ceylon
- In office 1937–1943
- Preceded by: G. K. Thornhill
- Succeeded by: R. J. Johnston

Personal details
- Born: Lionel Gilbert Ollyett Woodhouse; 22 February 1888
- Died: 31 March 1965 (aged 77) Sussex, England

Lionel Gilbert Ollyett Woodhouse (22 February 1888 – 31 March 1965) was an English civil servant and naturalist who was the 18th Surveyor General of Ceylon. He was appointed in 1937, succeeding G. K. Thornhill, and held the office until 1943. He was succeeded by R. J. Johnston.

As an amateur lepidopterist, he was among the first to document the butterflies of Sri Lanka.

== Bibliography ==
- Woodhouse, L. G. O. (1950). The Butterfly Fauna of Ceylon. Colombo, Ceylon: Ceylon Government Press. p. 133. OCLC 4100749.
- Woodhouse, L. G. O. (March 1947). "Observations on Species of Nacaduba Moore, and Some Other Lycaenidae from Ceylon". Proceedings of the Royal Entomological Society of London. Series B, Taxonomy. 16 (1–2): 3–9. doi:10.1111/j.1365-3113.1947.tb00838.x.

Government offices
Preceded by G. K. Thornhill	Surveyor General of Ceylon; 1937–1943	Succeeded by R. J. Johnston
