= J. C. Chanmugam =

Surveyor General of Sri Lanka

26th Surveyor General of Sri Lanka
- In office 1965–1966
- Preceded by: S. Karthigesu
- Succeeded by: F. H. Gunasekara

J. C. Chanmugam was the 26th Surveyor General of Sri Lanka. He was appointed in 1965, succeeding S. Karthigesu, and held the office until 1966. He was succeeded by F. H. Gunasekara.

Government offices
Preceded by S. Karthigesu	Surveyor General of Sri Lanka; 1965–1966	Succeeded by F. H. Gunasekara
