= E. M. Perera =

36th Surveyor General of Sri Lanka

36th Surveyor General of Sri Lanka
- In office 1991–1991
- Preceded by: S. T. Herat
- Succeeded by: Thamotharam Somasekaram

E. M. Perera was the 36th Surveyor General of Sri Lanka. He was appointed in 1991, succeeding S. T. Herat, and held the office until 1991. He was succeeded by Thamotharam Somasekaram.

Government offices
Preceded by S. T. Herat	Surveyor General of Sri Lanka; 1991	Succeeded by Thamotharam Somasekaram
