= F. H. Gunasekara =

27th Surveyor General of Sri Lanka

27th Surveyor General of Sri Lanka
- In office 1966–1967
- Preceded by: J. C. Chanmugam
- Succeeded by: P. U. Ratnatunga

F. H. Gunasekara was the 27th Surveyor General of Sri Lanka. He was appointed in 1966, succeeding J. C. Chanmugam, and held the office until 1967. He was succeeded by P. U. Ratnatunga.

Government offices
Preceded by J. C. Chanmugam	Surveyor General of Sri Lanka; 1966–1967	Succeeded by P. U. Ratnatunga
