= George Atkinson (Surveyor General) =

Surveyor General of Ceylon

2nd Surveyor General of Ceylon
- In office 1805–1811
- Preceded by: Joseph Jonville
- Succeeded by: Gualterus Schneider

Personal details
- Children: Maria Elisabeth

George Atkinson was the second Surveyor General of Ceylon. He was appointed in 1805, succeeding J. Johnwil, and held the office until 1811. He was succeeded by Gualterus Schneider.

His daughter, Maria Elisabeth, married Joseph Sansoni, the son of Louis Sansoni, the Colonial Postmaster General in 1824.

Government offices
Preceded by Joseph Jonville	Surveyor General of Ceylon; 1805–1811	Succeeded by Gualterus Schneider
