= Francis Coningsby Hannam Clarke =

British military officer

Lieutenant-Colonel Francis Coningsby Hannam Clarke CMG FRGS
- Born: 4 February 1842; Brussels, Belgium
- Died: 27 August 1893 (aged 51); Hove, Brighton, England
- Military career
- Allegiance: British Ceylon
- Branch: Ceylon Defence Force
- Rank: Lieutenant-Colonel
- Unit: Royal Artillery
- Commands: Commander of the Ceylon Volunteers

Lieutenant-Colonel Francis Coningsby Hannam Clarke CMG FRGS (4 February 1842 – 27 August 1893) was a British military officer and colonial administrator who served as the first Commander of the Ceylon Volunteers. He was appointed on 20 April 1888 until 27 August 1893. He succeeded William Wilby as General Officer Commanding, Ceylon. He was succeeded by Henry Byrde.

He was the ninth Surveyor General of Ceylon. He was appointed in 1883, succeeding A. B. Fyers, and held the office until 1893. He was succeeded by David G. Mantell.

Military offices
Preceded by William Wilby as General Officer Commanding, Ceylon	Commander of the Ceylon Volunteers; 1888-1893	Succeeded by Henry Byrde
Government offices
Preceded by A. B. Fyers	Surveyor General of Ceylon; 1883–	Succeeded by D. G. Mantell
