= Richard Durnford =

English bishop (1802–1895)

The Right Reverend Richard Durnford
- Bishop of Chichester
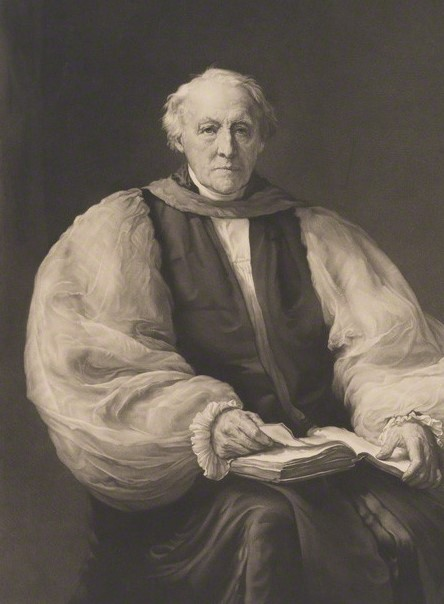
- Church: Church of England
- Diocese: Chichester
- Installed: 1870
- Term ended: 1895
- Predecessor: Ashurst Gilbert
- Successor: Ernest Wilberforce
- Other post: Archdeacon of Manchester

Personal details
- Born: 3 November 1802
- Died: 14 October 1895 (aged 92)
- Denomination: Anglican
- Residence: The Palace, Chichester
- Children: Richard Durnford Jr.; Sir Walter Durnford
- Education: Magdalen College, Oxford

Richard Durnford (3 November 1802 – 14 October 1895) was the Bishop of Chichester from 1870 to 1895.

== Biography ==
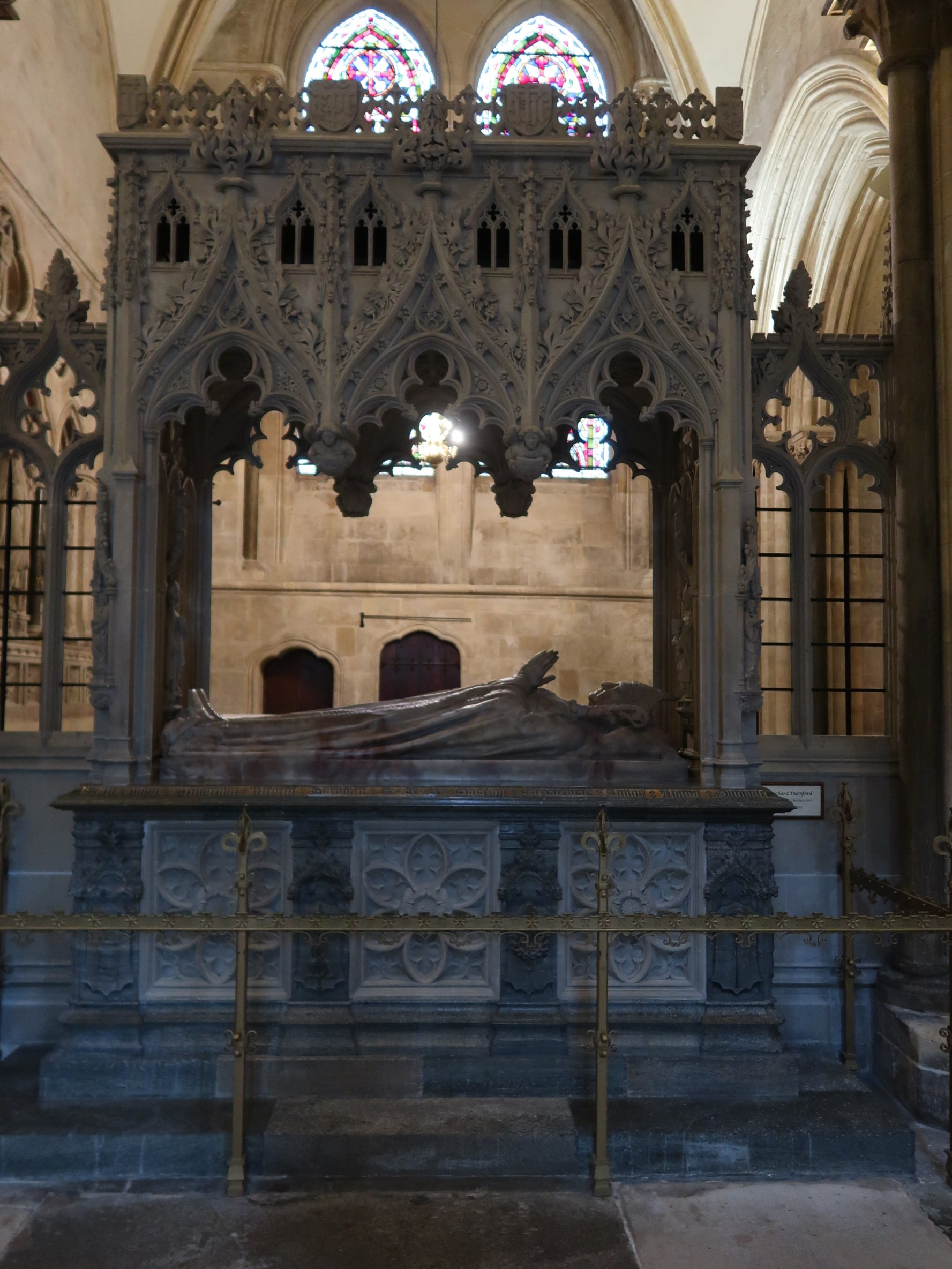
Memorial to Bishop Richard Durnford in Chichester Cathedral

He was born in Newbury, Berkshire, into an ecclesiastical family (his father was also named Richard Dunford). He was educated at Eton and Magdalen College, Oxford, and ordained in 1831.

Durnford took a position as tutor to Edward Vernon Harbord, for which he was recommended by Stephen Lushington. With a presentation from Edward Harbord, 3rd Baron Suffield, he was then from 1835 rector of Middleton, Lancashire. He became its rural dean.

In 1840 he married Emma, the daughter of his old Eton headmaster, John Keate. He had two sons, Richard Durnford Jr., former secretary of the Charity Commission, and Sir Walter Durnford.

In 1867 he became Archdeacon of Manchester and in the following year canon residentiary at Manchester Cathedral. In 1870 he was elevated to the episcopate of Chichester.

He died in Basel. His body was brought back to Chichester Cathedral for a funeral service, and then interred at Westhampnett.

Durnford House at Brighton College was named after him. The Durnford House at Eton is named after his brother, Francis Edward Durnford, who taught there from 1839 to 1877.

== Notes ==
Church of England titles
Preceded by Robert Manson	Archdeacon of Manchester; 1867–1870	Succeeded by George Anson
Preceded by Ashurst Gilbert	Bishop of Chichester; 1870–1895	Succeeded by Ernest Wilberforce
