= W. C. S. Ingles =

W. C. S. Ingles Major

14th Surveyor General of Ceylon
- In office 1915–1923
- Preceded by: R. S. Templeton
- Succeeded by: A. J. Wickwar

Personal details
- Born: 23 November 1868
- Died: 29 July 1953 (aged 84)

Major Walter Culpepper Stanser Ingles, VD, FRGS (23 November 1868 – 29 July 1953) was a British surveyor. He was the 14th Surveyor General of Ceylon and an official member of the Legislative Council of Ceylon.

Born in Colchester, Essex on 23 November 1868, he was educated at Victoria College, Jersey. Travelling to Ceylon, he joined the Ceylon Civil Service and was appointed Assistant Surveyor in January 1890. He was promoted District Surveyor in March 1897; Assistant and Superintendent in May 1897; Acting Superintendent of Trigometrical Survey in January 1902; Acting Assistant Surveyor-General, June 1908, and Surveyor-General of Ceylon in November 1915 succeeding R. S. Templeton, and held the office until 1923. He was succeeded by A. J. Wickwar. He was a Fellow of the Royal Geographical Society.

Having served in the ranks of the Ceylon Planters Rifle Corps, he was commissioned as a second lieutenant in the Ceylon Artillery Volunteers on 13 February 1909. Promoted to Lieutenant in February 1911 and Captain on the Reserve in September 1915 on his appointment as Surveyor-General. He was mobilized for war service and after the war returned to the active list having been appointed a Captain in October 1921, and became a Major on the reserve in September 1923. He was awarded the Colonial Auxiliary Forces Long Service Medal in 1921 and the Colonial Auxiliary Forces Officers' Decoration in 1925. Retiring to Yarmouth in the Isle of Wight, he died on 29 July 1953.

Government offices
Preceded by R. S. Templeton	Surveyor General of Ceylon; 1915–1923	Succeeded by A. J. Wickwar
