= J. L. T. E. Dassenaike =

Surveyor General of Sri Lanka

24th Surveyor General of Sri Lanka
- In office 1961–1961
- Preceded by: V. Rasaretnam
- Succeeded by: S. Karthigesu

J. L. T. E. Dassenaike was the 24th Surveyor General of Sri Lanka. He was appointed in 1961, succeeding V. Rasaretnam, and held the office until 1961. He was succeeded by S. Karthigesu.

Government offices
Preceded by V. Rasaretnam	Surveyor General of Sri Lanka; 1961	Succeeded by S. Karthigesu
