= Gualterus Schneider =

3rd Surveyor General of Ceylon
- In office 1811–1833
- Preceded by: George Atkinson
- Succeeded by: F. B. Norris

Personal details
- Born: 23 November 1772 Jaffna, Dutch Ceylon
- Died: 10 September 1841 (aged 68) Colombo, British Ceylon
- Spouse(s): Sophia Magdalena Statts (m. 1797; died 1830) Elizabeth Gatherina Stewart Titterton (m. 1831)
- Relations: Gualterus Stewart Schneider (grandson)
- Children: Johanna Gertruida; Marie Henrietta; Gualterus Fredrik

Captain Gualterus Schneider (23 November 1772 – 10 September 1841) was a Dutch colonial administrator who the third Surveyor General of Ceylon. He was appointed in 1811, succeeding George Atkinson, and held the office until 1833. He was succeeded by F. B. Norris.

Gualterus Schneider was born on 23 November 1772, in Jaffna, Ceylon, the son of Lieutenant Johann Hendrich Schneider (1753–?) and Christina Elizabeth (née Schoorman, 1749–1779). Schneider was 23 and employed in the engineering service of the Dutch East India Company as a landmeter (land surveyor), when the maritime provinces of Ceylon were ceded to the British. He accepted service under the British Government as civil engineer and was placed in charge of the Royal Engineers and the Ceylon Pioneer Lascars, a labour corps officered by Europeans, which was engaged in the construction of roads and bridges. He was appointed as a 2nd Lieutenant in the 3rd Ceylon Rifles in 1806 and promoted to captain in 1808.

When the Survey Department was formed in August 1800, Schneider was appointed principal surveyor of Colombo. He acted as Surveyor-General for a brief period when Atkinson left the colony on leave in preparation for his retirement. Schneider continued in an acting capacity following Atkinson's retirement for seven years before his appointment was made permanent 1818. In 1832, following extensive reforms to the Engineer and Surveyor's Department, he was pensioned off on 18 March 1833.

He was an ardent Freemason and held the high rank of 32°, and Grand Inspector.

Schneider married twice, first to Sophia Statts (1780-1830) on 5 February 1797, and five months after her death, on 19 May 1831, to Elizabeth Katherina Stewart Titterton (1813-1839), daughter of James Titterton, apothecary of the colonial armed forces. He had two daughters, Johana Gertruida (1797-1822) and Maria Henrietta (1805-1834) by his first marriage and a son, Gualterus Fredrik (1833-1871), by the second. Schneider died on 10 September 1841 in Colombo and was buried at Wolvendaal Church. His grandson Sir Gualterus Stewart Schneider served as the 7th Solicitor General of Ceylon (1917).

Government offices
Preceded by George Atkinson	Surveyor General of Ceylon; 1811–1833	Succeeded by F. B. Norris
