= Philip David Warren =

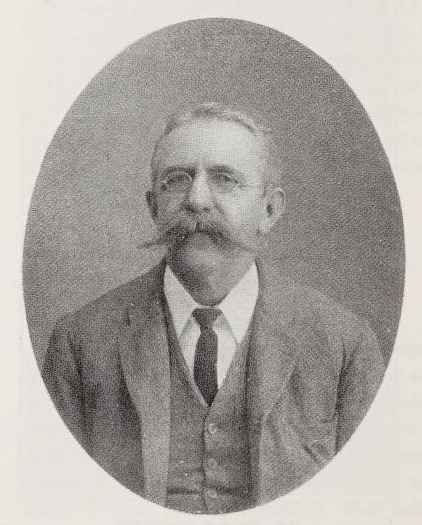

12th Surveyor General of Ceylon
- In office 1904–1910
- Preceded by: F. H. Grinlinton
- Succeeded by: R. S. Templeton

Philip David Warren (07 Feb 1851 - 28 Jan 1928) CMG was the 12th Surveyor General of Ceylon.

Warren was educated at Norwich Grammar School. He was appointed in 1904, succeeding F. H. Grinlinton, and held the office until 1910. He was appointed CMG in the 1908 Birthday Honours and succeeded by R. S. Templeton.

Government offices
Preceded by F. H. Grinlinton	Surveyor General of Ceylon; 1904–1910	Succeeded by R. S. Templeton
