= R. J. Johnston =

19th Surveyor General of Ceylon

19th Surveyor General of Ceylon
- In office 1943–1946
- Preceded by: L. G. O. Woodhouse
- Succeeded by: I. F. Wilson

R. J. Johnston was the 19th Surveyor General of Ceylon. He was appointed in 1943, succeeding L. G. O. Woodhouse, and held the office until 1946. He was succeeded by I. F. Wilson.

Government offices
Preceded by L. G. O. Woodhouse	Surveyor General of Ceylon; 1943–1946	Succeeded by I. F. Wilson
