= A. M. Cumaraswamy =

32nd Surveyor General of Sri Lanka
- In office 1973–1973
- Preceded by: R. A. Gunawardana
- Succeeded by: S. J. Munasinghe

A. M. Cumaraswamy was the 32nd Surveyor General of Sri Lanka. He was appointed in 1973, succeeding R. A. Gunawardana, and held the office until 1973. He was succeeded by S. J. Munasinghe.

Government offices
Preceded by R. A. Gunawardana	Surveyor General of Sri Lanka; 1973	Succeeded by S. J. Munasinghe
