= S. D. F. C. Nanayakkara =

34th Surveyor General of Sri Lanka
- In office 1981–1989
- Preceded by: S. J. Munasinghe
- Succeeded by: S. T. Herat

S. D. F. C. Nanayakkara was the 34th Surveyor General of Sri Lanka. He was appointed in 1981, succeeding S. J. Munasinghe, and held the office until 1989. He was succeeded by S. T. Herat.

Government offices
Preceded by S. J. Munasinghe	Surveyor General of Sri Lanka; 1981–1989	Succeeded by S. T. Herat
