= S. T. Herat =

35th Surveyor General of Sri Lanka
- In office 1989–1991
- Preceded by: S. D. F. C. Nanayakkara
- Succeeded by: E. M. Perera

Personal details
- Born: 28 October 1934 Kandy, Ceylon
- Died: 25 October 2019 (aged 84)

Samson Theodore Herat (28 October 1934 – 25 October 2019) was the 35th Surveyor General of Sri Lanka. He was appointed in 1989, succeeding S. D. F. C. Nanayakkara, and held the office until 1991. He was succeeded by E. M. Perera.

Government offices
Preceded by S. D. F. C. Nanayakkara	Surveyor General of Sri Lanka; 1989–1991	Succeeded by E. M. Perera
