= G. K. Thornhill =

17th Surveyor General of Ceylon
- In office 1932–1937
- Preceded by: A. H. G. Dawson
- Succeeded by: L. G. O. Woodhouse

Personal details
- Born: George Kraal Thornhill; 3 March 1884
- Died: 29 January 1960 (aged 75) Surrey, England

George Kraal Thornhill (3 March 1884 – 29 January 1960) was a British engineer who was the 17th Surveyor General of Ceylon. He was appointed in 1932, succeeding A. H. G. Dawson, and held the office until 1937. He was succeeded by L. G. O. Woodhouse.

Government offices
Preceded by A. H. G. Dawson	Surveyor General of Ceylon; 1932–1937	Succeeded by L. G. O. Woodhouse
