= Edward Jayakody =

- එඩ්වඩ් ජයකොඩි
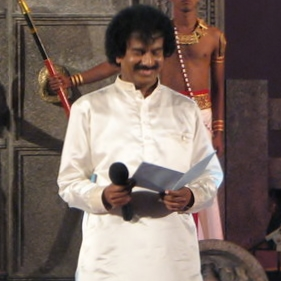
- Jayakody in 2006
- Born: Jayakody Arachchige Don Edward Timothy Jayakody; 6 April 1952 (age 74); Kegalle, Sri Lanka
- Education: Bandaranaike Junior School; St. Mary's College, Kegalle; Nugawela Central College
- Occupations: Musician, composer, singer, teacher
- Spouse: Charitha Priyadarshani (m. 1991)
- Children: 2
- Parents: Don Raphial Jayakody (father); Victoria Jayakody (mother)
- Musical career
- Genres: Pop; soul; rhythm and blues; Indian classical music
- Instrument: Vocals
- Years active: 1977–present
- Labels: Nilwala; MEntertainment; Ransilu

Jayakody Arachchige Don Edward Timothy Jayakody (Sinhala: එඩ්වඩ් ජයකොඩි; born 6 April 1952), popularly known as Edward Jayakody, is a Sri Lankan musician, singer, composer, and occasional actor. He has directed the music for hundreds of Sinhala films and television serials and has also composed many songs for children's programming ("Koppara Koppara").

Jayakody won the Swarna Sanka Award in 1987 for Best Male Singer for the film Gedara Budun Amma. He won the award for Best Music Director in 1979 and 1980 for the plays Nidane and Aparadaya Saha Danduwama.

== Early life and education ==
Jayakody was born on 6 April 1952 in Hettimulla, Kegalle, Sri Lanka, the youngest of six children of Don Raphial Jayakody and Victoria Jayakody (d. 2017). While receiving his early education at Bandaranaike Junior School, he joined the church choir. He received his secondary education at St. Mary's College in Kegalle and learned music under teacher H. Samarapala.

== Music career ==
During the period from 1968 to 1976, Jayakody participated in the "Maliban Guwan Thotilla" and many amateur music programs. He entered the Government College of Music in 1976 (presently the Faculty of Aesthetic Education of Kelaniya University) and during that time took part in music programs conducted by popular musicians. In 1976, he sang on the popular radio program "Pibidena Gayaka Parapura" on the radio, and he won second place in the grand finale of the program. He entered singing with the song Karadiya Gambare for a 1977 radio musical program. Its lyrics are by Premakumara Jayawardena and the music was composed by Rohana Weerasinghe.

During the 1980s, he released two cassettes and a CD, Seethala Pinimatha, Kerakena Rode and Samanalaya Mala Ha Lamaya. He also holds a government position as Educational Assistant Music Director. Jayakody made several children's songs such as Kopara Kopara, Katu Akule, Rajjuruwo Udai, Sulangak Vee and Chakgudu Gudu. At the same time, he was appointed as the Music Teacher at Nalanda College, where he worked for a while and then transferred to Gurukula College, Kelaniya. In 1986, Jayakody was promoted to Staff Education Officer in the Music Division and attached to the Ministry of Education. Around the same time, he unveiled his second album Kerakena Rode. He received his Master's degree in 1992 from the Bhatkhande Music Institute Deemed University, Lucknow.

Apart from singing, he composed and worked as the music director for more than fifty-two singers. He also composed music for a number of stage plays and teledramas. He has performed as an actor in seventeen stage plays including maiden acting in 1975 stage play Spartacus and then in Kontha Nona, Angara Ganga Galabhasi, Mawatha Api, Sekkuwa, Nari Bena, Gajaman Puwatha, Oedipus and Satara Waram Raja Daruwo. In 2010, Jayakody and Charitha organized a musical tour titled Wasanthaye Aga to Europe from October 16. In 2019, Sabaragamuwa University of Sri Lanka conferred a lifetime achievement award for Jayakody for his contribution to the Sri Lankan music industry.

He has contributed playback singing to several films, including Seilama, Gedara Buddha Amma, Mangala Thagga, Himagira, Saroja and Kiri Kawadi. He made maiden cinema appearance in the musical film Guththila with the titular role. Jayakody's album Deduna Palama was released on April 6, 2003.

Jayakody has performed his solo musical concert titled Marambari since January 2010. So far, 13 Marambari concerts have been held in Italy alone. The series was a huge success in Canada, London, France, Australia, New Zealand, Dubai and the United States. In November 2017, Marambari concert was held at Apeksha Hospital, Maharagama. The tenth anniversary of Jayakody's Marambari solo concert was held on the evening of the 31 January 2020 at the Bandaranaike Memorial Conference Hall, Colombo.

Apart from singing, Jayakody made his maiden cinematic acting through the film Guththila where he played the titular role.

== Personal life ==
Jayakody is married to popular singer Charitha Priyadarshani. They married on 17 January 1991. The couple has one son, Chandeepa and one daughter, Sharanya Rasodi. Chandeepa was engaged to Deshaki de Silva. To celebrate their 25th wedding anniversary, Jayakody and Charitha remarried on the same date.
