= Sanghadasa Berugoda =

38th Surveyor General of Sri Lanka
- In office 1992–1993
- Preceded by: Thamotharam Somasekaram
- Succeeded by: N. C. Seneviratne

Personal details
- Born: c. 1934
- Died: 2007 Adelaide, Australia

Sanghadasa Berugoda (c. 1934 – 2007) was the 38th Surveyor General of Sri Lanka. He was appointed in 1992, succeeding Thamotharam Somasekaram, and held the office until 1993. He was succeeded by N. C. Seneviratne.

Berugoda died in Adelaide, Australia in 2007 at the age of 73.

Government offices
Preceded by Thamotharam Somasekaram	Surveyor General of Sri Lanka; 1992–1993	Succeeded by N. C. Seneviratne
