= I. F. Wilson =

20th Surveyor General of Sri Lanka
- In office 1946–1951
- Preceded by: R. J. Johnston
- Succeeded by: C. B. King

Personal details
- Born: Ian Froome Mack; 1896 St Denys, Southampton, Hampshire
- Died: 16 May 1963 (aged 66–67) Ramsey, Isle of Man

Ian Froome Wilson CBE MC (born Mack; 1896 – 16 May 1963) was an English surveyor who was the 20th Surveyor General of Ceylon. He was appointed in 1946, succeeding R. J. Johnston, and held the office until 1951. He was succeeded by G. B. King.

Government offices
Preceded by R. J. Johnston	Surveyor General of Ceylon; 1946–1951	Succeeded by G. B. King
