= M. P. Salgado =

40th Surveyor General of Sri Lanka (1936–2015)

40th Surveyor General of Sri Lanka
- In office 1996–1996
- Preceded by: N. C. Seneviratne
- Succeeded by: K. L. A. Ranasinghe Silva

Personal details
- Born: 1936 Koralawella, Moratuwa, Ceylon
- Died: 30 December 2015

M. P. Salgado (1936 – 30 December 2015) was the 40th Surveyor General of Sri Lanka. He was appointed in 1996, succeeding N. C. Seneviratne, and held the office until 1996. He was succeeded by K. L. A. Ranasinghe Silva.

Salgado was born in Koralawella in 1936. He died on 30 December 2015.

Government offices
Preceded by N. C. Seneviratne	Surveyor General of Sri Lanka; 1996	Succeeded by K. L. A. Ranasinghe Silva
