= S. J. Munasinghe =

33rd Surveyor General of Sri Lanka
- In office 1973–1981
- Preceded by: A. M. Cumaraswamy
- Succeeded by: S. D. F. C. Nanayakkara

S. J. Munasinghe was the 33rd Surveyor General of Sri Lanka. He was appointed in 1973, succeeding A. M. Cumaraswamy, and held the office until 1981. He was succeeded by S. D. F. C. Nanayakkara.

Government offices
Preceded by A. M. Cumaraswamy	Surveyor General of Sri Lanka; 1973–1981	Succeeded by S. D. F. C. Nanayakkara
