= Charles Sims (Surveyor General) =

7th Surveyor General of Ceylon
- In office 1858–1865
- Preceded by: W. D. Gosset
- Succeeded by: A. B. Fyers

Charles Sims was the seventh Surveyor General of Ceylon. He was appointed in 1858, succeeding W. D. Gosset, and held the office until 1865. He was succeeded by A. B. Fyers.

Government offices
Preceded by W. D. Gosset	Surveyor General of Ceylon; 1858–1865	Succeeded by A. B. Fyers
