= V. Rasaretnam =

23rd Surveyor General of Sri Lanka
- In office 1958–1961
- Preceded by: N. S. Perera
- Succeeded by: J. L. T. E. Dassenaike

V. Rasaretnam was the 23rd Surveyor General of Sri Lanka. He was appointed in 1958, succeeding N. S. Perera, and held the office until 1961. He was succeeded by J. L. T. E. Dassenaike.

Government offices
Preceded by N. S. Perera	Surveyor General of Sri Lanka; 1958–1961	Succeeded by J. L. T. E. Dassenaike
