= Robert Stanser Templeton =

Surveyor General of Ceylon (1855–1930)

R. S. Templeton
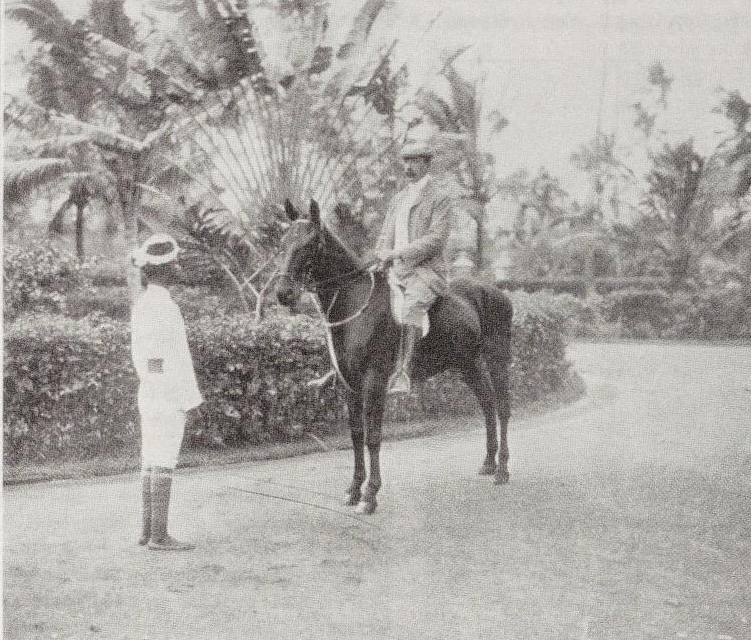

13th Surveyor General of Ceylon
- In office 1910–1915
- Preceded by: Philip David Warren
- Succeeded by: W. C. S. Ingles

Personal details
- Born: Robert Stanser Templeton; 2 December 1855 Belfast, Ireland
- Died: 5 November 1930 (aged 75) Isle of Wight, Hampshire, England

Robert Stanser Templeton (2 December 1855 – 5 November 1930) was an Anglo-Irish civil engineer and the 13th Surveyor General of Ceylon. He was appointed in 1910, succeeding Philip David Warren, and held the office until 1915. He was succeeded by W. C. S. Ingles.

He was the son of naturalist Robert Templeton and grandson of botanist John Templeton.

Government offices
Preceded by Philip David Warren	Surveyor General of Ceylon; 1910–1915	Succeeded by W. C. S. Ingles
