= A. J. Wickwar =

15th Surveyor General of Ceylon
- In office 1923–1927
- Preceded by: W. C. S. Ingles
- Succeeded by: A. H. G. Dawson

Personal details
- Born: Arthur Joseph Wickwar; 1871
- Died: Unknown

Arthur Joseph Wickwar (1871–?) was the 15th Surveyor General of Ceylon. He was appointed in 1923, succeeding W. C. S. Ingles, and held the office until 1927. He was succeeded by A. H. G. Dawson.

Wickwar was educated at St Cuthbert's Grammar School in Newcastle upon Tyne.

Government offices
Preceded by W. C. S. Ingles	Surveyor General of Ceylon; 1923–1927	Succeeded by A. H. G. Dawson
