= G. B. King =

21st Surveyor General of Ceylon
- In office 1951–1954
- Preceded by: I. F. Wilson
- Succeeded by: N. S. Perera

G. B. King was the 21st Surveyor General of Ceylon. He was appointed in 1951, succeeding I. F. Wilson, and held the office until 1954. He was succeeded by N. S. Perera.

Government offices
Preceded by I. F. Wilson	Surveyor General of Ceylon; 1951–1954	Succeeded by N. S. Perera
