= Charitha Priyadarshani =

Sri Lankan singer

- චරිතා ප්‍රියදර්ශනී
- Born: Charitha Priyadarshani Peiris; 19 October 1967 (age 58); Nugegoda, Sri Lanka
- Education: Anula Vidyalaya
- Occupations: Singer, playback singer, announcer, teacher
- Spouse: Edward Jayakody (m. 1991)
- Children: 2
- Parents: Ariyadasa Peiris (father); Pushpa Wijeratne (mother)
- Relatives: Ranjith Peiris (uncle); Jayantha Peiris (uncle); Chathurika Peiris (cousin sister); Gayan Wickramathilake (cousin brother-in-law); Purnika Peiris (cousin sister); Peshala Manoj (cousin brother-in-law)
- Musical career
- Genres: Pop; soul; rhythm and blues; Indian classical music
- Instrument: Vocals
- Years active: 1985–present
- Labels: Nilwala; Ransilu

Visharadha Charitha Priyadarshani Peiris (Sinhala: චරිතා ප්‍රියදර්ශනී පීරිස්: born 19 October 1967), is a Sri Lankan singer and announcer.

== Personal life ==
Priyadarshani was born on 19 October 1967 in Mirihana, Nugegoda. She has one older sister, Malika. Her father, Ariyadasa Peiris, was a popular radio artist and filmmaker. Her mother, Pushpa Wijeratne, was a housewife who died in 2001 after a brief illness.

Priyadarshani completed her education at Anula Vidyalaya, Nugegoda. She sang in every school ceremony along with her classmate Deepika Priyadarshani. At the school, Charitha studied Kandyan dancing under Daya Nellampitiya and Christine Dissanayake. She was an active member of the school's Eastern band and took part in guiding and netball.

Charitha is married to singer Edward Jayakody. Edward first met Charitha during his music classes under H. Samarapala who was married to Charitha's aunt. The wedding was celebrated on 17 January 1991 when Charitha was at the age of 22. Edward was born on April 6, 1952, to Victoria and Don Rafial Jayakody. He studied at Bandaranaike Central College, Nugawela Central College and St. Mary's College, Kegalle. The couple has one son, Chandeepa and one daughter, Sharanya Rasodi. Chandeepa got engaged to Deshaki de Silva. To celebrate 25th wedding anniversary, Jayakody and Charitha remarried on the same date.

Since 1994, Edward and Charitha have worked together as artists in the United People's Freedom Alliance political campaigns.

== Family background ==
Her father, Ariyadasa Peiris, was the first announcer to present a program at Sri Lanka Broadcasting Corporation (SLBC) in 1951. He later presented the radio programs "Adunika Peya", "Maliban Guwan Thotilla", "Pibidena Gayaka Parapura", "Pena Podi", "Suhada Pathum", "Ouw-Na-Ba", " Puluwannam Dinaganna", "Vinadiyak Pamanai" and "Ambiga Geethayen Geethaya". He directed the films Sobana Sitha and Deva Sundari and also took part in Kurulu Bedda. His two brothers, Ranjith Peiris and Jayantha Peiris are also radio artists. Ariyadasa Peiris died in February 2017 at the age of 91.

Jayantha Peiris is also a teledrama producer. Jayantha has two daughters, Chathurika Peiris and Purnika Peiris. Chathurika is a popular actress in cinema and television. Chathurika initially dated actor Roshan Pilapitiya for a long time, when they separated in 2014. In 2014, she married fellow actor Gayan Wickramathilake. Purnika Pieris is also a teledrama actress and television host working in TV Derana. Poornika was married to Sahan Abeysekera, who is also a television host. Sahan and Purnika have one son, Adithya. The couple separated in 2017. In 2019, Purnika married musician and fellow television host Peshala Manoj.

Ranjith Peiris has two daughters, Niranjala Basnayake and Chamali Vathsala worked at Sri Lanka Rupavahini Corporation, Sri FM and Lakhanda Radio respectively.

== Career ==
While still a student, Charitha wanted to be an announcer. In 1984, she was involved with programs at the SLBC under the guidance of her father's younger brother, Jayantha Peiris. After completing A/Ls, she joined SLBC full-time and performed her first radio program "Sonduru Sevena" in 1985. In 1994, she became a relief announcer and later became a news reader in 1995. She also worked as a drama artiste for few years as well.

Meanwhile, Charitha studied music under her future husband Edward and then under the late Victor B. Perera. She passed the SLBC test as a 'Grade A' singer. In 1987, she conducted the lottery program 'Shanida Vaasanava' for the Development Lotteries Board. She continued to work as an announcer for 'Shanida Vaasanava' for 33 consecutive years. At the same year, she joined ITN and presented the weekly news program 'Kala Rasanga' along with Francis Wanniarachchi. Later, she presented the programs 'Mathakaye Randunu Gee' and 'Eda Api Dutu Chithrapatayakin'.

In 1998, Charitha made the melody for the song Dalmalamu Api Eka Iti Pahanak composed by Pushpa Ramlani and sung by more than 100 popular female singers in Sri Lanka. The song was composed for International Women's Day. She received the Commendation Award of the Year from the Faculty of Law, University of Colombo for the song. She completed 'Visharada' exam in 2008. On 16 November 2004, a felicitation ceremony was held at the John de Silva Memorial Theatre at 6.30 pm for her father Ariyadasa Peiris. On the same day, Charitha launched her CD and audio cassette.

She has performed in every solo concert titled Marambari performed by her husband Jayakody. So far, 13 Marambari concerts have been held in Italy alone. The series was a huge success in Canada, London, France, Australia, New Zealand, Dubai and the United States. In November 2017, Marambari concert was held at Apeksha Hospital, Maharagama. The tenth anniversary of Jayakody's Marambari solo concert was held on the evening of the 31 January 2020 at the Bandaranaike Memorial Conference Hall, Colombo where Charitha and two children also performed in the concert.

They are currently conduct music classes at "Sarisara Music Academy" by providing guidance for musical examinations in Sri Lanka and India, including GCE O/L, A/L, Bathkande exams and grades 6 to 9 local music syllabus for students. Besides, Charitha conducts 'Rasa Vindana' classes for music enthusiasts. In 2016, she recorded the song Sanda Eliya Dige with a music video.

On 16 February 2020, she was honored with the 'Siri Sugatha Kala Award' presented annually by the Siri Sugatha Arts Forum affiliated with the Siri Sugatha Dhammikashrama Temple, Hekitta, Wattala.
