= A. B. Fyers =

Amelius Beauclerk Fyers

8th Surveyor General of Ceylon
- In office 1866–1883
- Preceded by: Charles Sims
- Succeeded by: P. C. H. Clarke

Personal details
- Born: 12 July 1829; Jersey, England
- Died: 5 April 1883 (aged 53); Bath, Somerset, England
- Spouse(s): Anne Eliza Brownrigg; Adelaide Isabella Leith
- Children: eleven

Colonel Amelius Beauclerk Fyers (12 July 1829 – 5 April 1883) was the eighth Surveyor General of Ceylon. He was appointed in 1866, succeeding Charles Sims, and held the office until 1883. He was succeeded by P. C. H. Clarke.

Amelius Beauclerk Fyers was born at Jersey on 12 July 1829. He married Anne Eliza Brownrigg, daughter of Captain William Brownrigg, at Mauritius in 1850. They had ten children: Mary Anne Louisa (b. 1851); William Amelius Beauclerk (b. 1852), who was in the Ceylon Civil Service; Charles Cornwallis Meadows (b. 1854), who was also in the Ceylon Civil Service; Renee Sabine Fyers (b. 1855), who married Harry Charles Purvis Bell, the first Commissioner of Archaeology in Ceylon; Laura Isabella (b. 1857); Henry Francis Clifton (b. 1859), who was in the Ceylon Forest Department; Frances Henrietta (b. 1860); Robert Montague; Adelaide Hay (b. 1865); and Kate Minnie (b. 1867). He remarried Adelaide Isabella Leith, the youngest daughter of Colonel Forbes Leith, of Whitehaugh, Aberdeenshire, at Colombo, in December 1872. She died at Aberdeen in November, 1874. They had a daughter, Amelia Adelaide Wilhelmina Helen, (b. 1874). Fyers died in Bath on 5 April 1883.

Government offices
Preceded by Charles Sims	Surveyor General of Ceylon; 1866–1883	Succeeded by P. C. H. Clarke
