= K. Thavalingam =

Sri Lankan Tamil geographer

K. Thavalingam FSI
- Education: Jaffna Hindu College
- Occupation: Surveyor
- Title: Surveyor General of Sri Lanka
- Term: 2013 – 2014
- Predecessor: S. M. W. Fernando
- Successor: Nihal Gunawardena

Kanagaratnam Thavalingam is a Sri Lankan Tamil geographer and former Surveyor General of Sri Lanka.

Thavalingam is from Kaithady in northern Sri Lanka. He was educated at the Jaffna Hindu College. He is a fellow of the Surveyors Institute (of Sri Lanka) and a member of the institute's council.

Thavalingam was Senior Deputy Surveyor General and Additional Surveyor General. He became the 45th Surveyor General in 2013.
