= Galle Polling Division =

Galle
- Polling Division
- Coordinates: 6.048872°N 80.211834°E
- Country: Sri Lanka
- Province: Southern Province, Sri Lanka
- Electoral District: Galle Electoral District

Area
  - Total: 22.22 km^{2} (8.58 sq mi)

Population (2012)
  - Total: 101,749
  - Density: 4,579/km^{2} (11,860/sq mi)
- ISO 3166 code: EC-07H

The Galle Polling Division is a Polling Division in the Galle Electoral District, in the Southern Province, Sri Lanka.

== Presidential Election Results ==
=== Summary ===
The winner of Galle has matched the final country result 5 out of 8 times. Hence, Galle is a Weak Bellwether for Presidential Elections.

Year	Galle	Galle Electoral District	MAE %	Sri Lanka	MAE %
2019	NDF	SLPP	16.40%	SLPP	5.02%
2015	NDF	UPFA	18.88%	NDF	10.98%
2010	NDF	UPFA	15.83%	UPFA	10.28%
2005	UNP	UPFA	10.98%	UPFA	2.97%
1999	PA	PA	5.72%	PA	1.94%
1994	PA	PA	4.33%	PA	5.35%
1988	UNP	SLFP	6.47%	UNP	1.19%
1982	UNP	UNP	11.71%	UNP	8.68%
Matches/Mean MAE	5/8	6/8	11.29%	8/8	5.80%

=== 2019 Sri Lankan Presidential Election ===
Party	Galle		Galle Electoral District		Sri Lanka	
Party	Votes	%	Votes	%	Votes	%
NDF	31,248	46.89%	217,401	29.97%	5,564,239	41.99%
SLPP	31,108	46.68%	466,148	64.26%	6,924,255	52.25%
NMPP	3,044	4.57%	27,006	3.72%	418,553	3.16%
Other Parties (with < 1%)	1,238	1.86%	14,803	2.04%	345,452	2.61%
Valid Votes	66,638	99.00%	725,358	99.20%	13,252,499	98.99%
Rejected Votes	673	1.00%	5,878	0.80%	135,452	1.01%
Total Polled	67,311	83.49%	731,236	85.15%	13,387,951	83.71%
Registered Electors	80,618		858,749		15,992,568	

=== 2015 Sri Lankan Presidential Election ===
Party	Galle		Galle Electoral District		Sri Lanka	
Party	Votes	%	Votes	%	Votes	%
NDF	39,547	62.58%	293,994	43.37%	6,217,162	51.28%
UPFA	23,184	36.69%	377,126	55.64%	5,768,090	47.58%
Other Parties (with < 1%)	459	0.73%	6,691	0.99%	138,200	1.14%
Valid Votes	63,190	99.30%	677,811	99.05%	12,123,452	98.85%
Rejected Votes	447	0.70%	6,516	0.95%	140,925	1.15%
Total Polled	63,637	79.86%	684,327	80.46%	12,264,377	78.69%
Registered Electors	79,685		850,549		15,585,942	

=== 2010 Sri Lankan Presidential Election ===
Party	Galle		Galle Electoral District		Sri Lanka	
Party	Votes	%	Votes	%	Votes	%
NDF	27,625	51.12%	211,633	34.83%	4,173,185	40.15%
UPFA	25,797	47.74%	386,971	63.69%	6,015,934	57.88%
Other Parties (with < 1%)	616	1.14%	9,017	1.48%	204,494	1.97%
Valid Votes	54,038	99.43%	607,621	99.38%	10,393,613	99.03%
Rejected Votes	312	0.57%	3,765	0.62%	101,838	0.97%
Total Polled	54,350	75.93%	611,386	77.82%	10,495,451	66.70%
Registered Electors	71,575		785,663		15,734,587	

=== 2005 Sri Lankan Presidential Election ===
Party	Galle		Galle Electoral District		Sri Lanka	
Party	Votes	%	Votes	%	Votes	%
UNP	27,166	51.57%	239,320	40.26%	4,706,366	48.43%
UPFA	24,972	47.40%	347,233	58.41%	4,887,152	50.29%
Other Parties (with < 1%)	540	1.03%	7,915	1.33%	123,521	1.27%
Valid Votes	52,678	99.02%	594,468	99.08%	9,717,039	98.88%
Rejected Votes	520	0.98%	5,540	0.92%	109,869	1.12%
Total Polled	53,198	74.48%	600,008	79.86%	9,826,908	69.51%
Registered Electors	71,425		751,327		14,136,979	

=== 1999 Sri Lankan Presidential Election ===
Party	Galle		Galle Electoral District		Sri Lanka	
Party	Votes	%	Votes	%	Votes	%
PA	22,008	48.93%	281,154	54.91%	4,312,157	51.12%
UNP	20,042	44.56%	195,906	38.26%	3,602,748	42.71%
JVP	2,207	4.91%	27,257	5.32%	343,927	4.08%
Other Parties (with < 1%)	721	1.60%	7,702	1.50%	176,679	2.09%
Valid Votes	44,978	97.83%	512,019	98.14%	8,435,754	97.69%
Rejected Votes	1,000	2.17%	9,716	1.86%	199,536	2.31%
Total Polled	45,978	72.64%	521,735	77.43%	8,635,290	72.17%
Registered Electors	63,300		673,785		11,965,536	

=== 1994 Sri Lankan Presidential Election ===
Party	Galle		Galle Electoral District		Sri Lanka	
Party	Votes	%	Votes	%	Votes	%
PA	23,587	57.06%	285,398	61.40%	4,709,205	62.28%
UNP	17,258	41.75%	173,282	37.28%	2,715,283	35.91%
Other Parties (with < 1%)	493	1.19%	6,135	1.32%	137,040	1.81%
Valid Votes	41,338	98.53%	464,815	98.49%	7,561,526	98.03%
Rejected Votes	615	1.47%	7,112	1.51%	151,706	1.97%
Total Polled	41,953	67.65%	471,927	73.01%	7,713,232	69.12%
Registered Electors	62,011		646,373		11,158,880	

=== 1988 Sri Lankan Presidential Election ===
Party	Galle		Galle Electoral District		Sri Lanka	
Party	Votes	%	Votes	%	Votes	%
UNP	19,227	51.23%	124,912	44.62%	2,569,199	50.43%
SLFP	17,432	46.45%	148,615	53.09%	2,289,857	44.95%
SLMP	869	2.32%	6,417	2.29%	235,701	4.63%
Valid Votes	37,528	98.34%	279,944	98.43%	5,094,754	98.24%
Rejected Votes	633	1.66%	4,461	1.57%	91,499	1.76%
Total Polled	38,161	68.04%	284,405	49.34%	5,186,256	55.87%
Registered Electors	56,083		576,390		9,283,143	

=== 1982 Sri Lankan Presidential Election ===
Party	Galle		Galle Electoral District		Sri Lanka	
Party	Votes	%	Votes	%	Votes	%
UNP	23,785	62.57%	211,544	50.23%	3,450,815	52.93%
SLFP	11,508	30.27%	180,925	42.96%	2,546,348	39.05%
JVP	2,279	6.00%	20,962	4.98%	273,428	4.19%
Other Parties (with < 1%)	443	1.17%	7,707	1.83%	249,460	3.83%
Valid Votes	38,015	98.99%	421,138	98.78%	6,520,156	98.78%
Rejected Votes	389	1.01%	5,198	1.22%	80,470	1.22%
Total Polled	38,404	74.46%	426,336	81.84%	6,600,626	80.15%
Registered Electors	51,574		520,909		8,235,358	

== Parliamentary Election Results ==
=== Summary ===
The winner of Galle has matched the final country result 5 out of 7 times. Hence, Galle is a Weak Bellwether for Parliamentary Elections.

Year	Galle	Galle Electoral District	MAE %	Sri Lanka	MAE %
2015	UNP	UPFA	14.89%	UNP	9.42%
2010	UPFA	UPFA	13.78%	UPFA	8.71%
2004	UNP	UPFA	11.85%	UPFA	5.58%
2001	UNP	UNP	10.09%	UNP	6.82%
2000	UNP	PA	6.79%	PA	4.37%
1994	PA	PA	3.73%	PA	1.68%
1989	UNP	UNP	3.40%	UNP	3.22%
Matches/Mean MAE	5/7	6/7	9.22%	7/7	5.69%

=== 2015 Sri Lankan Parliamentary Election ===
Party	Galle		Galle Electoral District		Sri Lanka	
Party	Votes	%	Votes	%	Votes	%
UNP	33,798	57.61%	265,180	42.49%	5,098,916	45.77%
UPFA	19,613	33.43%	312,518	50.07%	4,732,664	42.48%
JVP	4,777	8.14%	37,778	6.05%	544,154	4.88%
Other Parties (with < 1%)	479	0.82%	8,659	1.39%	82,852	0.74%
Valid Votes	58,667	98.10%	624,135	97.63%	11,140,333	95.35%
Rejected Votes	1,133	1.89%	15,107	2.36%	516,926	4.42%
Total Polled	59,804	75.05%	639,318	78.00%	11,684,111	77.66%
Registered Electors	79,685		819,666		15,044,490	

=== 2010 Sri Lankan Parliamentary Election ===
Party	Galle		Galle Electoral District		Sri Lanka	
Party	Votes	%	Votes	%	Votes	%
UPFA	20,348	50.08%	305,307	66.17%	4,846,388	60.38%
UNP	14,804	36.44%	120,101	26.03%	2,357,057	29.37%
DNA	5,324	13.10%	33,663	7.30%	441,251	5.50%
Other Parties (with < 1%)	152	0.37%	2,317	0.50%	32,313	0.40%
Valid Votes	40,628	95.88%	461,388	95.05%	8,026,322	96.03%
Rejected Votes	1,744	4.12%	24,013	4.95%	581,465	6.96%
Total Polled	42,372	59.20%	485,401	61.67%	8,358,246	59.29%
Registered Electors	71,575		787,139		14,097,690	

=== 2004 Sri Lankan Parliamentary Election ===
Party	Galle		Galle Electoral District		Sri Lanka	
Party	Votes	%	Votes	%	Votes	%
UNP	23,585	48.25%	209,399	38.67%	3,486,792	37.73%
UPFA	20,779	42.51%	306,385	56.58%	4,223,126	45.70%
JHU	4,166	8.52%	22,826	4.22%	552,723	5.98%
Other Parties (with < 1%)	349	0.71%	2,901	0.54%	60,066	0.65%
Valid Votes	48,879	95.64%	541,511	94.69%	9,241,931	94.52%
Rejected Votes	2,227	4.36%	30,380	5.31%	534,452	5.47%
Total Polled	51,106	72.80%	571,891	79.81%	9,777,821	75.74%
Registered Electors	70,204		716,609		12,909,631	

=== 2001 Sri Lankan Parliamentary Election ===
Party	Galle		Galle Electoral District		Sri Lanka	
Party	Votes	%	Votes	%	Votes	%
UNP	27,516	55.80%	238,989	44.10%	4,086,026	45.62%
PA	15,640	31.71%	232,931	42.98%	3,330,815	37.19%
JVP	5,263	10.67%	61,806	11.41%	815,353	9.10%
Other Parties (with < 1%)	897	1.82%	8,188	1.51%	143,033	1.60%
Valid Votes	49,316	96.09%	541,914	95.66%	8,955,844	94.77%
Rejected Votes	2,006	3.91%	24,561	4.34%	494,009	5.23%
Total Polled	51,322	74.43%	566,475	81.09%	9,449,878	76.03%
Registered Electors	68,949		698,558		12,428,762	

=== 2000 Sri Lankan Parliamentary Election ===
Party	Galle		Galle Electoral District		Sri Lanka	
Party	Votes	%	Votes	%	Votes	%
UNP	22,351	47.15%	212,055	40.14%	3,451,765	40.12%
PA	20,004	42.20%	264,601	50.08%	3,899,329	45.33%
JVP	3,855	8.13%	41,620	7.88%	518,725	6.03%
SU	833	1.76%	4,535	0.86%	127,859	1.49%
Other Parties (with < 1%)	358	0.76%	5,537	1.05%	122,630	1.43%
Valid Votes	47,401	N/A	528,348	N/A	8,602,617	N/A

=== 1994 Sri Lankan Parliamentary Election ===
Party	Galle		Galle Electoral District		Sri Lanka	
Party	Votes	%	Votes	%	Votes	%
PA	23,347	52.07%	277,956	56.39%	3,887,805	48.94%
UNP	19,885	44.34%	203,268	41.24%	3,498,370	44.04%
MEP	983	2.19%	4,145	0.84%	68,538	0.86%
SLPF	612	1.36%	7,239	1.47%	90,078	1.13%
Other Parties (with < 1%)	15	0.03%	306	0.06%	813	0.01%
Valid Votes	44,842	96.93%	492,914	95.96%	7,943,688	95.20%
Rejected Votes	1,418	3.07%	20,763	4.04%	400,395	4.80%
Total Polled	46,260	74.60%	513,677	79.57%	8,344,095	74.75%
Registered Electors	62,011		645,559		11,163,064	

=== 1989 Sri Lankan Parliamentary Election ===
Party	Galle		Galle Electoral District		Sri Lanka	
Party	Votes	%	Votes	%	Votes	%
UNP	17,547	48.08%	183,962	50.40%	2,838,005	50.71%
SLFP	13,523	37.05%	152,096	41.67%	1,785,369	31.90%
SLMC	2,899	7.94%	4,014	1.10%	202,016	3.61%
ELJP	1,779	4.87%	4,097	1.12%	67,723	1.21%
USA	469	1.29%	18,160	4.98%	141,983	2.54%
Other Parties (with < 1%)	281	0.77%	2,676	0.73%	90,480	1.62%
Valid Votes	36,498	95.83%	365,005	93.94%	5,596,468	93.87%
Rejected Votes	1,587	4.17%	23,536	6.06%	365,563	6.13%
Total Polled	38,085	69.58%	388,541	68.03%	5,962,031	63.60%
Registered Electors	54,738		571,146		9,374,164	

== Demographics ==
=== Ethnicity ===
The Galle Polling Division has a Sinhalese majority (66.8%) and a significant Moor population (32.1%) . In comparison, the Galle Electoral District (which contains the Galle Polling Division) has a Sinhalese majority (94.4%)

Ethnicity in Galle
1. Sinhalese (66.8%)
2. Moor (32.1%)
3. Other (1.20%)

=== Religion ===
The Galle Polling Division has a Buddhist majority (65.7%) and a significant Muslim population (32.3%) . In comparison, the Galle Electoral District (which contains the Galle Polling Division) has a Buddhist majority (93.9%)

Religion in Galle
1. Buddhist (65.7%)
2. Muslim (32.3%)
3. Other (2.00%)
