= C. Vanniasingam (Surveyor General) =

30th Surveyor General of Sri Lanka
- In office 1970–1971
- Preceded by: C. T. Goonawardana
- Succeeded by: R. A. Gunawardana

C. Vanniasingam was the 30th Surveyor General of Sri Lanka. He was appointed in 1970, succeeding C. T. Goonawardana, and held the office until 1971. He was succeeded by R. A. Gunawardana.

Government offices
Preceded by C. T. Goonawardana	Surveyor General of Sri Lanka; 1970–1971	Succeeded by R. A. Gunawardana
