= Charitha Pattiaratchi =

Tamil academic

- Born: Charitha Bandula Pattiaratchi; 29 October 1957 (age 68); Colombo, Sri Lanka
- Citizenship: Australia
- Education: University College of Swansea (University of Wales)
- Spouse: Gabi Abels Pattiaratchi
- Children: Son : Nafyn Pattiaratchi; Daughter : Tesni Pattiaratchi
- Awards: Vice-chancellor's inaugural senior research award (2014); Ned Stark memorial award (2011); Eminent Sri Lankan scientist award (2001)
- Scientific career
- Fields: Coastal Oceanography
- Workplaces: University of Western Australia
- Website: https://research-repository.uwa.edu.au/en/persons/charitha-pattiaratchi

Charitha Pattiaratchi
Sport
- Sport: Swimming

Charitha Pattiaratchi (Sinhala: චරිත පට්ටිආරච්චි, Tamil: சரித பட்டிஆரச்சி) is a Winthrop Professor of coastal oceanography at the University of Western Australia. He leads the UWA Coastal Oceanography Group. and the IMOS Australian National Facility for Ocean Gliders. He has played an active role in research related to coastal ocean physical processes and their influence on climate, biological, and geological processes in estuaries, the nearshore (beach) zone, the continental shelf region and the deep ocean. This includes specifically climate change effects in regions of coastal Western Australia in terms of wind and wave climate, ocean currents, coastal flooding, sea level variability, and beach stability. The research programs he has developed involves ocean observation integration, numerical modelling and synthesis to define the role of physical processes in pathways of water and sediment (including morphological changes) weather and climate and ecosystem in the coastal ocean and the adjacent deep ocean.

== Education ==
Pattiaratchi obtained his secondary education at the prestigious Royal College Colombo. He received the Donhorst Memorial Prize for all-around student.

Pattiaratchi holds Bachelors, Masters and PhD degrees from the University College of Swansea, University of Wales, UK.

As the first and only Sri Lankan Professor of Oceanography globally, his contributions extend over 40 years, including the development of the Indian Ocean tsunami warning system.

Pattiaratchi was honored as an 'Eminent Sri Lankan Scientist' by the Ministry of Science and Technology in 2002. His publication records over 500 articles, including more than 220 in peer-reviewed international journals.

== Sporting career ==
=== Royal College years (1972–1976) ===
==== Swimming ====
As a swimmer, Pattiaratchi earned Colors from 1972 to 1976 and served as the Captain in 1975. His achievements included holding national records and championships in the 100m and 200m Freestyle, as well as the 200m and 400m Individual Medley. His Under 19 100m Free Style record lasted for 18 years.

==== Water Polo ====
Pattiaratchi earned Colors from 1972 to 1976. He captained the team in 1975, leading them to victory in the C league championship and securing the runner-up position in the National Championship in 1975.

==== Athletics ====
In athletics, Pattiaratchi participated in hurdles, high jump, discuss, and the 1500m. He was the Champion Athlete Under 16 and won numerous medals in various events, including the Gold in High Jump at the Under 15 National Championships in 1972.

=== Royal College Union Aquatic Club (1976) ===
Pattiaratchi continued his involvement in swimming by being appointed as the inaugural swimming captain in 1976.

=== Otter Aquatic Club (1974-1975) ===
In 1974, at the Otter Aquatic Club, Pattiaratchi's achievements were marked by the Gold Otter award for Best Performance of the Year, as well as recognition through the Laurel Wreath award for outstanding achievements.

=== Swansea University (1977-1983) ===
==== Swimming ====
As the captain of the Swansea University swimming team from 1977 to 1983, Pattiaratchi secured full colors in 1978-1979. His achievements include winning Gold in the short course Welsh and English (UAU) swimming championships for three consecutive years (1977-1979), representing Welsh and English combined Universities during the same period.

==== Water Polo ====
Pattiaratchi also captained the water polo team at Swansea University from 1977 to 1984, earning accolades such as the inaugural 'Club of the Year' award and winning the University of Wales Championship.

== Awards and honours ==
- Eminent Sri Lankan scientist award (2001)
- 2003 Excellence in Teaching Award: Postgraduate Supervision – UWA.
- 2005 Fellow, Institute of Marine Engineering, Science and Technology (IMarEST).
- Kevin Stark memorial award for excellence in coastal and ocean engineering (2011)
- Vice-chancellor's inaugural senior research award (2014)
- 2023 UWA Vice-chancellor's award for Research mentoring

== Selected bibliography ==
=== Articles ===
- Reisser, J.; Slat, B.; Noble, K.; du Plessis, K.; Epp, M.; Proietti, M.; de Sonneville, J.; Becker, T.; Pattiaratchi, C. (26 February 2015). "The vertical distribution of buoyant plastics at sea: an observational study in the North Atlantic Gyre". Biogeosciences. 12 (4): 1249–1256. Bibcode:2015BGeo...12.1249R. doi:10.5194/bg-12-1249-2015. hdl:20.500.11937/52558. ISSN 1726-4189.
- Reisser, Julia; Shaw, Jeremy; Hallegraeff, Gustaaf; Proietti, Maira; Barnes, David K. A.; Thums, Michele; Wilcox, Chris; Hardesty, Britta Denise; Pattiaratchi, Charitha; Ianora, Adrianna (18 June 2014). "Millimeter-Sized Marine Plastics: A New Pelagic Habitat for Microorganisms and Invertebrates". PLOS ONE. 9 (6) e100289. Bibcode:2014PLoSO...9j0289R. doi:10.1371/journal.pone.0100289. PMC 4062529. PMID 24941218.
- Reisser, Julia; Shaw, Jeremy; Wilcox, Chris; Hardesty, Britta Denise; Proietti, Maira; Thums, Michele; Pattiaratchi, Charitha; Hays, Graeme Clive (27 November 2013). "Marine Plastic Pollution in Waters around Australia: Characteristics, Concentrations, and Pathways". PLOS ONE. 8 (11) e80466. Bibcode:2013PLoSO...880466R. doi:10.1371/journal.pone.0080466. PMC 3842337. PMID 24312224.
- Masselink, G.; Pattiaratchi, C.B. (February 2001). "Seasonal changes in beach morphology along the sheltered coastline of Perth, Western Australia". Marine Geology. 172 (3–4): 243–263. Bibcode:2001MGeol.172..243M. doi:10.1016/S0025-3227(00)00128-6.
- Pearce, Alan; Pattiaratchi, Charitha (March 1999). "The Capes Current: a summer countercurrent flowing past Cape Leeuwin and Cape Naturaliste, Western Australia". Continental Shelf Research. 19 (3): 401–420. Bibcode:1999CSR....19..401P. doi:10.1016/S0278-4343(98)00089-2.

== Papers and publications ==
- https://uwa.academia.edu/CharithaPattiaratchi
- https://research-repository.uwa.edu.au/en/persons/charitha-pattiaratchi/publications/
- https://publons.com/researcher/2786539/charitha-b-pattiaratchi/
- https://loop.frontiersin.org/people/137781/publications
- https://www.scopus.com/authid/detail.uri?authorId=7003884923
- https://www.mendeley.com/profiles/charitha-pattiaratchi/publications/
