= W. E. Blewitt =

British artillery officer (1854–1939)

Major-General W. E. Blewitt CB CMG CBE
- Born: 24 September 1854; Pinner, Middlesex
- Died: 18 April 1939 (aged 84); Rickmansworth, Hertfordshire
- Military career
- Allegiance: United Kingdom
- Branch: British Army
- Service years: 1874–1916
- Rank: Major-General
- Commands: Portsmouth Garrison (1914–1916); Southern Coast Defences (1911–1914)
- Conflicts: Second Boer War; First World War
- Awards: Companion of the Order of the Bath; Companion of the Order of St Michael and St George; Commander of the Order of the British Empire; Mentioned in Despatches (2)

Major-General William Edward Blewitt, CB, CMG, CBE (24 September 1854 – 18 April 1939) was a British Army officer. Blewitt joined the Royal Artillery as a first lieutenant on 12 February 1874, was promoted to captain on 1 August 1883, and to major on 14 March 1891. He served during the Second Boer War, where he was Mentioned in Despatches twice, and was promoted to lieutenant-colonel on 13 February 1900. In 1901 he was a member of the Ordnance Committee. He commanded the Southern Coast Defences, 1911–1914; and the Portsmouth Garrison, 1914–1916 during the First World War.
