= Hartley Wespall =

Village and parish in Hampshire, England

Coordinates: 51°19′06″N 0°59′58″W

- Village and civil parish
- Location within Hampshire
- Population: 241 (2011 Census including Stratfield Turgis and Turgis Green)
- OS grid reference: SU6981958165
- District: Basingstoke and Deane
- Shire county: Hampshire
- Region: South East
- Country: England
- Sovereign state: United Kingdom
- Post town: HOOK
- Postcode district: RG27
- Dialling code: 01256
- Police: Hampshire and Isle of Wight
- Fire: Hampshire and Isle of Wight
- Ambulance: South Central
- UK Parliament: North East Hampshire

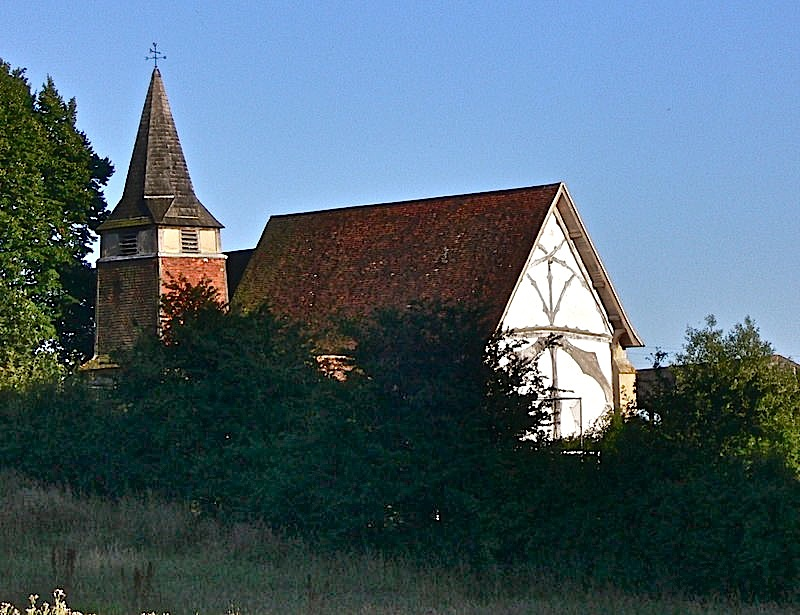
St Mary's church with exposed timber framing visible on the west wall

Hartley Wespall is a village and civil parish in the Basingstoke and Deane district of Hampshire, England. It is near the larger village of Hook, which lies approximately 2.5 miles (4.1 km) south-west from the hamlet.

St.Mary Church is flint with a Tile hung North Tower. It was essentially reconstructed by Gilbert Scott in 1868–69. It still has, as noted by Pevsner “one tremendous original feature, the early C14 timbers of the West Wall.” The fourteenth century church is Grade I listed.

John Keate, headmaster of Eton College from 1809 to 1834, was made rector here in 1824. He is buried in the church.
