= William Driscoll Gosset =

British Royal Engineer

Major-General William Driscoll Gosset FRSE

6th Surveyor General of Ceylon
- In office 1855–1858
- Preceded by: W. H. Simms
- Succeeded by: Charles Sims

Personal details
- Born: 13 April 1822 Charleville, Ireland
- Died: 19 May 1899 (aged 77) Kensington, London, England
- Profession: Royal Engineer

Military service
- Allegiance: United Kingdom
- Branch/service: Royal Engineers
- Rank: Major-General

Major-General William Driscoll Gosset FRSE (also Gossett; 13 April 1822 – 19 May 1899) was a British Royal Engineers officer who was one of seven officers of the elite Royal Engineers, Columbia Detachment, that founded British Columbia as the Colony of British Columbia (1858–1866); and who served as 6th Surveyor General of Ceylon.

== Early life ==
He was born in Charleville, County Cork, into a prominent Anglo-Irish family of Huguenot descent, the second son of Major John Noah Gossett (1793–1870) of the Rifle Brigade and his wife, Maria Margaret Driscoll (1796-1883).

He was commissioned as a lieutenant in the Royal Engineers in 1840 and was involved in survey work in Britain 1840 to 1850. He was promoted to captain in November 1850.

He was for his mapping work elected a Fellow of the Royal Society of Edinburgh in 1850, subsequent to his proposal by Charles Piazzi Smyth.

== Ceylon ==
In September 1855 Gossett was appointed 6th Surveyor General of Ceylon, succeeding W. H. Simms, as which he served until 1858. He was succeeded by Charles Sims. He was active in recruiting and interviewing assistants in London, but failed to spot embezzlement by the survey's head clerk.

== British Columbia ==
Gosset was appointed to the Royal Engineers, Columbia Detachment, as Colonial Treasurer, in November 1858, and arrived in Esquimalt on Christmas Day 1858.

He altercated with Colonel Richard Clement Moody's rival James Douglas, Governor of Vancouver Island, from 1860, and uncovered bookkeeping issues, and recommended the dismissal of Alexander Caulfield Anderson.

He served as Colonial Treasurer and Postmaster of British Columbia until 1860, when he became treasurer of Vancouver Island.

In 1861, during a shortage of coin in the colony, Douglas sent Gosset, and the assayer Francis George Claudet, to San Francisco, to obtain equipment to start a mint in New Westminster, which Gosset subsequently operated during 1862. Gosset was replaced as Treasurer in 1862.

== After British Columbia ==
Gosset returned to England on sick leave in 1862 and resigned from the Royal Engineers in 1863. He was appointed to a Science and Art Department in London during 1873. He retired in 1894.

He died on 19 May 1899 at 70 Edith Road in West Kensington in London.

== Family ==
In 1852, Gosset at Eton, Berkshire, married his cousin, Helena Dorothea Gosset (b. 1830), who was the daughter of Isaac Gosset (1782 – 1855) and the granddaughter of James Lind of Windsor. They had one son Ernest A. Gossett.

Government offices
Preceded by H. Chims	Surveyor General of Ceylon; 1855–1858	Succeeded by Charles Sims
