= Francis Brooke Norris =

British colonial administrator

Francis Norris

4th Surveyor General of Ceylon
- In office 1833–1846
- Preceded by: Gualterus Schneider
- Succeeded by: H. Chims

Personal details
- Born: Francis Brooke Norris; 1801 Ireland
- Died: 4 January 1879 (aged 78) Holland Park, London

Francis Brooke Norris (1801 – 4 January 1879) was a British colonial administrator who was the fourth Surveyor General of Ceylon. He was appointed in 1833, succeeding Gualterus Schneider, and held the office until 1846. He was succeeded by W. H. Simms.

He married Isabella Gillio in 1829 in Bombay. She died in 1837, aged 27. In 1839, he married secondly to Elizabeth Jane Cooper, daughter of Jonathon Sisson Cooper, Comptroller-General of Stamp Department of Ireland.

Government offices
Preceded by Gualterus Schneider	Surveyor General of Ceylon; 1833–1846	Succeeded by W. H. Simms
