= Jahangirabad =

- Town
- Location in Uttar Pradesh, India
- Coordinates: 28.25°N 78.06°E
- Country: India
- State: Uttar Pradesh
- District: Bulandshahr
- Founder: Unknown
- Elevation: 68 m (223 ft)

Population (2011)
  - Total: 59,858

Languages
  - Official: Hindi
- Time zone: UTC+5:30 (IST)
- PIN: 203394
- Vehicle registration: UP-13

Jahangirabad is a town in Bulandshahr district in the Indian state of Uttar Pradesh. The town is named after mughal emperor Jahangir, who is said to have stayed here for a couple of days. It has various holy places like Binner Devi, Dhaka Devi, Peetambra Devi. People celebrate festivals like Holi, Radha janamshtmi, Krishna Janmashtmi etc. There is a beautiful Jahangirabad Fort built right in the center of the town. The biggest school is also there at the outskirts of the town named " St. Joseph's Sr. Sec. School".

== History ==
Jahangirabad was founded at the same time as Anupshahr. It has two government schools and a government hospital. Most people of Jahangirabad are engaged in their business as it has a huge 2 km long market. The nearby college to Jahangirabad is RDPD GIRLS PG College and RDPD Institute of higher education. Jahangirabad has the second largest naveen mandi of rice and wheat of Uttar Pradesh. Jahangirabad comes under Anoopshahr legislative constituency.

== Geography ==
Jahangirabad is located on Bulandshahr - Anoopshahr Road. It is 100 km far from IGI, Delhi. Coordinate location is at 28.25°N 78.06°E.

== Demographics ==
As of 2011 India census, Jahangirabad had a population of between 100,000 and 500,000. Males constitute 53% of the population and females 47%. Jahangirabad has an average literacy rate of 51%, lower than the national average of 74.04 (2011): male literacy is 61%, and female literacy is 39%.
