= Harcourt Mortimer Bengough =

British Army general (1837–1922)

Major-General Sir Harcourt Mortimer Bengough KCB
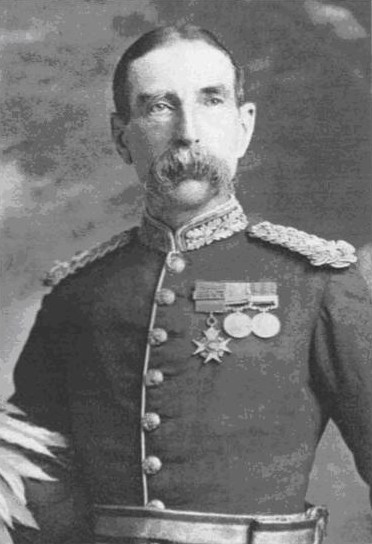
- Born: 25 November 1837
- Died: 20 March 1922 (aged 84)
- Military career
- Allegiance: United Kingdom
- Branch: British Army
- Service years: 1855–1899
- Rank: Major-General
- Unit: 77th Regiment of Foot
- Commands: 1st Infantry Brigade of the Aldershot Division
- Conflicts: Crimean War; Anglo-Zulu War; Third Anglo-Burmese War
- Awards: Knight Commander of the Order of the Bath; Companion of the Order of the Bath; Mentioned in Despatches (2)

Major-General Sir Harcourt Mortimer Bengough KCB (25 November 1837 – 20 March 1922) joined the British Army in 1855, and retired in 1899, after more than forty years of distinguished service from the Crimea to all quarters of the Empire.

== Early life and career ==
Bengough was born on 25 November 1837, in Clifton, Bristol, and educated at Rugby School in Warwickshire from 1851.

He was added to the Commander-in-Chief’s list of potential officers in February 1853, aged barely 16. He was commissioned ensign by purchase in the 77th Regiment of Foot on 22 March 1855, and promoted lieutenant on 3 October of the same year. He achieved his captaincy by purchase on 30 December 1864. He was granted a brevet majority on 1 October 1877 which was made substantive on 2 February 1878.

Bengough was versed in languages and used that skill to produce a booklet on the Zulu language just before he left England. The booklet was made available in the Colony. And, even though the booklet was not officially required, it still received publicity through a mention in the local press and in the General Orders. Towards the end of the Crimean War, Bengough entered that war. Bengough also served in Australia and India.

== The Anglo-Zulu Wars ==
Lt-Col Bengough arrived in Natal with the 77th Foot in December 1878. He was placed in command of the 2nd Battalion Natal Native Contingent, which formed part of Durnford’s Column, and which was left to protect the frontier at Kranz Kop on the departure of that force to join Glyn’s Column. He crossed the Buffalo River in command of the battalion on 22 January 1879. On receipt of the news of the disaster at Isandlwana, he hastened towards Rorke's Drift, intending to join the General’s force. En route, he received orders to proceed to Helpmakaar near Dundee, KwaZulu-Natal. Bengough was ordered to Umsinga, where, despite the desertion of large numbers of his men, he constructed Fort Bengough. He joined the division of General Edward Newdigate in May, in command of the battalion of which the numbers had increased and the discipline improved. He and the battalion took part in the advance into Zululand. He commanded the headquarters and three companies which were present at the Battle of Ulundi. Bengough was Mentioned in Despatches by General Newdigate on 6 July 1879, who reported the good service rendered by the battalion in scouting and outpost duties during the action. Bengough then served in command of the battalion in Russell’s Column until the capture of the King Cetewayo, when it was disbanded.

Bengough visited the kraal near where British officer Louis-Napoleon, Prince Imperial had been killed on 1 July and recalled that he 'brought away as a memento of the sad event a knobkerry stick, which I found in the kraal, and which now hangs in the hall of my house.' In the wake of a famous battle, especially one that marked the culmination of a war such as Ulundi on 4 July 1879, every European involved in the battle appeared to want to own an object that could serve as a reminder of the event.

== Later career ==
In common with a number of other officers after the Anglo-Zulu War, Major Bengough was promoted to brevet lieutenant colonel on 29 November 1879, he returned to regimental duty on 21 June 1880, and he received substantive promotion to that rank on 1 July 1881. He was on half-pay for a period commencing on 29 April 1882, when he was appointed Assistant Adjutant General at Madras. and was promoted colonel on 29 November 1883. He took part in the Third Anglo-Burmese War, and was Mentioned in Despatches on 26 March 1886. He was given command of a Brigade in the Madras Army on 8 November 1886, and was appointed a Companion of the Order of the Bath (CB) on 26 November 1886. He relinquished command of the brigade on 13 November 1891. He was appointed local major general, when he went to Jamaica on 25 October 1893. The rank was made permanent on 13 February 1894, and he relinquished the Jamaica command on 19 December 1894.

His last command was of the 1st Infantry Brigade of the Aldershot Division with the rank of major general, he relinquished command on 1 December 1897. He retired from the service on 29 November 1898; Bengough himself says that he did so "a little before the Boer War of 1899". He was promoted Knight Commander of the Order of the Bath (KCB) on 26 June 1908. He died in West Bognor on 20 March 1922.

== Writings ==
- Bengough, HM (1913). Memories of a Soldiers Life. London: Edward Arnold. pp. 211.
- "Mounted infantry" (translated from the "Voyennei sbornik," a Russian military magazine in 1883)
- Bengough, Colonel HM (1892). Lecture on Modern infantry fire tactics. (Offensive.) ... on Tuesday, December 6, 1892, in the Prince Consort's and Military ... C. Mansfield Clarke, ... in the chair. Gale & Polden. p. 108.

== Interest in sport ==
Whilst commanding the 1st Infantry Brigade in Aldershot in the 1890s he expressed the opinion that: "There can be no better pastime for soldiers than football, combining as it does skill, judgment, pluck. resource, activity — all soldierly qualities — and affording amusement to all, from the recruit enjoying the humble punt-about on the parade groundto the crowds of enthusiasts keenly watching a hard contested struggle for the final ties for the Army Cup."

In his memoirs he gives an account of his adventures in the realm of sport — pig-sticking, tiger-shooting, and pursuing other forms of game in India and elsewhere.
