= John Grinlinton =

Ceylonese politician

Sir John Joseph Grinlinton was a member of the Legislative Council of Ceylon. He was knighted by letters patent in 1894.
