= Surveyor General of Sri Lanka =

- Incumbent; W. Sudath L. C. Perera since September 2023
- Department of Survey
- Formation: 2 August 1800
- First holder: Joseph Jonville
- Website: Survey Department of Sri Lanka

Surveyor General of Sri Lanka is the head of Department of Survey of Sri Lanka. The post was established on 2 August 1800 with the formation of the Surveyor General's Department by a proclamation of Governor Frederick North at Galle.

Joseph Jonville was appointed as the Colonial Surveyor General, residing principally in Colombo and receiving orders directly from the government. Under him five principal surveyors were appointed and the land divided among them in the following manner. "One shall superintend the survey from the River of Chilaw to the Calanie Ganga, one from the Calanie Ganga to the River of Galle, one from the River of Galle to the North Easterly extremity of the Mahagampatto: to the Northern extremity of the District of Mulletivoe, and the remaining one from the Northern extremity of the District of Mulletivoe to the River of Chilaw, and shall be thus distinguished, the Surveyor of Negombo, of Colombo, of Matara, of Trincomalee, of Jaffna-Patam."

The post of Surveyor General was often combined with that of Civil Engineer and Commissioner of Roads. The department, during the first fifty years, was mainly engaged in the survey of scattered allotments of land for sale to private parties. The first title plan was issued by the new department on 20 August 1800 surveyed by C. Schneider.

The current Surveyor General is W. Sudath L. C. Perera.

== List of Surveyors General ==
No.	Surveyor General	Took office	Left office
1st	Joseph Jonville	2 August 1800	1805
2nd	George Atkinson	1805	1811
3rd	Gualterus Schneider	1811	1833
4th	Francis Brooke Norris	1833	1846
5th	William Henry Simms	1846	1854
6th	William Driscoll Gosset	1855	1858
7th	Charles Sims	1858	1865
8th	Amelius Beauclerk Fyers	1866	1883
9th	Francis Coningsby Hannam Clarke	1883	1893
10th	David George Mantell	1894	1896
11th	Frederick Grinlinton	1896	1904
12th	Philip David Warren	1904	1910
13th	Robert Stanser Templeton	1910	1915
14th	Walter Culpepper Stanser Ingles	1915	1923
15th	Arthur Joseph Wickwar	1923	1927
16th	Arthur Harry Gerald Dawson	1927	1932
17th	George Kraal Thornhill	1932	1937
18th	Lionel Gilbert Ollyett Woodhouse	1937	1943
19th	R. J. Johnston	1943	1946
20th	Ian Froome Wilson	1946	1951
21st	G. B. King	1951	1954
22nd	N. S. Perera	1954	1958
23rd	V. Rasaretnam	1958	1961
24th	J. L. T. E. Dassenaike	1961	1961
25th	S. Karthigesu	1961	1965
26th	J. C. Chanmugam	1965	1966
27th	F. H. Gunasekara	1966	1967
28th	P. U. Ratnatunga	1967	1968
29th	C. T. Goonawardana	1968	1970
30th	C. Vanniasingam	1970	1971
31st	R. A. Gunawardana	1971	1973
32nd	A. M. Cumaraswamy	1973	1973
33rd	S. J. Munasinghe	1973	1981
34th	S. D. F. C. Nanayakkara	1981	1989
35th	S. T. Herat	1989	1991
36th	E. M. Perera	1991	1991
37th	Thamotharam Somasekaram	1991	1992
38th	S. Berugoda	1992	1993
39th	N. C. Seneviratne	1993	1996
40th	M. P. Salgado	1996	1996
41st	K. L. A. Ranasinghe Silva	1996	2003
42nd	P. A. Ariyaratne	2003	2004
43rd	B. J. P. Mendis	2004	2009
44th	S. M. W. Fernando	2009	2013
45th	Kanagaratnam Thavalingam	2013	March 2014
46th	Nihal Gunawardena	March 2014	May 2014
47th	Palitha Udayakantha	30 May 2014	March 2019
48th	S. M. P. P. Sangakkara	March 2019	February 2020
49th	S. D. P. J. Dampegama	February 2020	February 2020
50th	A. L. S. C. Perera	February 2020	May 2021 May
51st	W.T.M.S.B.Tennakoon	June 2021	November 2021
52nd	A. Dissanayake	December 2021	December 2022
53rd	S. Sivanantharajah	January 2023	August 2023
54th	W. Sudath L. C. Perera	September 2023	January 2024
55th	U.K.S.P.Wijesingha	January 2025	January 2025
56th	Y.G.Gnanathilaka	January 2025	up to now
