= Survey Department of Sri Lanka =

Department of Survey
- මිනින්දෝරු දෙපාර්තමේන්තුව நில அளவைத் திணைக்களமானது

Agency overview
- Formed: August 2, 1800; 226 years ago
- Jurisdiction: Government of Sri Lanka
- Headquarters: 150 Kirula road, Colombo 5; 6.892217°N 79.873880°E
- Employees: 5968 (2016)
- Annual budget: Rs 3.43 billion (2016)
- Minister responsible: Gayantha Karunathilaka, Minister of Lands and Parliamentary Reforms
- Agency executive: Palitha Udayakantha, Surveyor General
- Parent department: Ministry of Lands and Parliamentary Reforms
- Key document: Survey Act, No. 17 of 2002
- Website: survey.gov.lk

The Department of Survey of Sri Lanka (also known as the Department of the Surveyor General) (Sinhala: ශ්‍රී ලංකා මිනින්දෝරු දෙපාර්තමේන්තුව Shri Lanka Minindoru Departhamenthuwa) is a non-ministerial government department in Sri Lanka. Established on 2 August 1800, it is the oldest unchanged government department in the country. The department is responsible for national surveying and mapping. It is also the national focal point of GIS and Remote Sensing with representation in the Global Mapping Project organised by the International Steering Committee for Global Mapping (ISCGM). The head of the department is Surveyor General of Sri Lanka.
