= Pennycuick =

Pennycuick may refer to:

- Charles Edward Ducat Pennycuick (1844–1902), British colonial administrator
- John Pennycuick (disambiguation), the name of various people
- Kenneth Pennycuick (1911–1995), British philatelist
- Rupert Pennycuick (1893–1963), Australian cricketer
- Tracy Pennycuick, American politician
- Colin James Pennycuick (1933-2019), English zoologist

== See also ==
- Penicuik, a town in Midlothian, Scotland
- Pennyquick, a place near Bath, Somerset, England
