= Lionel Frederick Lee =

Treasurer of Ceylon
- In office 1 April 1899 – 4 December 1899
- Preceded by: Frederick Richard Saunders
- Succeeded by: Charles Edward Ducat Pennycuick

Mayor of Colombo
- In office October 1887 – November 1887
- Preceded by: George Thomas Michael O'Brien
- Succeeded by: H. H. Cameron

Personal details
- Born: 4 December 1845 Colombo, British Ceylon
- Died: 4 December 1899 (aged 54) Colombo, Ceylon
- Resting place: Colombo General Cemetery
- Spouse: Ellen Annie Norfor (m. 1868, died)
- Parent(s): George Lee, Martha née Austin
- Relatives: Henry Austin (brother); Gertrude Austin (sister)
- Profession: Civil servant

Lionel Frederick Lee (4 December 1845 – 4 December 1899), served as the Mayor of Colombo in 1887 and Treasurer of Ceylon in 1899.

Lionel Frederick Lee was born 4 December 1845 in Colombo, British Ceylon, the eldest son of George Lee, the Postmaster General of Ceylon (1844–1860) and Martha née Austin.

He joined the Ceylon Civil Service in 1864, at age nineteen, and was the Superintendent of the Census in 1881 and 1891, whilst acting as Registrar-General. He served as District Judge in Kegalle, Tangalle, Galle, Matara and Jaffna; as Principal Collector of Customs; and Fiscal at Colombo and Kandy.

On 1 August 1868 he married Ellen Annie Norfor (1846–?), the fourth daughter of Robert Wright Norfor (1815–1864), the Commissioner of Stamps, Madras, and Amelia Wilhelmina Boxley, at the Holy Trinity Church St Sebastian Hill, Colombo.

He died on 4 December 1899, at age 54, whilst still serving as Treasurer of Ceylon. His position was filled by Charles Edward Ducat Pennycuick, the Postmaster General of Ceylon.

Government offices
Preceded by Frederick Richard Saunders	Treasurer of Ceylon; 1899	Succeeded by Charles Edward Ducat Pennycuick
