= Charles Edward Ducat Pennycuick =

Charles Edward Ducat Pennycuick CMG

Postmaster General of Ceylon
- In office 1896–1899
- Preceded by: Lionel Frederick Lee
- Succeeded by: Henry Luttrell Moysey

Treasurer of Ceylon
- In office 1899–1901
- Preceded by: Frederick Richard Saunders
- Succeeded by: Hardinge Hay Cameron

Personal details
- Born: 15 October 1844 Poona, India
- Died: 23 January 1902 (aged 58) Newton Stewart, Wigtownshire, Scotland
- Spouse: Clementina née Woodhead m.1881
- Children: Agnes Helen, James Alexander Charles
- Parent(s): John Pennycuick, Sarah Farrell
- Education: Cheltenham College
- Occupation: public servant

Charles Edward Ducat Pennycuick CMG (15 October 1844 – 23 January 1902) was the Mayor of Colombo (1893–1895), the Postmaster General of Ceylon and Director of Telegraphs (1896–1899) and the Treasurer of Ceylon (1899–1901).

Charles Edward Ducat Pennycuick was born in Poona, India, on 15 January 1844, the youngest son of Brigadier John Pennycuick, who died during the Second Anglo-Sikh War at the Battle of Chillianwala in the Punjab and Sarah Farrell (1805–1878). He joined the Ceylon Civil Service and in 1878 was appointed acting District Judge, Police Magistrate and Coroner in Kurunegala. The following year as the District Judge and Police Magistrate at Badulla. He was elected as Mayor of Colombo in October 1893, serving until April 1895. He was subsequently appointed Postmaster General of Ceylon in 1896 and he finished his career as Treasurer of Ceylon. In the 1901 King's Birthday Honours he was awarded a Companion of the Order of St Michael and St George (CMG) for his services as Treasurer.

Pennycruick married Clementina Woodhead (1852–1925) on 22 February 1881 at St. Nicholas' Church, Brighton, Sussex. They had two children, Agnes Helen (1887–1948) and James Alexander Charles (1890–1966). Their son, James, gained the rank of Colonel in the Royal Engineers, fought in Malay during the Second World War and was awarded the Distinguished Service Order.

His elder brother, Colonel John Pennycuick, was a British Army engineer and civil servant, who also served as a member of the Madras Legislative Council. As an engineer in the Public Works Department, he was responsible for the construction of the Mullaperiyar Dam across the Periyar River in Kerala. Pennecuick’s main claim to fame appears to be that, as Mayor, he considered objectionable the killing of stray dogs by drowning them in Beira Lake, so in 1894 he ordered the construction of a gas chamber for the purpose.

Government offices
Preceded by Thomas Edward Barnes Skinner	Postmaster General of Ceylon; 1896–1899	Succeeded by Henry Luttrell Moysey
Preceded by Lionel Frederick Lee	Treasurer of Ceylon; 1899–1901	Succeeded by Hardinge Hay Cameron
