= The Colombo Journal =

Sri Lankan English language newspaper

- Type: Bi-weekly newspaper
- Founded: 1 January 1832
- Ceased publication: 31 December 1833
- Language: English
- Country: Ceylon
- OCLC number: 42284480

The Colombo Journal was a short-lived English-language bi-weekly newspaper in Ceylon. The newspaper started on 1 January 1832 with George Lee as editor. George Lee was the Superintendent of the Government Press and later Postmaster General. The newspaper had the support of the government and Governor Robert Wilmot-Horton. Apart from Horton and Lee other senior government officials who wrote for the newspaper included the governor's private secretary Henry Tufnell and George Turnour. Criticism of the British government led to the newspaper being closed by the Colonial Office on 31 December 1833.
