= William Barton =

William, Will, or Bill Barton may refer to:

== Arts and entertainment ==
- William Barton (hymnologist) (1598–1678), English hymnologist
- William Barton (heraldist) (1754–1817), American designer of the Great Seal of the United States
- William Barton (writer) (born 1950), American science fiction writer
- William Barton (musician) (born 1981), Australian didgeridoo player

== Law and politics ==
- Sir William Barton (British politician) (1862–1957), British politician
- William E. Barton (1868–1955), U.S. representative from Missouri
- Sir William Pell Barton (1871–1956), British member of the Indian Political Service
- William Hickson Barton (1917–2013), Canadian diplomat
- William T. Barton (born 1933), American politician

== Sports ==
- William Barton (English cricketer) (1777–1825), English cricketer
- William Barton (New Zealand cricketer) (1858–1942), cricketer from New Zealand
- Bill Barton (footballer) (born 1936), Australian rules footballer
- Will Barton (born 1991), American basketball player

== Others ==
- William Barton (priest) (fl. 1415–1421), English cleric, Archdeacon of Totnes
- William Barton (soldier) (1748–1831), American Revolutionary War soldier
- William P. C. Barton (1786–1856), American physician
- William Barton (postmaster) (c. 1796–1874), British soldier and Ceylonese public servant
