= The Ceylon Chronicle =

Sri Lankan English language newspaper

- Founded: 3 May 1837
- Ceased publication: 3 September 1838
- Political alignment: Pro-government
- Language: English
- Country: Ceylon
- OCLC number: 751749270

The Ceylon Chronicle was a short-lived English-language newspaper in Ceylon. The newspaper started on 3 May 1837 with Rev. Samuel Owen Glenie as editor. Rev. Glenie was the Anglican Colonial Chaplain of St. Paul's Church and later Archdeacon of Colombo. Although owned privately by a group of civil servants, the newspaper took a pro-government stance and had the support of senior government officials. Governor Robert Wilmot-Horton, Treasurer Temple, Postmaster General George Lee, Acting Chief Justice Sergeant Rough, Auditor General Henry Marshall and Proctor Henry Staples all wrote for the newspaper. The Ceylon Chronicle was a counter-weight to The Observer and Commercial Advertiser which opposed the government.

Rev. Glenie stepped down as editor after his bishop objected and was succeeded by Postmaster General George Lee. The newspaper ceased publication on 3 September 1838. The Chronicle′s printing press was bought by Mackenzie Ross who started The Ceylon Herald four days later on 7 September 1838.
