= John Pennycuick =

John Pennycuick may refer to:

- Brigadier John Pennycuick (brigadier) (1789–1849), British Army officer who died at the Battle of Chillianwalla in the Second Anglo-Sikh War
- Colonel John Pennycuick (engineer) (1841–1911), British Army engineer and civil servant, son of Brigadier John Pennycuick
- Sir John Pennycuick (judge) (1899–1982), English barrister and judge, tennis player, son of Colonel John Pennycuick
