= Harry Archibald Burden =

Ceylonese public servant

- Born: 23 August 1883; Hambledon, Surrey
- Died: 15 January 1964 (aged 80); Ascot, Berkshire
- Education: Bradford Grammar School
- Alma mater: Trinity College, Cambridge
- Occupation: public servant
- Known for: Postmaster General of Ceylon
- Term: 1929 - 1933
- Predecessor: Maurice Salvador Sreshta
- Successor: John Radley Walters
- Spouse: Caro Cecil Jackson
- Children: Hugh Archibald Nain, Anna Catherine, Paul Burden
- Parent(s): Harry Caws Burden (father), Kate Stone née Shepherd (mother)

Harry Archibald Burden (23 August 1883 - 15 January 1964) was a Ceylonese public servant and the thirteenth Postmaster General of Ceylon (1929-1933).

Harry Archibald Burden was born in Hambledon, Surrey on 23 August 1883 the son of Harry Caws Burden (1854-1938) and Kate Stone née Shepherd (1888-1961). He was educated at Bradford Grammar School and Trinity College, Cambridge, where he graduated with a Bachelor of Arts. He joined the Ceylon Civil Service on 17 November 1906. He was appointed as the assistant government agent, Southern Province in January 1908, assistant government agent, Central Province in January 1910, police magistrate, Kandy in November 1911, assistant government agent, Kegalle in August 1914, district judge, Nuwara Eliya in July 1917, assistant government agent, Hambantota in September 1919, deputy collector of customs, Colombo June 1920, assistant government agent, Kalutara in July 1923, and rubber controller for Ceylon in June 1927. In 1929 he was appointed as Postmaster General serving until he retired in 1933.

In 1946 he was appointed as the joint-chair of the Burma War Losses Claims Commission.

He married Caro Cecil Jackson (1888-1961) and they had two children, Hugh Archibald Nain (1913-1985) and Anna Catherine (1910-1972). His son Hugh was a notable English actor and playwright.

Burden died on 15 January 1964 in Ascot, Berkshire.

Government offices
Preceded by Maurice Salvador Sreshta	Postmaster General of Ceylon; 1929–1933	Succeeded by John Radley Walters
