= Pradani Muthirulappa Pillai =

Minister of Ramnad

Pradani Muthirulappa Pillai (also known as Muthu Irulappa Pillai) was a prominent statesman and Pradani (chief minister)of the Kingdom of Ramnad during the late 18th century. He administered as regent during the reign of muthuramalinga sethupathy who was minor just an infant at that time and he is remembered for his administrative acumen, welfare measures, and infrastructure projects. His tenure marked a transformative era in Ramnad's history, with significant advancements in governance and development.Notable developments happened during his administration include Asia longest corridor of Ramanathaswamy temple ( Rameswaram)"chokkadan mandapam". ,He built chattrams for pilgrims.He and his team researched and developed a plan to divert the river flow of mullai and periyar which is implemented with modification by John pennycuick for mullai periyar dam. He made several measures to alleviate drought. He is still valued by his people. Pradhani Muthirulappa Pillai is remembered as a practical and selfless leader who prioritized the welfare of his people. He gave importance to secularism. He has immense faith in God which can be perceived from his contribution to temples located in the region.

== Early life ==
Muthirulappa Pillai was born in a Tamil Vellalar family, a prominent agrarian and land-owning community in Tamil Nadu. His father, Sundra Pandya Pillai, was a respected figure in the region. While the exact date of his birth remains uncertain, his upbringing and education prepared him for a career in administration and governance. Muthirulappa displayed organizational skills and a strong sense of responsibility from a young age, qualities that later defined his leadership.

== Historical context ==
The late 18th century was a tumultuous time for the Kingdom of Ramnad. The Marava chieftains, including the Sethupathis, resisted the suzerainty of the Nawab of Arcot, who was under British influence. The Nawab, in response, reduced the Sethupathy to the status of a tributary landlord, demanding an annual tribute of 175,000 rupees.

During this time, the kingdom was governed by three Pradanis: Muthia Pillai, Vellu Pillai, and Sankaran Pillai. These administrators neglected state affairs, leading to widespread mismanagement. Muthirulappa Pillai rose to prominence during this crisis and eventually took sole control of the administration.

== Administrative reforms and governance ==
Muthirulappa Pillai is credited with implementing wide-ranging reforms that restored stability to Ramnad and improved the lives of its people.

=== Revenue and tax reforms ===
One of his most notable contributions was reforming the tax and revenue systems. He introduced efficient accounting practices and ensured the kingdom’s financial stability, enabling the timely payment of tribute to the Nawab. To maintain peace and advance internal reforms, he established diplomatic ties with the British, who were becoming increasingly influential in the region. The *Gazetteer of India* noted:

 "He realized that he should placate the British in order to bring effective internal reforms, since the British were having the leading strings of the Nawab in their hands."[4]

=== Public welfare and infrastructure ===
Muthirulappa Pillai initiated several projects for public welfare. He constructed chattrams (rest houses) for pilgrims, developed roads through forests, and invested in the restoration of temples. Among his most significant achievements was the completion of the Chokkatan Mandapam in the Rameswaram Temple, now considered one of the largest temple corridors in Asia.

== Water management and the Mullaperiyar Vision ==
In 1789, Muthirulappa Pillai conducted a study to divert water from the Periyar River to the drought-prone areas of southern Tamil Nadu via the Vaigai River. Although the project could not be executed due to insufficient funds, his vision laid the foundation for the Mullaperiyar Dam, built over a century later in 1895 under the supervision of British engineer John Pennycuick.

== Ideological difference with the Sethupathy ==
As Muthuramalinga Sethupathy came of age, ideological differences arose between the king and his minister. Muthirulappa Pillai advocated cooperation with the British to maintain stability as it will help the kingdom while the young king, influenced by nationalist sentiment, sought to oppose British rule. This conflict ultimately led to Muthirulappa’s dismissal.

The Ramnad Manual recounts that the Sethupathy accused Muthirulappa of arrogance and excessive influence due to his close association with British officials. After his dismissal, Muthirulappa moved to Madurai, where he served as a "Renter" for British revenue.

== Legacy ==
Muthirulappa Pillai’s contributions to the Kingdom of Ramnad remain highly regarded. His reforms in governance, infrastructure development, and water management have left a lasting impact. The construction of the Mullaperiyar Dam stands as a testament to his visionary planning.

Despite his eventual dismissal, Muthirulappa Pillai is remembered as a practical and selfless leader who prioritized the welfare of his people. His administrative measures and development projects continue to influence the region's history.
