= Abdon Ignatius Perera =

- Born: 30 July 1888; Colombo, Ceylon
- Died: 5 December 1955 (aged 67); Hampstead, London, England
- Education: St. Benedict's College, Colombo, London City and Guilds College
- Occupation: public servant
- Known for: Postmaster General of Ceylon
- Term: 1947–1951
- Predecessor: John Pringle Appleby
- Successor: V. A. Nicholas
- Spouse: Lilian Grace née Ameresekera
- Children: Kenneth St Clair, Forester Geoffrey Ivor
- Parent(s): Don Nicholas Perera; Clara née Peiris

Abdon Ignatius Perera JP, CBE (30 July 1888 – 5 December 1955) was the first Ceylonese Postmaster General and Director of Telecommunications, serving in the position from 1947 to 1951.

Abdon Ignatius Perera was born 30 July 1888 in Colombo to Don Nicholas Perera and Clara née Peiris. Perera was educated at St. Benedict's College, Colombo (1894–1903), where he passed the Cambridge Junior Examination. He passed the first class examination in Telegraphy and the second class examination in the Telephony at the London City and Guilds College.

He then joined the Department of Archaeology as a temporary clerk in 1905 and joined the Department of Posts and Telecommunications on 1 February 1906 as a Second Class Post Master in the Department of Posts and Telecommunications. In 1923 he was promoted to first class postmaster and in 1928 to investigator. In 1931 he was appointed as the Pannaradhana Telecommunication Officer and in 1936 he was appointed as the Superintendent of Telecommunication Transport. He was appointed Assistant Postmaster General in 1943, serving as the acting Postmaster General and Director of Telecommunications on several occasions in 1945, 1946 and 1947. Perera was officially appointed Postmaster General and Director of Telecommunications on 1 January 1948, succeeding John Pringle Appleby, he served in this post for three years and eleven months until 1 November 1951. Whilst he was Postmaster General he established the Domestic Air Postal Service, on 7 February 1949, which provided a same day distribution of mail between Colombo and Jaffna. He initiated a departmental van service on 1 April 1948. He also reduced postage on 25 January 1949 to provide relief to the general poor. During his tenure the country was recognised as an independent member of the Universal Postal Union on 13 July 1949. He also oversaw the transformation of the post office from English only into the national languages after independence.

He was a Justice of the Peace in the Colombo Judicial District and a Major in the British Army. In 1948 he was awarded an Order of the British Empire and in 1951 he was awarded the Commander of the British Empire.

After he retired from the postal service on 1 November 1951 he was appointed Trade Commissioner of the Ceylon High Commission in the United Kingdom.

He was married to Lilian Grace Ameresekera and they had eight sons and two daughters. Archibald, Forrester Geoffrey Ivor, Kenneth St Clair (1922–1988), Vere, Fritz, Owen, Nicholas, Michael, Dorothy and Edith.

Perera died in London on 5 December 1955 at the age of 67.

Government offices
Preceded by John Pringle Appleby	Postmaster General of Ceylon; 1947–1951	Succeeded by V. A. Nicholas
