= John Radley Walters =

British born public servant in Ceylon

- Born: 20 January 1888; Ilfracombe, Devon, England
- Died: 27 September 1972 (aged 84); Canberra, Australian Capital Territory, Australia
- Education: Sherborne School
- Alma mater: University of Cambridge
- Occupation: public servant
- Known for: Postmaster General of Ceylon
- Term: 1933 - 1940
- Predecessor: Harry Archibald Burden
- Successor: John Pringle Appleby
- Spouse: Margaret Emmy née Reinmann
- Children: Margaret Ann (b.1919)
- Parent(s): John Walters (father), Ann Sears (mother)

John Radley Walters (20 January 1888 - 27 September 1972) was a British born Ceylonese public servant, who served as the 14th Postmaster General of Ceylon between 1934 and 1940.

John Radley Walters, was born in Ilfracombe, Devon on 20 January 1888, the eldest of three children and the only son of Rev. John Walters (1839-1904) and Ann née Sears (1858-1942). He studied at the Sherborne School, Dorset, from 1902 to 1907, before attending the University of Cambridge obtaining a Bachelor of Arts degree.

At the age of 23, in November 1911, he joined the Ceylon Civil Service and in December was attached to the Kandy Kachcheri, in May 1912 he was transferred to the Galle Kachcheri and in November 1912 he was appointed as a police magistrate in Negombo. In May 1915 he was appointed as a police magistrate in Gampola, in July 1917 as the district judge in Badulla, in December 1920 as police magistrate in Kurunegala, and in December 1921 as assistant government agent in Mullaitivu. This was followed as the district judge on Nuwara Eliya in July 1923 and concurrently as assistant government agent in Nuwara Eliya in November 1923. In February 1924 he was made the assistant government agent for Kegalle, then the district judge for Matara in October 1926, the assistant government agent for Trincomalee in March 1927, the assistant government agent for Badulla in April 1928, returning to the position of assistant government agent in Trincomalee in June 1929 and then in March 1931 as the assistant government agent for the North Western Province.

In September 1933 he was appointed as the Postmaster General of Ceylon and Director of Telecommunications, following the retirement of Harry Archibald Burden. Walters was responsible for establishing the Ceylon-Indo air mail service in July 1936. Following his tenure as Postmaster General he was appointed as the government agent for Uva. After retiring from the Ceylon Civil Service he and his wife migrated to Australia, settling in Canberra, where he died on 27 September 1972, at the age of 84.

Government offices
Preceded by Harry Archibald Burden	Postmaster General of Ceylon; 1933–1940	Succeeded by John Pringle Appleby
