= John Pringle Appleby =

John Pringle Appleby CMG, JP
- Born: 1892; Morpeth, Northumberland, England
- Died: 29 March 1966 (aged 73–74); Sidmouth, Devon, England
- Occupation: public servant
- Known for: Postmaster General of Ceylon
- Term: 1940–1946
- Predecessor: John Radley Walters
- Successor: Abdon Ignatius Perera
- Spouse: Minnie née Sams
- Children: 3
- Parent(s): Christopher Appleby, Margaret née Paley

Lieutenant-Colonel John Pringle Appleby CMG, JP (1892 – 29 March 1966) was the Postmaster General of Ceylon for seven years, between 1940 and 1947.

In 1907 he joined the Royal Mail, in 1921 was made a supplementary clerk, and in 1933 was appointed the postmaster in Okehampton. Appleby served in the Royal Signal Corps during World War I and was appointed as a 2nd Lieutenant in 1917.

On 4 July 1936, Appleby was made a Justice of the Peace for the District of Colombo, and on 1 October he was formally appointed as the Assistant Postmaster-General, replacing Gate Mudaliyar A. G. Tillekeratne. On several occasions he served as acting Postmaster General before being formally appointed to the position in early 1940. Between 1939 and 1946 the activities and advances in telecommunications were not given much publicity due to the war. It is known that in 1946 Appleby issued the first amateur radio transmitting licenses in the country.

In the 1945 New Year Honours list he was made a Companion of the Order of St Michael and St George for his services as Postmaster General. He retired from the Ceylon Civil Service in late 1946.

Appleby died on 29 March 1996 in Sidmouth, Devon.

Government offices
Preceded by John Radley Walters	Postmaster General of Ceylon; 1940–1946	Succeeded by Abdon Ignatius Perera
