= George William Stewart =

Third Postmaster General of Ceylon, serving from 1826 to 1833

Major George William Stewart

Postmaster General of Ceylon
- In office 1826 - 1833
- Preceded by: Louis Sansoni
- Succeeded by: George Lee

Personal details
- Born: 25 September 1793
- Died: 20 April 1841 (aged 47) Boulogne-sur-Mer, France
- Spouse: Maria Wilhelmina Sophia née Tranchell (m.1807)
- Relations: James (brother); William (brother)
- Children: Sophia
- Occupation: military officer

Major George William Stewart (25 September 1793 - 20 April 1841), was the third Postmaster General of Ceylon, serving from 1826 to 1833.

Stewart was a lieutenant in the 19th Regiment of Foot, who were stationed in Ceylon between 1796 and 1820, during which time they were involved in the Kandyan Wars. In 1810 he was promoted to captain. He was appointed as the Postmaster General of Ceylon in 1826. During his tenure he was instrumental in extending the postal services to major towns in the colony. He went on to be commissioned in 1830 as a major in the Ceylon Rifle Regiment. After his retirement he became an oil merchant and had a chekku mill, and was known as 'Vanniya Stewart'.

On 9 February 1807 Stewart married Maria Wilhelmina Sophia Tranchell (1791-1867), the daughter of Carl Jonas Tranchell (1754-1807), the Consul for Sweden in Ceylon. They had one daughter, Sophia (1824-1906).

Stewart died on 20 April 1841 in Boulogne-sur-Mer, France, at the age of 48.

Government offices
Preceded by Louis Sansoni	Postmaster General of Ceylon; 1826–1833	Succeeded by George Lee
