= Francis Jagoe Smith =

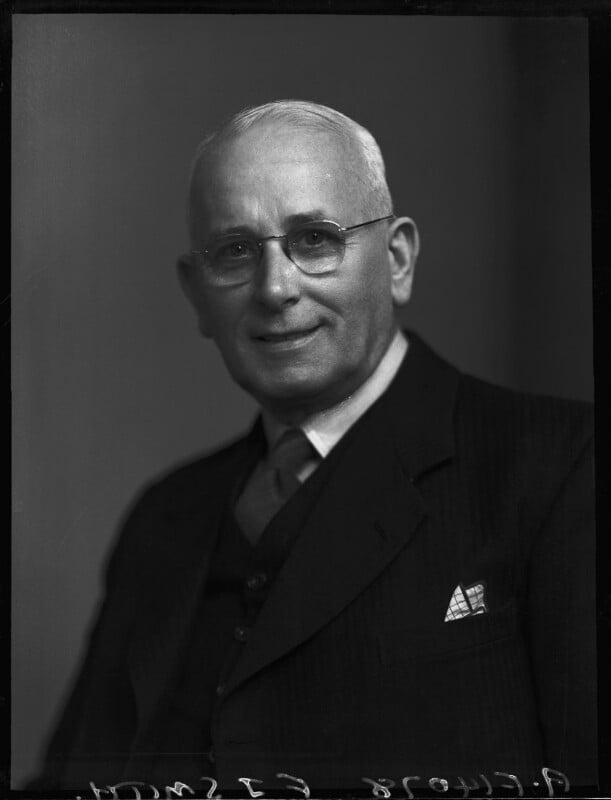
- Smith in 1951
- Born: 9 September 1873; Barnet, Hertfordshire, England
- Died: 1 April 1969 (aged 95); Wimbledon, London, England
- Education: Merchant Taylors' School, Oxford University
- Occupation: public servant
- Known for: Postmaster General of Ceylon
- Term: 1913–1923
- Predecessor: Arthur Sampson Pagden
- Successor: Maurice Salvador Sreshta
- Spouse: Eleanor Margaret née Booth
- Children: Norman Jagoe

Francis Jagoe Smith CMG (9 September 1873 – 1 April 1969) was the Postmaster General of Ceylon and Director of Telegraphs, serving in the position from 1913 to 1923.

Francis Jagoe Smith was born on the 9th of September 1873 in Barnet, Hertfordshire, the son of Henry Francis Smith. He was educated at Merchant Taylors' School and went on to study at Oxford University, where he obtained a Master of Arts.

Smith traveled to Ceylon in 1896, to take up a position as a cadet in the Ceylon Civil Service. In 1905 he was appointed as the second assistant Colonial Secretary. In 1907 Smith, in conjunction with Hermann Albert Loos, compiled a publication containing all the enacted legislation applying to Ceylon, A Revised Edition of the Legislative Enactments of Ceylon.

In 1913 he was appointed as the Postmaster General of Ceylon and Director of Telegraphs, succeeding Arthur Sampson Pagden, CMG. During his tenure, May 1920, the first post and telegraph museum was established in the telegraph school at Central Telegraph Office, with the exhibits contained in a large wardrobe, including morse circuits and telecommunication instruments and equipment collected from post offices around the island.

In 1925 he was appointed as the Government Agent of the Northern Province and in 1927 he served as the acting Colonial Treasurer.

As part of the 1929 New Year Honours Smith was appointed as a Companion of the Order of St Michael and St George, for his services as acting Controller of Revenue in Ceylon.

He married Eleanor Margaret Booth at the Holy Trinity Church, Nuwara Eliya in 1913 and their son, Norman Jagoe (1915-1941), was a pilot with the Royal Air Force Volunteer Reserve (611 Squadron) who died in action during World War II. Smith died on 1 April 1969, at the age of 95, in Wimbledon, London.

== Bibliography ==
- Loos, Hermann Albert; Smith, Francis Jagoe (1907). Cottle, H. C. (ed.). A Revised Edition of the Legislative Enactments of Ceylon. Colombo, Ceylon: Government Printer. ISBN 9781279218747.

Government offices
Preceded by Arthur Sampson Pagden	Postmaster General of Ceylon; 1913–1923	Succeeded by Maurice Salvador Sreshta
