= Henry Austin Lee =

British diplomat, governor and landowner

Henry Austin Lee KCMG, CB
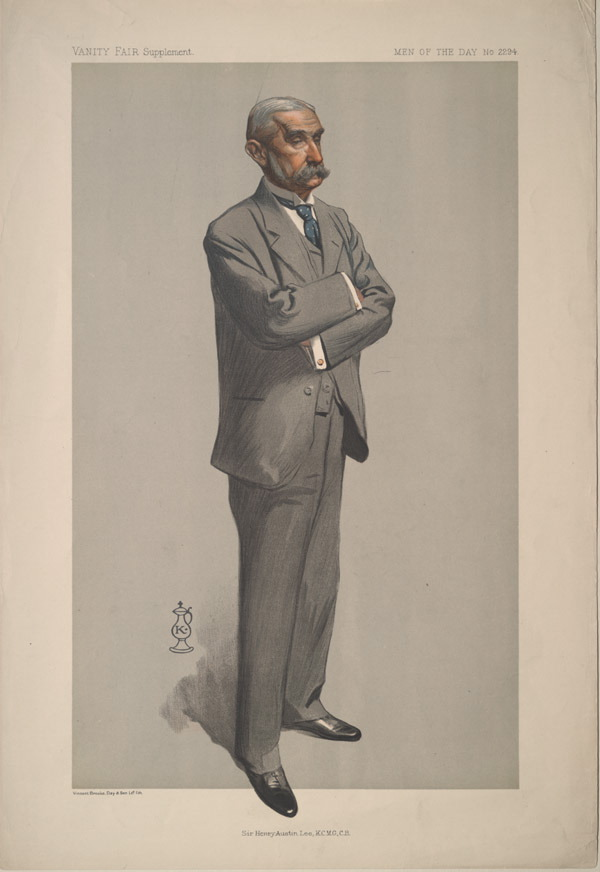

Personal details
- Born: 6 April 1847 Colombo, Ceylon
- Died: 7 November 1918 (aged 71) Jethou, Channel Islands
- Spouse: Madeleine de Wolf Smith (m.1892)
- Parent(s): George Lee, Martha née Austin
- Education: Elizabeth College, Guernsey, Pembroke College, Oxford
- Occupation: diplomat, governor, landowner

Sir Henry Austin Lee, KCMG, CB (6 April 1847 − 7 November 1918) was a British diplomat, governor and landowner. He was counselor of embassy, commercial attaché for France, Belgium, and Switzerland. He was a tenant of the Channel Island of Jethou from 1890 until his death; he was succeeded as tenant of Jethou by Compton Mackenzie.

Henry Austin Lee was born 6 April 1847 in Colombo, British Ceylon, the second son of George Lee, the Postmaster General of Ceylon (1844-1860) and Martha née Austin. He was educated at Elizabeth College, Guernsey, and then went to Pembroke College, Oxford. He joined the Foreign Office in 1870.

In 1871 he was appointed to the Foreign Office; where he served as a protocolist to the Sugar Conference in London in 1872; appointed British Commissioner in Paris, under article XXI of the Treaty of Commerce in November 1872; acted as Third Secretary in the Diplomatic Service from 6 August 1873. He was attached to the Embassy in Paris from November 1872 to July 1875. After serving on the joint Channel-Tunnel Commission in April 1875, he was appointed with Sir Edward Malet to negotiate the renewal of the Treaty of Commerce with Italy; was attached to the Marquis of Salisbury, Robert Gascoyne-Cecil's Special Embassy to Constantinople, in November 1876, and to the special Embassy during the Congress at Berlin in June 1878, as Private Secretary to the Earl of Beaconsfield, Benjamin Disraeli. He was Private Secretary to Sir Charles Wentworth Dilke, at the Foreign Office from 1880 to 1882; was a member, in 1881, of the Royal Commission for negotiating a Treaty of Commerce with France; was Private Secretary to Lord Edmond Fitzmaurice from 1883 to 1885, to James Bryce, 1st Viscount Bryce, in 1886, and to Sir James Fergusson, from 1886 to 1887. In December 1887 he was appointed Second Secretary to the Paris Embassy and acted as Private Secretary to the Ambassador, Robert Bulwer-Lytton, 1st Earl of Lytton. In 1891 he was selected to represent the British Government on the Council of the Suez Canal Company. In February 1892 he was appointed First Secretary in the Diplomatic Service and on the appointment of the Frederick Hamilton-Temple-Blackwood, Marquis of Dufferin and Ava as Ambassador in Paris, Lee became his Private Secretary, and continued in that capacity until the Hamilton-Temple-Blackwood's retirement in October 1896, when he was appointed Commercial Attache to Embassy in the place of Sir Joseph Archer Crowe.

In 1892 he married Madeleine de Wolf Smith, daughter of Benjamin Franklin Smith and widow of Arthur Taylor.

He was appointed a Companion of the Order of the Bath (CB) in the 1892 New Year Honours. He was knighted as a Knight Commander of the Order of St Michael and St George (KCMG) in the November 1902 Birthday Honours list, and was invested with the insignia by King Edward VII at Buckingham Palace on 18 December 1902.
