= The Ceylon Herald =

Sri Lankan English language newspaper

- Founder: Mackenzie Ross
- Founded: 7 September 1838
- Ceased publication: 30 June 1846
- Language: English
- Country: Ceylon
- Sister newspapers: The Overland Herald
- OCLC number: 751749281

The Ceylon Herald was an English-language newspaper in Ceylon. After The Ceylon Chronicle closed down on 3 September 1837 Mackenzie Ross bought the printing press and started The Ceylon Herald on 7 September 1838. The newspaper opposed the government bitterly. Governor Stewart-Mackenzie sued Mackenzie Ross for libel after The Ceylon Herald published an article alleging that the governor had gone to the Veddah country to purchase large amounts of land at nominal prices. Mackenzie Ross was acquitted after a trial before Chief Justice Anthony Oliphant.

The Ceylon Herald was sold to James Laing, the Deputy Postmaster in Kandy, on 29 November 1842. Under Laing's editorship the newspaper supported the government. Laing later sold the newspaper to another man who died in January 1845 after which the newspaper passed to his official administrator the Secretary of the District Court. The newspaper was edited by Knighton, Master of the Normal Seminary in Colombo, for a while before the printing press was sold to J. W. Schokman on 8 September 1845 for £1,178. Schokman however failed to settle the amounts due and on 1 July 1846 the printing press was sold to the owners of The Ceylon Times for £450. The last edition of The Ceylon Herald had been published on 30 June 1846.

The Ceylon Herald's sister newspaper, The Overland Herald, was published monthly from 24 June 1843 to 30 June 1846.
