= Hugh Burden =

British actor and playwright (1913–1985)

- Burden as Channing in Doctor Who: Spearhead from Space (1970)
- Born: 3 April 1913; Colombo, Ceylon
- Died: 16 May 1985 (aged 72); London, England
- Occupations: Actor and playwright
- Years active: 1937-1984

Hugh Archibald Nairn Burden (3 April 1913 – 16 May 1985) was a British actor and playwright.

== Early life ==
Hugh Archibald Nairn Burden was born as the eldest son of Harry Archibald Burden, a colonial official, and Caro Cecil née Jackson, on 3 April 1913 in Colombo, Ceylon. He was educated at Beaumont College in Berkshire, England, and trained in London at the Central School of Speech and Drama and RADA. He appeared on stage in repertory theatre in Croydon and in London's West End before military service in the Hampshire Regiment and the Indian Army from 1939 to 1942.

== Career ==
Burden made appearances in many UK television plays and series including Doctor Who: Spearhead from Space (1970), The Crezz (1976), Sykes (1979), Strange Report (1968) and The Avengers (1963). He played the title role in The Mind of Mr. J.G. Reeder (1969). His many film appearances include One of Our Aircraft Is Missing (1942), The Way Ahead (1944), Fame Is the Spur (1947), Malta Story (1953), Funeral in Berlin (1966), Blood from the Mummy's Tomb (1971) and The Ruling Class (1972).

Burden acted in radio plays and was known for readings of the works of T. S. Eliot and Evelyn Waugh. He also wrote several television and stage plays and was an Equity council member.

== Personal life ==
Burden married actress Joy Hodgkinson in 1950, and had a daughter with her, but the marriage was dissolved in 1955 on the grounds of her desertion. A subsequent marriage to Margaret de Lobera in 1957 was dissolved in 1962 on the grounds of his desertion.

== Selected filmography ==
=== Film ===
Year	Title	Role	Notes
1937	Death Croons the Blues	Viscount Brent	
1942	Ships with Wings	Sub.Lt. Weatherby	
1942	One of Our Aircraft Is Missing	John Glyn Haggard	Pilot in B for Bertie
1944	The Way Ahead	Pvt. Bill Parsons	
1947	Fame Is the Spur	Arnold Ryerson	
1948	Sleeping Car to Trieste	Mills	
1952	Ghost Ship	Dr. Fawcett	
1953	Malta Story	Eden, Security	
1961	No Love for Johnnie	Tim Maxwell	
1961	The Secret Partner	Charles Standish	
1966	Funeral in Berlin	Hallam	
1967	The Inn Way Out	Husband, and Bastard Son	(30 minute Short), with John le Mesurier
1969	The Best House in London	Lord Tennyson	
1971	The Statue	Sir Geoffrey	
1971	Blood from the Mummy's Tomb	Geoffrey Dandridge	
1972	The Ruling Class	Matthew Peake	
1973	The House in Nightmare Park	Reggie Henderson	
1975	One of Our Dinosaurs Is Missing	Haines	
1984	Dr. Fisher of Geneva	Divisonaire Krueger	TV film (final role)

=== Television ===
Year	Title	Role	Notes
1957	The Adventures of Robin Hood	Szeikel the Tailor	Episode: "The Frightened Tailor"
1960	No Hiding Place	Langford	Episode: "A Man of Straw"
1960	Maigret	Guillaume	Episode: "The Burglar's Wife"
1962	No Hiding Place	Rennington	Episode: "A Job for Johnny"
1963	The Avengers	Sir Bruno Laker	Episode: "The Grandeur That Was Rome"
1963	Ghost Squad	Rockworth	Episode: "Escape Route"
1963	Maigret	Marcel Lampson	Episode: "The Crime at Lock 14"
1965	The Man in Room 17	Charles Morrow	Episode: "The Millions of Muzafariyah"
1965	Z-Cars	Philip Turnbull-Smythe	Episode: "Cop and Blow"
1966	Public Eye	Hugh Clayton	Episode: "I Could Set it to Music"
1968	Strange Report	James	Episode: "REPORT 0649 SKELETON 'Let Sleeping Heroes Lie'"
1968	Man in a Suitcase	Dr. Maza	Episode: "The Revolutionaries"
1969 - 1971	The Mind of Mr. J.G. Reeder	J.G. Reeder	16 episodes
1970	Doctor Who	Channing	Serial: "Spearhead from Space" (4 episodes)
1970	The Misfit	Mr. Turngoose	Episode: "On Not Being Lost"
1974	Barlow	The Warden	Episode: "The Restitution"
1974	The Fall of Eagles	Protopopov	2 episodes
1976	The Crezz	Dr. Balfour Harvey	11 episodes
1979	Sykes	Head of Light Entertainment	Episode: "The BBC Honours Sykes"
1982	Crown Court	Percival Padmore Q.C.	Serial: "Soldier, Soldier" (3 episodes)
1983	Jemima Shore Investigates	Freddie Prideaux	Episode: "The Crime of the Dancing Duchess"
