= Vernon Abeysekera =

Sri Lankan civil servant (1919–2005)

Vernon Mathew Abeysekera

Postmaster General of Ceylon
- In office 1969–1970
- Preceded by: G. E. de S. Ellawala
- Succeeded by: C. J. Serasinghe

Government Agent of Jaffna
- In office 1966–1968
- Preceded by: Neville Jayaweera
- Succeeded by: Francis Cyril (F. C.) Pietersz

Personal details
- Born: Vernon Mathew Abeysekera; October 2, 1919 Ceylon
- Died: February 13, 2005 (aged 85) Burwood, Victoria, Australia
- Education: Royal College, Colombo; University College Colombo; University of London (BA Hons)
- Occupation: Civil servant, diplomat, broadcaster, author

Vernon Mathew Abeysekera (2 October 1919 – 13 February 2005) was a Sri Lankan civil servant, diplomat, and broadcaster. He served as the Postmaster General of Ceylon, Director of Radio Ceylon, and Government Agent of Jaffna, Galle, and Polonnaruwa.

== Early life and education ==
Abeysekera was born on 2 October 1919. He was educated at Royal College, Colombo and entered the University College Colombo, graduating with first-class honours in Classics from the affiliated University of London.

== Civil service career ==
Abeysekera joined the Ceylon Civil Service (CCS) and held administrative postings across the island, serving as Government Agent (GA) of Polonnaruwa and Galle. Recognized for his cultural and literary interests, he was appointed Director of Radio Ceylon. Between 1963 and 1971, he served on the Arts Council of Ceylon as Chairman of the Panel for Western Music, Ballet, and Drama. He also held diplomatic assignments abroad, serving as Assistant High Commissioner for Ceylon in London and later on a diplomatic posting in Karachi.

=== Government Agent of Jaffna ===
In early 1966, Prime Minister Dudley Senanayake assigned Abeysekera as the Government Agent of Jaffna District and he assumed duties in succession to Neville Jayaweera, serving until the end of 1968.

His administrative tenure directly coincided with a period of intense social upheaval across the northern peninsula, catalyzed by the 21 October 1966 anti-caste upsurge launched from Chunnakam. Under the leadership of the Untouchability Eradication Mass Movement (Theendaamai Ozhappu Vekujana Iyakkam) with the guidance of the Ceylon Communist Party (Maoist), mass direct-action campaigns sought temple entry and social desegregation under the Prevention of Social Disabilities Act No. 21 of 1957. Facing resistance from conservative temple trustees invoking Agamic orthodoxy, Abeysekera convened major conciliation conferences at the Jaffna Kachcheri on 28 March 1967 and 10 September 1967 with community leaders, parliamentarians, and temple representatives to avert sectarian violence.

These confrontations peaked in July 1968 during the annual festival at the Maviddapuram Kandaswamy Temple, where satyagrahis confronted orthodox defenders under C. Suntharalingam and T. Sivalingam behind barbed-wire barricades. The standoff drew nationwide political attention when MP S. D. Bandaranayake questioned the government in Parliament regarding delays in enforcing the Social Disabilities Act, leading Minister of State J. R. Jayewardene to order strict legal compliance and dispatch additional police detachments to Jaffna. Despite initial conciliation efforts collapsing into violent scuffles and a prolonged standoff, Abeysekera worked alongside senior police commanders on the ground to mediate between both sides, averting widespread bloodshed and negotiating an interim dismantling of the volunteer forces and barricades.

Following the conclusion of the summer festival season, Abeysekera requested to be relieved of his duties, departing Jaffna in October 1968 ahead of taking office as Postmaster General in Colombo. He was officially succeeded as Government Agent of Jaffna on 1 January 1969 by Francis Cyril (F. C.) Pietersz.

=== Postmaster General and later life ===
In 1969, Abeysekera was appointed Postmaster General of Ceylon and Director of Telecommunications, a post he held until his retirement from public service in 1970.

Following his retirement, he emigrated to Australia, settling in Melbourne. In Australia, he hosted a weekly radio broadcast for the Sri Lankan expatriate community on Radio 3EA beginning in March 1979. In 1989, he published his memoirs, Images of Jaffna: A Government Agent's Recollections, with a foreword written by former Chief Justice N. D. M. Samarakoon.

Abeysekera died on 13 February 2005 in Burwood, Victoria, at the age of 85.

== Bibliography ==
- Abeysekera, Vernon (1989). Images of Jaffna: A Government Agent's Recollections. Pascoe Vale South, Victoria: SLAM Publishing Service. ISBN 0-7316-5344-0.
