= Tamil Nadu-Kerala dam row =

Dispute over the Mullaperiyar Dam

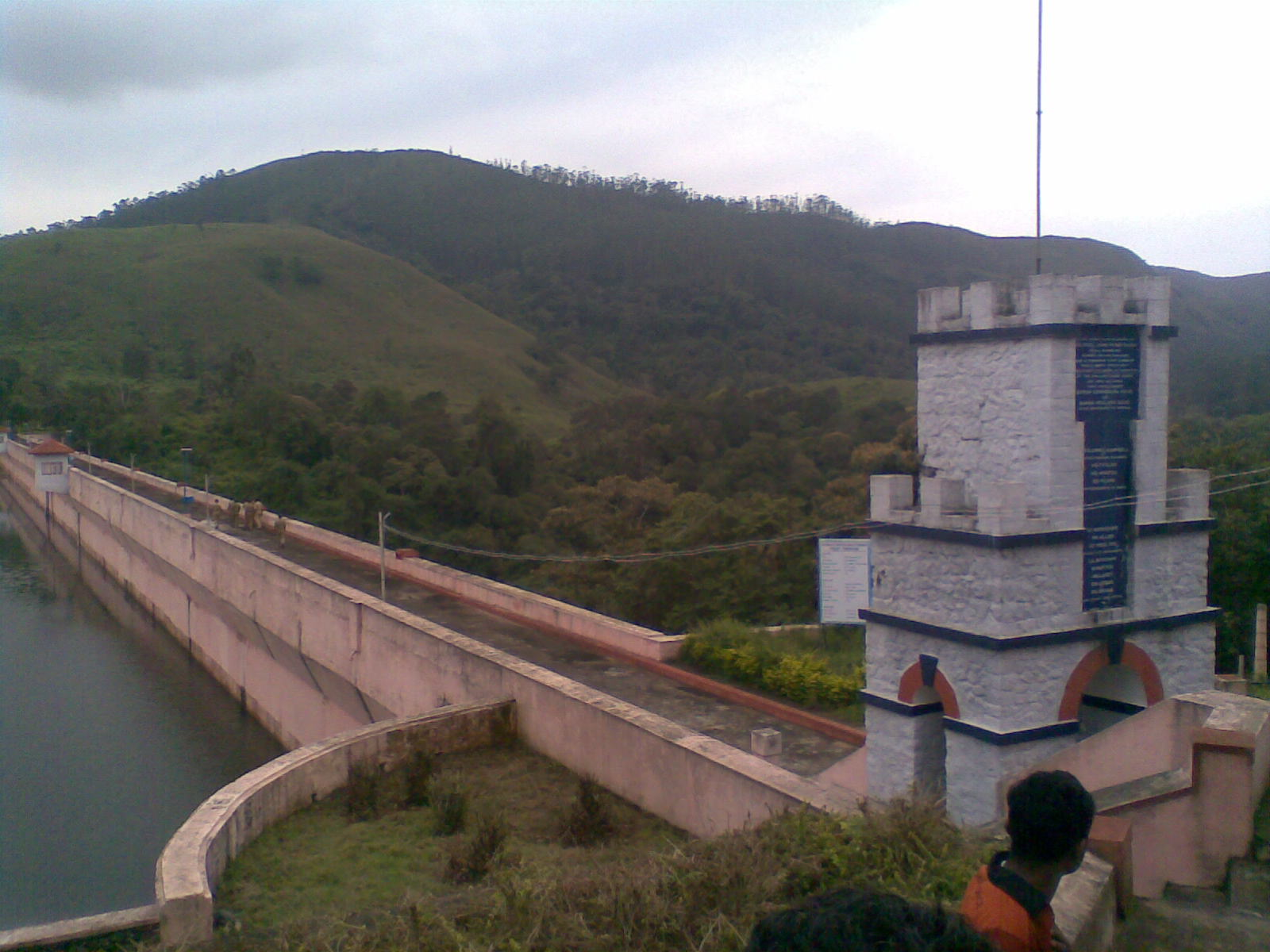
Mullaperiyar Dam

Tamil Nadu-Kerala dam row is an ongoing row and the long legal battle between the Indian states of Tamil Nadu and Kerala about the Mullaperiyar Dam on the Periyar River. Although the 127-year-old Mullaperiyar dam is located in Kerala, it is operated by the government of Tamil Nadu which signed a 999-year lease agreement with the former British government to irrigate farmland on its side. The agreement was signed by the Secretary of Madras State (now Tamil Nadu) under the British Raj and the King of Travancore. From several technical surveys conducted, Kerala states the old masonry dam built with lime surkhi mortar is structurally getting weaker and costly in leakage and massive cracks - shear maintenance in abutments above all poses a significant danger to an approximate 3 million people living in the region and that it needs to be rebuilt – a move opposed by Tamil Nadu. Tamil Nadu maintains that the endangered dam was repaired in 1979 and insists the dam's walls have been strengthened and that it can hold more water than the current level of 136 ft (41 m) and also due to the fact it only takes around 25,000 INR per year payment for an estimated usage of water for 8000 acres per British oppression era lease, this does not include how many tmc feet could be shared which is also a blissful loophole in the Mullayar-"Periyar Lease Deed of 1886" that the government is unwilling to waive. In a 1998 affidavit, the Tamil Nadu government admitted that it drew around 21 tmc ft or 594636000000 L (Five hundred ninety-four billion, six hundred thirty-six million litres) annually for around 230,000 acres. Although the Periyar River has a total catchment area of 5398 km^{2} with 114 km^{2} downstream from the dam in Tamil Nadu, the catchment area of Mullaperiyar Dam itself lies entirely in Kerala and thus its water source is not an inter-State river.

Protests, calling for Prime Minister Manmohan Singh to intervene, erupted across Kerala demanding construction of a new dam to replace Mullaperiyar Dam. These new protests were triggered by recent low-intensity earthquakes that prompted scientists to say the dam could not withstand more intensive tremors. The public and scientific consensus over the seismic vulnerability of the Mullaperiyar Dam in Kerala, and Tamil Nadu's resistance in accepting the vulnerability of the dam has strained the inter-state relationship since the 2000s.

This was followed by the chief minister of Kerala's meeting with Prime Minister Manmohan Singh to try to resolve the damaging row with neighbouring Tamil Nadu. As the row intensified, police in Kerala banned gatherings of more than five people at the dam near the Tamil Nadu border. The move was followed by clashes between people from the two states near the town of Kumali. In the country's capital, Members of Parliament from Kerala and Tamil Nadu clashed in India's upper house of parliament over the issue. However, the issue is at large in multiple dimensions like water shortage, right to protection, etc.

Thousands of people of Kerala formed a 208 km human wall in the following day to demand a replacement to the dam although Tamil Nadu insists it is safe and that water levels can be raised. The protest was led by the opposition Left Democratic Front (LDF) in which politicians, social activists and families along the way took part. The central government has invited senior officials from both states to discuss the issue later in December 2011.

In May 2014, Supreme Court of India ruled that the water level in the dam can be increased from 136 ft to 142 ft. It also struck down Kerala Irrigation Water Conservation Act and constituted a permanent Supervisory Committee to oversee all the issues concerning Mullaperiyar dam.

In a UN report published in 2021, the dam was identified as one among the world's big dams which needs to be decommissioned for being 'situated in a seismically active area with significant structural flaws and poses risk to 3.5 million people in the 100+ years old dam were to fail'.

== Interstate dispute ==
For Tamil Nadu, Mullaperiyar dam and the diverted Periyar waters act as a source for Theni, Madurai, Dindigul, Sivagangai and Ramanathapuram districts, providing water for irrigation, drinking and also for the generation of power in Lower Periyar Power Station. Tamil Nadu has insisted on exercising its unfettered rights to control the dam and its waters, based on the 1866 lease agreement. Kerala has pointed out the unfairness in the 1886 lease agreement and has challenged the validity of this agreement. However, safety concerns posed by the 116-year-old dam to the safety of the people of Kerala in the event of a dam collapse, have been the focus of disputes from 2009 onward. Kerala's proposal for decommissioning the dam and construction of a new dam on the basis of environmental and life-threatening risk it possesses has been challenged by Tamil Nadu.

Tamil Nadu has insisted on raising the water level in the dam to 142 feet, pointing outcrop failures. One estimate maintains that "the crop losses to Tamil Nadu, because of the reduction in the height of the dam, between 1980 and 2005 is a whopping ₹ 40,000 crores. In the process the farmers of the erstwhile rain shadow areas in Tamil Nadu who had started a thrice-yearly cropping pattern had to go back to the bi-annual cropping."

The Kerala Government states that this is not true and the objections raised are political than for welfare. During the year 1979–80 the gross area cultivated in Periyar command area was 171,307 acres (693.25 km^{2}). After the lowering of the level to 136 ft (41 m), the gross irrigated area increased and in 1994–95 it reached 229,718 acres (929.64 km^{2}). The Tamil Nadu government had increased its withdrawal from the reservoir, with additional facilities to cater to the increased demand from newly irrigated areas.

In 2006, the Supreme Court of India by its decision by a three-member division bench, allowed for the storage level to be raised to 142 feet (43 m) pending completion of the proposed strengthening measures, provision of other additional vents and implementation of other suggestions.

However, the Kerala government promulgated a new "Dam Safety Act" against increasing the storage level of the dam, which has not been objected by the Supreme Court. Tamil Nadu challenged it on various grounds. The Supreme Court issued notice to Kerala to respond, however did not stay the operation of the Act even as an interim measure. The Court then advised the States to settle the matter amicably, and adjourned hearing in order to enable them to do so. The Supreme Court of India termed the act as not unconstitutional. Meanwhile, the Supreme Court constituted a Constitution bench to hear the case considering its wide ramifications.

Kerala did not object giving water to Tamil Nadu. Their main cause of objection is the dam's safety as it is as old as 110 years. Increasing the level would add more pressure to be handled by already leaking dam. Tamil Nadu wants the 2006 order of Supreme court be implemented so as to increase the water level to 142 feet (43 m).

In May 2014, Supreme Court of India declared Kerala Irrigation and Water Conservation (Amendment) Act, 2006 as unconstitutional and allowed Tamil Nadu to raise water level from 136 ft to 142 ft and also formed a permanent Supervisory Committee to take care of the issues relating to the dam.

== Justice A.S. Anand Committee (Empowered Committee) ==
On 18 February 2010, the Supreme Court decided to constitute a five-member empowered committee to study all the issues of Mullaperiyar Dam and seek a report from it within six months. The Bench in its draft order said Tamil Nadu and Kerala would have the option to nominate a member each, who could be either a retired judge or a technical expert. The five-member committee will be headed by former Chief Justice of India A. S. Anand to go into all issues relating to the dam's safety and the storage level. However, the then ruling party of Tamil Nadu, DMK, passed a resolution that not only opposes the apex court's decision to form the five-member committee but also said that the state government will not nominate any member to it.

The then Tamil Nadu Chief Minister M. Karunanidhi said that immediately after the Supreme Court announced its decision to set up a committee, he had written to the Congress Party president asking the Centre to mediate between Kerala and Tamil Nadu on Mullaperiyar issue. However, the then Leader of Opposition i.e., the Ex-Chief Minister of Tamil Nadu J. Jayalalithaa objected to the TN Government move. She said that this would give an advantage to Kerala in the issue. Meanwhile, Kerala Water Resources Minister N. K. Premachandran told the state Assembly that the State should have the right of construction, ownership, operation and maintenance of the new dam while giving water to Tamil Nadu on the basis of a clear cut agreement. He also informed the media that Former Supreme Court Judge Mr. K. T. Thomas will represent Kerala on the expert panel constituted by Supreme Court.

On 8 March 2010, Tamil Nadu told the Supreme Court that it was not interested in adjudicating the dispute with Kerala before the special "empowered" committee appointed by the apex court for settling the inter-State issue. However, Supreme Court refused to accept Tamil Nadu's request to scrap the decision to form the empowered committee. The Supreme Court also criticized the Union Government for its reluctance in funding the empowered committee.

Implementing directions of the Supreme Court, the Central Government extended the terms of Empowered Committee for a further period of six months, namely till 30 April 2012.

In its report submitted to the Supreme Court on 25 April 2012, the committee is understood to have said: "The dam is structurally, hydrologically, and seismically safe." Last year's earth tremors in that region "did not have any impact on the Mullaperiyar dam and the Idukki reservoir and there was no danger to the safety of the two dams."

== Supervisory Committee ==
In 2014 the Supreme Court constituted a permanent Supervisory Committee to oversee all the aspects concerning Mullaperiyar dam. The Supervisory Committee consisting of three members one member from the Central Water Commission of The Water Resource Ministry who will act as the chairman of the Supervisory Committee and two other members from the respective states. The Supervisory Committee will also have a Sub Committee under it consisting of five engineer members headed by engineer from Central Water Commission and two other members from the respective states of Tamil Nadu and Kerala.

== Construction of a new dam ==
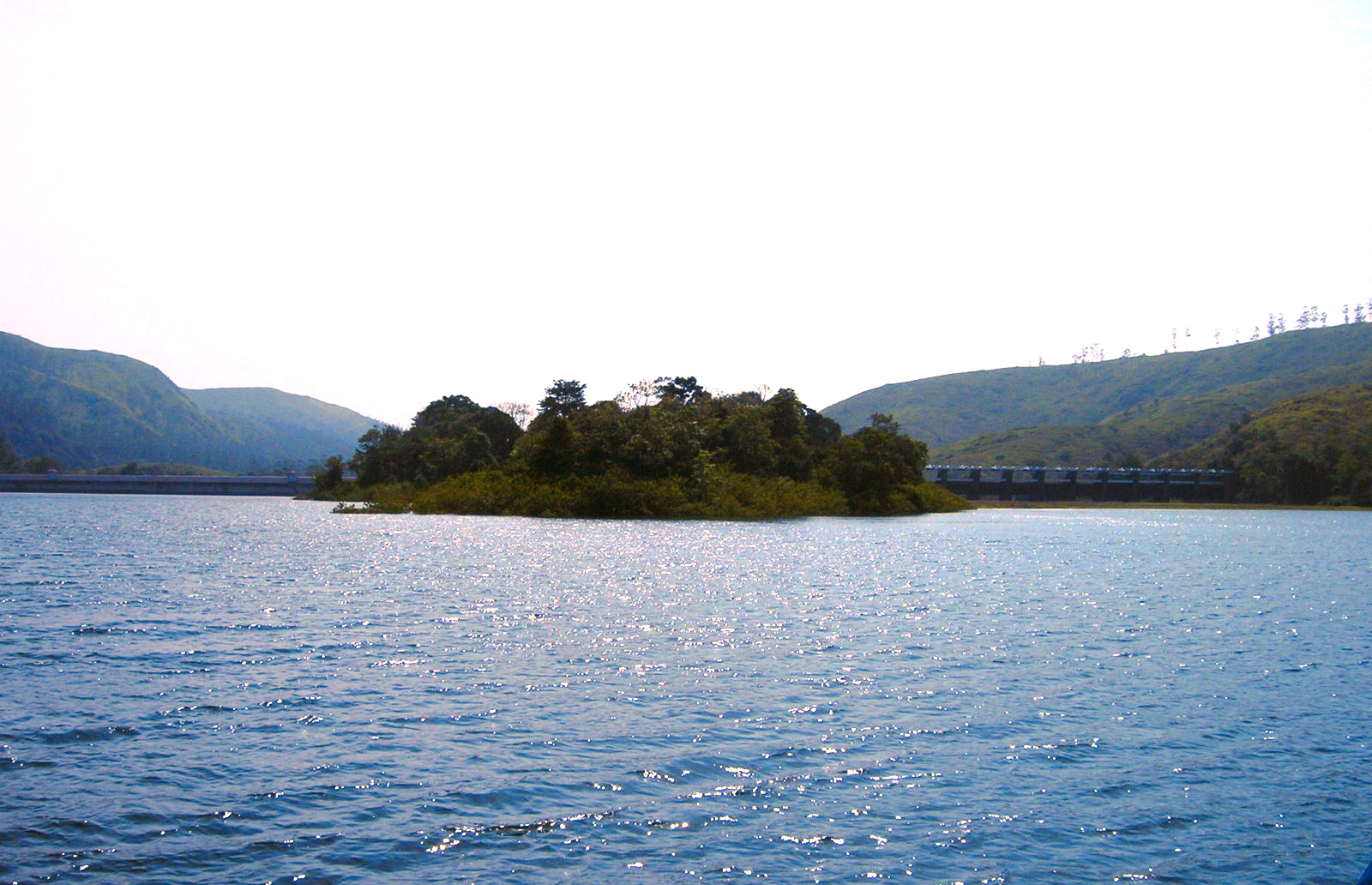
Mullaperiyar reservoir

Kerala enacted the Kerala Irrigation and Water Conservation (Amendment) Act, 2006 to ensure safety of all 'endangered' dams in the State, listed in the second schedule to the Act. Section 62A of the Act provides for listing in the schedule, "details of the dams which are endangered on account of their age, degeneration, degradation, structural or other impediments as are specified". The second schedule to the Act lists Mullaperiyar (dam) constructed in 1895 and fixes 136 feet as its maximum water level. The Act empowers Kerala Dam Safety Authority (Authority specified in the Act) to oversee safety of dams in the State and sec 62(e) empowers the Authority to direct the custodian (of a dam) "to suspend the functioning of any dam, to decommission any dam or restrict the functioning of any dam if public safety or threat to human life or property, so require". The Authority can conduct periodical inspection of any dam listed in the schedules.

In pursuance of Kerala's dam safety law declaring Mullaperiyar dam as an endangered dam, in September 2009, the Ministry of Environment and Forests of Government of India granted environmental clearance to Kerala for conducting survey for new dam downstream. Tamil Nadu approached Supreme Court for a stay order against the clearance; however, the plea was rejected. Consequently, the survey was started in October, 2009. Later strengthening the dam's previously fractured areas was inspected. Kerala Govt has communicated with the Central Govt and Tamil Nadu for extension of the project and for preparing and acquiring modern and scientific plans with all possible factors tabulated.

In 2014 while passing the final judgement the Supreme Court has laid down criteria for any future construction of new dam downstream the present Mullaperiyar Dam under the "Way Forward - Towards an amicable solution" or a tunnel solution as suggested by the Empowered Committee.

After suggesting the proposals the Supreme Court in its 2014 final verdict stated "we however grant liberty to the parties to apply to the Court if they are able to arrive at some amicable solution on either of the two alternatives suggested by the Empowered Committee"

== In popular culture ==
- Malayalam movie L2: Empuraan shows fictional depiction of Mullaperiyar Dam and the villain trying to sabotage the dam facility by planting bombs. Further it portrayed that the collapse of the dam would result in washing away a significant part of Kerala. The film also criticised about 999 years lease deed of the dam before the independence through which the Tamilnadu operate the dam which is in Kerala.

== See also ==
- 1979 Machchhu dam failure
- Mullaperiyar dam
- Kaveri River water dispute
- Ravi-Beas dispute
- Godavari Water Disputes Tribunal
- Narmada dispute
- Sutlej Yamuna link canal
