= Arthur Sampson Pagden =

English civil servant

- Born: 9 December 1858; Batheaston, Somerset
- Died: 16 July 1942 (aged 83); Exmouth, Devon
- Education: Wellington College, Berkshire
- Alma mater: King's College, Cambridge
- Occupations: Military officer, public servant
- Known for: Postmaster General of Ceylon
- Term: 1913 – 1923
- Predecessor: Henry Luttrell Moysey
- Successor: Francis Jagoe Smith
- Spouse: Frances Emma Beatrice James (m. 1900)
- Children: Norman Jagoe

Arthur Sampson Pagden CMG (9 December 1858 – 16 July 1942) was an English civil servant, who was employed in the Ceylon Civil Service for forty years, between 1881 and 1920. During which time was elected as the Mayor of Colombo (1901–1905) and appointed as the Principal Assistant Colonial Secretary (1905–1906), the Postmaster General of Ceylon (1906–1913) and the Controller of Revenue (1913–1920).

Arthur Sampson Pagden was born on 9 December 1858 in Batheaston, Somerset, the oldest child of nine children, to Robert Pagden (1824–1893), a brewer from Epsom, Surrey, and Catherine Sampson née Pagden (1835–1895), Robert's first cousin. Pagden received his secondary education at Wellington College, Berkshire (1873–1877) and went on to study at King's College, Cambridge, where he received a Bachelor of Arts in 1881.

In December 1880 he was made a Lieutenant in the 2nd Cambridgeshire Rifle Volunteer Corps and in 1883 served in Ceylon as part of the Ceylon Light Infantry.

On 7 June 1900 Pagden married Frances Emma Beatrice James (1861–1948), daughter of Kenneth Haweis James (1835–1914), an English metal-broker and Emma Louisa née Pinero (1834–1883).

In April 1901 he was elected as the Chairman of the Colombo Municipal Council and Mayor of Colombo, a position he retained for four years until February 1905. He was then appointed as the Principal Assistant Colonial Secretary for a year. In 1906 he was appointed as the Postmaster General of Ceylon and Director of Telegraphs and served in that role for seven years. In 1913 he was appointed the Controller of Revenue, was made a member of the Executive Council of Ceylon and the Legislative Council of Ceylon (1913–1920) and also acted as Colonial Secretary of Ceylon on several occasions (1916, 1918 and 1919) during the absence of Sir Reginald Edward Stubbs, retiring in 1920.

He was awarded a Companion of the Order of St Michael and St George in the 1917 New Year Honours list, for his work as Controller of Revenue, Island of Ceylon.

Upon his retirement he returned to England, where he was one of the early members of the Oriental Club. Pagden died on 16 July 1942 in Exmouth, Devon, at the age of 83. His wife, Frances, died on 12 September 1948 in Minehead, Somerset.

Government offices
Preceded by Henry Luttrell Moysey	Postmaster General of Ceylon; 1906–1913	Succeeded by Francis Jagoe Smith
