= John Pennycuick (British Army officer, born 1789) =

British Army officer in Asia

Brigadier-General John Pennycuick CB KH
- Born: 28 October 1789
- Died: 13 January 1849 (aged 59) Chillianwala, Punjab, India

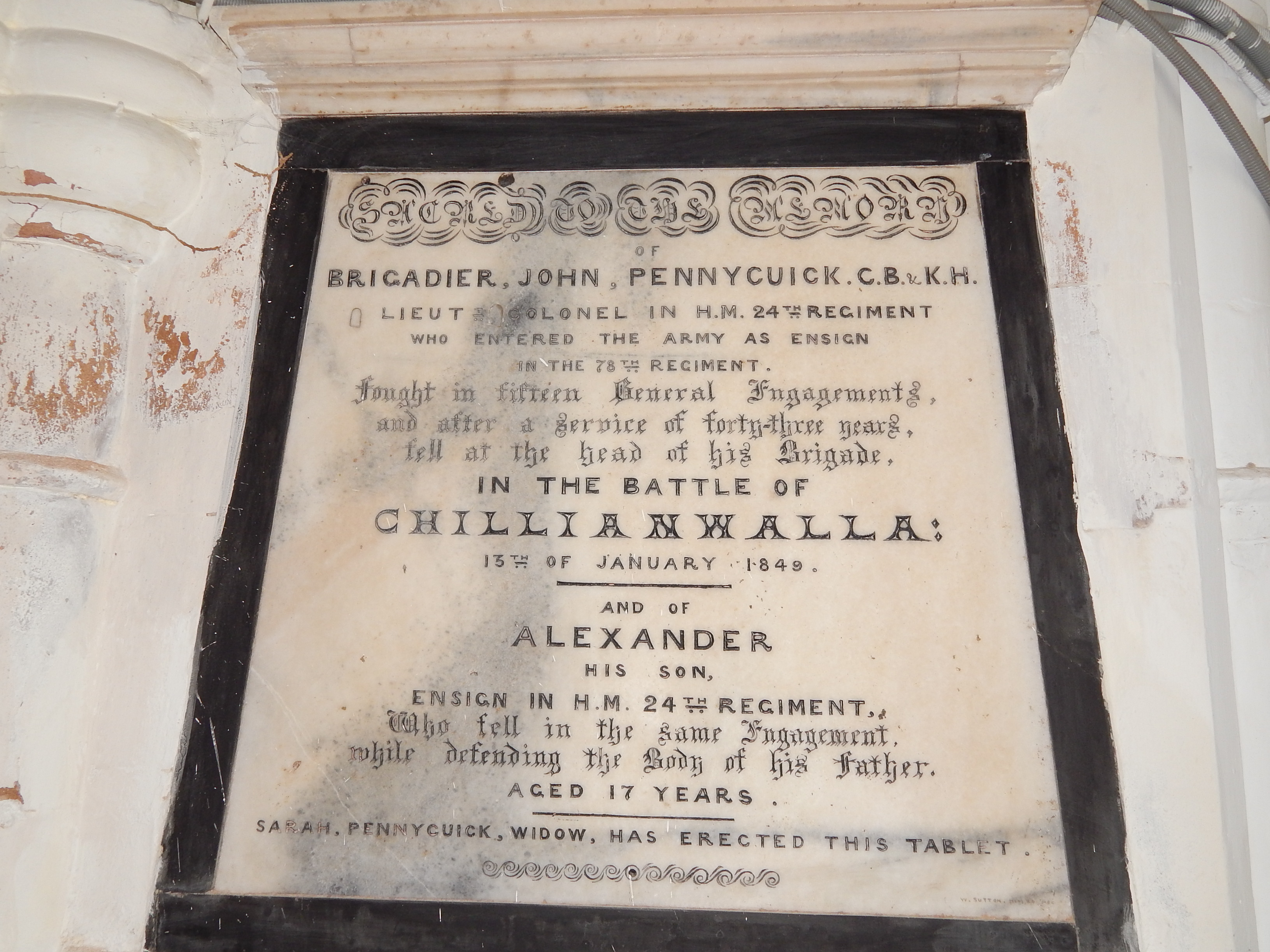
Plaque erected by Sarah Pennycuick, widow of Brigadier John Pennycuick and mother of Alexander of the 24th Regiment, both of whom died in Battle of Chillianwala on 13 January 1849.

Brigadier-General John Pennycuick CB KH (28 October 1789 – 13 January 1849) was an officer in the British Army who served in Java, Burma, Aden, Afghanistan and India. He was born in Soilzarie in Perthshire and was killed at the Battle of Chillianwalla in the Second Anglo-Sikh War.

== Early military career ==
Pennycuick joined the Edinburgh militia as an ensign in 1806, and entered the regular army the following year as an ensign in the 78th (Highlanders) Regiment of Foot. He served in the Java Expedition in 1811, and was wounded in the siege of the fort at Meester Cornelis. He was promoted to the rank of lieutenant in 1812 and captain in 1821. He exchanged into the 47th Regiment of Foot in 1825 and fought in the First Anglo-Burmese War in 1825 to 1826.

== Promotion to major ==
He was promoted to major in 1834, but without a regimental posting, but joined the 17th Regiment of Foot as a major the following year. He became a Knight of the Royal Guelphic Order in 1837, and served in the First Anglo-Afghan War in 1839, including the Battle of Ghazni. He commanded the storming party in the capture of the Baluchi tribal fortress of Kalat on 13 November 1839. For his actions, he was promoted to brevet lieutenant-colonel in 1840, and was made a Commander of the Order of the Bath. He was promoted to the substantive rank of lieutenant-colonel in 1840, and served near Aden in 1841.

== Second Anglo-Sikh War ==
He exchanged from the 17th Regiment to the 24th Regiment of Foot in 1848. Later that year, he commanded a brigade in the Second Anglo-Sikh War, composed of the 24th Regiment and Bengal Native infantry battalions, in the 3rd Division commanded by Major General Joseph Thackwell (later by Sir Colin Campbell). His brigade led the attack ordered by Lord Gough at the Battle of Chillianwalla on 13 January 1849. After rushing forward without firing to seize the Sikh guns, the 24th Regiment lost touch with the rest of their brigade and was left exposed to enemy fire from the surrounding jungle. The 24th was driven back, and lost its Queen's Colour. Pennycuick and Lieutenant-Colonel Brooks of the 24th Regiment were killed, along with 20 other officers and 497 other ranks, including Pennycuick's 17-year-old son, who was serving as an ensign.

== Family ==
He had married Sarah Farrell, daughter of the vicar of Rathcline, County Longford, in 1820. They had five sons and six daughters. His eldest surviving son, James Farrell Pennycuick, joined the British Army, serving in the Crimea and the Indian Mutiny, and retired as a full general. A younger son, Colonel John Pennycuick, became a British Army engineer and civil servant who also served in India. His son Alexander fell in the Battle of Chillianwala at the age 17, while defending the body of his father. His youngest son, Charles Edward Ducat Pennycuick, served as the Mayor of Colombo, the Postmaster General of Ceylon and the Treasurer of Ceylon. His grandson, John Pennycuick, was an English barrister and judge. His eldest daughter, Ruth Pennycuick married Scottish grazier and pastoralist Reset Bruce Gill, brother of Astronomer Sir David Gill.
