= Herbert Webb Gillman =

- Born: 18 May 1832; Coachford, County Cork, Ireland
- Died: 23 July 1898 (aged 66); Coachford, County Cork, Ireland
- Resting place: Magourney Church, Coachford
- Occupations: public servant; antiquarian; historian
- Known for: Postmaster General of Ceylon
- Term: 1867 - 1871
- Predecessor: William Barton
- Successor: Thomas Edward Barnes Skinner
- Spouse: Annie Mackwood
- Children: Herbert Francis; Webb; Frances Hetty
- Parent(s): Herbert; Esther née Bennett

Herbert Webb Gillman (18 May 1832 - 23 July 1898) was a Ceylonese Judge, the Postmaster General of Ceylon between 1867 and 1871 and an Irish historian.

Herbert Webb Gillman was born on 18 May 1832 in Coachford, County Cork, the only son of Herbert (1791-1877) and Esther née Bennett (1795-1842), third daughter of John Barter Bennett, a surgeon from Cork. His mother died when he was ten and in 1847 his father remarried Sarah Honeywood Pollock Skottowe Parker, the third daughter of Richard Neville Parker.

Gillman undertook his tertiary studies at Trinity College Dublin, where he received a gold medal in mathematics and graduated with a Bachelor of Arts in 1853. He was admitted to Lincoln's Inn, and was called to the bar on 26 January 1897. Whilst reading for a fellowship at Trinity College, he was offered and accepted a post in the Ceylon Civil Service, where he remained for some twenty years. During his tenure he served as Postmaster General (1867); District Judge, Galle (1872); and acting Treasurer of Ceylon, where he assisted in the decimalisation of the rupee. He also held positions on both the Legislative and Executive Councils.

In 1866 he married Annie Mackwood, second daughter of Francis Mackwood (a tea plantation owner). They had three children: Herbert Francis (1867-1918), who joined the Indian Civil Service and served as a member of the Madras Legislative Council; Webb (1870-1933) who served in several campaigns including the Second Boer War; Anglo-Aro War and World War I, reaching the rank of General, receiving a KCB, KCMG and DSO for his military service; and Frances Hetty (1876-1959), who married Eyre Herbert Ievers.

He retired from public service in 1875, for health reasons, and returned to the family home in Clontead More, to reside there with his family. His father died on 2 December 1877 as did his stepmother four months later, with Gillman inheriting the entire family estate. Gillman actively pursued his interests in antiquities and local history. He was made a fellow of the Royal Society of Antiquaries; a fellow of The Bibliographical Society; and in 1892 became one of the founding members of the Cork Historical and Archaeological Society, serving as its vice-president for a number of years. He authored and co-authored a number of articles for the Cork Historical and Archaeological Society, and became a leading authority on castles and tower houses in County Cork.

Gillman died on 23 July 1898, at the age of 66, and is buried in the graveyard at the Magourney Church in Coachford.

== Bibliography ==
- Gillman, Herbert Webb (1892). "Carrignamuck Castle, County Cork: a stronghold of the MacCarthys". Journal of the Cork Historical and Archaeological Society. I: 30–37.
- Gillman, Herbert Webb (1892). "Sir Cormac McTeige MacCarthy and the sept lands of Muskerry, Co. Cork; with a historical pedigree". Journal of the Cork Historical and Archaeological Society. I: 193–200.
- Gillman, Herbert Webb (1892). "Castlemore, and connected castles in Muskerry, Co. Cork". Journal of the Cork Historical and Archaeological Society. I: 213–220, 233–242.
- Gillman, Herbert Webb (1893). "Cloghan Castle, in Carbery, Co. Cork, identified. With map and sketch of its history". Journal of the Cork Historical and Archaeological Society. II: 173–179.
- Lyons, John Rev.; Gillman, Herbert Webb (1895). "Togher Castle and district, Co. Cork". Journal of the Cork Historical and Archaeological Society. I: 481–497.
- Gillman, Herbert Webb (1895). "Siege of Rathbarry Castle, 1642". Journal of the Cork Historical and Archaeological Society. I: 1–20.
- Gillman, Herbert Webb (1895). "The rise and progress in Munster of the Rebellion, 1642". Journal of the Cork Historical and Archaeological Society. I: 529–42.
- Gillman, Herbert Webb (1896). "Muskerry yeomanry, Co. Cork, and their times". Journal of the Cork Historical and Archaeological Society. II: 193–209, 241–250.
- Gillman, Herbert Webb (1896). "Index to the Marriage Licence Bonds of the Diocese of Cork and Ross". Journal of the Cork Historical and Archaeological Society. II: 287–288.
- Gillman, Herbert Francis; Gillman, Herbert Webb (1897). "The castle of Dundanier, miscalled Dundaniel, near Inish-annon, Co. Cork". Journal of the Cork Historical and Archaeological Society. III: 315–328.

Government offices
Preceded by William Barton	Postmaster General of Ceylon; 1867–1871	Succeeded by Thomas Edward Barnes Skinner
