= George Lee (postmaster) =

Postmaster General of Ceylon
- In office 1844–1859
- Preceded by: George William Stewart
- Succeeded by: William Barton

Personal details
- Born: George A. Lee; 1831
- Died: 14 September 1860 (aged 28–29) Frogmore, Guernsey
- Spouse: Martha née Austin (m.1841)
- Children: Lionel Frederick; Henry Austin; Gertrude Fanny
- Occupation: public servant

George Lee (1831 – 14 September 1860) was the first Superintendent of the Government Printing Office in Ceylon, between 1833 and 1835 and the Postmaster General of Ceylon between 1844 and 1859.

Lee was a highly accomplished literary man, son of an Amsterdam merchant, who traveled to Ceylon in October 1831, as a member of Sir Robert Wilmot-Horton's staff. Wilmot-Horton served as the Governor of Ceylon between 1831 and 1837.

The Colombo Journal was published on 1 January 1832 and printed at the Government Press, with Lee as its editor. Lee was the Superintendent of the Government Press at that time. The newspaper was closed by the Colonial Office on 31 December 1833, following its criticism of the British government. Lee was succeeded as Superintendent by Lieutenant Colonel Grey in 1835.

On 3 May 1837 the first issue of a new English newspaper Ceylon Chronicle was published. The first editor of this paper was Rev. Samuel Owen Glenie, the Colonial Chaplain and later Archdeacon of Colombo. When the Bishop of India objected to this appointment Lee was appointed as editor. The newspaper was short-lived and ceased publication on 3 September 1838.

In 1847 using his position as the former Superintendent of the Government Printing Office, he prepared and printed an English translation by Joachim Le Grand of João Ribeiro's History of Ceylon. He also acted as the Colonial Auditor-General on two occasions. He retired from the Ceylon Civil Service on 1 September 1859 and returned to England.

Lee married Martha Austin, daughter of James Austin and Sophia née Hill, at St. Paul's Church, Kandy, on 2 October 1841. They had several children including, Lionel Frederick (1845-1899), who served as the Treasurer of Ceylon; Henry Austin KCMG, CB (1847-1918), who served in the British Diplomatic Service; and Gertrude Fanny (1849-1911), who married Charles Pickering Hayley (the founder of Hayleys).

Lee died at his residence, Frogmore, on Guernsey, Channel Islands on 14 September 1860, at the age of 61.

Government offices
Preceded by George William Stewart	Postmaster General of Ceylon; 1833–1859	Succeeded by William Barton
