= Henry Luttrell Moysey =

English colonial administrator

Henry Luttrell Moysey ISO

Postmaster General of Ceylon
- In office 1900 - 1936
- Preceded by: Charles Edward Ducat Pennycuick
- Succeeded by: Arthur Sampson Pagden

Personal details
- Born: 10 December 1849 Wiveliscombe, Somerset, England
- Died: 15 August 1918 (aged 68) Bexhill-on-Sea, Sussex, England
- Spouse: Dora Kathleen O'Grady (m. 1875)
- Children: Frederick James; Edward Luttrell; Mary Gertrude;
- Parent(s): Frederick Luttrell Moysey; Arabella Ward
- Education: Cheltenham College
- Occupation: public servant

Henry Luttrell Moysey ISO (10 December 1849 – 15 August 1918) was an English colonial administrator who was the ninth Postmaster General of Ceylon and Director of Telegraphs, serving from 1900–06.

Moysey was born in Wiveliscombe, Somerset, the youngest of six children and third son of Rev. Frederick Luttrell Moysey (1815–1906) and Arabella Ward (1818–1903). He was the grandson of the Hon. Edward Ward; Rev. Charles Moysey, Archdeacon of Bath; and the great-grandson of Earl of Darnley; Viscount Bangor; and Abel Moysey, M.P. for Bath.

He studied at Cheltenham College and entered the Ceylon Civil Service in September 1870. Moysey was appointed as the Police Magistrate, Kayts (1872); Assistant Government Agent, Kurunegala (1973); Assistant Government Agent, Batticaloa (1873); Assistant to the Government Agent, Northwestern Province (1876); Police Magistrate, Kandy (1877); Assistant Government Agent, Matale (1878); District Judge, Kurunegala (1891); Government Agent, Sabaragamuwa Province (1897); Principal Collector of Customs (1898) and Postmaster General and Director of Telegraphs (1900-1906).

Moysey married Dora Kathleen O'Grady, the daughter of William Hervey O'Grady JP (a coconut plantation owner) on 23 November 1875 in Batticaloa, Ceylon. They had three children: Frederick James (1876-1960); Edward Luttrell (1877-1970); Mary Gertrude (1879-1965).

On 13 March 1888, Moysey was made a fellow of the Royal Colonial Institute. In August 1899 he was appointed as an official member of the Legislative Council of Ceylon, following his assignation as Principal Collector of Customs. Moysey identified himself with the welfare of the local population, particularly the development of native agriculture and increasing the island's food supplies. During his tenure as Postmaster General he oversaw the re-construction of the telephone system and exchanges, the introduction of a new mail sorting system, construction of additional post offices, and a significant expansion of the overland telegraph system throughout the island.

On 29 May 1903, he was awarded the Imperial Service Order. Upon retiring from the position as Postmaster General on 23 August 1906 he returned to England, settling in Bexhill-on-Sea, Sussex. He was made a Fellow of the Royal Colonial Institute. He died at his residence, Creswell House, in 1918.

Government offices
Preceded by Charles Edward Ducat Pennycuick	Postmaster General of Ceylon; 1900–1906	Succeeded by Arthur Sampson Pagden
