= Maurice Salvador Sreshta =

Indian politician

- Born: Maurice Salvador Pinto; 22 September 1872; Coimbatore, India
- Died: 6 July 1952 (aged 79); Madras, India
- Education: St. Joseph’s College, Trichinopoly; Presidency College, Madras
- Occupation: public servant
- Known for: Postmaster General of Ceylon
- Term: 1923–1928
- Predecessor: Francis Jagoe Smith
- Successor: H. A. Burden
- Spouse: Lucy Saldanha
- Children: Hermione Amy Juliana Sita (1910); Maurice Alexis (1911); Austin Thomas Sanjiva (1913); Noel John (1917); Eric Francis Ranjan (1918); Reginald Louis Sundar (1922); Henry Joseph Manohar (1925)
- Parent(s): Diwan Bahadur Alexio Pinto; Martha Maria née Vas

Maurice Salvador Sreshta (22 September 1872 – 6 July 1952) served as the Postmaster General of Ceylon from 1923 to 1928.

Maurice Salvador Sreshta was born on 22 September 1872 in Coimbatore, India, the third son and fourth of seven children to Dewan Bahadur Alexio Pinto (a government civil servant) and Martha Maria née Vas. He was educated at St. Joseph's College, Trichinopoly, and then at Presidency College, Madras, before travelling to England where he successfully competed for the Colonial Civil Service in October 1896. He studied law at the Middle Temple and was called to the bar on 26 January 1897. He took a position in Ceylon, arriving 24 February 1897. He studied law at the Middle Temple and was called to the bar on 26 January 1897. He took a position in Ceylon, arriving 24 February 1897. He legally changed his last name from Pinto to Sreshta (Sreshta being Nepalese for "the best"). Sreshta held numerous positions including Assistant to the Government Agent, Eastern Province (1898); Additional Police Magistrate, Tangalle (1900); Police Magistrate, Panadure (1900) Police Magistrate, Advisewella (1901); Police Magistrate, Galle (1905); Commissioner of Requests, Colombo (1907); District Judge, Jaffna (1911); District Judge, Negombo (1917); District Judge, Kurunegala (1920); and Registrar General.

In February 1923, Sreshta reached the culmination of his career when he was appointed as Postmaster General of Ceylon, the first non-European to attain this position. During his tenure he re-organised the postal system, established the first rural telephone exchange, and motorised the mail services thereby expediting the conveyance of mail all over the country. In 1928 following his retirement, he returned to Mangalore, where in 1929 he was elected vice-chairman of the Mangalore Municipality and then in February 1932 as a member of the Madras Legislative Council, as the Indian Christian nominee, representing the Justice Party. He lost his seat at the subsequent election in January 1937. Sreshta was an active member of various Catholic bodies and for a number of years served as the editor of the community magazine, Mangalore.

Shreshta married Lucy Saldanha (1892–1960), the daughter of Sylvester S. S. Saldanha and Christine née Mascarenhas. They had seven children. He died on 6 July 1952, at age 79, in Madras.

== See also ==
- L. P. Fernandes. The Political & Civic Work of M. S. Sreshta, MLC, BA, CCS (Rtd), Bar-at-Law. Konkani Institute, Mangalore.

Government offices
Preceded by Francis Jagoe Smith	Postmaster General of Ceylon; 1923–1928	Succeeded by H. A. Burden
