= Kenneth Pennycuick =

British philatelist

Dr. Kenneth Pennycuick (28 May 1911 – 16 January 1995) was a British philatelist who was added to the Roll of Distinguished Philatelists in 1980. He was president and later chairman of the Society of Postal Historians.

Pennycuick was a specialist in the philately of East Africa.
