= William Barton (postmaster) =

British soldier and public servant

- Born: c. 1796
- Died: 14 May 1874 (aged 78); St. Helier, Jersey
- Occupations: Soldier, public servant
- Known for: Postmaster General of Ceylon
- Term: 1859 – 1867
- Predecessor: George Lee
- Successor: Herbert Webb Gillman

Captain William Barton JP (c. 1796 – 14 May 1874) was a British soldier and a Ceylonese public servant, the fifth Postmaster General of Ceylon (1859–1867).

In 1811 Barton was gazetted as an ensign in the 87th (The Prince of Wales's Irish) Regiment of Foot and in 1813 was transferred to the 1st Regiment of Foot Guards, where he was promoted to Lieutenant and Captain in 1815. He served in the Napoleonic Wars and was wounded in the Battle of Quatre Bras. In 1826 he participated in the British expedition to Portugal in the First Miguelist War, under the command of General Sir William Henry Clinton. He resigned his commission from the military in July 1833.

In 1843 he was employed in the Ceylon Commissioner of Roads' department, entering the Ceylon Civil Service on 11 October 1845, where he was appointed the Police magistrate in Matara, the acting assistant Government agent in Matara in 1847, the Police magistrate in Negombo in 1847, the acting assistant Government agent and Police magistrate in Kegalle in 1854, district judge in Ratnapura in 1854 and assistant Government agent in Matara in 1856. In September 1859 he was appointed as the Postmaster General of Ceylon, retiring on 16 May 1867.

Barton died at St. Helier, Jersey on 14 May 1874, at the age of 78.

Government offices
Preceded by George Lee	Postmaster General of Ceylon; 1859–1867	Succeeded by Herbert Webb Gillman
