= John Pennycuick (engineer) =

British Army engineer and civil servant

Colonel John Pennycuick CSI
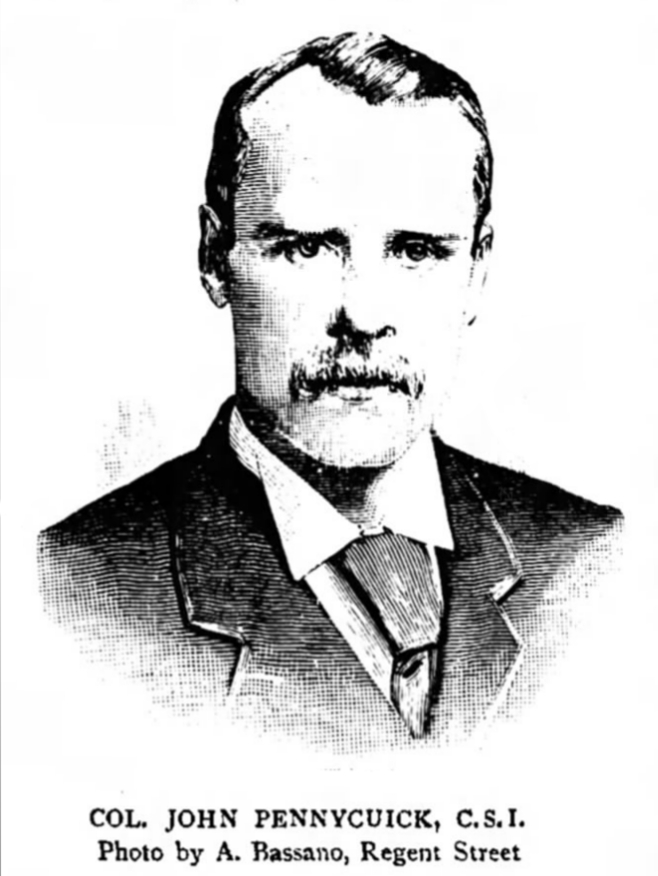
- Pennycuick in 1895
- Born: 15 January 1841; Poona, India
- Died: 9 March 1911 (aged 70); Camberley, Surrey, England

Colonel John Pennycuick CSI (15 January 1841 – 9 March 1911) was an Indian-born British Army engineer and civil servant who served as a member of the Madras Legislative Council. He undertook several irrigation works which included the masonry dam of Mullaperiyar on the Periyar River.

== Early life ==
Pennycuick was born on 15 January 1841 at Poona, a younger son of Brigadier-General John Pennycuick from Perthshire and his wife, Sarah. His father and his eldest brother, Alexander, fought and died at the Battle of Chillianwalla in 1849. He was educated at Cheltenham College.

== Career ==
Pennycuick entered the East India Company Military College at Addiscombe, Surrey, in 1857, and was commissioned as a lieutenant in the Madras Engineer Group in December 1858. He arrived in India on 11 November 1860. He commanded H company of the Madras Sappers at Zoulla during the Abyssinian campaign of 1868 and received the Abyssinian War Medal for participation in the expedition. After promotion to Second Captain in 1870 and Major in 1876, Pennycuick became a Lieutenant-Colonel in December 1883 and a Colonel in December 1887. On 10 October 1895 the Queen appointed him a Companion of the Order of the Star of India. He served in the Public Works Department until January 1896. During his six years of service in the PWD, Pennycuick served as chief engineer in the construction of the Mullaperiyar Dam.

Pennycuick was nominated to the Madras Legislative Council in November 1893. He was the last president of the Royal Indian Engineering College at Coopers Hill. He also held the position of President of the Sanitary Board and was a faculty in the University of Madras. He received a Telford medal from the Institution of Civil Engineers. The Australian government sought his advice for avoiding damage from flooding of the Brisbane River in 1899. He was a keen cricketer who played for Cheltenham College, Marylebone Cricket Club and the Madras Cricket Club. His single appearance at Lord's against Somerset in 1883 is considered first class. Arthur Haygarth records in Scores and Biographies that Pennycuick was a "good batsman" and bowled "occasionally middle-paced and round-armed".

== Mullaperiyar Dam ==
Pennycuick decided to divert the west-flowing Periyar River's culmination in the Arabian Sea towards the East so that it could irrigate hundreds of thousands of acres of dry land depending only on Vaigai River.

Pennycuick went ahead with the construction of the dam in spite of dangerous diseases and insects, as well as relentless storms. Large numbers of sand bags kept for the construction of the dam were destroyed due to severe flood. Since he could not get adequate funds from the British government, Pennycuick went to England and sold his family property to mobilise money to fund the project. The dam was completed in 1895.

The dam was inaugurated by Lord Wenlock, the then Governor of the Madras Presidency. It resulted in irrigation of 223,000 acres in Theni, Dindigul, Madurai, Sivaganga and Ramanathapuram districts.

Pennycuick used lime and surkhi paste for construction, taking into consideration the gravitational force: this allows the dam to withstand tremors and remain strong. Pennycuick said: "I am going to be only once in this earthly world, hence I need to do some good deeds here. This deed should not be prorogue nor ignored since I am not going to be here again".

== Death ==
Pennycuick died in Camberley, Surrey, on 9 March 1911. He is buried in the Churchyard of St. Peter's Church in Frimley. The grave has a substantial granite cross and plinth. In 2018 the grave was renovated and a large granite plaque was added in commemoration of his work on the Mullaiperiyar Dam. The plaque is from the states of Kerala and Tamil Nadu in recognition of the achievement.

== Family ==
Pennycuick married Grace Georgina Chamier in 1879. Their son, Sir John Pennycuick, became an English barrister and High Court judge.

== Commemoration ==
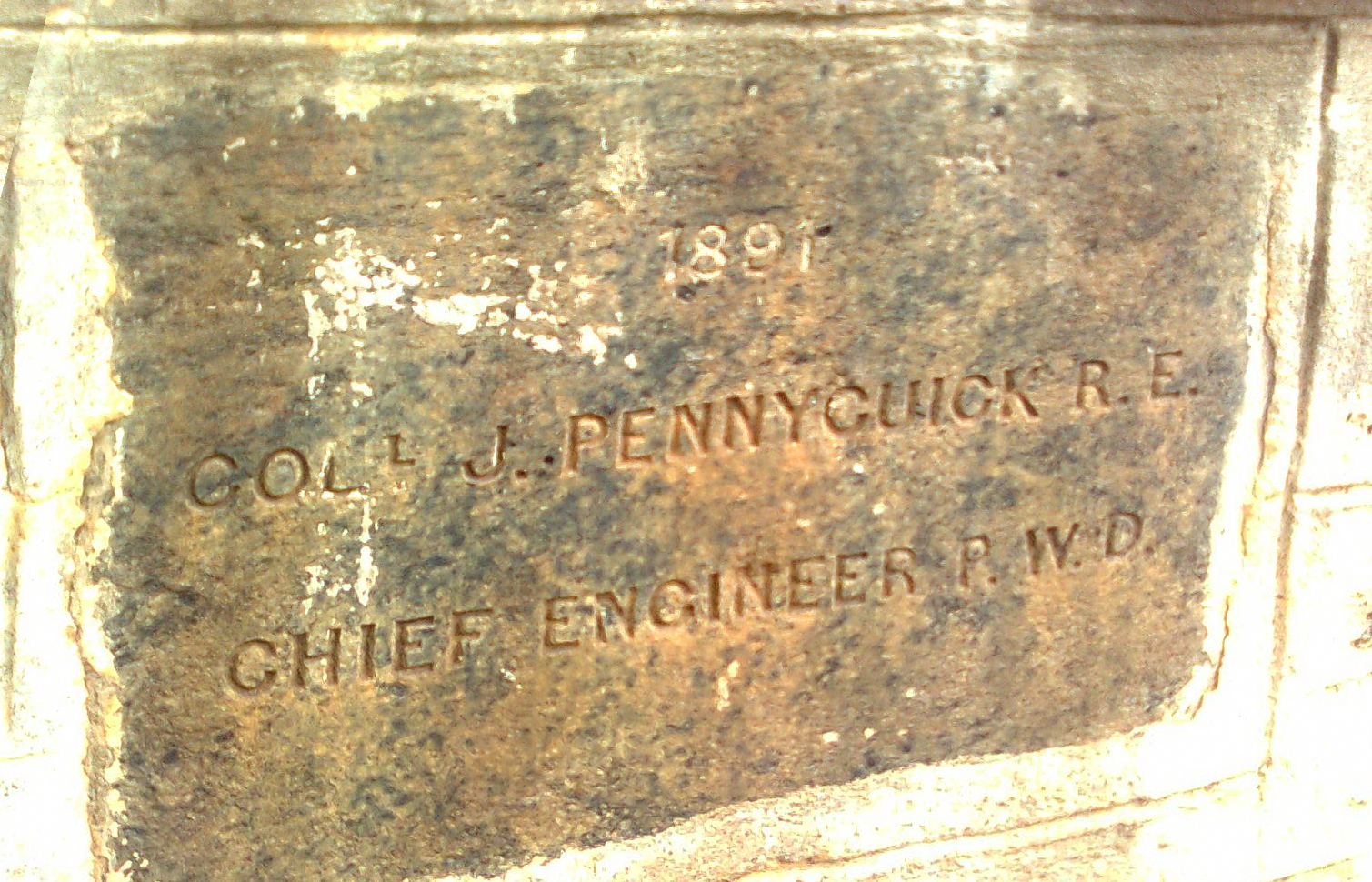
A stone plaque bearing Pennycuick's name in Vadipatti

- The Public Works Department (PWD) Office at Madurai houses a life-size bronze statue of Pennycuick. The PWD complex itself was named after Pennycuick by the state government.
- The PWD has erected four statues of Pennycuick on its premises, including a bust at the Periyar dam. The other busts are seen near the PWD Inspection Bungalow in Thekkadi and on its sub-divisional office premises at Uthamapalayam.
- Farmers of Appantirupathi unveiled a granite portrait and distributed sweets on his birth anniversary.
- A memorial to Pennycuick at the Lower Camp in Theni district was unveiled in January 2013.
- A new bus terminus in Theni was named after him in December 2013.
- At Veerapandi (East Street), Balarpatti, Kutchanoor and Kuzhiyanur in Theni district, Pennycuick is remembered during the celebration of the traditional Thai Pongal harvest festival.
- Many children in this area are named after him.
- The people of Palarpatti in Theni district venerate Pennycuick by preparing pongal in front of his statue on his birthday, which coincides with Pongal.
- Many of the farmer families of the Theni and Madurai districts still keep portraits of Pennycuick and worship him as a god. Villagers prostrate before his portrait, offer prayers, decorate with garlands and perform aarati to his photos which are usually kept in the hall or in puja room along with images of other gods.
- A white marble bust of Pennycuick was donated to his descendants by A. K. Viswanathan (Commissioner of Police, Greater Chennai Police). This statue was unveiled at St Peter's Church in Frimley on 12 January 2019 by Indian High Commission Minister A. S. Rajan.
- A bust donated from Tamil Nadu was unveiled in Camberley in September 2022.
