= Postmaster General of Sri Lanka =

Head of Sri Lanka Post

- Incumbent; Ranjith Ariyaratne since 14 August 2018
- Sri Lanka Post
- Formation: 1815
- First holder: Egbert Bletterman

The Postmaster General of Sri Lanka is the appointed head of Sri Lanka Post, which is a government department. The current Postmaster General is Ranjith Ariyaratne.

== History ==
The first mail service in Ceylon, was in 1788, established by the Dutch East India Company between Holland and Batavia via the Cape of Good Hope and Dutch Ceylon. They established postal offices in the coastal trading centres of Colombo, Galle, Jaffna and Mannar. In 1795 the Dutch were expelled by the British and the Maritime Provinces were initially administered by the British East India Company. Two years later Ceylon became a Crown Colony. In 1798, a British officer, Captain Kennedy, was appointed as a competent postal authority.

In 1815, following the signing of the Kandyan Convention the British took control of the entire country. They re-organised the postal service and a permanent post office was established in Colombo in 1882. The first official Post Master General of Ceylon was Egbert Bletterman, who was the PMG for the whole island. In 1817, Lewis Sansoni succeeded Bletterman as the second Postmaster General. The third Postmaster General was Major George Stewart and during his period he was instrumental in extending the postal services to major towns in the country.

== List of Postmasters General of Sri Lanka ==
#	Postmaster General	Took office	Left office	Appointed by	Notes
1	Egbert Bletterman	1815	1817	Robert Brownrigg	first official Postmaster General
2	Louis Sansoni	1817	1826	Robert Brownrigg	
3	George William Stewart	1826	1833	Edward Barnes	
4	George Lee	1833	1859	Robert Wilmot-Horton	longest serving Postmaster General
5	William Barton	1859	1867	Charles Justin MacCarthy	
6	Herbert Webb Gillman	1867	1871	Hercules Robinson	
7	Thomas Edward Barnes Skinner	1871	1896	Hercules Robinson	
8	Charles Edward Ducat Pennycuick	1896	1899	Joseph West Ridgeway	
9	Henry Luttrell Moysey	1900	1906	Joseph West Ridgeway	
10	Arthur Sampson Pagden	1906	1913	Henry Arthur Blake	
11	Francis Jagoe Smith	1913	1923	Reginald Edward Stubbs	
12	Maurice Salvador Sreshta	1923	1928	William Henry Manning	first non-European Postmaster General
13	Harry Archibald Burden	1929	1933	Herbert Stanley	
14	John Radley Walters	1933	1940	Reginald Edward Stubbs	
15	John Pringle Appleby	1940	1947	Andrew Caldecott	
15	Abdon Ignatius Perera	1947	1951	Henry Monck-Mason Moore	first Ceylonese Postmaster General
16	Victor A. Nicholas	1951	1956	Viscount Soulbury	second Ceylonese Postmaster General
17	H. E. Seneviratne	1956	1961		
18	D. G. Dayaratne	1961	1962		
19	A. S. Kohomban-Wickrema	1962	1964		
20	A. L. Perera	1964	1968		
21	G. E. de S. Ellawala	1968	1968		
22	Vernon Abeysekera	1969	1970		
23	C. J. Serasinghe	1970	1973		
24	A. R. M. Jayawardene	1973	1980		
25	A. P. Hapudeniya	1980	1984		
26	U. W. Bandara	1985	1986		
27	A. B. Damunupola	1986	-		
28	K. A. S. Senadheera				
29	M. K. B. Dissanayake	2008	2012		
30	Rohana Abhayaratne	2012	10 July 2018		
31	Ranjith Ariyaratne	14 August 2018	Incumbent		

== See also ==
- Sri Lanka Post

== External links & reference ==
- Sri Lanka Post

Specific
