= History of broadcasting =

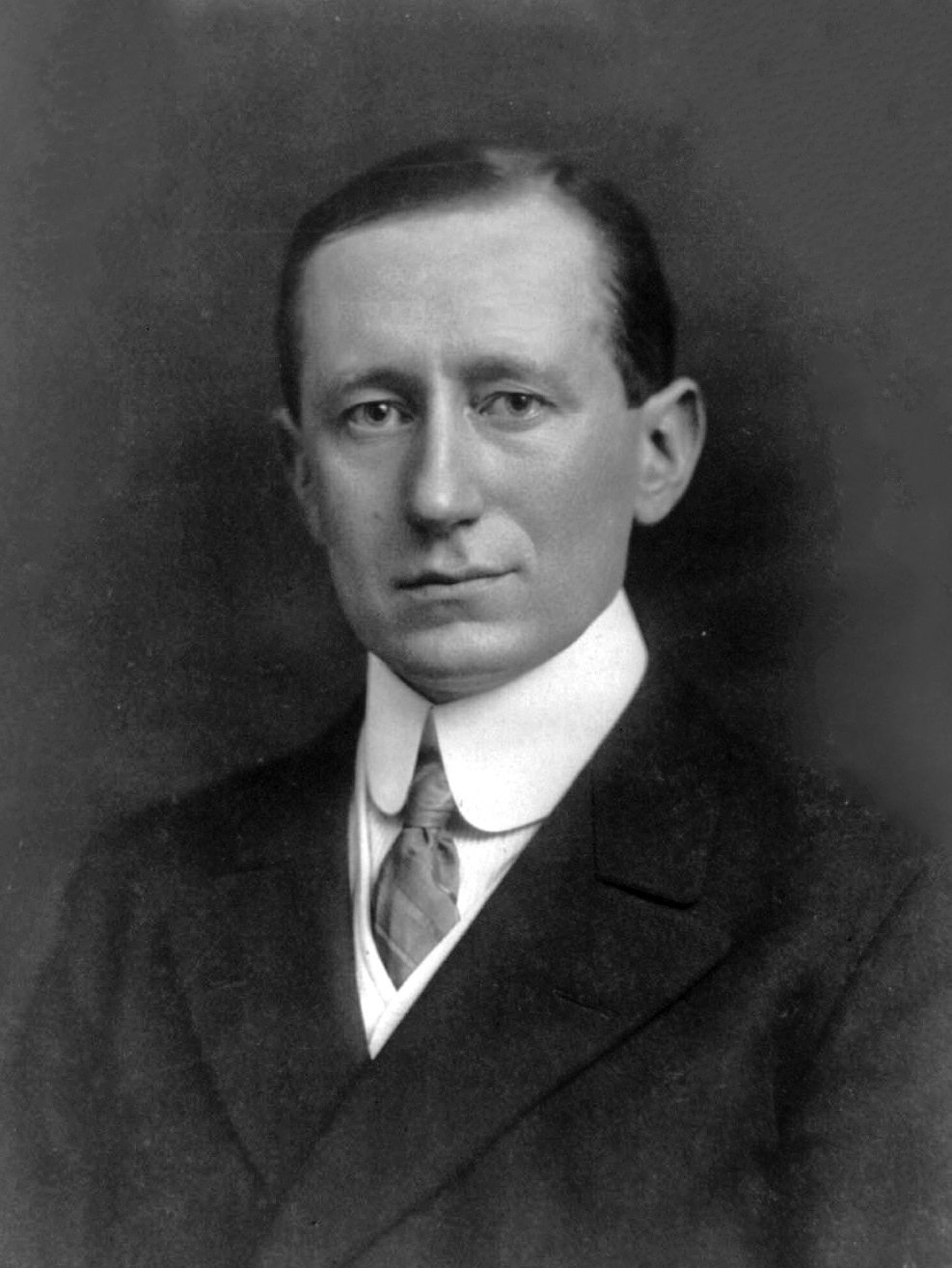
Guglielmo Marconi

It is generally recognized that the first radio transmission was made from a temporary station set up by Italian engineer Guglielmo Marconi in 1895 on the Isle of Wight. This followed on from pioneering work in the field by a number of people including Alessandro Volta, André-Marie Ampère, Georg Ohm, James Clerk Maxwell and Heinrich Rudolf Hertz.

The radio broadcasting of music and talk intended to reach a dispersed audience started experimentally around 1905–1906, and commercially around 1920 to 1923. VHF (very high frequency) stations started 30 to 35 years later. In the early days, radio stations broadcast on the longwave, mediumwave and shortwave bands, and later on VHF (very high frequency) and UHF (ultra high frequency). However, in the United Kingdom, Hungary, France and some other places, from as early as 1890 there was already a system whereby news, music, live theatre, music hall, fiction readings, religious broadcasts, etc., were available in private homes [and other places] via the conventional telephone line, with subscribers being supplied with a number of special, personalised headsets. In Britain this system was known as Electrophone, and was available as early as 1895 or 1899 [sources vary] and up until 1926. In Hungary, it was called Telefon Hírmondó [1893-1920s], and in France, Théâtrophone [1890-1932]).

By the 1950s, virtually every country had a broadcasting system, typically one owned and operated by the government. Alternative modes included commercial radio, as in the United States; or a dual system with both state sponsored and commercial stations, introduced in Australia as early as 1924, with Canada following in 1932. Today, most countries have evolved into a dual system, including the UK. By 1955, practically every family in North America and Western Europe, as well as Japan, had a radio. A dramatic change came in the 1960s with the introduction of small inexpensive portable transistor radios which greatly expanded ownership and usage. Access became practically universal around the world.

== Early broadcasting ==
=== Australia ===
==== Formative years ====
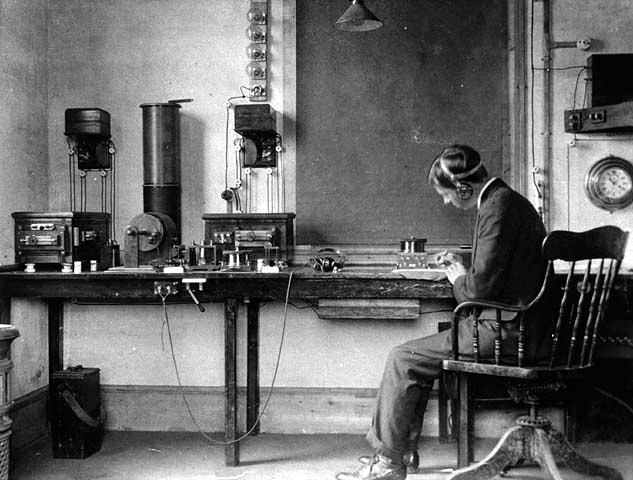
The Marconi Company was formed in England in 1910. The photo shows a typical early scene, from 1906, with Marconi employee Donald Manson at right.

Australian radio hams can be traced to the early 1900s. The 1905 Wireless Telegraphy Act whilst acknowledging the existence of wireless telegraphy, brought all broadcasting matters in Australia under the control of the Federal Government. In 1906, the first official Morse code transmission in Australia was by the Marconi Company between Queenscliff, Victoria and Devonport, Tasmania.

==== Experiments with broadcasting music ====
The first broadcast of music was made during a demonstration on 13 August 1919 by Ernest Fisk of AWA. A number of amateurs commenced broadcasting music in 1920 and 1921. Many other amateurs soon followed. 2CM was run by Charles MacLuran who started the station in 1921 with regular Sunday evening broadcasts from the Wentworth Hotel in Sydney. 2CM is often regarded as Australia's first, regular, non-official station.

==== Sealed set system ====
It was not until November 1923 when the government finally gave its approval for a number of officially recognised medium wave stations. All stations operated under a unique Sealed Set system under which each set was sealed to the frequency of one station. Part of the price of the set went to the government via the Postmaster-General's Department (PMG), with money also going to the broadcaster. Apart from extremely limited advertising, this was the broadcasters' only source of income. From the outset problems with the system came to the fore. Many young people built their own sets, which could receive all the stations.

==== Categories in Australia from 1924 ====
As early as July 1924, the Sealed Set system was declared to be unsuccessful and it was replaced by a system of A Class and B Class stations. There were one or two A Class stations in each major market and these were paid for by a listener's licence fee imposed on all listeners-in. The five former sealed set stations became A Class stations, and they were soon joined by stations in other State capitals.

Amateur broadcasters continued to operate in the long wave and short wave bands.

A national service, the Australian Broadcasting Commission, was formed in July 1932, when the Australian Broadcasting Company's contract expired.

==== Early experiments with television ====
As early as 1929, two Melbourne commercial radio stations, 3UZ and 3DB were conducting experimental mechanical television broadcasts – these were conducted in the early hours of the morning, after the stations had officially closed down. In 1934 Valentine McDowall conducted experiments in electronic television at amateur station 4CM Brisbane.

==== Mobile stations ====
Two of Australia's most unusual medium wave stations were mobile stations 2XT and 3YB. They both operated in eras prior to the universal establishment of rural radio stations. 2XT was designed and operated by AWA within New South Wales, from a NSW Railways train, between November 1925 and December 1927. 2XT, which stood for experimental train, visited over 100 rural centres. Engineers would set up a transmitting aerial and the station would then begin broadcasting. This led to the further sales of AWA products. 3YB provided a similar service in rural Victoria between October 1931 and November 1935. Initially, the station operated from a Ford car and a Ford truck, but from 17 October 1932 they operated from a converted 1899 former Royal Train carriage. Whilst the engineers were setting up the station's 50-watt transmitter in the town being visited, salesmen would sign up advertisers for the fortnight that 3YB would broadcast from that region. The station was on the air from 6.00 and 10.00 pm daily, and its 1,000-record library was divided into set four-hour programs, one for each of 14 days. In other words, the music broadcast from each town was identical. The station was operated by Vic Dinenny, but named after announcer Jack Young from Ballarat. On 18 January 1936, Dinenny set up 3YB Warrnambool, followed on 18 May 1937 by 3UL Warragul.

The merchant vessel MV Kanimbla is believed to be the world's only ship built with an inbuilt broadcasting station. The Kanimbla was constructed in Northern Ireland in 1936 and was primarily designed for McIlwraith, McEacharn & Company to ply passengers between Cairns and Fremantle. The broadcasting station was constructed and operated by AWA and was initially given the ham radio callsign VK9MI but was later 9MI. (At this time, the "9" in the callsign was aberrationary [see "Call Signs, above].) The station made an experimental broadcast before leaving Northern Ireland, and a number of such broadcasts at sea, on the way to Australia. 9MI's first official broadcast in April 1939 was made from the Great Australian Bight. The station broadcast on short wave, usually a couple of times per week, but many of its programs were relayed to commercial medium wave stations that were also owned by AWA. The 9MI manager and announcer (and probably the only member of staff) was Eileen Foley. 9MI ceased broadcasting at the commencement of World War II in September 1939. The Kanimbla was commissioned as a Royal Navy (later Royal Australian Navy) vessel with the name HMS/HMAS Kanimbla. It had an extremely prominent and successful war-time career.

=== Canada ===
The history of broadcasting in Canada begins as early as 1919 with the first experimental broadcast programs in Montreal. The Canadians were swept up in the radio craze and built crystal sets to listen to American stations while The Marconi Wireless Telegraph Company of Canada offered its first commercially produced radio-broadcast receiver (Model "C") in 1921, followed by its "Marconiphone" Model I in 1923. Main themes in the history include the development of the engineering technology; the construction of stations across the country and the building of networks; the widespread purchase and use of radio and television sets by the general public; debates regarding state versus private ownership of stations; financing of the broadcasts media through the government, license fees, and advertising; the changing content of the programming; the impact of the programming on Canadian identity; the media's influence on shaping audience responses to music, sports and politics; the role of the Québec government; Francophone versus Anglophone cultural tastes; the role of other ethnic groups and First Nations; fears of American cultural imperialism via the airwaves; and the impact of the Internet and smartphones on traditional broadcasting media.

Radio signals carried long distances, and a number of American stations could easily be received in parts of Canada. The first Canadian station was CFCF, originally an experimental station from the Marconi Company in Montreal. Civilian use of Wireless Telegraphy had been forbidden in Canada for the duration of World War I. The Marconi Wireless Telegraph Company of Canada was the only one to retain the right to continue radio experiments for military use. This proved instrumental in giving the company a lead in developing an experimental radio broadcasting station immediately after the war. The first radio broadcast in Canada was accomplished by The Marconi Wireless Telegraph Company of Canada in Montreal on December 1, 1919 under the call sign XWA (for "Experimental Wireless Apparatus") from its Williams Street factory. The station began regular programming on May 20, 1920 and its call letters were changed to CFCF on November 4, 1920. In Toronto, the first radio station was operated by the Toronto Star newspaper. Station CKCE began in April 1922 and was so well received that the Star pushed forward with its own studios and transmitting facilities, returning to the air as CFCA in late June 1922. In Montreal, another newspaper, La Presse, put its own station, CKAC on the air in late September 1922. Because there were governmental limitations on radio frequencies back then, CKAC and CFCF alternated—one would broadcast one night, and the other would broadcast the night after that.

As radio grew in popularity during the mid-1920s, a problem arose: the U.S. stations dominated the airwaves and with a limited number of frequencies available for broadcasters to use, it was the American stations that seemed to get most of them. This was despite an agreement with the US Department of Commerce (which supervised broadcasting in the years prior to the Federal Radio Commission) that a certain number of frequencies were reserved exclusively for Canadian signals. But if a US station wanted one of those frequencies, the Department of Commerce seemed unwilling to stop it, much to the frustration of Canadian owners who wanted to put stations on the air. The Canadian government and the US government began negotiations in late 1926, in hopes of finding a satisfactory solution. Meanwhile, in 1928, Canada got its first network, operated by the Canadian National Railways. CNR had already made itself known in radio since 1923, thanks in large part to the leadership of CNR's president, Sir Henry Thornton. The company began equipping its trains with radio receivers, and allowed passengers to hear radio stations from Canada and the US. In 1924, CN began building its own stations, and by 1928, it was able to create a network.

=== Cuba ===
There was interest in radio almost from broadcasting's earliest days. Due to the proximity of Cuba to the U.S. state of Florida, some Cubans would try to listen to the American stations whose signals reached the island. There was no radio station in Cuba until 1922. The arrival of the first radio station, PWX, was greeted with enthusiasm. PWX, owned by the Cuban Telephone Company, was located in Havana. It was a joint venture with the International Telephone and Telegraph Company of New York. PWX debuted on the air on October 10, 1922. PWX broadcast programs in both English and Spanish, and its signal was easily received at night in a number of American cities. Another early station in Cuba was owned by Frank Jones, an American amateur radio operator and Chief Engineer of the Tuinucu Sugar Company. The station used amateur call letters, and went on the air as 6KW. In late 1928, PWX began using the call letters CMC. Its slogan was "If you hear 'La Paloma,' you are in tune with CMC." As with many other countries, interest in radio expanded, and by 1932, Cuba had more than thirty stations, spread out in cities all over the island.

=== Egypt ===
Egyptian Radio began nationwide operations in 1934, also known as the Egyptian Radio's General Program and popularly known as Radio Cairo, is the pioneering Egyptian radio station that started broadcasting on 31 May 1934 in agreement with the Marconi Company. The General Manager of the station for the period was Said Basha Lotfi who presided over the station from May 1934 to December 1947.

=== France ===
Radio Paris began operations in 1922, followed by Radio Toulouse and Radio Lyon. Before 1940, 14 commercial and 12 public sector radio stations were in operation. The government exerted tight control over radio broadcasting. Political debate was discouraged; for example, in the 1932 election campaign, the opposition was allowed one broadcast while the incumbent made numerous campaign broadcasts. France lagged behind other European countries in consumer ownership of radio sets, with 5 million radio receivers in 1937, compared to over 8 million in both Britain and Germany and 26 million in the United States. The government imposed very strict controls on the dissemination of news. After 1938, stations were allowed only three brief bulletins of seven minutes each per day to cover the day's news. The Prime Minister's office closely supervised the news items that were to be broadcast. Due to these policies, French citizens learned little or nothing of the events surrounding the lead-up to World War II from the radio. As a result, the French population was often puzzled about the specifics of current events, and their morale and support for government policies was much weaker than in Britain, where news broadcasts were used to communicate regularly with citizens.

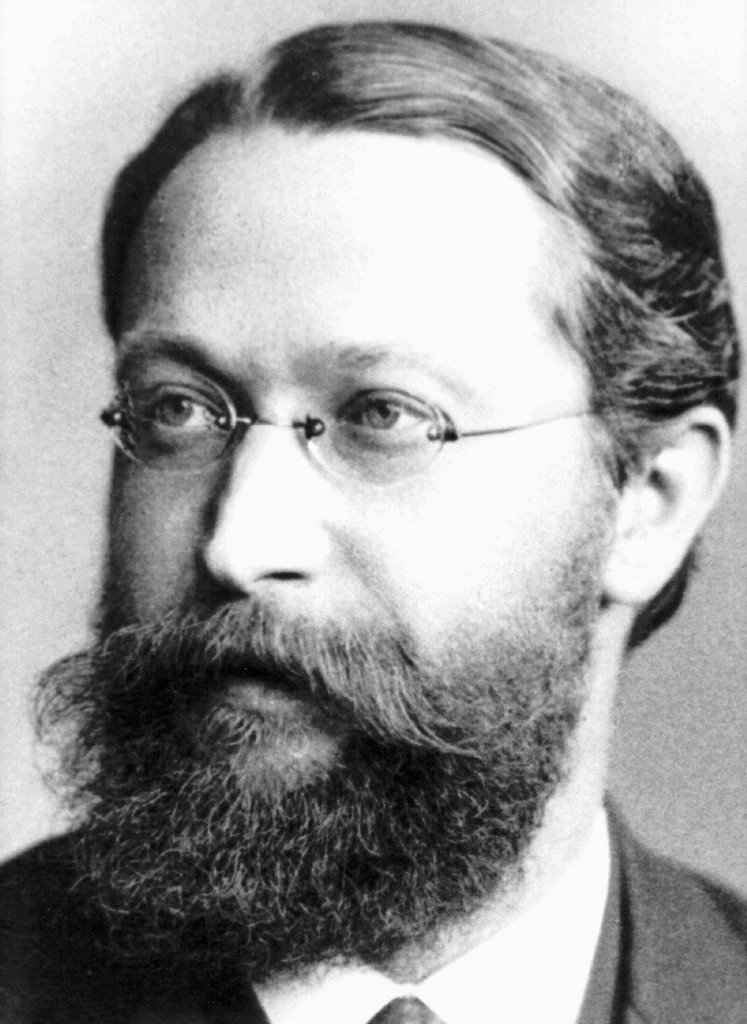
Ferdinand Braun

=== Germany ===
Ferdinand Braun's major contributions were the introduction of a closed tuned circuit in the generating part of the transmitter, and its separation from the radiating part (the antenna) by means of inductive coupling, and later on the usage of crystals for receiving purposes. Braun experimented at first at the University of Strasbourg. Braun had written extensively on wireless subjects and was well known through his many contributions to the Electrician and other scientific journals. In 1899, he would apply for the patents, Electro telegraphy by means of condensers and induction coils and Wireless electro transmission of signals over surfaces. Braun invented the phased array antenna, which led to the development of radar, smart antennas, and MIMO, in 1905 and shared the 1909 Nobel Prize in Physics with Marconi "for their contributions to the development of wireless telegraphy". The first civilian radio broadcast in Germany was a Christmas concert on December 22, 1920. While its reception was confirmed from all over Europe, reception in Germany was still a punishable offense, as a result of the Treaty of Versailles.

The first radio station in Germany went on the air in Berlin in late 1923, using the call letters "LP." Before 1933, German radio broadcasting was conducted by 10 regional broadcasting monopolies, each of which had a government representative on its board. The Post Office provided overall supervision. A listening fee of 2 ℛ︁ℳ︁ per receiver paid most costs, and radio station frequencies were limited, which restricted the number of amateur radio operators. Immediately following Hitler's assumption of power in 1933, Joseph Goebbels became head of the Ministry for Propaganda and Public Enlightenment and took full control of regulating and overseeing broadcasting. Non-Nazis were removed from broadcasting and editorial positions, and Jews were fired from all positions.

Germany was easily served by a number of European mediumwave stations, including the BBC, but the Nazis made it illegal for Germans to listen to foreign broadcasts. During the war, German stations broadcast war propaganda and entertainment for German forces dispersed through Europe, as well as air raid alerts. There was heavy use of short wave for "Germany Calling" programmes directed at Britain and Allied forces around the world. Goebbels also set up numerous Nazi stations that pretended to be from the Allied world.

=== Japan ===
The first radio station in Japan was JOAK, which opened in Tokyo in March 1925. It was founded by Masajiro Kotamura, an inventor and engineer. It was unique in that at least one of its announcers was a woman, Akiko Midorikawa. JOAK was followed soon after by JOBK in Osaka and JOCK in Nagoya. The National Broadcasting Service, today known as NHK (Nippon Hoso Kyokai), began in August 1926. All stations were supported by licensing fees: in 1926, for example, people wishing to receive a permit to own a radio set paid a fee of one yen a month to the government. Programming on Japanese stations of the 1920s included music, news, language instruction (lessons were offered in English, French and German) and education talks. These early stations broadcast on average about eight hours of programs a day.

=== Mexico ===
Amateur radio was very popular in Mexico; while most of the hams were male, notably Constantino de Tarnava, acknowledged in some sources as Mexico's first amateur radio operator, one of the early ham radio operators was female—Maria Dolores Estrada. But commercial radio broadcasting was difficult to achieve, due to a federal regulation forbidding any broadcasts that were not for the benefit of the Mexican government. Still, in November 1923, CYL in Mexico City went on the air, featuring music (both folk songs and popular dance concerts), religious services, and news. CYL used as its slogans "El Universal" and "La Casa del Radio", and it won over the government by giving political candidates the opportunity to use the station to campaign. Its signal was so powerful that it could sometimes be received in Canada. Pressure from listeners and potential station owners also contributed to the government relenting and allowing more stations to go on the air. In 1931, the "C" call letters were all changed to "X" call letters (XE being reserved for broadcasting), and by 1932, Mexico had nearly forty radio stations, ten of which were in Mexico City.

=== Philippines ===
Interest in amateur radio was noted in the Philippines in the early 1920s. There were radio stations operating in the Philippines, including one owned by American businessman named Henry Hermann, as early as 1922, according to some sources; not much documentation about that period of time exists. In the autumn of 1927, KZRM in Manila, owned by the Radio Corporation of the Philippines, went on the air. The Radio Corporation of the Philippines was a subsidiary of American company RCA (Radio Corporation of America). By 1932, the island had three radio stations: KRZC in Cebu, as well as KZIB (owned by a department store) and KZFM, the government-owned station in Manila. Of the stations listed by Pierre Key, KZFM was the strongest, with 50,000 watts. Two radio networks were ultimately created: one, the Manila Broadcasting Company, began as a single station, KZRH in Manila, in July 1939, and after World War II, in 1946, the station's owners began to develop their network by buying other radio properties. As for the Philippine Broadcasting Company, it too began with one station (KZFM), and received its new name in mid-1946, after the Philippines became an independent country. At the end of 1946, the new network had six stations. Both KZRH and KZFM also affiliated with American networks; the stations wanted to have access to certain popular American programs, and the American networks wanted to sell products in the Philippines.

=== Sri Lanka ===
Sri Lanka has the oldest radio station in Asia and the second oldest in the world, known as Radio Ceylon. It is now known as the Sri Lanka Broadcasting Corporation. Sri Lanka created broadcasting history in Asia when broadcasting was started in Ceylon by the Telegraph Department in 1923 on an experimental footing, just three years after the inauguration of broadcasting in Europe. Gramophone music was broadcast from a tiny room in the Central Telegraph Office with the aid of a small transmitter built by Telegraph Department engineers using the radio equipment of a captured German submarine.

=== United Kingdom ===
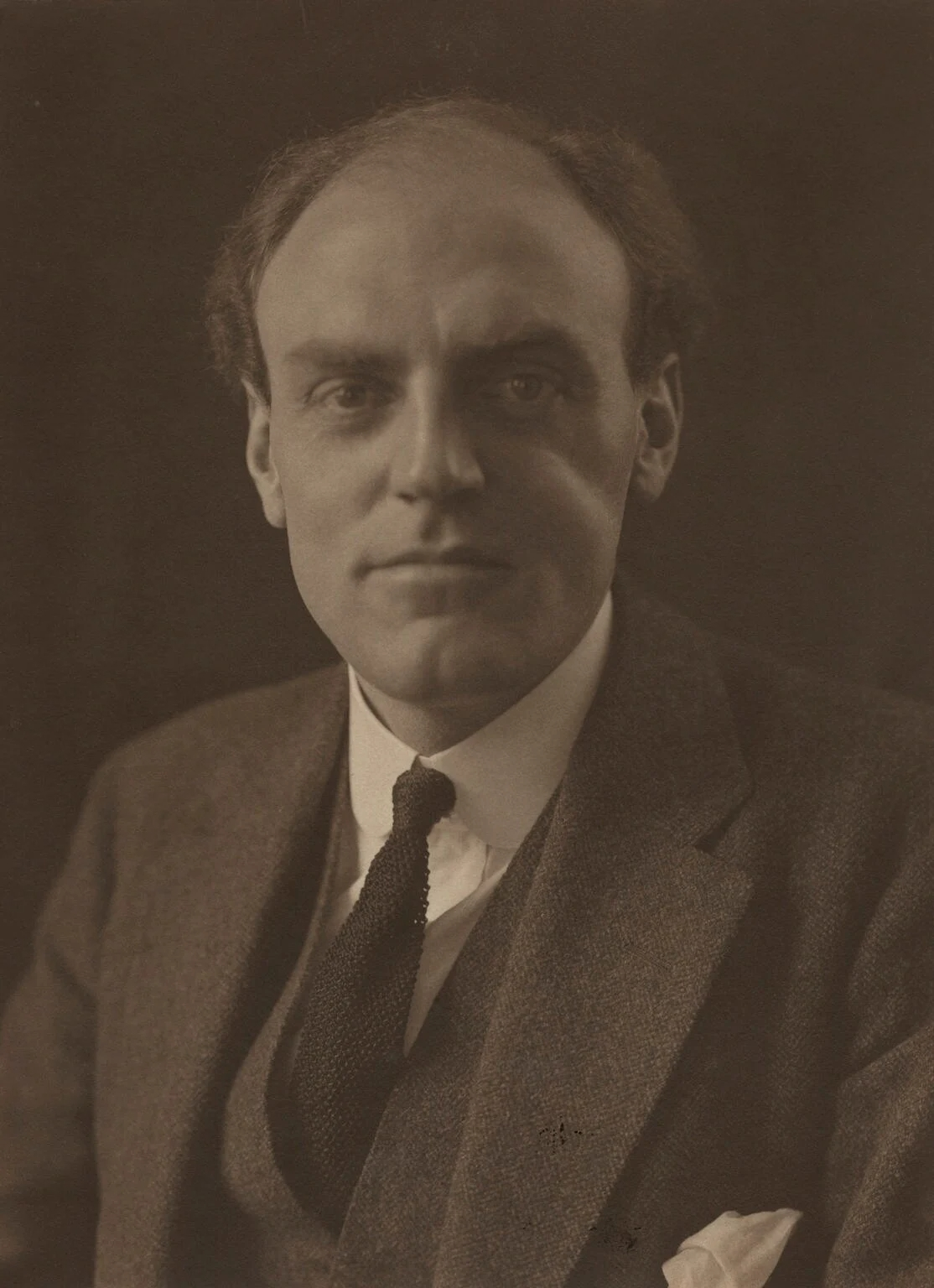
Portrait of John Reith, 1st Baron Reith, in 1925, founding director general of the BBC from 1922 to 1938

The first experimental music broadcasts, from Marconi's factory in Chelmsford, began in 1920. Two years later, in October 1922, a consortium of radio manufacturers formed the British Broadcasting Company (BBC); they allowed some sponsored programs, although they were not what we would today consider a fully commercial station. Meanwhile, the first radio stations in England were experimental station 2MT, located near Chelmsford, and station 2LO in London: both were operated by the Marconi Company. By late 1923, there were six stations broadcasting regularly in the United Kingdom: London's 2LO, Manchester's 2ZY, and stations in Birmingham (5IT), Cardiff, Newcastle, and Glasgow. As for the consortium of radio manufacturers, it dissolved in 1926, when its license expired; it then became the British Broadcasting Corporation, a non-commercial organization. Its governors are appointed by the British government, but they do not answer to it. Lord Reith took a formative role in developing the BBC, especially in radio.

=== United States ===
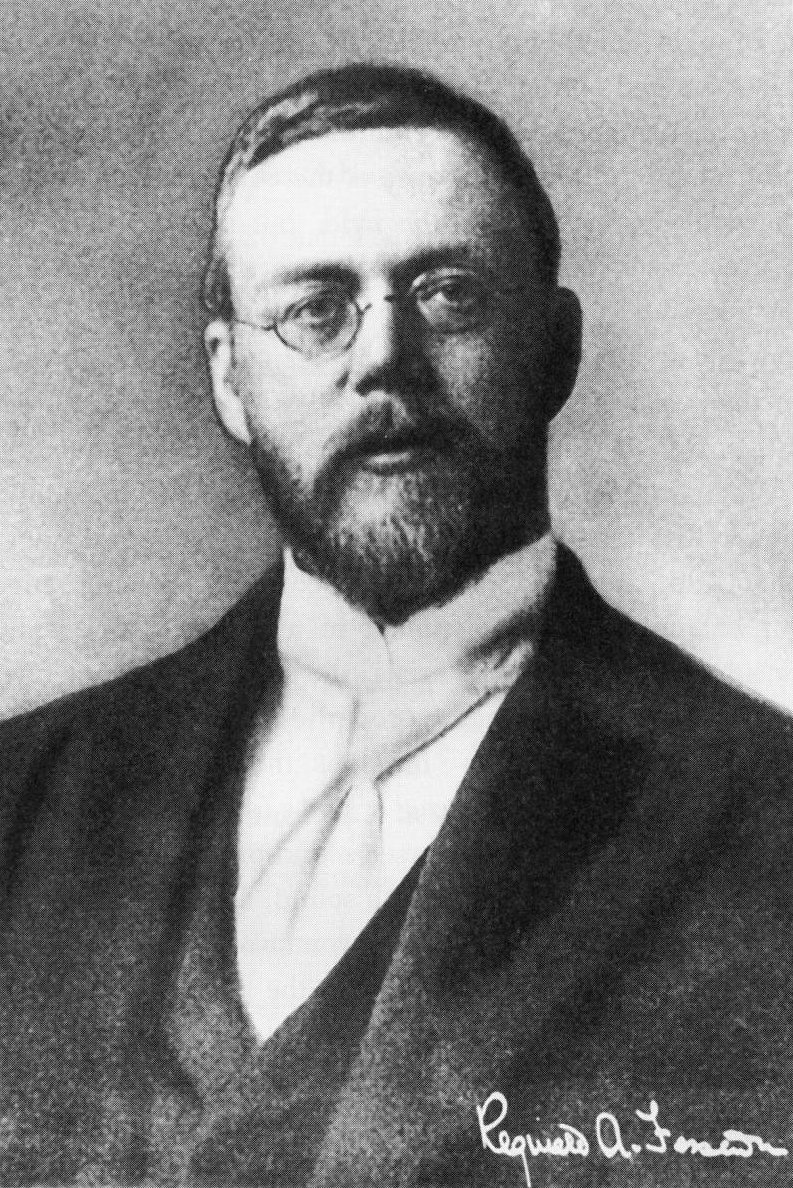
Reginald Fessenden, the "father" of radio broadcasting in the U.S.

Reginald Fessenden did ground-breaking experiments with voice and music by 1906. Charles "Doc" Herrold of San Jose, California sent out broadcasts as early as April 1909 from his Herrold School electronics institute in downtown San Jose, using the identification San Jose Calling, and then a variety of different call signs as the Department of Commerce began to regulate radio. He was on the air daily for nearly a decade when the World War interrupted operations.

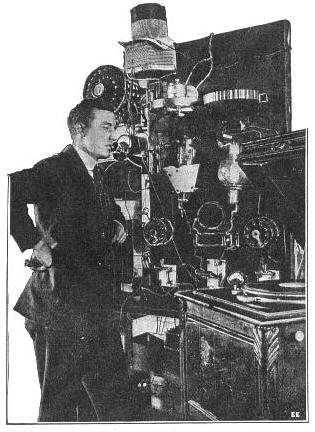
Charles Logwood broadcasting at New York station 2XG, 1916

Pioneer radio station 2XG, also known as the "Highbridge station", was an experimental station located in New York City and licensed to the DeForest Radio Telephone and Telegraph Company. It was the first station to use a vacuum tube transmitter to make radio broadcasts on a regular schedule. From 1912 to 1917 Charles Herrold made regular broadcasts, but used an arc transmitter. He switched to a vacuum tube transmitter when he restarted broadcasting activities in 1921. Herrold coined the terms broadcasting and narrowcasting. Herrold claimed the invention of broadcasting to a wide audience, through the use of antennas designed to radiate signals in all directions. David Sarnoff has been considered by many as "the prescient prophet of broadcasting who predicted the medium's rise in 1915", referring to his radio music box concept.

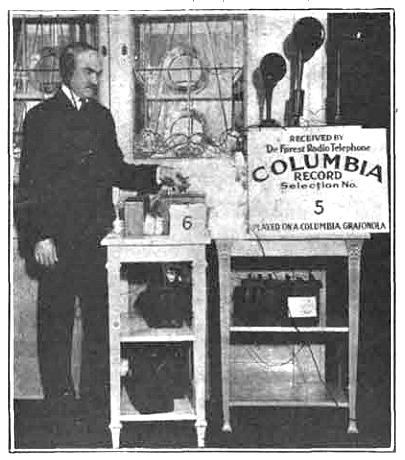
Lee DeForest broadcasting Columbia phonograph records on New York station 2XG, 1916

A few organizations were allowed to keep working on radio during the war. Westinghouse was the most well-known of these. Frank Conrad, a Westinghouse engineer, had been making transmissions from 8XK since 1916 that included music programming. A team at the University of Wisconsin–Madison headed by Professor Earle M. Terry was also on the air.

By 1919, after the war, radio pioneers across the country resumed transmissions. The early stations gained new call signs. A few early stations, notably 8MK (later known as WWJ in Detroit) were started by newspapers, but in those early years, radio and newspapers regarded each other as competitors. One early station, 8XK in Pittsburgh, became KDKA in 1920; its ownership has asserted that it was the first radio station in the US, but that claim is controversial

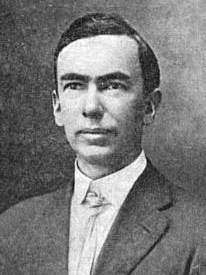
Broadcasting pioneer Frank Conrad in a 1921 portrait

Silent film actor Rudolph Valentino was an early pioneer of celebrity broadcasting, becoming the first major film star to use radio as a means of publicity by making appearances on emerging U.S. radio stations beginning in 1922. Following Valentino's unexpected death in August 1926, WNYC in New York City held what was likely the first radio memorial service.

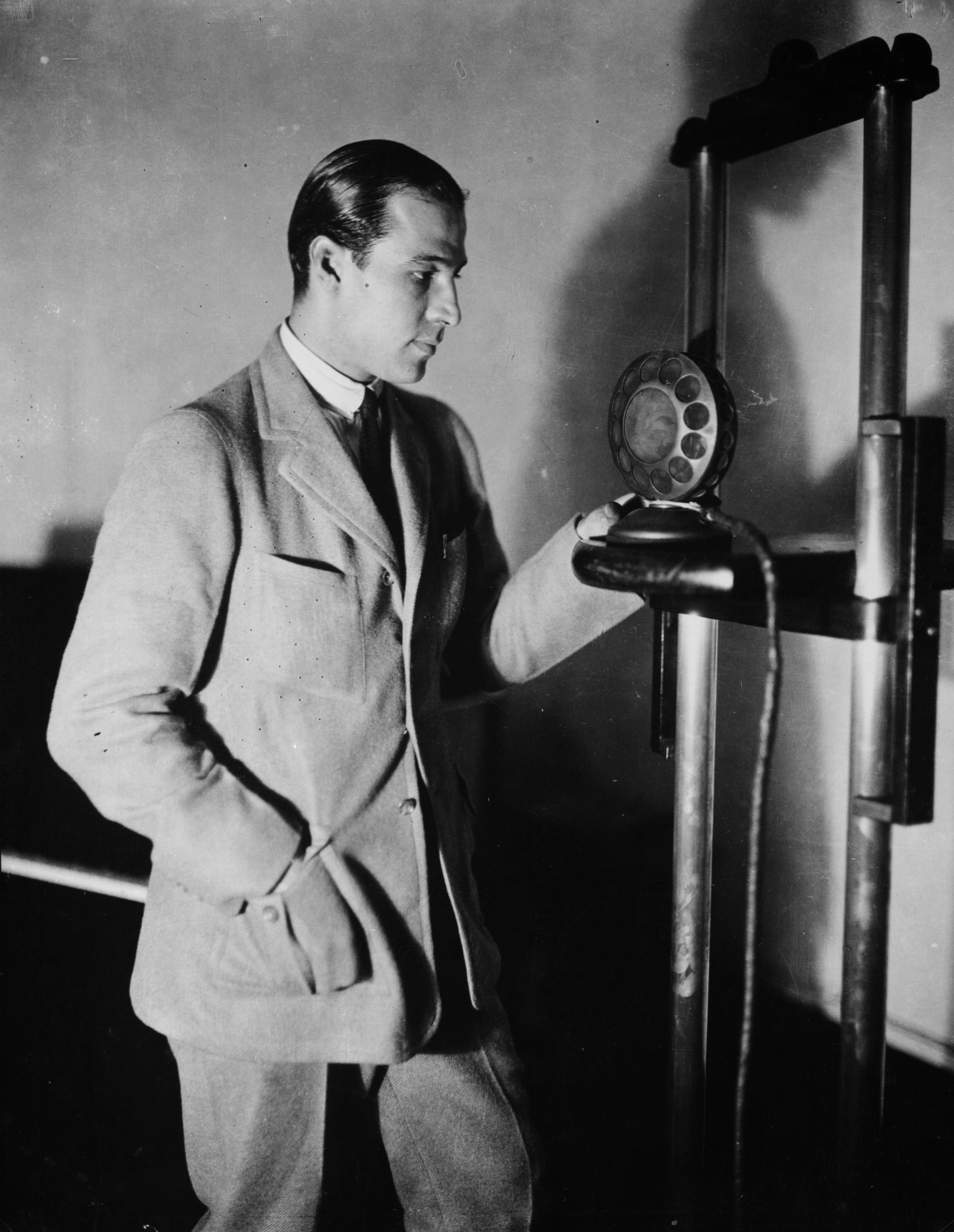
Screen idol Rudolph Valentino at the microphone of WSB in Atlanta, 1923

Radio in education began as early as April 1922, when Medford Hillside's WGI Radio broadcast the first of an ongoing series of educational lectures from Tufts College professors. These lectures were described by the press as a sort of "wireless college." Soon, other colleges across the U.S. began adding radio broadcasting courses to their curricula; some, like the University of Iowa, even provided what today would be known as distance-learning credits. Curry College, first in Boston and then in Milton, Massachusetts, introduced one of the nation's first broadcasting majors in 1932 when the college teamed up with WLOE in Boston to have students broadcast programs. This success led to numerous radio courses in the curriculum which has taught thousands of radio broadcasters from the 1930s to today.

Radio advertising emerged in the 1920s, when manufacturers of radio equipment established the first stations and offered programming primarily to stimulate radio sales. Before this period, advertising was largely limited to barkers, flyers, posters, and other printed materials distributed by merchants. The American advertising industry, centered on Madison Avenue, quickly recognized radio's commercial potential, and advertising soon became the medium’s primary source of funding.

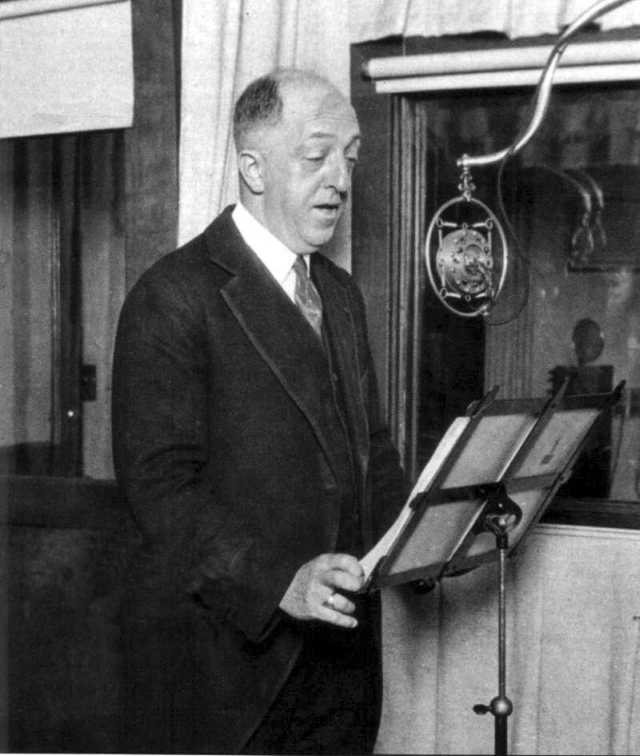
"Doc" Herrold is shown at the microphone of KQW, c. 1925

By 1931, a majority of U.S. households owned at least one radio receiver. In 1934, several independent stations formed the Mutual Broadcasting System to exchange syndicated programming, including The Lone Ranger and Amos 'n' Andy.

Prior to 1927, U.S. radio was supervised by the Department of Commerce. Then, the Radio Act of 1927 created the Federal Radio Commission (FRC); in 1934, this agency became known as the Federal Communications Commission (FCC). A Federal Communications Commission decision in 1939 required NBC to divest itself of its Blue Network. That decision was sustained by the Supreme Court in a 1943 decision, National Broadcasting Co. v. United States, which established the framework that the "scarcity" of radio-frequency meant that broadcasting was subject to greater regulation than other media. This Blue Network network became the American Broadcasting Company (ABC). Around 1946, ABC, NBC, and CBS began regular television broadcasts. Another TV network, the DuMont Television Network, was founded earlier, but was disbanded in 1956; later in 1986 the surviving DuMont independent stations formed the nucleus of the new Fox Broadcasting Company.

== 1950s and 1960s ==
=== Australia ===
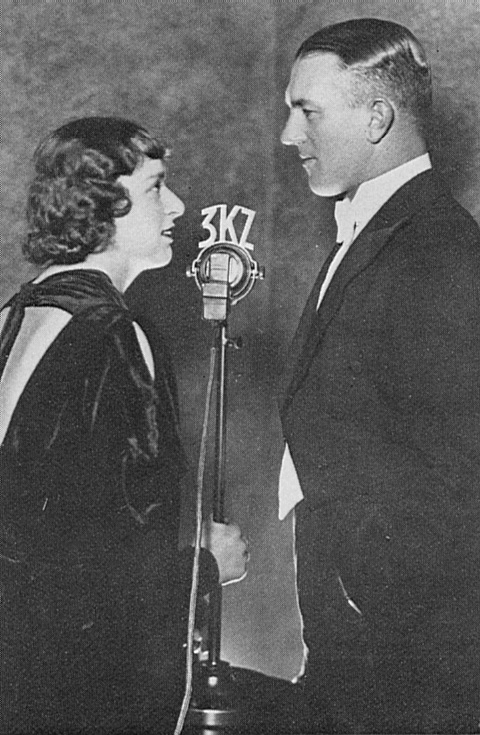
Naomi ("Joan") Melwit and Norman Banks at the 3KZ microphone, in the late 1930s

Norman Banks was one of Melbourne's (and Australia's) most prominent broadcasters at 3KZ (1930-1952) and 3AW (1952-1978). He is remembered for founding Carols by Candlelight, as a pioneer football commentator, and for hosting both musical and interview programs. In later years he was one of Melbourne's first and most prominent talk back hosts. At the commencement of his career, Banks was known for his double entendres and risque remarks; as a talk back host he was outspoken in his conservative views, especially regarding the White Australia policy and Apartheid. In 1978 his 47-year career in radio was hailed as the longest in world history.

Australian radio sets usually had the positions of radio stations marked on their dials. The illustration is a dial from a transistorised, mains-operated Calstan radio, c. 1960s. (Click image for a high resolution view, with readable callsigns.)

The transistor radio first appeared on the market in 1954. In particular, it made portable radios even more transportable. All sets quickly became smaller, cheaper and more convenient. The aim of radio manufacturers became a radio in every room, in the car, and in the pocket. The upshot of these two changes was that stations started to specialise and concentrate on specific markets. The first areas to see specialised stations were the news and current affairs market, and stations specialising in pop music and geared toward the younger listener who was now able to afford his/her own radio. Talk back ("talk radio") became a major radio genre by the end of the 1960s, but it was not legalised in Australia until October 1967.

=== Germany ===
When the Federal Republic of Germany was organized in 1949, its Enabling Act established strong state government powers. Broadcasting was organized on a state, rather than a national, basis. Nine regional radio networks were established. A technical coordinating organization, the Arbeitsgemeinschaft der öffentlich-rechtlichen Rundfunkanstalten der Bundesrepublik Deutschland (ARD), came into being in 1950 to lessen technical conflicts. The Allied forces in Europe developed their own radio networks, including the U.S. American Forces Network (AFN). Inside Berlin, Radio in the American Sector (RIAS) became a key source of news in the German Democratic Republic.

=== Sri Lanka ===
Radio Ceylon was popular in the 1950s and 1960s in the Indian sub-continent. The station developed into the most popular radio network in South Asia. Millions of listeners in India for example tuned into Radio Ceylon. Announcers such as Livy Wijemanne, Vernon Corea, Pearl Ondaatje, Tim Horshington, Greg Roskowski, Jimmy Bharucha, Mil Sansoni, Eardley Peiris, Shirley Perera, Bob Harvie, Christopher Greet, Prosper Fernando, Ameen Sayani (of Binaca Geetmala fame),Karunaratne Abeysekera, S.P.Mylvaganam (the first Tamil announcer on the Commercial Service) were hugely popular across South Asia. The Hindi service helped build Radio Ceylon's fanbase among Hindi speakers in the Indian sub-continent. Gopal Sharma, Sunil Dutt, Ameen Sayani, and Hamid Sayani were some of the Indian announcers of the station. The Commercial Service of Radio Ceylon was hugely successful under the leadership of Clifford Dodd, the Australian administrator and broadcasting expert who was sent to Ceylon under the Colombo Plan.

=== United States ===
By 1955, a majority of U.S. households owned at least one television set.

== 1970s, 1980s, and 1990s ==
The Australian Broadcasting Corporation logo, first introduced in 1975 and based on the Lissajous curve

=== Europe ===
Commercial radio (re-)legalisation in most European countries occurred in this era, starting with United Kingdom in 1973 (see Independent Local Radio) and ending with Austria in 1995.
In 1987, stations in the European Broadcasting Union began offering Radio Data System (RDS), which provides written text information about programs that were being broadcast, as well as traffic alerts, accurate time, and other teletext services.

== 2000s ==
=== Australia ===
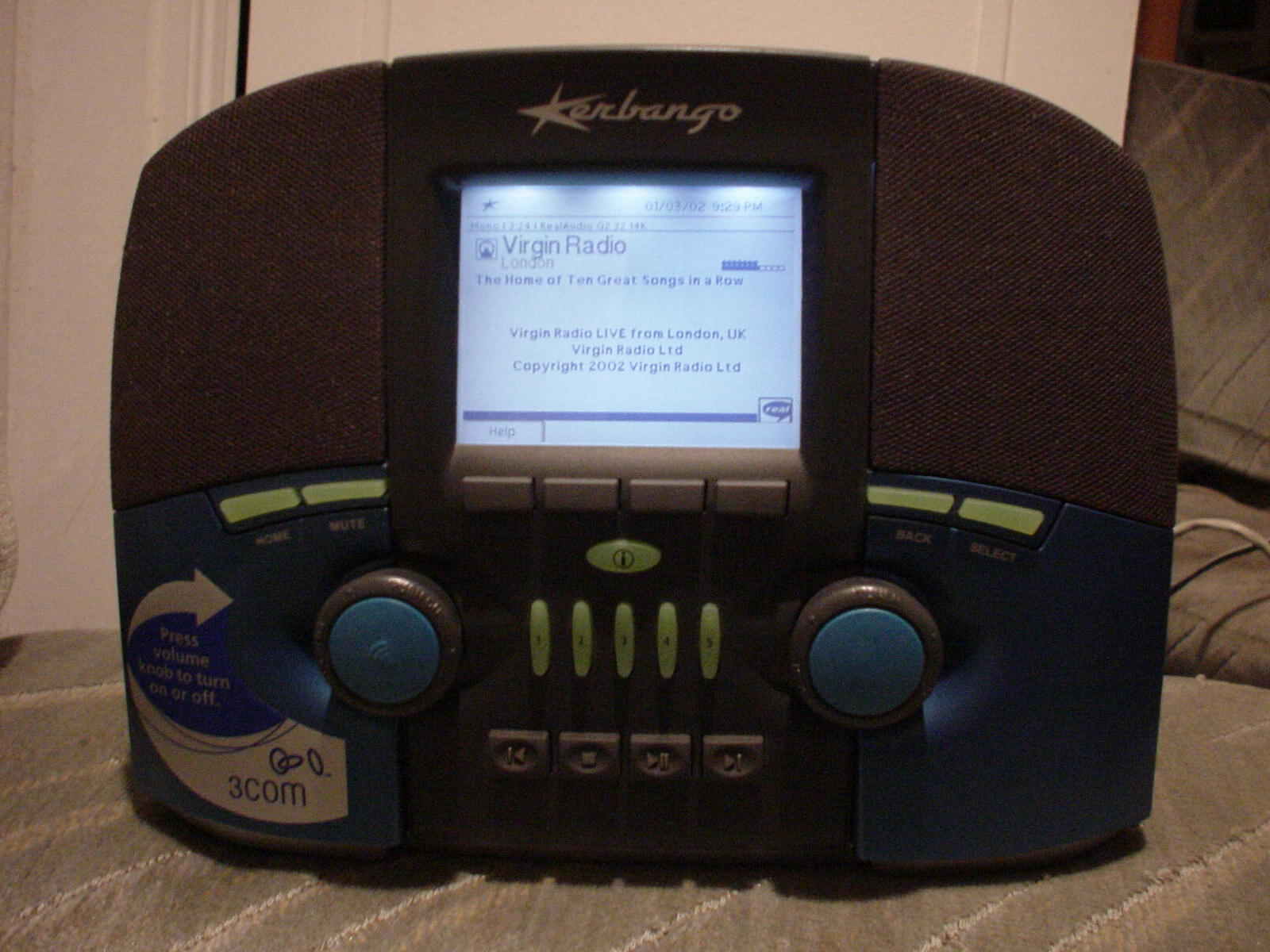
The "Kerbango Internet Radio" was the first stand-alone product that let users listen to Internet radio without a computer.

In Australia, from August 2009, digital radio was phased in by geographical region. Today, the ABC, SBS, commercial and community radio stations operate on the AM and FM bands. Most stations are available on the internet and most also have digital outlets. By 2007, there were 261 commercial stations in Australia.

=== Sri Lanka ===
In Sri Lanka in 2005, in a celebration of 80 years of history of broadcasting, the former Director-General of the Sri Lanka Broadcasting Corporation, Eric Fernando, called for the station to take full advantage of the digital age – this included looking at the archives of Radio Ceylon. Ivan Corea asked the President of Sri Lanka, Mahinda Rajapakse, to invest in the future of the SLBC.

== See also ==
- AM broadcasting#History
- FM broadcasting#History
- Oldest radio station
- Oldest television station
- Women in early radio
- History of advertising
- History of radio
- History of journalism
- Timeline of radio
- Timeline of the introduction of radio in countries
- Radio broadcasting
- History of podcasting
- History of telecommunication
- History of television
