= Cliff Foenander =

Sri Lankan musician

- Born: 1934; Colombo, Ceylon
- Died: November 21, 2000 (aged 65–66) Australia
- Occupations: Musician, singer
- Instrument: Vocals

Cliff Foenander (1934 – 21 November 2000) was a Sri Lankan musician who performed in South East Asia and Las Vegas.

== Career ==
Foenander grew up in Colombo, and in the 1950s he started performing in clubs and dances around Ceylon.

South Asia's oldest radio station, Radio Ceylon (now the Sri Lanka Broadcasting Corporation) gave Foenander his first exposure inside Ceylon and across South Asia, including India. Broadcasters Vernon Corea, Jimmy Bharucha and Tim Horshington played his songs and interviewed him on their radio shows.

Foenander later joined Hong Kong–based group The Fabulous Echoes and they built a fan base in Hong Kong, the Philippines, Malaysia, Singapore, Indonesia and Japan. The Fabulous Echoes gained international exposure playing in Las Vegas in the United States of America, also performing with rat pack members Frank Sinatra, Dean Martin and Sammy Davis Jr, with Ella Fitzgerald and the great "Satchmo", Louis Armstrong. The Fabulous Echoes performed on The Ed Sullivan Show after Ed saw them in action in the Thunderbird Lounge.

Foenander continued his music career after The Fabulous Echoes. He settled in Melbourne, Australia. It was during his time that his voice really matured and he was a regular entertainer at many entertainment spots in Melbourne and elsewhere in Australia. He died in Australia on 21 November 2000, aged 66.

== Family ==
Foenander's nephew, Robin Foenander, performs in Australia and has released several CDs and a country music song, "Further Down The Road", with the folk music artist Keith Potger, who was a founder member of the Seekers and the New Seekers.

== See also ==
- Sri Lanka Broadcasting Corporation
- Radio Ceylon
- Vernon Corea
- List of Sri Lankan musicians
