= Elmo Fernando =

- Born: Sri Lanka
- Died: 11 August 2016 (aged 75); Colombo
- Occupation: Broadcaster
- Employer: Radio Ceylon / Sri Lanka Broadcasting Corporation / British Broadcasting Corporation
- Known for: Broadcasting
- Title: Colombo Correspondent of the BBC

Elmo Fernando (died 11 August 2016) was a popular announcer with Radio Ceylon and subsequently the Ceylon Broadcasting Corporation. Fernando was an excellent reader of the news. He joined Radio Ceylon, the oldest radio station in South Asia at a time when it was known as the 'King of the Airwaves' in the 1950s and 1960s. Millions tuned into the station from across the Indian sub-continent. When he was at Radio Ceylon he was mentored by the veteran broadcaster Vernon Corea.

Fernando left the Sri Lanka Broadcasting Corporation in the 1970s and joined an overseas Catholic radio station. He was a Colombo Correspondent of the BBC.

== See also ==
- Radio Ceylon
- Sri Lanka Broadcasting Corporation
- List of Sri Lankan Broadcasters

== Bibliography ==
- Wavell, Stuart. - The Art of Radio - Training Manual written by the Director Training of the CBC. - Ceylon Broadcasting Corporation, 1969.
