= Satsorupavathy Nathan =

Satsorupavathy Nathan சற்சொரூபவதி நாதன்
- Born: 6 March 1937; Jaffna, Sri Lanka
- Died: 4 May 2017 (aged 80)
- Education: Jaffna Hindu Ladies' College
- Occupations: Radio personality, news presenter, speaker
- Known for: Tamil broadcasting

Satsorupavathy Nathan (Tamil: சற்சொரூபவதி நாதன்) also known as Carcorupavati Natan (6 March 1937 – 4 May 2017) was a Sri Lankan Tamil radio broadcaster and a news presenter. She was popular among the Sinhalese society due to her fluency in all three languages of the country and also due to her ability to deal with other people of various castes and religions. She is considered one of the greatest Tamil women in Sri Lanka for contributing towards media.

== Education ==
She was educated at the Jaffna Hindu Ladies College in Jaffna and graduated at the University of Madras. In the University of Madras, she received her BA degree.

== Radio broadcasting ==
Satsorupavathy joined radio broadcasting in 1965. She was recruited by the Radio Ceylon in 1965 and she had been with the Radio Ceylon for more than 40 years. Satsorupavathy Nathan excelled as a good public speaker as well as a debater in her mother tongue, Tamil language. She is regarded as the best news reader in Sri Lanka after Chendhilmani Mylvaganam in Tamil language. She too was fluent in English and was once called upon to serve as a programme organizer for talks and features in the English service of the Sri Lanka Broadcasting Corporation (SLBC). Since then, she held the position of programme organizer in the English service of SLBC. She had also edited Tamil news bulletins.

== Social services ==
Satsorupavathy Nathan has worked as a science teacher in a Buddhist Ladies College and served as a part time lecturer. She was also the first female Vice President of Colombo Tamil Sangam. She too served as an orator and as a speaker on women's interests and their rights.

== Biography and death ==
Satsorupavathy Nathan was born on 6 March 1937 in a village in Jaffna. She remained as a single without being married during her lifetime and dedicated her lifetime towards media and social welfare services.

Satsorupavathy Nathan died on 4 May 2017 at the age of 80.

== Awards ==
- Jawarhalal Nehru Award (1958)
- Presidential Award for best announcer (1995)
- Lifetime achiever award
- Recipient of Unda International Award

== See also ==
- List of Sri Lankan broadcasters
