= Desmond Kelly =

Ceylonese musician

Desmond Anthony Carl Kelly (2 July 1936 - 29 April 2023) was a Sri-Lankan-born Australian musician and actor who has entertained in Sri Lanka and in Australia.

== Songs on Radio Ceylon ==
Kelly was one of a group of musicians who were discovered by Radio Ceylon, now the Sri Lanka Broadcasting Corporation. Radio Ceylon gave him a platform for his songs and announcers Vernon Corea and Christopher Greet played his compositions on their music programs - Radio Ceylon made him into a household name - not only in Sri Lanka but also in the Indian subcontinent. His pop hit Dream World was in the hit parades in both Ceylon and India. He has also been featured in the top entertainment column, EMCEE, published in the Ceylon Daily News in the 1960s. Des Kelly was best known for such pop hits such as Dream World, Cha Cha Baby, and The Reason Being. He migrated with his family to Melbourne, Australia in 1962 where he worked as an entertainer.

He has collaborated with fellow Australian musician Robin Foenander on a range of pop songs. Des Kelly has also released CDs which include the popular Sri Lankan baila music and calypso songs.

Des Kelly was semi-retired although he was still in demand in Melbourne as an entertainer until his death.

== See also ==
- Radio Ceylon
- Music of Sri Lanka
- Vernon Corea
