= Mervyn Jayasuriya =

- Born: Colombo, Sri Lanka
- Died: 2008
- Occupation: Broadcaster
- Employer: Radio Ceylon / Sri Lanka Broadcasting Corporation
- Known for: Broadcasting
- Title: Former Assistant Editor News

Mervyn Jayasuriya was a veteran announcer with Radio Ceylon - the oldest radio station in South Asia. Jayasuriya presented some of the most popular radio programmes over the airwaves of Radio Ceylon, such as "Roving Mike" and "Sports Newsreel". Millions tuned into the programmes, right across South Asia.

Mervyn Jayasuriya was also a news reader - he read the English news bulletins of Radio Ceylon. He joined a band of radio announcers who enjoyed popularity in South Asia - millions of listeners in South Asia. In the late 1960s Mervyn Jayasuriya was appointed the Assistant Editor News of the Ceylon Broadcasting Corporation, by Director-General Neville Jayaweera.

Mervyn Jayasuriya was the younger brother of Nalini Jayasuriya, Associate, Fine Arts, Yale University

Before he died in 2008, Mervyn Jayasuriya wrote a series of articles for the Island newspaper in Colombo recalling his days with Radio Ceylon.

== See also ==
- Radio Ceylon
- List of Sri Lankan Broadcasters

== Bibliography ==
- Wavell, Stuart. - The Art of Radio - Training Manual written by the Director Training of the CBC. - Ceylon Broadcasting Corporation, 1969.
