= Dayananda de Silva =

Dayananda de Silva was a distinguished radio journalist who has enjoyed a career of 42 years in public service broadcasting, on the island of Sri Lanka. De Silva joined Radio Ceylon in the early 1960s. Radio Ceylon, now the Sri Lanka Broadcasting Corporation (SLBC), is the oldest radio station in South Asia. Millions of listeners across the Indian sub-continent tuned into Radio Ceylon. Dayananda de Silva joined Radio Ceylon when Ronnie de Mel was the Director-General of the station.

== Newsreader on Radio Ceylon / SLBC ==
Dayananda de Silva soon proved to be a first class newsreader over the airwaves of Radio Ceylon. Among the highlights of a high profile radio career are his interviews with many eminent persons including Queen Elizabeth II, Prince Philip, Lord Mountbatten of Burma, Lee Kuan Yew, Mother Teresa, Zulfikar Ali Bhutto, Benazir Bhutto, Yasser Arafat, Barbara Cartland, Ravi Shankar, Archbishop Makarios, Gregory Peck, Liv Ullmann, Duke Ellington, Sir Arthur C. Clarke, Indira Gandhi and Rajiv Gandhi to name a few.

He served as announcer, newsreader, News Editor, Director/Foreign Relations and Director News and Current Affairs of the SLBC. De Silva has covered a wide range of subjects on his news programs on the SLBC from politics to autism.

He died in June 2010

== See also ==
- Radio Ceylon
- Sri Lanka Broadcasting Corporation
- List of Sri Lankan broadcasters
