= Edward Harper (engineer) =

British engineer

- Born: 1873; United Kingdom
- Occupation: Chief Engineer
- Employer: Ceylon Telegraph Department
- Known for: Pioneering broadcasting experiments in Ceylon and founding the Ceylon Wireless Club
- Title: Father of Broadcasting in Ceylon

Edward Harper (1873 – ) was a British engineer who travelled to Colombo in 1921 to work in the Ceylon Telegraph Department. Harper was appointed Chief Engineer. He had an innovative mind and his passion was broadcasting. Edward Harper is known as the 'Father of Broadcasting,' in Ceylon.

== The launching of broadcasting in Ceylon ==
Harper together with Ceylonese and English radio enthusiasts founded the Ceylon Wireless Club. They experimented with radio broadcasts in 1923 the first experiments took place from a tiny room in the Central Telegraph Office - gramophone music was broadcast with the aid of a small transmitter captured from a German submarine. The transmitter was built by Ceylon Telegraph engineers. This was historic because it happened three years after the inauguration of broadcasting in Europe. Ceylon plays an equal role in the beginnings of broadcasting alongside Europe and the United States of America.

== Colombo Radio ==
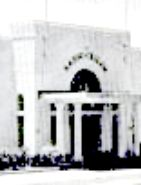
Edward Harper's pioneering radio experiments led to the inauguration of Radio Ceylon, the oldest radio station in South Asia. Radio Ceylon was known as the 'King of the Airwaves' on the Indian sub-continent.

On 16 December 1925 a regular broadcasting service was launched in Colombo. The radio station was known as Colombo Radio, adopting the call sign, 'Colombo Calling.' As a result of Edward Harper's efforts and that of the pioneering Ceylonese engineers, Radio Ceylon came into being; it is the oldest radio station in South Asia.

== See also ==
- Vernon Corea
- Radio Ceylon
- Sri Lanka Broadcasting Corporation
- Sri Lanka
- History of broadcasting
