= Pearl Ondaatje =

Pearl Ondaatje was a presenter on Radio Ceylon, the oldest radio station in South Asia. She was one of the radio station's first female newsreaders, and has been called one of "the finest announcers of South Asia". Ondaatje became English programme organiser for the director general of Radio Ceylon on 6 April 1957. She mentored other presenters.

Pearl Ondaatje worked very closely with the Australian administrator Clifford Dodd and Livy Wijemanne in shaping the new Commercial Service of Radio Ceylon in the 1950s in Colombo. Millions of listeners across South Asia tuned into the hear the voices of announcers such as Pearl Ondaatje. Radio Ceylon ruled the airwaves of the Indian sub-continent in the 1950s and 1960s.

She is a relative of the Canadian-English philanthropist, Sir Christopher Ondaatje and his brother, the award-winning Canadian author Michael Ondaatje, who were both born in Ceylon.

== See also ==
- Radio Ceylon
- Sri Lanka Broadcasting Corporation
- Quint Ondaatje
