= Nihal Bhareti =

Sri Lankan radio personality

- Radio Ceylon announcer Nihal Bhareti in a studio in the 1960s
- Born: Sri Lanka
- Occupation: Radio Presenter with the SLBC
- Employer: Radio Ceylon/SLBC
- Known for: Joining Radio Ceylon in the 1960s and presenting programmes such as Radio Journal and Holiday Choice.
- Title: Former Director, English Services, Sri Lanka Broadcasting Corporation.
- Website: http://www.slbc.lk

Nihal Bhareti was a radio announcer with the Sri Lanka Broadcasting Corporation in Colombo. He joined Radio Ceylon in the 1960s.

Bhareti joined the station when it was popular across South Asia.

He was appointed by Livy Wijemanne who was by then Director of the Commercial Service of Radio Ceylon, and presented the magazine program Radio Journal for a decade. He became Director of English Services of the Sri Lanka Broadcasting Corporation in the 1980s.

== See also ==
- Vernon Corea
- Radio Ceylon
- Sri Lanka Broadcasting Corporation
- List of Sri Lankan broadcasters

== Bibliography ==
- Wavell, Stuart. - The Art of Radio - Training Manual written by the Director Training of the CBC. - Ceylon Broadcasting Corporation, 1969.
- Ceylon, Radio. - Standards of Broadcasting Practice - Commercial Broadcasting Division. - Radio Ceylon, 1950.
