= Kailayar Sellanainar Sivakumaran =

K. S. Sivakumaran
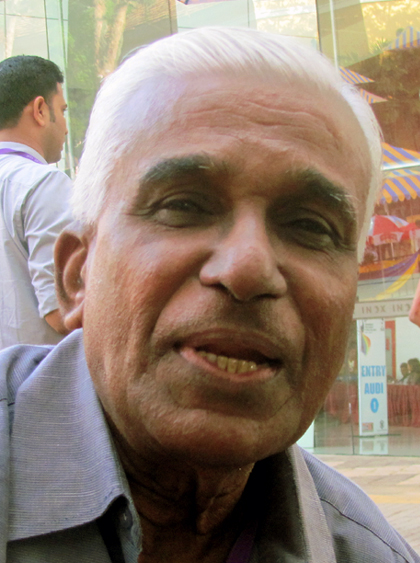
- Born: 1 October 1936; Singalavadi, Batticaloa, Sri Lanka
- Died: September 15, 2022 (aged 85); Colombo, Sri Lanka
- Education: St. Joseph's College, Colombo 10, Sri Lanka
- Occupations: Writer, Former Editor, Translator, and Teacher.
- Employer: Ceylon National Chamber of Industries
- Known for: Writer; art and literary critic; journalist
- Children: Raghuram Sivakumaran and Anantharam Sivakumaran.Grandchildren - Meera Siva, Shyama Siva, Maya Sivakumaran, Jay Sivakumaran

Kailayar Sellanainar Sivakumaran (also known as K. S. Sivakumaran; (October 1, 1936 – September 15, 2022) was a Sri Lankan Tamil writer, art and literary critic, Journalist and radio and television personality. He wrote and broadcast in both Tamil and English.

== Early life ==
Sivakumaran was born in Singalavadi, Puliyantheevu, Batticaloa City in the Eastern Province of Sri Lanka.

He had his early education at Aanaipanthy Boys’ School and St. Mary's Practicing School, St. Michael's College (then managed by North American Jesuits) and Government College all in, Batticaloa from 1947 to 1953. The family migrated to Colombo in October 1953. In Colombo; he studied up to the University Entrance Class (known as HSC) at the Colombo Hindu College (Bambalapitiya and Ratmalana) and at St. Joseph's College, Darley Road. He continued his education as an external student and graduated in English, Tamil and Western Classical Culture from the University of Peradeniya.

== Career ==
His working career includes as a journalist, broadcaster, Information Assistant (USIS), Copy Writer, English Teacher and a freelance literary and film critic.

Sivakumaran began his career as a journalist in 1960 working for a trade journal, Industry, now defunct. From 1961 to 1969 he was a translator of Tamil for the Local Government Service Commission (LGSC). In 1966, he was selected as a relief announcer in Tamil for the Commercial Service of the Sri Lanka Broadcasting Corporation SLBC (then known as Radio Ceylon) and news reader in Tamil and English. In April 1969 he joined the SLBC in a permanent capacity as a Tamil translator in the News Division. He was later appointed as an Assistant Editor and subsequently held the post of Duty Editor of the Tamil News Division of the SLBC. He served in this capacity until October 1979. Afterwards he joined the United States Information Service, now known as United States Information Agency (USIA), Colombo handling work in English as an assistant to the Information Officer.

As a writer both in English and Tamil media, he has published more than 30 books in Tamil and two books in English.

He worked as a journalist in "The Island" and "Daily News" - English language daily newspapers published from Colombo. He had worked as a senior journalist for "Virakesari: and Navamani" in the Tamil language.

== Death ==
Sivakumaran died in Colombo on 15 September 2022, at the age of 85.

== Awards and felicitations ==
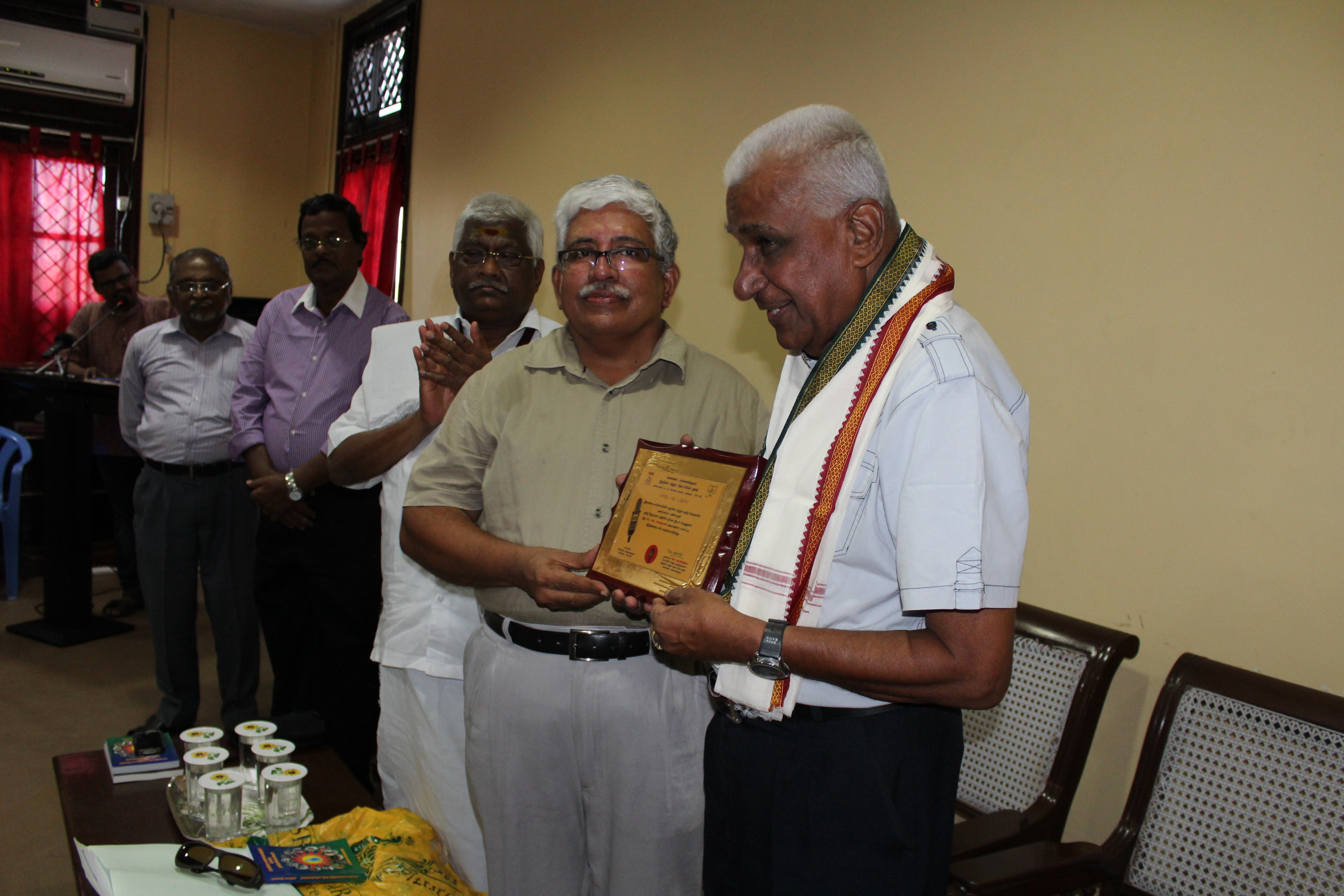

He had received many awards that include Best English Columnist for the year 2007 awarded by the Press Institute and College of Journalism. He is a visiting lecturer in academic institutions. He has travelled to many countries attending meetings, seminars etc. both as guest and participant.

He was awarded with the Lifetime Achievement Award by the sixth edition of the Jaffna International Cinema Festival in December 2020.

== List of books (available titles) ==
- Aspects of Culture in Sri Lanka
- Tamil Writing in Sri Lanka

The following are in Tamil language

- அசையும் படிமங்கள்
- அண்மைக்கால ஈழத்துச் சிறுகதைத் தொகுப்புகள் - பத்தி எழுத்துக்களும் பல் திரட்டுக்களும் - 04
- இந்திய - இலங்கை இலக்கியம் ஒரு கண்ணோட்டம்
- இருமை
- ஈழத்து எழுத்தாளர்கள் ஒரு விரிவான பார்வை
- ஈழத்து தமிழ் நாவல்களிற் சில திறனாய்வுக் குறிப்புகள் - பத்தி எழுத்துக்களும் பல் திரட்டுகளும் 06
- ஈழத்துச் சிறுகதைகளும் ஆசிரியர்களும் - ஒரு பன்முகப் பார்வை (1962-1979)
- ஈழத்துச் சிறுகதைகளும் ஆசிரியர்களும் - ஒரு பன்முகப் பார்வை (1980-1998)
- ஈழத்துச் சிறுகதைத் தொகுப்புகள்: திறனாய்வு - பத்தி எழுத்துக்களும் பல் திரட்டுகளும் 03
- ஒரு திறனாய்வாளரின் இலக்கியப் பார்வை ...
- காலக் கண்ணாடியில் ஒரு கலை இலக்கியப் பார்வை
- கே.எஸ்.சிவகுமாரன் ஏடுகளில் திறனாய்வு/மதிப்பீடுகள் சில
- கைலாசபதியும் நானும்
- சினமா! சினமா! ஓர் உலக வலம்
- சிவகுமாரன் கதைகள்
- சொன்னாற்போல - 1
- சொன்னாற்போல - 2
- சொன்னாற்போல - 3
- திறனாய்வு என்றால் என்ன?
- திறனாய்வுப் பார்வைகள் - பத்தி எழுத்துக்களும் பல் திரட்டுக்களும் - 01
- பண்டைய கிரேக்க முதன்மையாளர்கள்
- பிறமொழிச் சிறுகதைகள் சில
- மரபுவழித் திறனாய்வும் ஈழத்துத் தமிழ் இலக்கியமும் - பத்தி எழுத்துக்களும் பல் திரட்டுக்களும் 07
- மூன்று நூற்றாண்டுகளின் முன்னோடிச் சிந்தனைகள் - பத்தி எழுத்துக்களும் பல் திரட்டுக்களும் 05
- கலை இலக்கியப் பார்வைகள் (2014)

== See also ==
- The Legendary Announcers
- List of Sri Lankan broadcasters
- Sri Lanka Broadcasting Corporation
