= S. P. Mylvaganam =

Sri Lankan journalist

- Born: Colombo, Sri Lanka
- Occupation: Broadcaster

S. P. Mylvaganam (Tamil: எஸ். பி. மயில்வாகனம்) was a Sri Lankan radio broadcaster. He was the first Tamil language announcer for the Commercial Service of Radio Ceylon. He had fans across Sri Lanka and India.

== Vannakam ==
Listeners liked his relaxed style and they recognised his voice instantly when he uttered one word ' Vannakam ' - in Tamil, it means ' Welcome.' His wife, Chenthimani Mylvaganam, was the first lady news reader at Radio Ceylon. It was through his wife that Mr Mylvaganam was introduced to announcing. He presented a range of Tamil programmes on the Commercial Service. He was trained by the Australian administrator Clifford Dodd who came to work for Radio Ceylon under the Colombo Plan and by Livy Wijemanne.

== Iconic status ==
Mylvaganam belonged to that select band of announcers of Radio Ceylon who enjoyed iconic status in South Asia. Radio Ceylon, now the Sri Lanka Broadcasting Corporation, is the oldest radio station in the region.

He helped popularise Radio Ceylon in India - millions tuned into the station. In a time when announcers arose above narrow racial barriers, Mylvaganam had close friendships with Sinhala announcers who worked on the English and Sinhala services. He worked very closely with Vernon Corea on radio programmes and they shared ideas together. Mylvaganam was popular right across South Asia.

== Involvement with Tamil Stars from India ==
Mylvaganam was involved with Tamil stars of the time such as Shivaji Ganeshan, MGR and other stars. He and his wife brought MGR and Saroja Devi to Sri Lanka on his first visit in October 1965 to judge a beauty pageant in Kandy, sponsored by the Independent Newspapers Ltd. The day MGR and Saroja Devi visited Mylvaganan's residence in Colombo, the railway tracks, the streets, and the beach were spilling with crowds.

== Naan Kanda Sorgam (நான் கண்ட சொர்க்கம்) ==
In a 1960 Tamil film titled Naan Kanda Sorgam (நான் கண்ட சொர்க்கம்) scripted by K.S.Gopalakrishnan, comedian Thangavelu goes to heaven and when he meets God Indira he tries to show him the western song and he tunes the Radio the first thing he hears is the voice of Mylvaganam and says "Oh! He has arrived here too". This humorous quip indicated how much prominence and popularity Mylvaganam held during his era. He was the first Tamil Disc Jockey in the sense of Western radio.

== See also ==
- Vernon Corea
- Radio Ceylon
- Sri Lanka Broadcasting Corporation
- List of Sri Lankan broadcasters

== Bibliography ==
- Wavell, Stuart. - The Art of Radio - Training Manual written by the Director Training of the CBC. - Ceylon Broadcasting Corporation, 1969.
