= Bob Harvie (radio announcer) =

Sri Lankan radio announcer

- Born: 3 January; Colombo, Sri Lanka
- Died: 7 July 2010
- Occupation: Broadcaster/ Cricket / Rugby Commentator
- Employer: Radio Ceylon / Sri Lanka Broadcasting Corporation
- Known for: Broadcasting / cricket commentaries
- Title: Former Captain of the Ceylon Army.
- Spouse: Grace Harvie

Robert James Anthony Harvie Harvie was Sri Lankan announcer of Radio Ceylon. Harvie's voice was inextricably linked to cricket commentaries from the island of Ceylon. He has led the English cricket commentary team from Radio Ceylon and subsequently the Sri Lanka Broadcasting Corporation. Harvie has been a significant figure where cricket commentaries from Sri Lanka are concerned and he has been on the radio on Ceylon test matches against visiting England teams.

Bob Harvie has made his commentaries when the Ceylon team was captained by Anura Tennekoon and Michael Tissera. Bob Harvie was Ceylon's ' John Arlott' and enjoyed huge popularity as a cricket commentator, giving his ball by ball commentaries over Radio Ceylon, alongside other great Ceylonese commentators such as Norton Pereira. He gained a war service commission as a Second Lieutenant in the Ceylon Light Infantry, he retired as a captain in the Ceylon Volunteer Force.

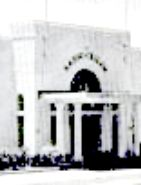
Bob Harvie was Radio Ceylon's outstanding cricket commentator, known as Sri Lanka's 'John Arlott'.

== The Royal-Thomian Encounter ==
Bob Harvie has also been on the Radio Ceylon, CBC commentary team covering the annual Royal–Thomian cricket match, the 'Battle of the Blues', the oldest unbroken Ceylonese cricket match between S. Thomas' College, Mount Lavinia and Royal College Colombo.

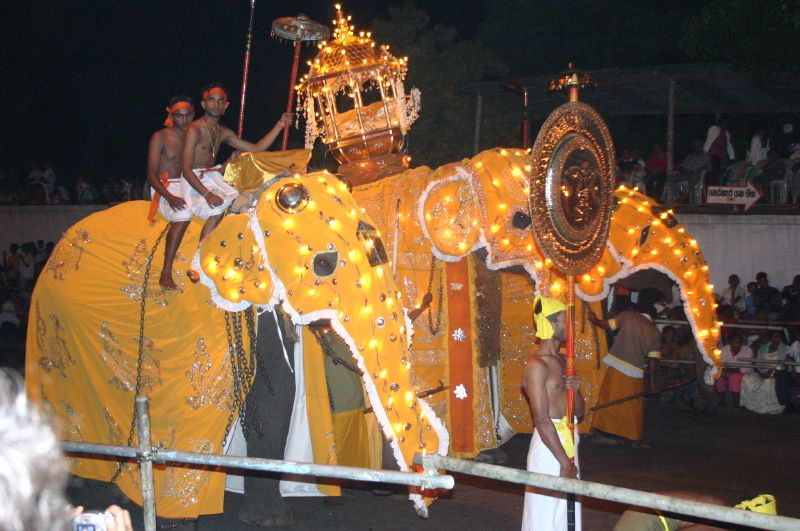
Bob Harvie commentated on the magnificent Esala Perahera held annually in July/August in Kandy. Dancers and caparisoned elephants made it a colourful occasion. Harvie always captured the atmosphere of the Kandy Perahera in his broadcasts on the airwaves of Radio Ceylon.

He was also known for covering the Kandy Perahara, Army Tattoo, Remembrance Day Parade as well as being in charge of Rugby and Boxing Commentaries over the airwaves of Radio Ceylon/Sri Lanka Broadcasting Corporation.

== The Art of Commentary ==
Sriyani de Silva, in an obituary published in the Sunday Times in Colombo observed: 'Bob Harvie was the toast of the sports world, when it came to the art of commentary! Apart from his impeccable diction and use of the appropriate and accurate facts, names and terminology – which he was an absolute stickler for – Bob was able to bring any event vividly alive to listeners island wide, and even in the sub-continent if I remember right, in those days when TV did not exist. His almost magical word-wizardry would encapsulate in his own inimitable style, all the excitement of a crucial rugby encounter, magnificent Independence parade, nail-biting motor sports event, beauty pageant or black tie dinner-dance. I think I can safely say, the likes of him has never been matched.'

Harvie lived in Sri Lanka until his death on 7 July 2010.

== See also ==
- Radio Ceylon
- Sri Lanka Broadcasting Corporation
- List of Sri Lankan broadcasters
- Esala Perahera
