= List of Sri Lankan broadcasters =

This list of Sri Lankan broadcasters includes notable broadcasters from the country of Sri Lanka.

== A ==
- Chitrananda Abeysekera
- Karunaratne Abeysekera

== B ==
- K. S. Balachandran
- Leon Belleth
- Nihal Bhareti
- Jimmy Bharucha

== C ==
- Vernon Corea
- Vijaya Corea

== D ==
- Owen de Abrew
- Premakeerthi De Alwis
- Asoka de Silva
- Dayananda de Silva
- Sugathapala De Silva
- A.W.Dharmapala
- KDK Dharmawardena

== F ==
- Elmo Fernando
- Eric Fernando
- Prosper Fernando

== G ==
- Christopher Greet
- H.M.Gunasekera
- Dayananda Gunawardena
- Thevis Guruge

== H ==
- B. H. Abdul Hameed
- Bob Harvie
- Tim Horshington

== J ==
- Tilak Jayaratne
- Mervyn Jayasuriya
- Sumana Jayatillake

== K ==
- Kanishka Meegasmulla

== M ==
- S.P.Mylvaganam

== P ==
- Eardley Peiris
- Norton Pereira
- Palitha Perera
- Shirley Perera

== R ==
- Prabha Ranatunge
- Greg Roskowski

== S ==
- Seelaratna Senarath
- Kailayar Sellanainar Sivakumaran
- Satsorupavathy Nathan

== V ==
- Vasantha Vaidyanathan

== W ==
- Livy Wijemanne
