= Goolbai Gunasekara =

Sri Lankan educator and writer

Goolbai Gunasekara is a Sri Lankan writer, educator, speaker and newspaper editor. She is regarded as a well-known educationist in Sri Lanka. She was the founder principal of the Asian International School.She was known to rule the school with an iron fist.

== Biography ==
She hails from a humble, well-to-do family background, as both her parents Kewal Motwani and Clara Heath excelled in their educational aspects. She was born to an Indian father and American mother. She initially pursued her primary education at the Buddhist Ladies' College and she later switched to Bishop's College, where she spent majority of her schooling years. She also attended the Ooty Convent during her brief stay in India. She also ended up studying at Jaffna Hindu Ladies' College for a duration of two years.

== Career ==
Goolbai obtained her Honorary degree in English Literature and obtained her Honour's degree in history. She was invited by renowned entrepreneur and founder of Asian International School, W. P. Perera, to be the first principal of Asian International School. According to few reliable sources, she has apparently assisted W. P. Perera to establish Asian International School in 1989 and she continued to serve as an important pillar of the school since its inception. She served as a schoolteacher for over five decades. She has also made rapid strides in contributing to the wellbeing of the students in Sri Lanka through the establishment of a proper structural framework to pave the way for English education in the country.

She published a book titled Chosen Ground: The Clara Motwani Saga, which was based on her mother's life Clara Motwani, who was a pioneering educationist in Sri Lanka. She has also written journal articles for The Island and The Sunday Times. Her satirical literary works, including Up Sigiriya with Kitkat, It's the Escalator I Can't Manage and Life can be a Frolic have featured in the Daily News publications. She has published books on various subject matters and themes including history, education, humour and family biography. She has also been invited as keynote speaker at women's gatherings, conferences, workshops, clubs. During her illustrious career, she has gained a reputation for her efforts as a writer through appreciation of fellow prominent Sri Lankan writers Yasmine Gooneratne, Jean Arasanayagam and Arthur C. Clarke.

In 2016, she received the Zonta Award for Woman of Excellence in Education. In the same year, she also received the Gold Award of Inspirational Woman of the Year. She published a book titled The Principal Factor in 2021, which was a collection of several articles written by her over several years for the Lanka Monthly Digest magazine. She has written about her personal experiences and perceptions of reflecting on the mistakes in the current education system in Sri Lanka in The Principal Factor. She has also been a regular contributor to the LMD magazine, where she often emphasizes the important aspects of the education sector in Sri Lanka.
