= H. M. Gunasekera =

Sri Lankan broadcaster

H.M. Gunasekera was a Sri Lankan broadcaster with Radio Ceylon, and subsequently the Sri Lanka Broadcasting Corporation.

HM, as he was known as in the station, was one of the first Sinhala radio announcers. He read the Sinhala news and presented a range of radio programs over the Commercial Service.

He eventually led the radio station, the oldest in South Asia. He also chaired some key media conferences in the capital city Colombo.

== See also ==
- Vernon Corea
