= Prosper Fernando =

- Radio Ceylon and SLBC Announcer
- Born: Colombo, Sri Lanka
- Occupation: Broadcaster
- Employer: Radio Ceylon/Sri Lanka Broadcasting Corporation
- Known for: Broadcasting

Prosper Fernando was a longstanding announcer with Radio Ceylon, the oldest radio station in South Asia. Fernando presented some of Radio Ceylon's most popular radio programs such as Housewives' Choice and Holiday Choice. Thousands tuned into the programs on the island.

Fernando was a news reader, presenting the English news bulletins of Radio Ceylon. He was also an announcer on the Sinhala Service of the Sri Lanka Broadcasting Corporation.

== See also ==
- Radio Ceylon
- Sri Lanka Broadcasting Corporation
- List of Sri Lankan broadcasters

== Bibliography ==
- Wavell, Stuart. - The Art of Radio - Training Manual written by the Director Training of the CBC. - Ceylon Broadcasting Corporation, 1969.
