= Ranatunge =

Ranatunge is a given name and surname. Notable people with the name include:

- Ranatunge Karunananda (1936–1974) Sri Lankan athlete
- Prabha Ranatunge (1926-2017), Sri Lankan radio personality
