= Shirley Perera =

Radio announcer

- Born: Colombo, Sri Lanka
- Occupation: Broadcaster
- Employer: Radio Ceylon / Sri Lanka Broadcasting Corporation
- Known for: Broadcasting
- Title: Director of English Services

Shirley Perera was a popular announcer of the 1960s and 1970s in Radio Ceylon - the oldest radio station in South Asia. Perera presented some of the well known radio programmes of the station including 'You call the Tune.'

Millions of listeners turned into the radio programmes broadcast over the airwaves of Radio Ceylon and subsequently the Sri Lanka Broadcasting Corporation.

Shirley Perera also climbed the management ladder of the SLBC he was appointed Director of the English Services in the early 1980s in Sri Lanka.

== See also ==
- Radio Ceylon
- Sri Lanka Broadcasting Corporation
- List of Sri Lankan broadcasters

== Bibliography ==
- Wavell, Stuart. - The Art of Radio - Training Manual written by the Director Training of the CBC. - Ceylon Broadcasting Corporation, 1969.
