= Eardley Peiris =

- Born: Colombo, Sri Lanka
- Occupation: Broadcaster
- Employer: Radio Ceylon / Sri Lanka Broadcasting Corporation
- Known for: Broadcasting

Eardley Peiris was a radio announcer with Radio Ceylon who joined the radio station in the late 1950s and enjoyed huge popularity with millions of listeners across South Asia. He presented some of the key radio programs like Holiday Choice, he also read the English news bulletins of Radio Ceylon.

Peiris and the select band of announcers of Radio Ceylon enjoyed iconic status in South Asia. Radio Ceylon ruled the airwaves in the 1950s and 1960s.

== See also ==
- Radio Ceylon
- Sri Lanka Broadcasting Corporation
- List of Sri Lankan broadcasters

== Bibliography ==
- Wavell, Stuart. - The Art of Radio - Training Manual written by the Director Training of the CBC. - Ceylon Broadcasting Corporation, 1969.
