= Tim Horshington =

Sri Lankan radio broadcaster

- Born: Colombo, Sri Lanka
- Died: 8 May 2002; Toronto, Ontario, Canada
- Occupation: Broadcaster
- Employer: Radio Ceylon / Sri Lanka Broadcasting Corporation
- Known for: Broadcasting

Timothy Navaratnam Horshington was a pioneering broadcaster of Radio Ceylon, the oldest radio station in South Asia. Horshington was one of the earliest Tamil announcers to be appointed to the panel of announcers in the 1950s by Livy Wijemanne and Clifford Dodd. He was very popular with listeners on the island - Ceylonese enjoyed listening to his mellow voice over Radio Ceylon - the radio station ruled the airwaves in the 1950s and 1960s in South Asia.

Tim Horshington was sent to Australia in 1952-1953 on training placement with the Macquarie Broadcasting Service in Sydney.

He presented radio programs such as 'Ponds Hit Parade,' and 'Holiday Choice' over the airwaves of Radio Ceylon.

He died on 8 May 2002 in Toronto, Ontario, Canada.

== See also ==
- Radio Ceylon
- Vernon Corea
- Sri Lanka Broadcasting Corporation
- List of Sri Lankan broadcasters

== Bibliography ==
- Wavell, Stuart. - The Art of Radio - Training Manual written by the Director Training of the CBC. - Ceylon Broadcasting Corporation, 1969.
