= Karunaratne Abeysekera =

Sri Lankan poet (1930–1983)

- Born: 3 June 1930; Colombo, British Ceylon
- Died: 20 April 1983 (aged 52)
- Education: Nalanda College Colombo
- Occupation: Broadcaster
- Employer: Radio Ceylon/Sri Lanka Broadcasting Corporation
- Known for: Poetry, Songwriting and Scriptwriting
- Spouse: Erani Abeysekara
- Children: Dileepa Abeysekara

Karunaratne Abeysekera (3 June 1930 – 20 April 1983) was one of Sri Lanka's most famous Sinhala broadcasters. He was also a poet and songwriter and was widely admired for his excellent command of Sinhala.

Abeysekera wrote the lyrics to over 2,000 songs, a record for a lyricist in Sri Lanka. His compositions are still covered by some of the island's top musicians to this day, introducing his lyrics to new audiences in South Asia, and his songs are played regularly by the Sri Lanka Broadcasting Corporation.

== Early years ==
Abeysekera was born on 3 June 1930 in Ratmale near Matara in Southern Sri Lanka. He was educated at Nalanda College Colombo. Some of his notable classmates at Nalanda College were Dr Gunadasa Amarasekara, Stanley Jayasinghe, Dr Harischandra Wijayatunga, Dr Hudson Silva, Hon. Rupa Karunathilake, Hon. Dr Dharmasena Attygalle, Dr Henry Jayasena, Bernie Wijesekera. Siri Perera was Abeysekera's Sinhala language teacher at Nalanda.

He was discovered by the children's radio programme Ḷamā Piṭiya ("Children's Field") hosted by Siri Aiya (also known as U.A.S. Perera - Siri Perera QC) and broadcast over Radio Ceylon, the oldest radio station in South Asia. Ḷamā Piṭiya was a showcase for young talents, and Abeysekera performed with his poems on the Radio Ceylon programme in the 1940s. He was an instant hit with the general public and remained a pop icon until his death.

His younger brother Daya Abeysekara was a renowned journalist and an actor. He died on 29 March 2019 at the age of 80. The funeral was held on 31 March 2019 at Kanatte Cemetery.

== A teenage broadcaster ==
Abeysekera was a pioneering Sinhala broadcaster. He was a rare breed, a "teenage broadcaster" launching a broadcasting career with Radio Ceylon, which he joined in 1950 at the age of 20. In 1958 he was sent to London for specialist broadcasting training with the BBC. Studio 5 of the Sri Lanka Broadcasting Corporation has been named after him.

== Career ==
Abeysekera was an announcer, compere, lyricist, dialogue writer, and poet - he also wrote children's stories. He worked very closely with another famous broadcaster, Vernon Corea. It was one of the most productive radio partnerships in Sri Lanka. His songs have been sung by a range of musicians, among them Pundit Amaradeva, Nanda Malini, H. R. Jothipala, Milton Mallawarachchi, J. A. Milton Perera and Mignonne Fernando and the Jetliners. Karunaratne Abeysekera won the prestigious Sarasaviya Awards for his lyrics on two occasions. The Government of Sri Lanka named a road after him in the capital city of Colombo.

== Pioneer Sinhala cricket commentator ==
Abeysekera made history in the world of radio by being the first cricket commentator using the Sinhala language. He commentated on matches played by Ceylon against visiting English, Indian and Australian teams from the 1950s to the 1970s. He also commentated on local cricket matches. He had to devise cricket terminology to describe cricketing actions - this was uncharted territory in Sinhala; his words to describe various aspects of cricket are used to this day.

== Quote on Karunaratne Abeysekera ==
Karu (...) has won many awards for his lyrics and achievements in broadcasting and allied fields. Through his children's programmes of the then Radio Ceylon (now SLBC) thousands of young people were able to display their talent and a large number of them later became popular (...). Karu loved cricket.

— Daily News (Colombo)

== See also ==
- Radio Ceylon
- Sri Lanka Broadcasting Corporation
- List of cricket commentators
- List of Sri Lankan broadcasters

== Bibliography ==
- Cricket and National Identity in the Postcolonial Age, [Hardcover], Stephen Wagg (Editor), Publisher: Routledge; 1 edition (7 July 2005), ISBN 0-415-36348-9
