= Vasantha Vaidyanathan =

- வசந்தா வைத்தியநாதன்
- Born: 1937; Mayiladuthurai, Tamil Nadu, India
- Died: 14 March 2018 (aged 80–81); Colombo, Sri Lanka
- Occupation(s): Religious Preacher, Commentator, Broadcaster
- Known for: Religious Preaching

Vasantha Vaidyanathan (Tamil: வசந்தா வைத்தியநாதன்) (1937 – 14 March 2018) was an Indian born Sri Lankan Hindu religious activist and a Tamil radio broadcaster who was well known for her services to the Hindu society as a religious preacher. She has worked as a radio broadcaster for several Hindu religious festivals including the Chariot festivals in the Sri Muthumariamman Temple, Matale. She died on the early morning of 14 March 2018, at a hospital in Colombo, aged 80.

== See also ==
- List of Sri Lankan broadcasters
