= Prabha Ranatunge =

Sri Lankan radio personality

- Born: Prabha Perera; 1926
- Died: 5 May 2017 (aged 90–91)
- Resting place: Borella
- Other names: Prabha Perera, Prabha Prathibawa
- Occupation: Radio personality
- Spouse: Ranatunge
- Children: 3

Prabha Ranatunge (1926-2017), also known as Prabha Perera, was a Sri Lankan radio personality who was the first Sinhala female announcer in Sri Lanka. She joined Radio Ceylon in the 1950s as the first ever woman announcer for the station. After her marriage, she worked as a radio announcer with the name Prabha Ranatunge.

== Death ==
Ranatunge died on 5 May 2017. Her remains are lying at the Jayaratne funeral parlour in Borella.

== See also ==
- List of Sri Lankan broadcasters
