= Norton Pereira =

Norton Pereira was a broadcaster with Radio Ceylon and subsequently the Sri Lanka Broadcasting Corporation.

He made his mark as a top class cricket commentator with the SLBC, commentating in English - he covered most of the international and national fixtures for the SLBC including schools cricket matches.

== See also ==
- Radio Ceylon
- Sri Lanka Broadcasting Corporation
- List of cricket commentators
- SLBC-creating new waves of history
- Eighty Years of Broadcasting in Sri Lanka
