= Radio SEAC =

Radio SEAC was the war time radio station operated by the Allied South East Asia Command (SEAC) that took over the operations of Colombo Radio, a Ceylon radio station launched in 1925. Radio programmes were broadcast across Asia to the allied forces and to the people of India and South Asia.

Radio SEAC was handed over to the Colonial Government of after World War II who changed the name to Radio Ceylon. The station is the oldest radio station in Asia (world's second oldest). Millions tuned into Radio SEAC and subsequently Radio Ceylon.

== See also ==
- Radio Ceylon
