= Greg Roskowski =

Sri Lankan radio personality

Greg Roszkowski
- Died: Colombo
- Occupation: Presenter–announcer with Radio Ceylon
- Employer: Government of Sri Lanka
- Known for: Presenting 'Binaca Hit Parade' on the Commercial Service of Radio Ceylon
- Children: 5
- Relatives: Owned the Nippon Hotel in Colombo
- Website: www.slbc.lk

Greg Roszkowski was an announcer of Radio Ceylon during the height of the station's popularity in the 1950s in the Indian Subcontinent. Roskowski, born of a Japanese mother and a Polish father, was the booming voice of Radio Ceylon's morning radio programs.

The Roszkowski family at one time also owned and ran Hotel Nippon, a middle-budget hotel and restaurant, situated in the commercial heart of Colombo. Hotel Nippon has one of the earliest oriental restaurants and it exists to this day, in downtown Colombo.

According to one-time radio colleague Jimmy Bharucha, Greg Roszkowski used to receive fan mail of over 500 letters a day. Listeners to Radio Ceylon enjoyed his 'wakey wakey' style and he introduced the hit songs of Frank Sinatra, Dean Martin, Sammy Davis Junior, Bill Haley & His Comets, Cliff Richard and Elvis Presley to audiences in Ceylon and beyond.

Greg Roszkowski was known as 'Happy-go-lucky-Greg' over the airwaves of Radio Ceylon. He was immensely popular on the Commercial Service of Radio Ceylon and the All Asia Service where he presented a countdown of English pop music called the Binanca Hit Parade.

Indian listeners of Greg Roskowski's programme then wrote into the station in the thousands clamouring for a countdown programme of Hindi filmi songs since All India Radio had banned Bollywood music. Binaca Geetmala, presented by Ameen Sayani, was the outcome – it became an iconic radio programme over the airwaves of Radio Ceylon.

Greg Roszkowski was one of a handful of 'overseas announcers' working for Radio Ceylon in the 1950s and 1960s when the station ruled the airwaves in the Indian Subcontinent; the others being the American Craig Thompson who co-presented the Kiddies Corner, a program for children and Ameen Syani from India, who presented Binaca Geet Mala, a program of Indian filmi music.

== See also ==
- Radio Ceylon
- Sri Lanka Broadcasting Corporation
- List of Sri Lankan broadcasters
- Kiddies Corner

== Bibliography ==
- Wavell, Stuart. - The Art of Radio - Training Manual written by the Director Training of the CBC. - Ceylon Broadcasting Corporation, 1969.
