= Clifford Dodd =

Radio expert and administrator

Clifford R.Dodd
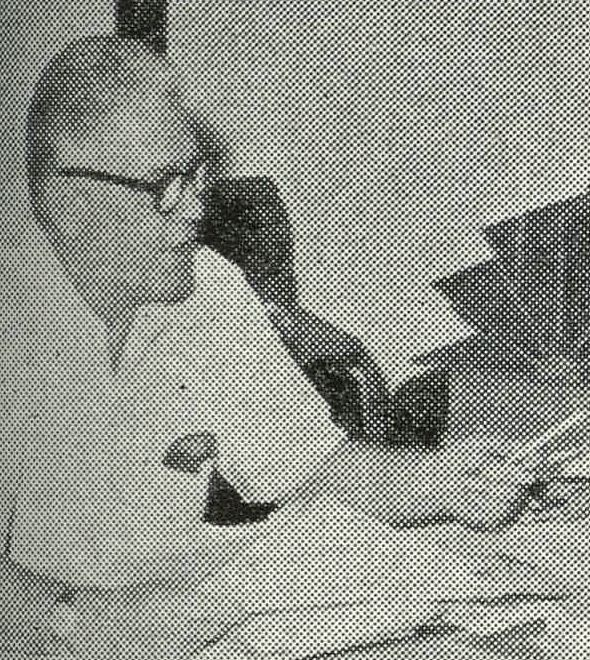
- The Father of Commercial Broadcasting in Ceylon, 1958
- Born: 24 July 1905; Wellington, New Zealand
- Died: 14 June 1971 (aged 65); Gorokan, New South Wales, Australia
- Occupation: Radio Administrator
- Employer: The Government of Ceylon
- Known for: Founding the Commercial Service of Radio Ceylon
- Title: Director, Commercial Service of Radio Ceylon (contracted under the Colombo Plan)
- Successor: Livy Wijemanne
- Parent: Ernest Henry Dodd (father)

Clifford R. Dodd (24 July 1905 – 14 June 1971) was an administrator and radio expert, with twenty years of experience in broadcasting in Australia, before he arrived in Sri Lanka. The Australian Government sent him under the Colombo Plan to work in Radio Ceylon. He was appointed Director of the newly formed Commercial Service of Radio Ceylon.

In July 1951, they established the Colombo Plan to provide economic aid to areas of south and southeast Asia. Their headquarters are in Colombo, the former capital city of Sri Lanka.

== Founder of the Commercial Service ==
Dodd, arriving in Colombo in the early 1950s, soon created the infrastructure of the Commercial Service of Radio Ceylon and made it into a successful brand. Dodd handpicked some of the best Ceylonese talents near him and trained them as broadcasters. The announcers trained in the 1950s by Clifford Dodd and Livy Wijemanne went on to become notable announcers of the Commercial Service of Radio Ceylon, among them Vernon Corea, Tim Horshington, Greg Roskowski, Jimmy Bharucha, Christopher Greet, and others. One of Dodd's protégés, Vernon Corea, was appointed as the BBC's Ethnic Minorities Adviser—the first Asian to be appointed to senior management at the BBC in 1978. It was under Dodd's tenure that the Indian announcer Ameen Sayani was brought into launch Binaca Geetmala, a countdown of Hindi filmi music on the All Asia Service. It enjoyed iconic status across India.

The training at Radio Ceylon was rigorous, as Dodd wanted the highest standards in broadcasting. He had the rare honour of being immortalised in a cartoon by the famous Sri Lankan cartoonist Aubrey Collette, titled 'Odd Man Dodd.'

== Radio Ceylon – King of the Airwaves ==
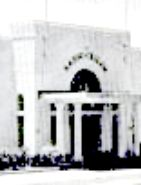
Clifford Dodd is known as the 'Father of Commercial Broadcasting' in Ceylon. He turned the Commercial Service into a huge money spinner for the station. Radio Ceylon was known as the 'King of Airwaves' in the Indian sub-continent.

Dodd created a positive business environment in Radio Ceylon. His arrival in Torrington Square created a real buzz in broadcasting circles in Ceylon. Clifford R.Dodd changed the face of broadcasting in the island. He upgraded the Hindi Service of Radio Ceylon. Millions of listeners in the Indian sub-continent wrote in and tuned into the radio station, the oldest in South Asia. Dodd was a prime mover in attracting advertisers who were aiming at the vast Indian market via the medium of radio.

== Dodd's "Tough New Measures" ==
Dodd brought in what some called tough new measures, of which some were not popular. He maintained that some Radio Ceylon staff, including the announcers who were on the payroll, were not entitled to permanency, or to retire on a pension. Radio Ceylon announcer, Mervyn Jayasuriya, observed: 'His credo as I have said before, was Hire and Fire.' Dodd claimed at a meeting with Radio Ceylon Director General John Lampson, and a senior civil servant Mr. M. Rajendra, who was Permanent Secretary to the Minister of Broadcasting, that an officer was entitled to a pension if that officer had served the government for one or two decades. If however an announcer lost his voice during that period, he would be unable to work, and Radio Ceylon should have the ability to get rid of him, argued the Director of the Commercial Service. Mervyn Jayasuriya who presented the case for the announcers said: "Gentlemen, just as an announcer might lose his voice and so become a liability, so can a surgeon lose his eyesight, and a Director or Administrator lose his sanity and become useless to the service of the State. Is there a little bias here, or am I just being silly?" The announcers won the day.

== The Father of Commercial Broadcasting in Ceylon ==
Clifford R. Dodd is widely regarded as the Father of Commercial Broadcasting in Sri Lanka. Under his stewardship, Radio Ceylon reached the pinnacle of fame, fortune and popularity – millions of rupees poured into the station as a result of the success of the Commercial Service.

Dodd returned to Australia after his Colombo Plan assignment. He was succeeded by the first Ceylonese Director of the Commercial Service of Radio Ceylon, Livy Wijemanne.

== See also ==
- Vernon Corea
- Colombo Plan
- Radio Ceylon
- Sri Lanka Broadcasting Corporation

== Bibliography ==
- Ceylon, Radio. – Standards of Broadcasting Practice – Commercial Broadcasting Division. – Radio Ceylon, 1950.
