= A. W. Dharmapala =

Sri Lankan broadcaster (born 1904)

A.W. Dharmapala was a pioneering broadcaster and Outside Broadcast Engineer of Radio Ceylon, the oldest radio station in South Asia, for 42 years (1922-1964). With the help of the engineers from Radio Ceylon, he was able to convert the radio equipment from a German submarine, captured during World War I, into a 0.5 kw radio transmitter. Using this, the first experimental broadcasts, playing gramophone music, were conducted in 1923 from the Central Telegraph Department. On December 16, 1925, barely three years after the BBC was inaugurated in England, Ceylon became the first British colony in Southeast Asia to begin regular, official radio broadcasts. In 1929 Dharmapala's was the first Sinhala voice heard over the airwaves of Radio Ceylon, broadcasting the words Colombin katha karami (This is Colombo calling). In 1954, he was appointed as assistant engineer for Radio Ceylon.

Dharmapala pioneered the way with outside broadcasts and was fully involved in the Buddha Jayanti activities all over the island. Dharmapala's technical expertise was invaluable to Radio Ceylon.

== See also ==
- Radio Ceylon
