= Penny Von Eschen =

American historian

Penny Marie Von Eschen is an American historian and Professor of History and William R. Kenan Jr. Professor of American Studies at the University of Virginia. She is known for her works on American and African-American history, American diplomacy, the history of music, and their connections with decolonization.

== Education and career ==
Von Eschen graduated from Northwestern University with a bachelor's degree in philosophy in 1982. She completed a Ph.D. from the department of history at Columbia University in 1994; her dissertation was African-Americans and colonialism, 1937–1957: The rise and fall of the politics of the African diaspora.

She was an assistant professor of history at the University of Iowa from 1994 to 1996, and at the University of Texas at Austin from 1996 to 1999. Next, she became an associate professor of history and American culture at the University of Michigan, and was promoted to professor there in 2006. In 2015 she moved to Cornell University as the L. Sanford and Jo Mills Reis Professor of Humanities, before moving again to Virginia.

== Books ==
Von Eschen's book on trumpeter Louis Armstrong and the Jazz ambassadors program of the United States Department of State, Satchmo Blows Up the World: Jazz Ambassadors Play the Cold War (2004) was first runner-up for the John Hope Franklin Publication Prize for the Best Book in American Studies in 2005. A feature-length documentary film, The Jazz Ambassadors (2018), was inspired in part by the book, and Von Eschen herself appears as a commentator in the film.

She also wrote Race against Empire: Black Americans and Anticolonialism, 1937–1957 (1997). Von Eschen is coeditor of Contested Democracy: Freedom, Race, and Power in American History (2007) and of American Studies: An Anthology (2009).
