= Christopher Greet =

Sri Lankan actor and radio presenter (1932–2020)

- Born: 12 June 1932; Ceylon
- Died: 28 December 2020 (aged 88)
- Occupations: Actor, radio presenter
- Years active: 1957–2010

Christopher Arthur Greet (12 June 1932 – 28 December 2020) was a Sri Lankan actor and radio presenter. He is best known for his work alongside Victoria Wood in the 1998 BBC comedy series dinnerladies.

== Early life ==
Greet was born in Ceylon on 12 June 1932.

== Career ==
Greet presented radio programmes with Radio Ceylon, the oldest radio station in South Asia. He later became an actor. One of his earliest roles was as a British officer in the wartime epic film The Bridge on the River Kwai with Sir Alec Guinness, which was filmed in Ceylon. He also appeared in several plays in Colombo alongside great Ceylonese actors such as Lucien de Zoysa.

His final acting credit was in the 2010 action film, Prince of Persia: The Sands of Time.

== Filmography ==
Year	Title	Role	Notes
1957	The Bridge on the River Kwai	British officer	Uncredited
1967	Sorungeth Soru		
1978	Rampage	Martin Squires	
1995	Funny Bones	Lawrence Berger	
1996	The Governor	Wilfred Samuels	Television series
1996	On Dangerous Ground	Chao Lin	
1998-1999	dinnerladies	Mr. Michael	7 episodes
1999	Alice in Wonderland	White Castle	Television film
2001	The Infinite Worlds of H.G. Wells	Club Servant Jones	6 episodes
2003	Dinotopia	Elder	2 episodes
2009	No Signal		Television series
2010	Prince of Persia: The Sands of Time	Regent of Alamut	

== Personal life and death ==
Greet lived in London. He played an active role with the Sri Lanka Christian Association in the United Kingdom. Greet died in December 2020.

== See also ==
- Vernon Corea
- SLBC-creating new waves of history
- Eighty Years of Broadcasting in Sri Lanka
