= Jimmy Bharucha =

- Born: Colombo, Sri Lanka
- Died: 12 June 2005; Colombo, Sri Lanka
- Education: St. Peter's College, Colombo
- Occupation: Broadcaster
- Employer: Radio Ceylon / Sri Lanka Broadcasting Corporation
- Known for: Broadcasting
- Title: Former Director News/Director Foreign Relations

Jimmy Bharucha was a Sri Lankan Parsi broadcaster called a 'colossus in Sri Lanka's broadcasting world'. Bharucha died in Colombo on 12 June 2005.

Bharucha who was educated at St. Peter's College, Colombo, had a career in broadcasting spanning 46 years. He was a pioneer of Radio Ceylon and the Sri Lanka Broadcasting Corporation and his velvet voice was popular not only in Sri Lanka but across the Indian sub-continent.

== The Commercial Service of Radio Ceylon ==
Bharucha joined the Commercial Service of Radio Ceylon on September 17, 1951, the station is the oldest in South Asia. Bharucha joined the Commercial Service under the stewardship of Clifford Dodd, who arrived in Ceylon to become the Director of the Commercial Service — Dodd was seconded to Ceylon under the Colombo Plan. Jimmy Bharucha joined the great announcers of Radio Ceylon playing western music. The entire radio station consisted of 45 members of staff including announcers in 1951. He presented some popular programmes including 'Crookes Hit Parade, Film Magazine, Take It Or Leave It, Melodies and Memories' among them. Radio Ceylon was 'King of the Airwaves,' in the 1950s and 1960s - millions tuned into the radio station - right across South Asia.

== Senior management at the SLBC ==
Jimmy Bharucha was appointed to senior management positions — as Director of News and Director of Foreign Relations — he was also Director/Secretary to the Board with the Sri Lanka Broadcasting Corporation.

== See also ==
- Radio Ceylon
- Sri Lanka Broadcasting Corporation
- List of Sri Lankan Broadcasters
