= Jaffna Hindu Ladies' College =

Location
- Arasady Road, Kantharmadam; Jaffna, Jaffna District, Northern Province; Sri Lanka
- Coordinates: 9°40′46.70″N 80°01′06.90″E

Information
- School type: Public provincial 1AB
- Motto: "It ought to be beautiful, I live here"
- Founded: 1943
- Founder: Visaladchy Ammal Sivagurunathar
- School district: Jaffna Education Zone
- Authority: Northern Provincial Council
- School number: 1002003
- Principal: Sumathy Kanthasamy
- Teaching staff: 84
- Grades: 1-13
- Gender: Girls
- Age range: 5-18
- Website: www.jaffnahlc.com

Jaffna Hindu Ladies' College (abbreviated as JHLC) is a provincial school in Jaffna, Sri Lanka.

== History ==
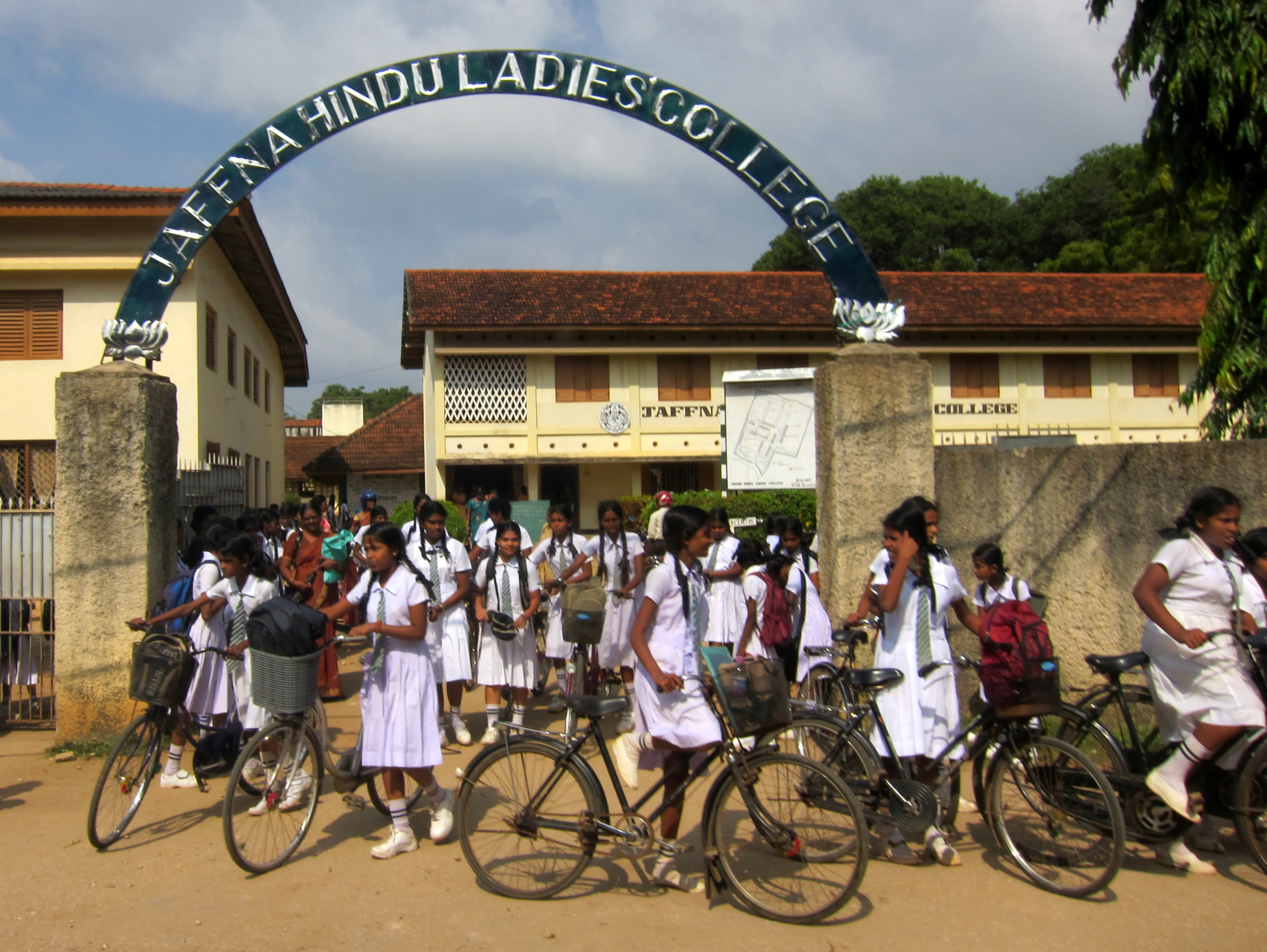
The school today

In 1935 the Jaffna Hindu College started admitting girls. On 10 September 1943 the Board of Management of Jaffna Hindu College and Affiliated Schools established a separate girls school - Jaffna Hindu Ladies College. This was the first girls "Hindu" school. JHLC was initially located at "Ponnalayam", the home of Sivagurunathar Ponnusamy. JHLC's growth necessitated larger premises and on 27 February 1944 JHLC moved to buildings at Jaffna Hindu College's playgrounds.

In 1941 Visaladchy Ammal Sivagurunathar, the founder of JHLC, donated land at "Naduththoddam", Arasady Road to the college. The founders husband Ramalingam Sivagurunathar and his niece Mrs. Valliammal Sivaguru also donated land to JHLC, including the Rajavarothaya Pillaiyar Temple. On 7 September 1945 JHLC moved to the Arasady Road site. In 1978 a new school, Jaffna Hindu Ladies' Primary School, catering for grades 1 to 5 was established next to JHLC.

== See also ==
- List of schools in Northern Province, Sri Lanka
