= Livy Wijemanne =

Sri Lankan broadcasting executive

- Veteran broadcaster Livy Wijemanne
- Born: 1917; Sri Lanka
- Died: 24 November 2002 (aged 84–85); Colombo
- Education: Royal College, Colombo
- Occupation: broadcasting / television executive
- Employer: The Government of Sri Lanka
- Known for: The first Ceylonese Director of the Commercial Service of Radio Ceylon
- Title: Chairman of the Sri Lanka Broadcasting Corporation (SLBC)
- Predecessor: Clifford Dodd, Director of the Commercial Service of Radio Ceylon

Livy Wijemanne (1917 – 2002) was a pioneer of Radio Ceylon. He was one of Sri Lanka's greatest broadcasters. On 31 October 1948, the Post Master General (who was also the Director of Broadcasting) appointed the young announcer as an Assistant Controller of Programmes. This was a start of his career in management in Radio Ceylon – the oldest radio station in South Asia.

Noel Cruz writing in the 'Island' newspaper observed: 'The Broadcasting station that had moved from Cotta Road to Torrington Square needed drive and Wijemanne provided it. He identified talent, welcomed new broadcasters and any experiments in presentation. It was Livy who first mapped out the logistics of 'Outside broadcasts', especially of the entertainment programmes relayed from the big hotels.'

== Colombo Plan Scholar ==
After completing his secondary education at Royal College, Colombo, Livy Wijemanne came on a Colombo Plan scholarship to the United Kingdom in early 1953, he was a member of the first batch of Colombo Plan Scholars from Ceylon. He worked with the famous John Arlott in Scotland, Wales and London. The BBC chose Wijemanne to occupy a seat assigned to a Commonwealth broadcasters at the Coronation of Queen Elizabeth on 2 June 1953 at Westminster Abbey. Wijemanne was invited by the British Council to reply to the toast of the Commonwealth proposed by the Chancellor of the Exchequer Mr Richard Mauldling at the Coronation Civic dinner at North Garnet.

== Director Commercial Service of Radio Ceylon ==
In 1955 the Government of Ceylon made Livy Wijemanne the assistant director of the Commercial Service of Radio Ceylon, he became the first Ceylonese Director of Radio Ceylon in 1956, succeeding Clifford R. Dodd. Wijemanne worked very closely with the Australian administrator, Clifford Dodd who came to Radio Ceylon under the Colombo Plan. Dodd changed the face of the Commercial Service of Radio Ceylon turning it into an international brand – he was ably supported by Livy Wijemanne who recruited some of Ceylon's best talents – they were trained by Dodd and Wijemanne and were Ceylon's pioneering professional broadcasters. Millions of listeners tuned into Radio Ceylon. The station was the most popular radio station in South Asia in the 1950s and 1960s. Radio Ceylon ruled the airwaves in South Asia, the station was by far the most popular brand name in the Asian region and people listened to Radio Ceylon from Pakistan to Burma – sometimes the station was picked up by listeners as far as the United States of America.

== Sri Lanka Broadcasting Corporation ==
In January 1984 Livy was appointed Chairman of the Sri Lanka Broadcasting Corporation. Livy Wijemanne died in Colombo on Sunday 24 November 2002 aged 85 years. He was a pioneering broadcaster from the island of Sri Lanka. He was instrumental in starting "FM 99".

== See also ==
- Radio Ceylon
- Sri Lanka Broadcasting Corporation
- Clifford Dodd
- List of Sri Lankan Broadcasters
