= Vernon Corea =

Sri Lankan-British radio broadcaster

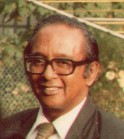
- Born: Hector Vernon Ivan Corea; 11 September 1927; Kurana, Sri Lanka
- Died: 23 September 2002 (aged 75); New Malden, Kingston upon Thames, England
- Presenting career
- Show: Ponds Hit Parade
- Station: Radio Ceylon
- Time slot: 7 p.m. Weekdays
- Show: London Sounds Eastern
- Station: BBC Radio London
- Time slot: 7:00 – 8:00 p.m. Sundays
- Style: Eastern Music Show Host
- Country: United Kingdom

Vernon Corea (11 September 1927 – 23 September 2002) was a pioneer radio broadcaster with 45 years of public service broadcasting both in Sri Lanka and the UK. He joined Radio Ceylon, South Asia's oldest radio station, in 1956 and later the Sri Lanka Broadcasting Corporation. During his time he presented some of the most popular radio shows in South Asia, including The Maliban Show, Dial-a-Disc, Holiday Choice, Two For the Money, Take It Or Leave It, Saturday Stars, To Each His Own, Kiddies Corner, and Old Folks at Home. He was well known not only in Sri Lanka, but right across the Indian Sub-Continent from the late 1950s to the 1970s – this was in the heyday of Radio Ceylon, the oldest radio station in South Asia.

== Early life ==
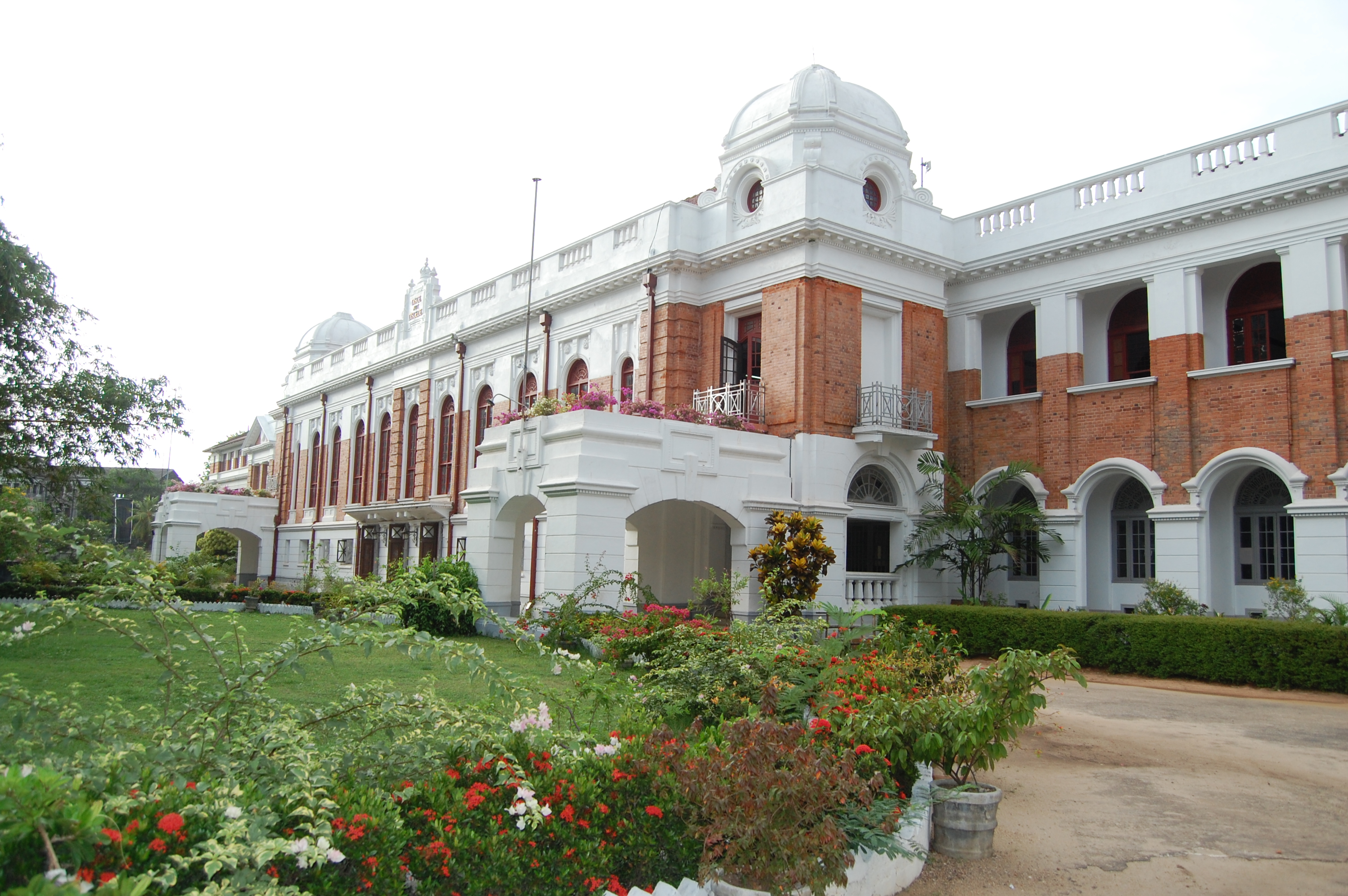
Vernon Corea attended the Royal College, Colombo. He represented his school in tennis, participated in drama productions and was a member of the Royal debating team.

Corea was born in Kurana, Katunayake, Ceylon (present-day Sri Lanka) on 11 September 1927. His parents were Reverend Canon Ivan Corea and Ouida Corea, and was the brother of Ernest Corea, a prominent journalist and former Ambassador to the United States. Rev. Corea was Vicar of St. Luke's Church, Borella, and St. Paul's Church, Milagiriya.

His family hailed from the west coast town of Chilaw in Sri Lanka and were direct descendants of General Dominicus Corea, also known as Edirille Rala who was tasked to take over Kotte in 1596 for King Vimala Dharmasurya I. His grandfather was Dr. James Alfred Ernest Corea, brother of the famed freedom fighters of Sri Lanka, Charles Edgar Corea and Victor Corea, founders of the Chilaw Association and the Ceylon National Congress. Recognising their role in the independence movement, Mahatma Gandhi, known as the 'Father of India,' visited Chilaw on his first and only visit to Ceylon in 1927 and met Vernon's grandfather in a Corea home called 'Sigiriya.'

Vernon Corea was educated at Royal College, Colombo a well known education institution, in Sri Lanka. He represented the school in tennis and was fully involved in the world of drama and the debating society. He was sent by his father to Bishop’s College, Calcutta, India for training into the priesthood. In Calcutta he was elected President of the Ceylon Students Association and acted in drama performances. He felt that the priesthood was not his vocation and returned to Ceylon, after the death of his mother.

== Career ==
Following brief careers in teaching at Uva College in Badulla (where he met his wife Monica) and as a salesman at Car Mart in Colombo, Vernon Corea joined Radio Ceylon as a Relief Announcer in 1956, he was appointed by the Director of the Commercial Service, the Australian, Clifford Dodd and his assistant Livy Wijemanne. He became well known as The Golden Voice of Radio Ceylon, representing shows of popular music, baila music, and western music. He was later Business Manager, News Director at the Sri Lanka Broadcasting Corporation.Corea represented the Director-General of the station at a Commonwealth Broadcasting Conference, when he was in the United Kingdom, on a six-month fellowship with the Nuffield Trust in 1970.

From 1956 to 1960, Vernon Corea and other announcers of Radio Ceylon introduced the music of Elvis Presley, Patsy Cline, Louis Armstrong, Jim Reeves, Hank Snow, and Cliff Richard over the airwaves of Radio Ceylon/Sri Lanka Broadcasting Corporation. They became hugely popular in South Asia.

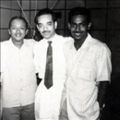
Pioneering broadcaster, Vernon Corea(left) at Radio Ceylon, Colombo in 1958.

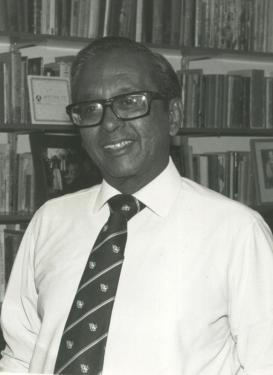
Vernon Corea, the BBC's Ethnic Minorities Adviser and broadcaster, at his home in Wimbledon Village, London in 1985.

Throughout his life and his broadcasting career Corea promoted the Sri Lankan talent in the world of popular music. He was the first to consistently promote Sri Lanka's musicians through his entertainment column – EMCEE published in the Ceylon Daily News in the 1960s–1970s. Vernon introduced hundreds of musicians to listeners at Radio Ceylon/Sri Lanka Broadcasting Corporation and in the studios of BBC Radio London when he presented the popular London Sounds Eastern radio programme. He 'discovered' many young Sri Lankan stars through his radio programmes on Radio Ceylon and promoted their musical talents in the EMCEE column in the Daily News in Colombo. Some went onto the international stage.

Some of Ceylon's first music stars such as Nimal Mendis, Bill Forbes, Des Kelly and Cliff Foenander, were interviewed by Vernon Corea, for Radio Ceylon. Their music was also introduced to a vast audience across the Indian sub-continent – millions tuned into the radio station and Radio Ceylon announcers enjoyed iconic status with South Asian listeners. The respected Hindu newspaper of India placed Vernon Corea in the Top 5 Broadcasters of the World stating that he introduced Sinhala Music onto the English Services of the Commercial Service of Radio Ceylon and the Sri Lanka Broadcasting Corporation. He was the first to introduce the talents of Clarence Wijewardena, Annesley Malewana, and others on English radio programmes, on Radio Ceylon.

As a special tribute to Vernon Corea's father, Reverend Canon Ivan Corea, the Sri Lankan superstar Clarence Wijewardena composed a moving song about a father's love, 'Ma Ethi Dedi Kala Piyaneni.' It was an international hit for Clarence Wijewardena and Annesley Malewana. In an interview, Annesley Malewanna recalls: "When we toured England in 1994 to hold musical shows, Vernon Corea who was in England requested me to sing this particular song. When I got on to the stage and started singing Vernon broke down and all of us were moved by this incident. Wherever we go, most people in foreign countries requested me to sing this song. Now I dedicate that song to my late father", he said.

== Television ==
Vernon Corea created television history on the island of Sri Lanka when he was invited to present the first ever experimental television broadcast on 15 June 1972 by the Radio Society of Ceylon. He appeared on television screens in Colombo, in black and white, on a short TV programme, this was history in the making. Seven years later the first regular television transmission was conducted in Sri Lanka and the first TV presenter on that regular transmission was Vernon Corea's cousin, Vijaya Corea – he introduced his cousin to radio by asking him to present 'Kiddies Corner' a popular children's programme on Radio Ceylon in the 1960s. Vijaya Corea was one of many young broadcasters mentored by Vernon Corea – he went on to become the Director-General of the Sri Lanka Broadcasting Corporation. Another protégé was Nihal Bhareti who went on to greater heights in broadcasting and was the Sri Lanka Broadcasting Corporation's Director of English Services. Leon Belleth was another mentee, after a successful career with Radio Ceylon/SLBC he retired in Australia.

There are now several television stations operating on the island, a far cry from the early experiments of the Radio Society of Ceylon (now Sri Lanka) in 1972.

== The BBC ==
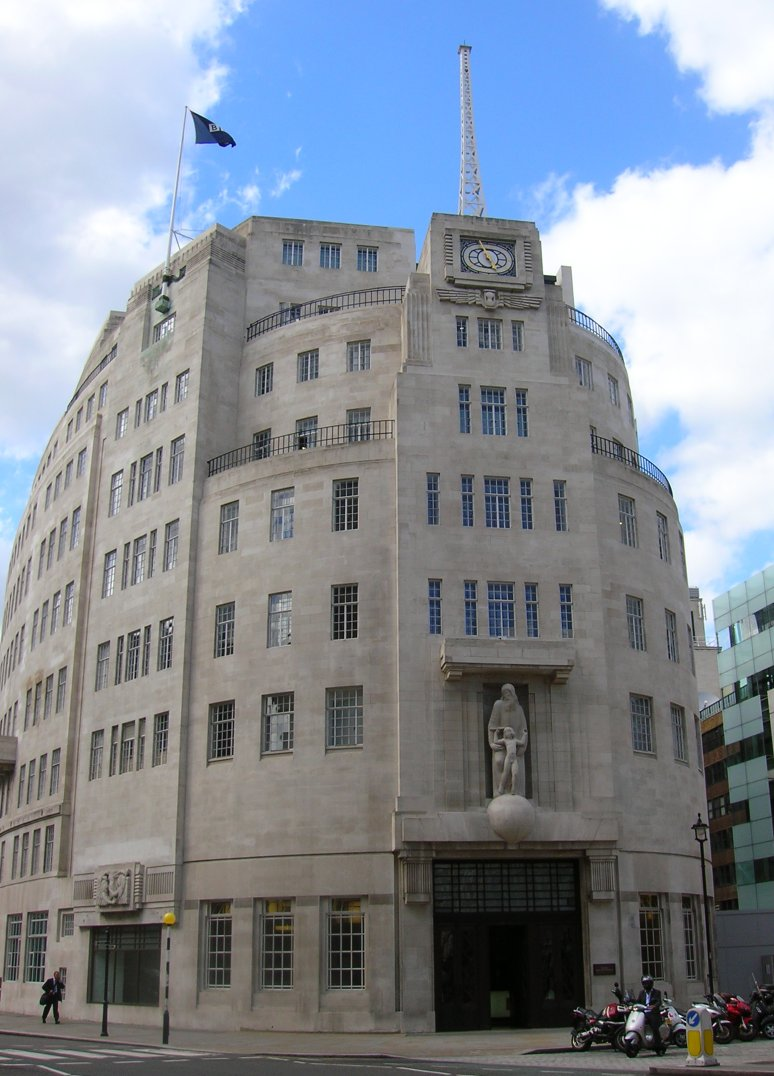
Vernon Corea created broadcasting history in the United Kingdom when he was appointed the first ever Ethnic Minorities Adviser to the BBC. He was the first Asian to be appointed to senior management at the BBC.

The Corea family migrated to England in 1975. Vernon Corea worked for Radio Worldwide based in Upper Norwood, then for BBC Radio London as a presenter for the popular London Sounds Eastern. He interviewed many Asian stars, including Pandit Ravi Shankar and Usha Uthup. The BBC radio programme drew a huge audience in the capital and was even featured in the Radio Times. Vernon Corea soon climbed the management ladder at the BBC – he was appointed Local Radio Asian Programmes Officer in 1978. He went on to become the Ethnic Minorities Adviser to the BBC; This was a senior management appointment – he held this post at the BBC until his retirement. Vernon Corea played a pivotal role in introducing and mentoring young, gifted and talented people into broadcasting. He trained minority ethnic broadcasters and found placements for them on the BBC Local Radio Network. His work contributed to the diversity of the BBC. Vernon Corea also lectured at the BBC Training Centre. Many of Corea's trainees are now presenters of mainstream radio programmes on BBC Radio. Among those who came to seek Vernon Corea's advice was the top BBC News Presenter, George Alagiah.

Corea was also invited to Nepal, Bangladesh and the Maldives to train broadcasters and was introduced to the President of the Maldives on a visit to Male, the capital.

== Church Work ==
Vernon Corea was a Christian, he was very involved in the work of the church in the UK – he was a Lay Reader of the Church of England at Emmanuel Church, Wimbledon in South-West London and previous to that appointment he was Lay Reader at Christ Church, Gipsy Hill in South-East London.

Recalling his life, Reginald Massey noted in The Guardian: Corea was a born broadcaster and racy raconteur, prone to making outrageous remarks with a straight face. But behind his frivolous manner was a generous and large-hearted Christian, who was also a lay reader at Emmanuel church in Wimbledon village, in south-west London. '

== Autism ==
The struggles of parents, carers, children and adults with autism was something Corea cared deeply about, after his own grandson was diagnosed with autism spectrum disorder. He raised awareness of the condition. In 2002 he attended a historic service for autism held at St Paul's Cathedral in London and wrote Prayers for Autism. These prayers are now being said on Autism Sunday commemorated annually, by churches and religious organisations across the world, on the second Sunday in February.

He died of diabetes, in New Malden in London on 23 September 2002.

== Quotes on Vernon Corea ==
'Vernon was a pioneering influence in the BBC and helped to lay the foundation for the work we are continuing to do to make sure our staff and our programmes are truly representative of our nation's diverse population.' (Greg Dyke – Director-General BBC)

'His sense of loyalty to his management and to his profession and his compassion and concern for those who worked under him were exemplary.' (Neville Jayaweera – former Director-General SLBC)

'The BBC at this time was striving to be more inclusive, and Corea found himself at the forefront of an increasing thrust for diversity. His importance both as a figurehead and a consultant was recognised by his appointment as the first ethnic minorities adviser in 1978.' (The Times)

== See also ==
- Radio Ceylon
- Sri Lanka Broadcasting Corporation
- List of Sri Lankan broadcasters

== Bibliography ==
- The Art of Radio By Stuart Wavell – Training Manual written by the Director Training of the CBC – Ceylon Broadcasting Corporation, 1969. (Photograph of Vernon Corea leading a brainstorming session in the Boardroom of the CBC)
- Satchmo Blows Up the World: Jazz Ambassadors Play the Cold War by Penny Von Eschen, Harvard University Press, 2006, ISBN 0-674-02260-2
