= Sri Lanka Broadcasting Corporation =

Public broadcaster in Sri Lanka

Sri Lanka Broadcasting Corporation (SLBC)
- Type: Radio network
- Country: Sri Lanka
- Availability: National & International
- Owner: Government of Sri Lanka
- Launch date: 1925; 100 years ago (Incorporated in 1967)
- Former names: Radio Ceylon; Radio SEAC; Ceylon Broadcasting Corporation
- Official website: www.slbc.lk

The Sri Lanka Broadcasting Corporation (SLBC) (Sinhala: ශ්‍රී ලංකා ගුවන් විදුලි සංස්ථාව, Shrī Lankā Guvan Viduli Sansthāva, Tamil: இலங்கை ஒலிபரப்புக் கூட்டுத்தாபனம், Ilangkai Oliparappuk Kūṭṭuttāpaṉam) came into existence on 5 January 1967 when Radio Ceylon became a public corporation. Dudley Senanayake who was the Prime Minister of Ceylon in 1967 ceremonially opened the newly established Ceylon Broadcasting Corporation along with Minister Ranasinghe Premadasa and the Director-General of the CBC, Neville Jayaweera. The first board of Directors of CBC consisted of Mr Neville Jayaweera (CCS), Mr A. L. M. Hashim, Mr Dharmasiri Kuruppu, Mr K.A.G. Perera and Mr Devar Surya Sena. After the first board meeting, it was decided unanimously to appoint the chairman, Mr Jayaweera, as the new Director-General.

== Radio Ceylon ==
The Sri Lanka Broadcasting Corporation (SLBC), formerly Radio Ceylon, is the oldest radio station in Asia, and was founded as Colombo Radio in 1925. Edward Harper who was then the Chief Engineer at the Telegraph Department in 1921, was the first person who initiated experimental broadcasts in Ceylon. The first-ever broadcast on an experimental basis took place in 1923. Gramophone music was played from the Ceylon Telegraph Office with the aid of a transmitter built by engineers of the Telegraph Department. The transmitter was built using radio equipment from a captured German submarine. Ceylon began a broadcasting service three years after the launching of broadcasting services in Europe.

Edward Harper who is known as the 'Father of Broadcasting in Ceylon' founded the Ceylon Wireless Club together with British and Sri Lankan radio enthusiasts. Sir Hugh Clifford, the British Governor, spoke to the nation on Colombo Radio for the first time on 16 December 1925. This was a historic occasion. The advent of broadcasting in Sri Lanka places the country alongside Great Britain, the United States of America and Germany, in terms of international broadcasting history.

== Radio SEAC ==
During World War II, the Allied Forces took over radio operations in Colombo and Radio Seac was born. Colombo based (British) announcers, David Jacobs and Desmond Carrington (who joined the BBC after the war) were among those who presented the news and radio programs for the Allied Forces across South-East Asia. When the war was over, Radio Seac was handed back to the Government of Ceylon. This was when the name was changed to Radio Ceylon. The name change heralded a new chapter in broadcasting in South Asia.

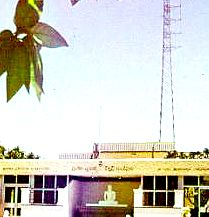
Sri Lanka Broadcasting Corporation

== Radio Ceylon ==
Radio Ceylon enjoyed the status 'King of the airwaves' of South Asia in the 1950s and 1960s. Millions of listeners tuned into the radio broadcasts. This was the golden era of Radio Ceylon. Clifford Dodd, an administrator from Australia was brought in under the Colombo Plan. It was Dodd who founded the Commercial Service of Radio Ceylon which was very successful.

Radio Ceylon and the Sri Lanka Broadcasting Corporation produced some of the finest announcers and presenters in the world. Among them are Livy Wijemanne, Vernon Corea, Pearl Ondaatje, Greg Roskowski, Tim Horshington, Claude Selveratnam, Jimmy Bharucha, Thevis Guruge, Chitrananda Abeysekera, A.W. Dharmapala, Karunaratne Abeysekera, H.M. Gunasekera, S.P. Mylvaganam, Gnanam Rathinam, Nihal Bhareti, Leon Belleth, K. Mylavaganam and Vijaya Corea Mark Anthony Fernando to name some.

== 80 Years of Broadcasting ==
In 2005 the Sri Lanka Broadcasting Corporation celebrated 80 years in the world of broadcasting. This was a historic landmark where broadcasting was concerned a very important chapter for communication in Sri Lanka.

== 40 Years as a Public Corporation ==
In 2007 the Sri Lanka Broadcasting Corporation celebrated 40 years as a public broadcasting corporation. With the incorporation in 1967 came the name change to Ceylon Broadcasting Corporation. When the country became a republic in 1972 the station came to be known as the Sri Lanka Broadcasting Corporation.

== Re-Launch of the English Commercial Service ==
The Chairman of the Sri Lanka Broadcasting Corporation, Hudson Samarasinghe, took the decision in 2008 to re-launch the English Commercial Service. Back in the 1950s and 1960s the Commercial Service of Radio Ceylon was a brand leader and helped the station to rule the airwaves in South Asia. The re-launch commenced on 1 September 2008. The SLBC had earlier allocated more time to BBC regular programmes. More entertainment programmes have been added to the re-vamped English Commercial Service with a view to grabbing a market share of listeners on the island and across the Indian sub-continent.

== See also ==
- List of Tamil-language radio stations
- Vernon Corea
- MJ Perera
- Ridgeway Thilakeratne
- List of Sri Lankan broadcasters
- List of Hindi broadcasters of Radio Ceylon
- Sri Lanka Rupavahini Corporation
