= Radio Ceylon =

Public radio station in Sri Lanka

Radio Ceylon (SLBC)
- Type: radio, and online
- Country: Sri Lanka
- Availability: National; International
- Owner: Government of Sri Lanka
- Launch date: 1925 (radio); 1967 (incorporation)
- Former names: Colombo Radio, Radio SEAC (1925–1948)
- Official website: www.slbc.lk

Radio Ceylon (Sinhala: ලංකා ගුවන් විදුලි සේවය Lanka Guwan Viduli Sevaya, Tamil: இலங்கை வானொலி, ilankai vanoli) is a radio station based in Sri Lanka (formerly Ceylon) and the first radio station in Asia. Broadcasting was started on an experimental basis by the colonial Telegraph Department in 1923, just four years after the inauguration of broadcasting in Europe (the first European broadcasting radio station started on 6 November 1919 in The Hague, The Netherlands; it was operated by the Dutch Hans Henricus Schotanus à Steringa Idzerda).

== History ==
The history of Radio Ceylon dates back to 1925, when its first precursor, Colombo Radio, was launched on 16 December 1925 using a mediumwave radio transmitter of one kilowatt of output power from Welikada, Colombo. Commenced just 3 years after the launch of BBC, Colombo radio was the first radio station in Asia and the second oldest radio station in the world.

This new medium of mass communication not only became increasingly popular in the years that followed, but also quickly evolved into a medium of national character, which led to the "Radio Service" being organised as a separate department of the government of Ceylon (currently Sri Lanka) in 1949. Subsequently, in 1967, the Department of Broadcasting was transformed into its present statutory form of a state corporation by the Ceylon broadcasting corporation Act. No 37 of 1966 of the parliament of Ceylon, thereby assuring increased autonomy and flexibility in the operations of the new organization.

The organisation acquired its present name, Sri Lanka Broadcasting Corporation, with the transition of the state into the status of Republic of Sri Lanka on 22 May 1972. SLBC (Stands for Sri Lanka Broadcasting Corporation) has since continued in the same legal status as a state corporation, and is currently listed under the scope of the ministry of Information and Media of the Government of Sri Lanka.

=== Transition from AM to FM ===
SLBC relied on mediumwave as its primary mode of domestic broadcasting until the 1990s. Some sporadic FM broadcasts were already introduced at several relay stations more as a means of expanding the broadcasts to medium wave repeater stations, however, by the late 1980s.

This was followed by the 'Island FM Development Project' that was launched in year 1995. The objectives of the project were to develop an Islandwide multi-channel FM stereo broadcast transmission network and to divest the costly domestic medium wave transmitting stations, which were typically broadcasting only one or two programme channels per transmitting station. By 1999, more than 95% of country's total population was being covered by SLBC's FM transmissions with nearly 90% of them receiving all six nationwide channels.

== Radio services ==
Currently, SLBC's domestic FM network broadcasts 6 radio stations on a nationwide basis, which are:

- Sinhala Swadeshiya Sevaya' (Sinhala National Service)
- Tamil National Service
- English Service
- City FM (Sinhala)
- Velenda Sevaya' (Sinhala Commercial Service)
- Thendral (Tamil Commercial Service)

== Other services ==
Radio Ceylon had a Hindi service that was launched in the early 1950s. Millions of rupees in terms of advertising revenue came from India through the efforts of Dan Molina, Frank Courtney, and S. Hariharan. The three operated Radio Advertising Services as the advertising agents of Radio Ceylon. The station employed some of the most popular Indian announcers who played a vital role in establishing Radio Ceylon as the 'King of the airwaves' in South Asia, among them, the Ganjwar sisters, Vimla and Kamini, Vijay Kishore Dubey, Gopal Sharma, Rakesh Sharma, Hasan Razvi, Kumar and Manohar Mahajan, Sunil Dutt (who went on to become a film star in Hindi Cinema), Ameen Sayani and elder brother Hamid Sayani, though not hired by Radio Ceylon became popular by using Radio Ceylon for broadcasting programs like "Binaca Geetmala" (first broadcast in 1952) and "Lipton Ke Sitaare."

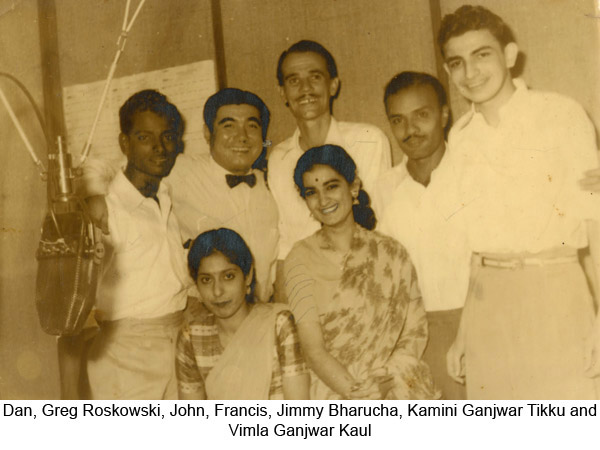
Group picture of Announcers of Radio Ceylon in the year 1953

Its most popular features were film songs. While the golden age of Hindi-language film music was in the 1950s and 1960s, the station popularised movie songs, including the ones from Asha Bhosle, Lata Mangeshkar, K.L. Saigal, Kishore Kumar, Mukesh, Mohammed Rafi, S. Janaki and others. The radio station took advantage of the situation as film music was banned by All India Radio and other Indian radio stations at the time. This led to increased listenership for radio programmes such as Binaca Geetmala. The Binaca Hit Parade was presented by Greg Roskowski, it was a countdown of English pop music beamed on the Commercial Service and the All Asia Service. Having heard the programme, the audience flooded the station with letters requesting a countdown of Hindi-language filmi songs and the idea of Binaca Geetmala was born.

Radio Ceylon also popularised English songs of Indian popular musicians - they went on to score hits, among them Uma Pocha (Bombay Meri Hai), Usha Uthup who sang Sri Lankan baila songs, and the Anglo-Indian star, Ernest Ignatius (who went on to be in Sir Andrew Lloyd Webber's 'Bombay Dreams' in London) had a hit, I married a female wrestler, on the Hindi service.

The station recorded jingles and beamed them on the All Asia Service - from Lux soap to Coca-Cola. Major brands queued up for their jingles to be broadcast live by the announcers of Radio Ceylon, such was the station's advertising power.

== Ceylon Broadcasting Corporation ==
Director General Neville Jayaweera in the boardroom of Radio Ceylon.

Radio Ceylon became a public corporation on 30 September 1967 and the station's name was changed to the Ceylon Broadcasting Corporation. Prime Minister Dudley Senanayake appointed a distinguished Ceylonese civil servant, Neville Jayaweera to head the CBC.

When Sri Lanka became a republic in 1972 the station underwent yet another name change as the Sri Lanka Broadcasting Corporation (SLBC).

In December 2005 Sri Lanka celebrated its 80th anniversary. On 5 January 2007, the Sri Lanka Broadcasting Corporation celebrated forty years as a public broadcasting corporation.

== See also ==
- Clifford Dodd
- Desmond Kelly
- Edward Harper
- Karunaratne Abeysekera
- Tissa Abeysekera
- Kiddies Corner
- List of Hindi broadcasters of Radio Ceylon
- List of Sri Lankan broadcasters
- M. J. Perera
- S.P.Mylvaganam
- Sri Lanka Broadcasting Corporation
- Vernon Corea
- Greg Roskowski

== Bibliography ==
- Wavell, Stewart. - The Art of Radio - Training Manual written by the Director Training of the CBC. - Ceylon Broadcasting Corporation, 1969.
- Ceylon, Radio. - Standards of Broadcasting Practice - Commercial Broadcasting Division. - Radio Ceylon, 1950.
- Buying and Believing: Sri Lankan Advertising and Consumers in a Transnational World by Steven Kemper, (Paperback - 7 Jan 2002)
- Satchmo Blows Up the World: Jazz Ambassadors Play the Cold War by Penny Von Eschen, Harvard University Press, 2006, ISBN 0674022602
- Encyclopedia of Business in Today's World, [Hardcover], Charles Wankel (Editor), Sage Publications, Inc (1 September 2009), ISBN 141296427X
- Handbook of the Media in Asia, [Hardcover], Professor Shelton A Gunaratne (Editor), Sage Publications Pvt. Ltd (8 June 2000), ISBN 0761994270
