= Charles Corea =

Charles Corea may refer to:

- Charles Edgar Corea (1866–1946), Sri Lankan politician and freedom fighter
- Charles Alfred Ernest Corea (1920–2010), Sri Lankan lawyer and proctor of the Supreme Court
- Charles Edward Bandaranaike Corea (?–1872), Sri Lankan lawyer

== See also ==
- Charles Correa (1930–2015), Indian architect and urban planner
- Charles Corrêa (born 1992), Brazilian slalom canoeist
