= Charles Alfred Ernest Corea =

Sri Lankan lawyer

Charles Alfred Ernest (Ernie) Corea
- Born: 1920; Chilaw, Sri Lanka
- Died: June 2010, Sri Lanka; Piliyandala
- Education: S. Thomas' College, Mount Lavinia,
- Occupation: Lawyer
- Title: Proctor
- Spouse: Patricia Corea
- Children: James Ernest Corea, Patricia Corea, Eugene Corea, Avril Corea,
- Parent(s): Dr. James Alfred Ernest Corea and Mildred Wickramaratne

Charles Alfred Ernest Corea was a Sri Lankan lawyer. He was a Proctor of the Supreme Court. His father was Dr. James Alfred Ernest Corea, the prominent physician of Chilaw who was the brother of Sri Lankan freedom fighters Charles Edgar Corea and Victor Corea.

== Education ==
The young Charles Alfred Ernest Corea was educated at the prestigious St Thomas' College, Mt. Lavinia. He also played a prominent role in the STC Old Boys Association throughout the 1960s and 1970s.

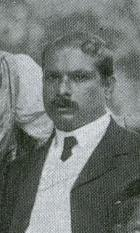
The highly respected physician from Chilaw, Dr. James Alfred Ernest Corea was the father of Ernie Corea.

Corea was educated at the prestigious S. Thomas' College, Mount Lavinia. and went on to become an Attorney-at-Law in the town of Piliyandala in Sri Lanka. His step-brother was Reverend Canon Ivan Corea who was Rural Dean of Colombo of the Church of Ceylon and Examining Chaplain to the Bishop of Colombo. Corea built up a reputation as a man of integrity and was a respected lawyer in Piliyandala.

== Descendant of King Dominicus Corea (Edirille Rala) ==
Charles Alfred Ernest Corea and his family are direct descendants of King Dominicus Corea who was also known as Edirille Rala. Dominincus Corea was crowned King of Kotte and Sitawaka by King Vimala Dharma Suriya of the Kandyan kingdom in 1596. Dominicus Corea rebelled against the Portuguese and fought many battles before he was captured and executed on 14 July 1596.

Sri Lankan author Kumari Jayawardena, writing about the Coreas observed: 'Unconnected to the liquor trade but making their money on plantation ventures was the Corea Family of Chilaw, an influential goyigama group with a history going back to Portuguese rule when they were warriors to Sinhala kings. During Dutch and British rule, members of the family were officials serving the state in various ways and rewarded with titles. Some members of the family took to the legal and medical professions, most notably the sons of Charles Edward Corea (a solicitor), who were active in local politics and in the Chilaw Association which campaigned against British land policies - especially the Waste Lands Ordinance, and for political reforms. The most active of Corea's sons was C.E.(Charles Edgar) who spoke up for peasant rights and was militant in his stand against the government. He was President of the Ceylon National Congress in 1924. C.E.Corea's brother, Alfred Ernest, was a doctor (Ernie Corea's father) and the youngest Victor Corea was a lawyer who achieved fame for leading a campaign (and going to jail) in 1922 to protest the Poll Tax on all males; he was the first President of the Ceylon Labour Union led by A.E.Goonesinha and was active in the Ceylon Labour Party. While being professionals and political activists, the Coreas were also important landowners. ' Ernie Corea owned extensive land in Piliyandala.

== Edirimanne Corea Family Union ==
He was a leading member of the Edirimanne Corea Family Union. The Corea family that hails from Chilaw and has produced freedom fighters, members of the Legislative Council, State Council, House of Representatives, the diplomatic corps, broadcasting and print media and professionals in many fields, are knit together by an active family union.

== Death ==
Ernie Corea died in Piliyandala in June 2010.

== See also ==
- Dominicus Corea
- James Alfred Ernest Corea
- Edirimanne Corea Family Union
- Supreme Court of Sri Lanka
- Piliyandala
- List of political families in Sri Lanka
