= James Alfred Ernest Corea =

Sri Lankan public official

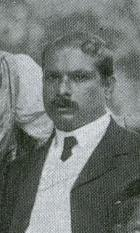
- Dr. James Alfred Ernest Corea of Chilaw
- Born: 1870; Chilaw, Sri Lanka
- Died: 1939 (aged 68–69); Chilaw, Sri Lanka
- Education: Royal College, Colombo, Ceylon Medical College
- Occupation: Medical Doctor
- Title: Physician
- Spouse(s): Letitia Grace Alice Seneviratne (deceased), Mildred Wickramaratne
- Children: 7 including Ivan Corea and Charles Alfred Ernest Corea
- Parent(s): Charles Edward Bandaranaike Corea and Henrietta Seneviratne

James Alfred Ernest Corea was a Sri Lankan public official. He was born in 1870. His father was Charles Edward Bandaranaike Corea who was a Proctor of the Supreme Court. His mother was Henrietta Seneviratne. J.A.E Corea's father died in 1872 when his youngest son Victor was just one. His wife Henrietta was a widow from the age of 21.

== Early life ==
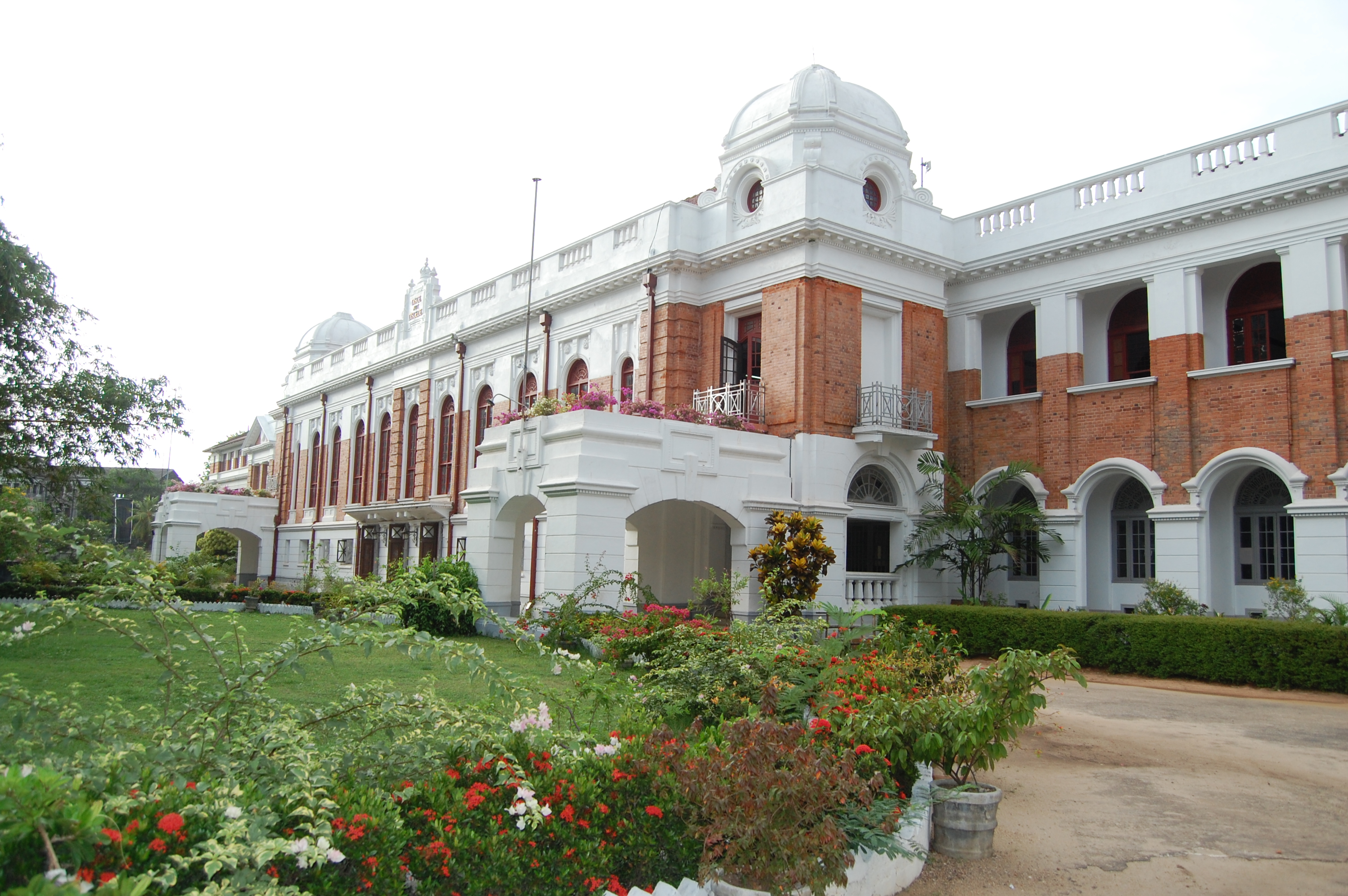
The young James Alfred Ernest Corea was educated at the prestigious Royal College, Colombo.

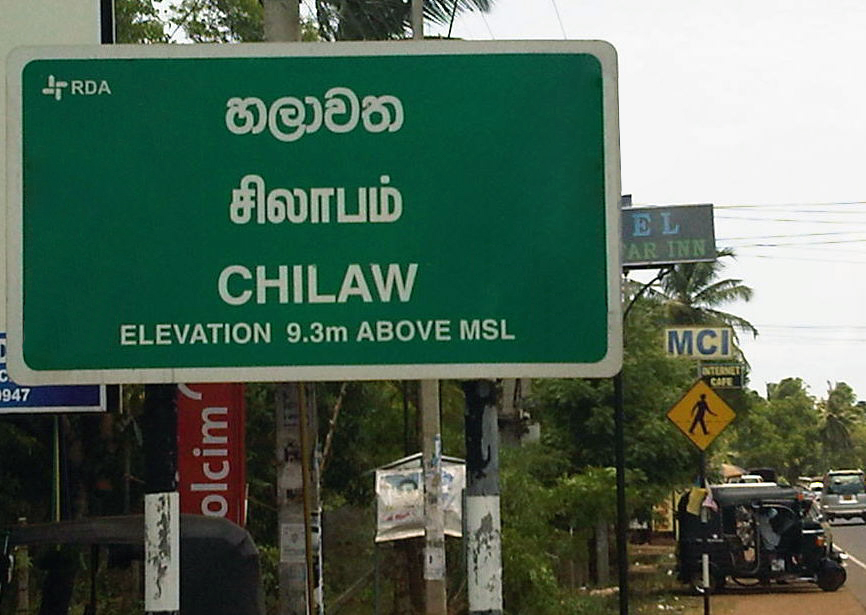
James Alfred Ernest Corea was a highly respected physician who worked in Chilaw, in Sri Lanka. Corea was a man of compassion - the Sunday Times of Sri Lanka wrote that he never charged fees from the poor for his medical services.

James Alfred Ernest Corea grew up in the west coast town of Chilaw, with his older brother and his three younger siblings, They lived with their mother, who was of the Seneviratne family of Sri Lanka.

== Education and medical practice ==
Corea was educated at Royal College, Colombo along with his older brother Charles Edgar Corea. After leaving Royal College, he participated in a five-year course at the Ceylon Medical College and qualified as a doctor. Following this, he entered government service and held his appointments at Elkaduwa and Kandy. Following his marriage to Letita Grace Alice Senevirante in 1897, he resigned, but continued his practice in Chilaw privately.

== Family ==
He was the brother of Charles Edgar Corea and Victor Corea, Agnes Corea and Evangeline Corea. Charles Edgar Corea and Victor Corea were freedom fighters in Sri Lanka during British rule. C.E. Corea was elected president of the Ceylon National Congress in 1924. Both brothers were also elected members of the Legislative Council of Ceylon.

The Sunday Times newspaper of Sri Lanka writing about the three brothers, noted: 'Of the three boys, the eldest, Charles Edgar Corea, was educated at Royal College and having excelled in studies and cricket, he passed out as a proctor of the Supreme Court, took to politics and in 1924 was elected president of the Ceylon National Congress. Warden Stone of S. Thomas' College described old Royalist C.E. Corea as one of the finest speakers of the English language. The second boy in the family was Dr. Alfred Ernest Corea who was educated at S. Thomas' College. He passed out as a doctor of medicine and chose to practise in Chilaw. He was a clever doctor and what was unique about him was that he charged no fees from the poor for his services. '

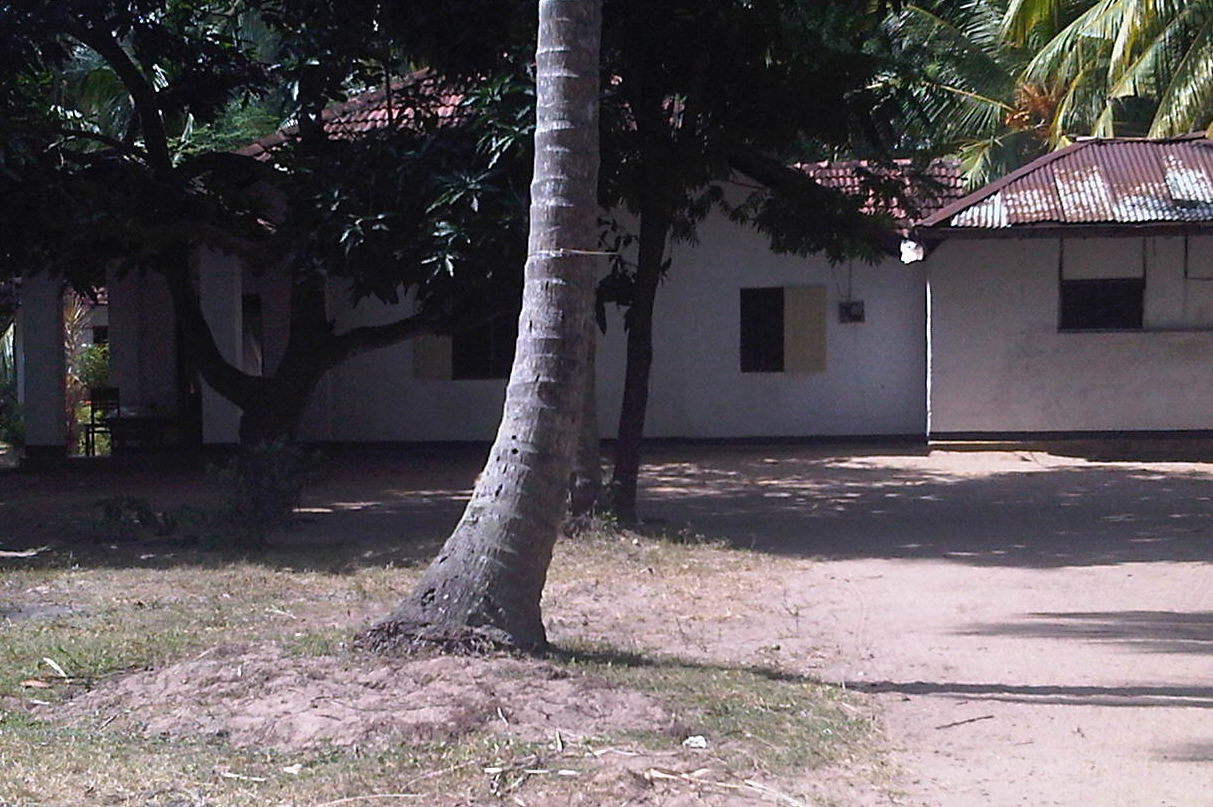
Members of Dr.James Alfred Ernest Corea's family stayed in Corea Court in Madampe, Sri Lanka - the estates were given to the Seneviratne Family by the King of Sri Lanka in 1758.

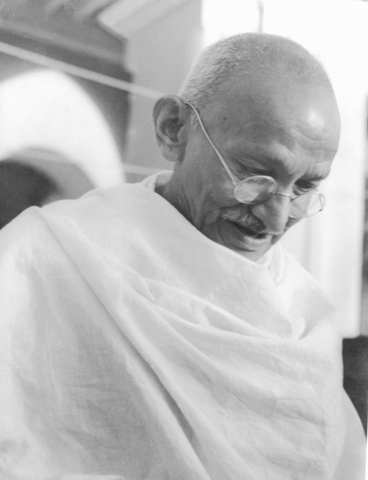
Dr.James Alfred Ernest Corea met Mahatma Gandhi in a Corea home called 'Sigiriya,' when he visited Chilaw in 1927 and stayed with the family.

The English author, Arnold Wright in 'Twentieth Century Impressions of Ceylon,' published in 1907 wrote: 'Charles Edward has left three sons, the eldest of whom, Charles Edgar, a Proctor, is the unofficial leader of the Chilaw Bar, a member of the Royal Asiatic Society, and Chairman of the Chilaw Association. In 1899, he was elected by the various native associations of Ceylon, and a public meeting in Colombo, to proceed to England as a delegate of the people of Ceylon, to lay before the Imperial Government a representation against the Waste Lands Ordinance. The second son, Alfred Ernest, is a physician, and the youngest, Charles Edward Victor, is an Advocate of the Supreme Court.'

Sri Lankan author Kumari Jayawardena, writing about the Coreas noted: 'Unconnected to the liquor trade but making their money on plantation ventures was the Corea Family of Chilaw, an influential goyigama group with a history going back to Portuguese rule when they were warriors to Sinhala kings. During Dutch and British rule, members of the family were officials serving the state in various ways and rewarded with titles. Some members of the family took to the legal and medical professions, most notably the sons of Charles Edward Corea (a solicitor), who were active in local politics and in the Chilaw Association which campaigned against British land policies - especially the Waste Lands Ordinance, and for political reforms.

The most active of Corea's sons was C.E.(Charles Edgar) who spoke up for peasant rights and was militant in his stand against the government. He was President of the Ceylon National Congress in 1924. C.E.Corea's brother, Alfred Ernest, was a doctor and the youngest Victor Corea was a lawyer who achieved fame for leading a campaign (and going to jail) in 1922 to protest the Poll Tax on all males; he was the first President of the Ceylon Labour Union led by A.E.Goonesinha and was active in the Ceylon Labour Party. While being professionals and political activists, the Coreas were also important landowners. '

Reverend Canon Ivan Corea, the second son of Dr. James Alfred Ernest Corea was appointed the Rural Dean of Colombo of the Church of Ceylon. He was also Chaplain to the Bishop of Colombo.

== Meeting Mahatma Gandhi in Chilaw ==
When the 'Father of India,' Mahatma Gandhi visited Chilaw in 1927, on his first ever visit to Ceylon, he met with Dr. J.A.E. Corea and the Corea Family. Gandhi stayed in a Corea home called 'Sigiriya' in Chilaw. Gandhi visited Chilaw on the invitation of his brothers, C.E.Corea and Victor Corea.

J.A.E.Corea was also an active member of the Chilaw Association, founded by his brothers. Throughout the early 20th century, they used the Chilaw Association as a vehicle to campaign for independence from British rule.

Dr. J.A.E.Corea died in Chilaw, Sri Lanka in 1939.

== See also ==
- Dominicus Corea
- Charles Edgar Corea
- Victor Corea
- Ivan Corea
- Vernon Corea
- Ernest Corea
- List of political families in Sri Lanka
- Edirimanne Corea Family Union
- Church of Ceylon
- Mahatma Gandhi's visit to Chilaw, Sri Lanka

== Bibliography ==
- The Mahavamsa - History of Sri Lanka, The Great Chronicle of Sri Lanka
- Ceylon and the Portuguese, 1505-1658 By P.E. Peiris (1920)
- The Conquest of Ceylon (Volumes 1–6) By Fr. Fernao de Queyroz, tr. Fr. S. G. Perera, Ceylon Government Press, (1930)
- Great Sinhalese Men and Women of History - Edirille Bandara (Domingos Corea) By John M. Senaveratna, (1937)
- A History of Sri Lanka By Professor K.M.De Silva (1981)
- The Fall of a Warrior - Edirille Bandara By Sarath Kumarawardane (2006)
- Twentieth Century Impressions of Ceylon: Its History, People, Commerce, Industries and Resources By A.W. Wright, Asian Educational Services, India; New Ed edition (15 December 2007)
