= Charles Edward Bandaranaike Corea =

Sri Lankan lawyer

- Born: Chilaw, Sri Lanka
- Died: 1872; Chilaw, Sri Lanka
- Occupation: Proctor of the Supreme Court
- Title: Proctor
- Spouse: Henrietta Seneviratne
- Children: Charles Edgar Corea, James Alfred Ernest Corea, Victor Corea, Agnes Corea, Evangeline Henrietta Corea
- Parent(s): Simon Corea and Cornelia Dias Bandaranaike

Charles Edward Bandaranaike Corea (? – 1872) was a Sri Lankan lawyer.

== Early life ==
Charles Edward Bandaranaike Corea was born in Sri Lanka to Cornelia Dias Bandaranaike and Simon Corea. Simon Corea was a son of David Christoffel Corea and was also a Justice of the Peace and succeeded his brother Johannes as Mudaliyar of Alutkuru Korale. He was the brother of Henry Richard, Mudaliyar of Alutkuru Korale, George Edmund, a Master of the Royal College, Jumeaux and Simon Corea.

== Later life ==
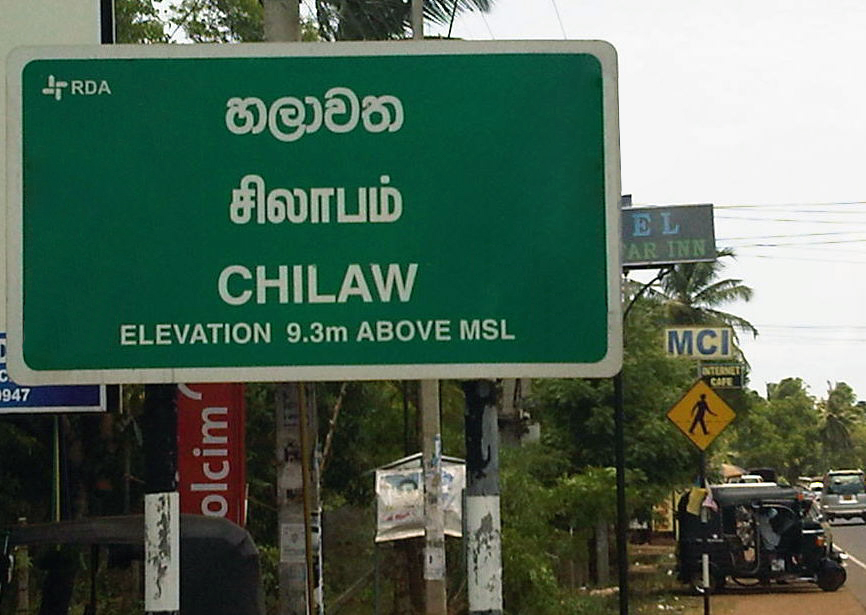
The author Kumari Jayawardena described Charles Edward Bandaranaike Corea as a 'leading lawyer' from Chilaw in Sri Lanka. His three sons went on to play leading roles in Chilaw as well as gaining reputations as fearless freedom fighters of Sri Lanka. They founded the Chilaw Association and used it as a vehicle to campaign for independence from British rule.

Charles Edward entered into the legal profession and became a Proctor of the Supreme Court. He married Henrietta Seneviratne and had five children, his three sons were Charles Edgar Corea, James Alfred Ernest Corea and Victor Corea and his two daughters were Agnes Eveline Rhoda and Evangeline Henrietta Corea. His eldest son Charles Edgar Corea and his youngest son Victor Corea followed in their father's footsteps and also entered the legal profession while James Alfred Ernest Corea became a doctor. Charles Edward's family lived in Ceylon and were known as one of the wealthiest families when he married into the Seneviratne family owning many acres of land. His three sons attended the famous Sri Lankan educational institution, Royal College, Colombo. They excelled in different studies, most notably the eldest son Charles Edgar Corea who was described as 'One of the finest speakers of the English language' by Warden Stone of S. Thomas' College. The well known Sri Lankan author, Kumari Jayawardena, described Charles Edward as 'a leading lawyer' and also describes him and his family as 'a highly respected family in Chilaw'.

Writing about the Coreas, Kumari Jayawardena observed: 'Unconnected to the liquor trade but making their money on plantation ventures was the Corea Family of Chilaw, an influential goyigama group with a history going back to Portuguese rule when they were warriors to Sinhala kings. During Dutch and British rule, members of the family were officials serving the state in various ways and rewarded with titles. Some members of the family took to the legal and medical professions, most notably the sons of Charles Edward Corea (a solicitor), who were active in local politics and in the Chilaw Association which campaigned against British land policies - especially the Waste Lands Ordinance, and for political reforms. The most active of Corea's sons was C. E. (Charles Edgar) who spoke up for peasant rights and was militant in his stand against the government. He was President of the Ceylon National Congress in 1924. C. E. Corea's brother, Alfred Ernest, was a doctor and the youngest Victor Corea was a lawyer who achieved fame for leading a campaign (and going to jail) in 1922 to protest the Poll Tax on all males; he was the first President of the Ceylon Labour Union led by A. E. Goonesinha and was active in the Ceylon Labour Party. While being professionals and political activists, the Coreas were also important landowners.

== Death ==
Charles Edward Bandaranaike Corea died in 1872 at an early age leaving his five young children in the care of his wife Henrietta, who was only 21 at the time of her husband's death. His eldest son was only six years old and his youngest son Victor was only a year old. The three sons became men of high standing in Chilaw taking into the legal profession and the medical profession. Charles Edgar Corea and Victor Corea entered politics and made their home-town Chilaw a place of fame when Mahatma Gandhi came to visit them in 1927. They were freedom fighters during the period when Sri Lanka was under British Rule and stood up where there was injustice. James Alfred Ernest Corea also brought fame upon the Corea's by becoming a respected Doctor and what was most remarkable about him was that he charged no fees for the poor. The two daughters of Charles Edward and his wife Henrietta, Agnes and Evangeline, married into wealthy families.

== Ancestry ==
Charles Edward was a direct descendant of King Dominicus Corea, who was also known as Edirille Rala. He was given two of the biggest kingdoms in Sri Lanka, Kotte and Sitawaka by Vimala Dharma Suriya, the King of Kandy. Domnicus Corea became a king in 1596 and a year later he was captured by the Portuguese forces and executed. He fought hard for and against the Portuguese who had invaded the island in 1505 and colonised Ceylon.

== See also ==
- Edirimanne Corea Family Union
- Ivan Corea
- Vernon Corea
- List of political families in Sri Lanka
- Mahatma Gandhi's visit to Chilaw, Sri Lanka

== Bibliography ==
- Twentieth Century Impressions of Ceylon: Its History, People, Commerce, Industries and Resources By A.W. Wright
- A national hero is honoured in his home town By P. De Silva
