= Ernest Corea =

Sri Lankan diplomat

Sri Lanka Ambassador to the United States
- In office April 1982 – September 1986
- President: J. R. Jayewardene
- Preceded by: P. M. D. Fernando
- Succeeded by: Susantha de Alwis

Personal details
- Born: 1932 Borella, Sri Lanka
- Died: 11 May 2017 (aged 84–85) Springfield, Virginia, U.S.
- Spouse: Indra Corea
- Children: 2
- Education: Royal College Colombo
- Occupation: Journalist; Diplomat

Ernest Corea (1932–11 May 2017) was a Sri Lankan journalist and diplomat. He is noted for his work to maintain a free and independent press and for negotiations involving Sri Lanka's development programs.

He was a journalist with the Lake House Group in Colombo, rising to the top as editor of the Ceylon Daily News and The Ceylon Observer. Corea was appointed Features Editor and a Foreign Affairs Columnist at the Singapore Straits Times in the 1970s.

== Early life ==
Corea was born in 1932 to Rev. Ivan Corea and Ouida Corea. His brother, Vernon, was a pioneering broadcaster with Radio Ceylon/SLBC and Ethnic Minorities Adviser to the BBC. His father was Rural Dean of Colombo in the Church of Ceylon, Vicar of St. Luke's Church Borella and St. Paul's Church, Milagiriya. His family hailed from the west coast town of Chilaw in Sri Lanka and were direct descendants of King Dominicus Corea, who was crowned King of Kotte and Sitawaka in 1596.

Corea was educated at Royal College, Colombo and the University of Peradeniya.

== Diplomat ==
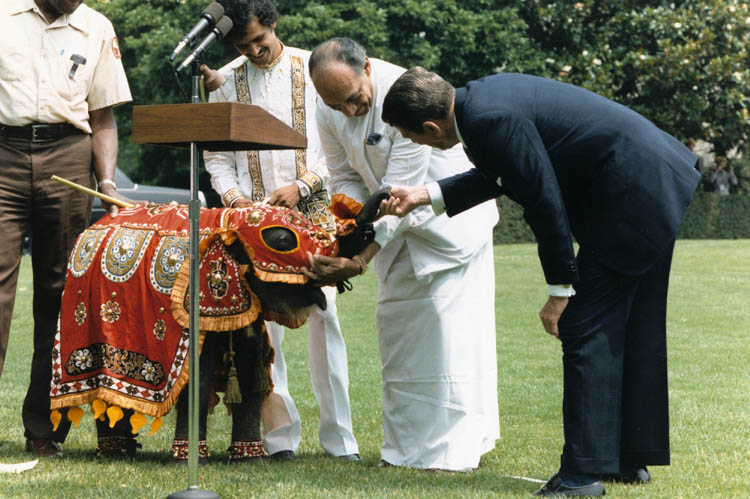
Ambassador Ernest Corea was present at the White House when Sri Lankan President Jayewardene gifted Jayathu to then American President Ronald Reagan and the American people, on a State Visit to the US in 1984.

In April 1982, he was appointed Sri Lanka's High Commissioner in Canada and concurrently served as Sri Lanka's Ambassador to Cuba. He was then appointed Sri Lanka's Ambassador to the United States, from where he was also Ambassador to Mexico.

Corea presented his credentials to U.S. President Ronald Reagan at the White House, in Washington, D.C. He arranged the first-ever state visit to the United States of a Sri Lankan Head of State when President Junius Richard Jayewardene was invited to the White House by President Reagan in 1984. When he left the diplomatic service, he joined the World Bank in Washington D.C. as a consultant. After retirement, he worked for IDN-InDepthNews and the Berlin-based Global Cooperation Council.

Corea died on 11 May 2017, aged 84 or 85, at his home in Springfield, Virginia, USA. He was married to Indra Ratnayake, a University of Peradeniya graduate and a Daily News journalist.

== See also ==
- Sri Lankan Non Career Diplomats
- James Alfred Ernest Corea
- List of political families in Sri Lanka
