= List of National Heroes of Sri Lanka =

List of National Heroes

This list shows recipients of the title "National Heroes of Sri Lanka"

== List of National Heroes ==
- Pandara Vanniyan - 1982

=== Great Rebellion of 1817–18 ===
Leaders (19) of the Great Rebellion of 1817–18 who were labelled by the British as traitors, made National Heroes on 8 December 2016.

1. Keppitipola, late Desave of Ouva
2. Godegedera, Late Adikarame of Ouva
3. Ketakala Mohattale of Ouva
4. Maha Betmerale of Kataragama in Ouva
5. Kuda Betmerale of Kataragama in Ouva
6. Palegolle Mohattale of Kataragama in Ouva
7. Wattekeyle Mohattale of Kataragama in Ouva
8. Polgahagedare Rehenerale of Kataragama in Ouva
9. Passerewatte Vidane of Kataragama in Ouva
10. Kiwulegedere Mohottale of Walapane
11. Kalugamuwe Mohottale of Walapane
12. Udamadure Mohottale of Walapane
13. Kohukumbure Rate Rala of Wellassa
14. Kohukumbure Walauwe Mohottale of Wellassa
15. Butawe Rate Rale of Wellassa
16. Baginigahawela Rate Rale of Wellassa
17. Maha Badullegammene Rate Rale of Wellassa
18. Bulupitiye Mohottale of Wellassa
19. Palle Malheyae Gametirale of Wellassa

Participants (49) of the Great Rebellion of 1817–18 who were sentenced to death by the Martial Court, made National Heroes on 11 September 2017.

1. Appurala Arachchila, Uva
2. Appuhamy Arachchila, Uva
3. Arampola (Loku) Mohottala, Sath Koralaya
4. Aluthnuwara Appuwa, Sabaragamuwa
5. Aluthnuwara Naideral], Sabaragamuwa
6. Aluvihare Nilame, Matale
7. Ellepola Maha Nilame, Matale
8. Idamegama Ganethirala, Uva Medakinda
9. Iriyagama Kalubanda, Yatinuwara
10. Udapalathe Vidane
11. Kalugalpitiye Vidane
12. Kepettipola Maha Nilame, Matale
13. Kindi Menika Duraya, Sabaragamuwa
14. Kirinaida (First)
15. Kirinaida (Second)
16. Kiriminda
17. Kivulegedara Mohottala, Viyaluwa
18. Kuda Badulugammana Raterala, Wellassa
19. Kumbakele Shilpa
20. Kethukurala, Sath Koralaya
21. Kotabowe Magalarawe Mohottala, Wellassa
22. Ganitha Uva
23. Thennewatte Disawa, Dumbara
24. Diyakele Pihanarala
25. Deegolle Raterala, Uva
26. Dewdiya Raterala, Uva Yatikinda
27. Dewagolle Hondahami, Sabaragamuwa
28. Nindagame Dinga
29. Tikirala Alias Kandukara Arachchi
30. Tikiri Rala
31. Pelawa Mahaduraya
32. Puncha/Pinchi
33. Polgahagedara Pihanarala, Uva
34. Butawe Raterala, Wellassa
35. Boragolle Mohottala, Walapane
36. Bodimaluwe Vidane, Sabaragamuwa
37. Madugalle Udagabada Nilame, Dumbara
38. Madulle Aruma]], Walapane
39. Madulle Ganethirala, Walapane
40. Madulle Punchirala, Walpane
41. Mawathagama Nilame, Sath Koralaya
42. Medagasthalawe Basnayaka Rala
43. Wadawela Mohottala, Uva
44. Welarawe Raterala, Uva
45. Sedara, Sabaragamuwa
46. Hakmana Thennewatte Nilame, Dumbara
47. Hannasgedara Mohottala, Matale
48. Haloluwe Kuda Sattambi, Harispattuwa
49. Higgahalande Vidane, Uva

Participants (32) of the Great Rebellion of 1817–18 who were declared as "betrayers" and expelled to Mauritius by the Martial Court, made National Heroes on 11 September 2017.

1. Ambagaspitiye Lekam, Dumbara
2. Amunugama Hitapu Kunam Maduwe Lekam, Dumbara
3. Ihagama Unnanse, Harispattuwa
4. Iriyagama Nilame, Yatinuwara
5. Iriyagama Rate Mahathmaya, Yatinuwara
6. Ketakele Mohottala, Uva
7. Ketakumbure Hitapu Rate Mahathmaya, Udunuwara
8. Kurukohogama Kiribanda, Dumbara
9. Kempitiye Korala, Sathara Koralaya
10. Kohukumbure Raterala, Wellassa
11. Galagoda Kotte Disa Mahathmaya, Hewaheta
12. Godegedara Adikaram, Wellassa
13. Thalagune Wannaku Nilame, Dumbara
14. Dangamuwe Mohottala, Uva Yatikinda
15. Dedunupitiya Mohottala, Thumpane Palle Palatha
16. Demodara Mohottala, Sabaragamuwa
17. Dodamwala Banda
18. Pitawala Lekam Mahathmaya, Dumbara
19. Pilimathalawe Nilame, Yatinuwara
20. Maththemagoda Thamankaduwa Disawa, Thumpane
21. Mathethemagoda Thun Korale Disawa, Thumpane
22. Meegahapitiye Raterala, Wellassa
23. Meewathure Hitapu Lekam, Yatinuwara
24. Rahupola Pihanarala, Uva Udukinda
25. Wattekele Mohottala, Uva Soranathota
26. Walpalagolle Muhandiram, Thumpane Ganata Palatha
27. Wettewe Hitapu Rate Mahathmaya, Thumpane Uda Palatha
28. Hapathgamuwa (Loku) Mohottala, Viyaluwa
29. Hapathgamuwe (Kuda) Mohottala, Viyaluwa
30. Kanawerelle Raterala, Uva
31. Karane Raterala
32. Kurugahagama Kiribanda

=== Matale rebellion ===
- Puran Appu
- Gongalegoda Banda
- Kudahapola thero

=== Sri Lankan independence movement ===
Incomplete

- Anagarika Dharmapala
- C. W. W. Kannangara
- D. R. Wijewardena
- Don Stephen Senanayake
- E. W. Perera
- Fredrick Richard Senanayake
- Henry Pedris
- James Peiris
- Ponnambalam Arunachalam
- Ponnambalam Ramanathan
- Tuan Burhanudeen Jayah
- A. Ekanayake Gunasinha
- Arthur V. Dias
- Charles Edgar Corea
- Don Baron Jayatilaka
- George E. de Silva
- Gratien Fernando
- Henry Woodward Amarasuriya
- Herbert Sri Nissanka
- Leslie Goonewardene
- M. C. Siddi Lebbe
- Madduma Bandara Ehelapola
- N. M. Perera
- Philip Gunawardena
- S. Mahinda
- Susantha de Fonseka
- Thomas Amarasuriya
- Victor Corea
- Vivienne Goonewardena
- W. A. de Silva
- Walisinghe Harischandra
- Wilmot A. Perera

== Bibliography ==
- Bandara, Kelum (6 March 2019). "Ban lifted on 'Angampora': Wellessa heroes honoured". www.dailymirror.lk. Daily Mirror.
- Kanakarathna, Thilanka (11 September 2017). "81 leaders in 1818 freedom struggle declared as national heroes". www.dailymirror.lk. Daily Mirror.
- Somasundaram, Daya (2010). "Collective trauma in the Vanni- a qualitative inquiry into the mental health of the internally displaced due to the civil war in Sri Lanka". International Journal of Mental Health Systems. 4. University of Jaffna: 4. doi:10.1186/1752-4458-4-22. PMC 2923106. PMID 20667090. S2CID 40442344.
- "Proclamation By His Excellency The President" (PDF). The Gazette of the Democratic Socialist Republic of Sri Lanka. 1998/25 (Extraordinary). Sri Lanka: Department of Government Printing. 21 December 2016.
- "Proclamation By His Excellency The President" (PDF). The Gazette of the Democratic Socialist Republic of Sri Lanka. 2036/11 (Extraordinary). Sri Lanka: Department of Government Printing. 11 September 2017.
- "Sri Lanka's Independence movement". www.sundaytimes.lk. Sunday Times. 30 January 2011.
