= Manakkulama =

Manakkulama is a village situated in the North-Western province of Sri Lanka, 80 km from Colombo city and 6 km from Chilaw town. Manakkulama was known as "weli wewa - (sandy lake)" before the arrival of the Portuguese in the 16th century. The major lake "Karavita" is found in this village. Manakkulama lies in Puttalam District. Manakkulama village is a tourist attraction.
