= Dominicus Corea =

King Dominicus Corea (Edirille Rala)
- Pretender
- Born: 1565; Colombo
- Died: July 14, 1596; Colombo
- Title(s): King of Kotte and Sitawaka
- Father: Don Jeronimo Corea (Mudaliyar Vikramasinha)(Commander-in-Chief of King Mayadunne's army)
- Mother: Anna Devi
- Spouse: Princess Subadra Devi, daughter of King Veediya Bandara, ruler of the Principality of the Seven Korales

Dominicus Corea (Sinhalese family name Edirille Bandara) also known as Domingos Corea and Edirille Rala, was the son of Don Jeronimo Corea and Anna Corea. Don Jeronimo Corea was also known as Mudaliyar Vikramasinha, Commander-in-Chief of King Mayadunne's army. Jeronimo Corea was executed by King Mayadunne's son, Rajasinghe. Dominicus Corea was born in Colombo in 1565. At that time, the Portuguese had colonised Ceylon, and his parents converted to Catholicism.

Following the death of Don Jeronimo Corea, his two sons, Dominicus and Simon were sent to Colombo for safety – at the time King Dharmapala was reigning in the Kingdom of Kotte. Dominicus and Simon were baptised as Catholics and grew up with the young Prince Konappu Bandara – later on he reigned as King Vimala Dharma Suriya of the Kandyan kingdom.

De Queyroz, the great Portuguese historian writing about Dominicus Corea noted that "he was able to read and write like a well bred man." Trained from boyhood warlike pursuits, he was skilled in arms, and was dreaded as being one of the most expert swordsmen in his time.

== King of Kotte and Sitawaka ==
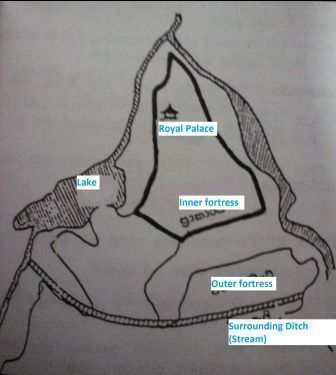
Sketch map of Kotte

Dominicus Corea was crowned King of Kotte in 1596. He was given the kingdoms of Kotte and Sitawaka by King Vimala Dharma of Kandy around 1596. John M. Senaveratna, in his book 'Great Sinhalese Men and Women of History' (Volume 3) wrote: 'He (King Vimala Dharma) according him (Dominicus Corea) the precedence of a King, and, in order to cement the friendship between the two, gave him a Royal Princess – Subadra Devi.' (She was the daughter of sub-King Veediya Bandara, ruler of the Principality of the Seven Korales.)

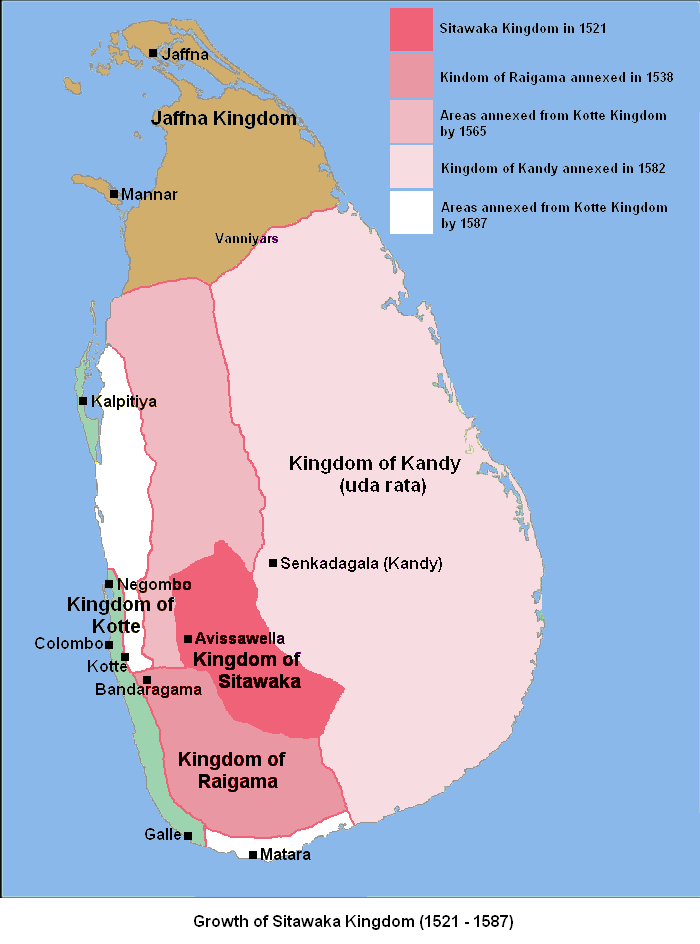
King Vimala Dharma Suriya of Kandy crowned Edirille Rala or Dominicus Corea, King of Kotte and Sitawaka, in 1596.

Vimala Dharma made a proclamation throughout his capital, that on the following day would be celebrated the marriage and coronation of 'Edirimanne Suriya Bandara' – which was the name (It was his wife's family name) adopted by Corea for his investiture with Royal rank – and ordering that all the grandees of the kingdom should be present in gala dress. Edirimanne Suriya Bandara, the new-made King, wearing a crown of gold on his head, was then accommodated on the seat of the back of the middle elephant; while two influential chiefs – the oldest Mudaliyars of the (Kandyan) Court – rode each on an elephant by the side.'

The 'Mahavamsa', the recorded chronicles of Sri Lankan history (starting from the 3rd century BCE), refers to Edirille Rala as a 'war hero.' The Mahavamsa recalls the meeting of Edirille Rala and Commander Veediya Bandara who led the armies of the Kandyan kingdom. Edirille Rala married his daughter when he was crowned King of Kotte and Sitawaka. According to the Mahavamsa, 'He (Veediya Bandara), went and stopped at the Seven Korale. By this time, the ruler there was a war hero. He was Edirimanne Suriya, better known as Edirille Rala. He had made Mudukondapala, a place close to Kurunegala, his capital city. When he saw Commander Veediya Bandara, he was delighted and welcomed him with all love and respect. He was well treated. Then both of them broke into conversation. Edirille Rala, just like Veediya Bandara, was an erstwhile enemy of the Portuguese. As such, this meeting of theirs was extra special. Both of them were enemies of the King of Sitawaka as well. This common feature was something to be happy about.'

'Sabaragamuwe Vamsa Kathawa,' ('Sabaragamuwa – in Legend and History'), a book published by the Sabaragamuwa Provincial Council, mentions Edirille Rala: 'Some of the very heroic and colourful figures in our history are sons of Sabaragamuwa – Parakramabahu I, born in Dedigama, the warrior King Rajasinghe I also known as Sitawaka Rajasingha, Edirille Rala born in Colombo and baptised Domingo Corea, who returned to the village of his ancestors Atulugama near Sitawaka and turned against the Portuguese.'. In his lifetime he fought for all the contending forces of the period, often changing his allegiance.

== Death ==
Corea rebelled against the Portuguese, and inflicted massive defeats between 1594 and 1596. Professor K. M. de Silva in his book 'A History of Sri Lanka,' writes about Edirille Rala's revolt against the Portuguese: 'From the beginning however, there was resistance to Portuguese mastery over Kotte. While Dharmapala was alive there were two major revolts, one led by Akaragama Appuhamy in 1594, and the other by Edirille rala in 1594–96.' King Dominicus Corea was captured by the Portuguese and executed on July 14, 1596, at the age of 31 in Colombo.

The Portuguese were in Ceylon (Portuguese: Ceilão) from 1505 to 1658.The Portuguese fought many battles between 1594 and 1596 with Dominicus Corea's army, ultimately capturing him and executing him in Colombo in 1596.

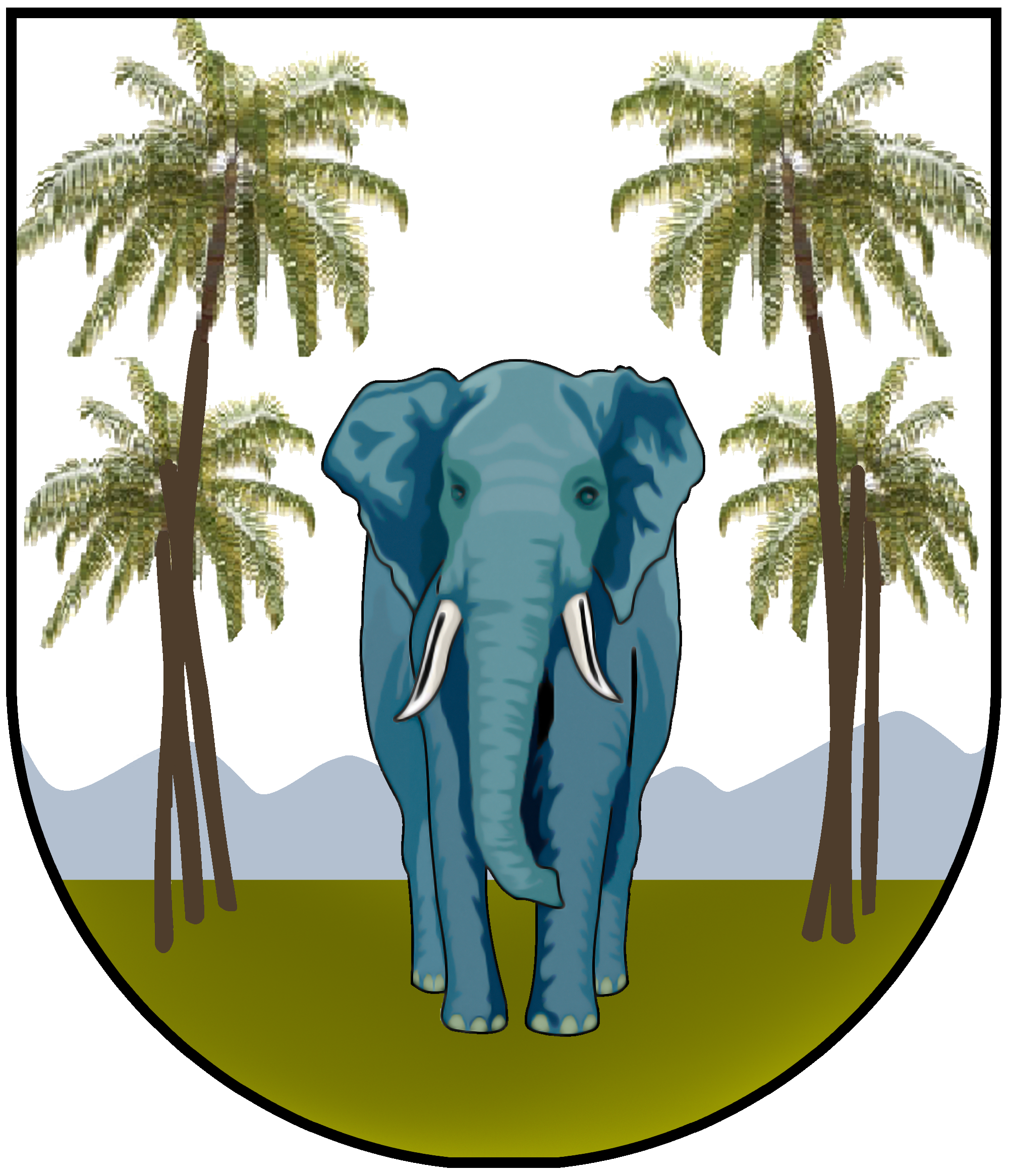
The Portuguese Coat of Arms in Ceylon – ironically it was Corea who led his army against the Portuguese, riding into battle, on an elephant.

"Such was the sad end of Domingos Corea, Edirimana Suriya Bandara, the greatest Sinhalese of his day," said Sri Lankan historian John M. Seneviratna. 'Great Warriors like Mayadunne, Veediya Bandara, Seethawaka Rajasinghe, Vimaladharmasuriya I, Senarath, Rajasinghe II, Nikapitiye Bandara and Edirille Rala who fought the Portuguese to preserve our territorial integrity and kept the Portuguese at bay despite all odds,' wrote Janaka Perera in the Asian Tribune.

== The descendants of King Dominicus Corea ==
The Sri Lankan author Kumari Jayawardena, writing about the Coreas observed: 'Unconnected to the liquor trade but making their money on plantation ventures was the Corea Family of Chilaw, an influential goyigama group with a history going back to Portuguese rule when they were warriors to Sinhala kings. During Dutch and British rule, members of the family were officials serving the state in various ways and rewarded with titles. Some members of the family took to the legal and medical professions, most notably the sons of Charles Edward Corea (a solicitor), who were active in local politics and in the Chilaw Association which campaigned against British land policies – especially the Waste Lands Ordinance, and for political reforms. The most active of Corea's sons was C.E.(Charles Edgar) who spoke up for peasant rights and was militant in his stand against the government. He was President of the Ceylon National Congress in 1924. C.E.Corea's brother, Alfred Ernest, was a doctor and the youngest Victor Corea was a lawyer who achieved fame for leading a campaign (and going to jail) in 1922 to protest the Poll Tax on all males; he was the first President of the Ceylon Labour Union led by A.E.Goonesinha and was active in the Ceylon Labour Party. While being professionals and political activists, the Coreas were also important landowners. '

The descendants of Edirille Rala, King Dominicus Corea, still play leading roles in various professional fields in Sri Lanka and around the world. Among the notable contributions to society are ones made by Charles Edgar Corea and his brother Victor Corea who were founder members of the Ceylon National Congress and the Legislative Council of Ceylon. C.E.Corea was elected President of the Ceylon National Congress in 1924. Both were distinguished freedom fighters and were prominent in the independence movement of Ceylon. James Alfred Ernest Corea, brother of C.E.Corea and Victor Corea, was born in 1870 – he joined the medical service in Ceylon. He was a clever doctor and what was unique about him was that he charged no fees from the poor for his services. Gate Mudaliyar James Edward Corea was in charge of the rural police in Pitigal Korale. Sir Claude Corea was Ceylon's High Commissioner in the United Kingdom and was appointed Ambassador to the United States in 1948. He was elected President of the United Nations Security Council in May 1960 and was featured in Life Magazine. His son Harindra Corea was appointed Deputy Foreign Minister of the Government of Sri Lanka in the 1990s and was also the member of parliament for Chilaw. Srikuradas Charles Shirley Corea was a distinguished parliamentarian, MP for Chilaw and Speaker of the House of Representatives of Ceylon from 1967 to 1970.

J.C.A. Corea was the first Sri Lankan Principal of Royal College, Colombo. Reverend Canon Ivan Corea was Rural Dean of Colombo and Chaplain to the Bishop of Colombo in the Church of Ceylon. His sons went on to play significant roles in the media and in the Diplomatic Corps – Vernon Corea was a pioneer broadcaster with Radio Ceylon (SLBC) – he was appointed the Ethnic Minorities Advisor to the BBC in the late 1970s. Ernest Corea, onetime Editor of the Daily News was appointed Sri Lanka's High Commissioner to Canada and Ambassador to the United States in the 1980s.

Dr. C.V.S.Corea was President of the Homeopathic Association of Ceylon. This association was inaugurated in 1951 by Dr C.V.S Corea whose efforts paved the way for the Homeopathy Act 1970 and the appointment of The Homeopathic Medical Council in Sri Lanka. He was also a founder member of Ceylon Theatres in 1928. His son was the Sri Lankan Economist, Dr. Gamani Corea who was appointed Secretary-General of the United Nations Conference on Trade and Development (UNCTAD) and Assistant Secretary-General of the United Nations. Another son, Dr.Vijaya Corea was Director-General of the Sri Lanka Broadcasting Corporation in Colombo.

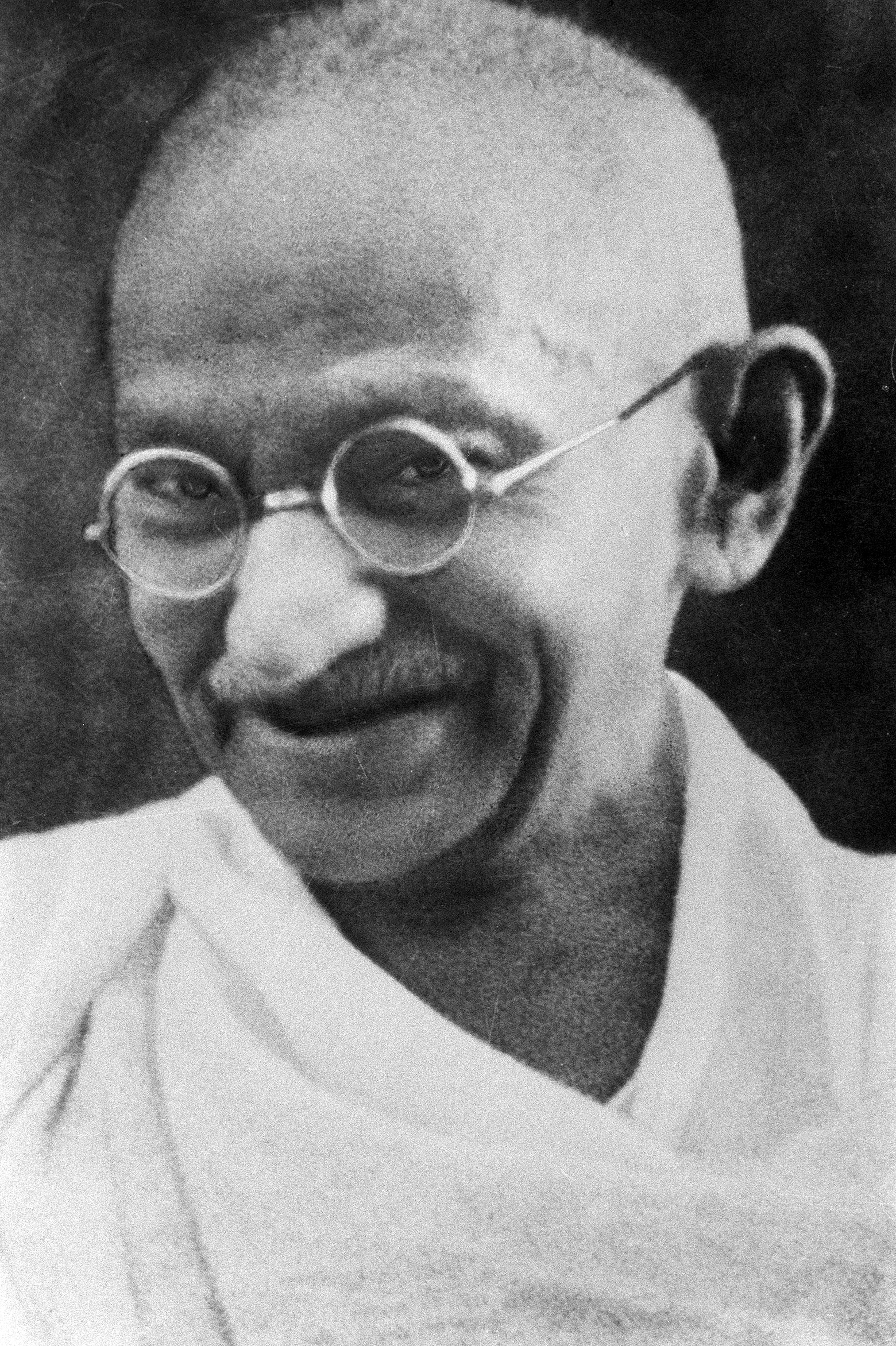
Mahatma Gandhi, the 'Father of India, visited Chilaw in Ceylon and stayed in a Corea Family home, he gifted a spinning wheel and a colour poster on the 'Fighters of Swaraj,' to the Coreas in 1927.

Norman Corea, brother of C.V.S.Corea was a celebrated Sri Lankan musician and composer. His music was played at the first ever Serendipity Festival in London, UK in 2003. It was a presentation of Sri Lankan painting, installation, sculpture, mixed media work, poetry, dance and music in association with the October Gallery of Bloomsbury, London. It was the first major exhibition of Sri Lankan art outside the shores of Sri Lanka, since the 43 group exhibited in London.

Charles Alfred Ernest Corea (Ernie) was a leading lawyer in Sri Lanka. His son, Dr. Eugene Corea now heads the Edirimanne Corea Family Union in Colombo. Sri Sangabo Corea is a pioneering advertising guru, he 'discovered' Sri Lanka's 'King of Pop', Clarence Wijewardena and Sri Lankan star, Annesley Malewana. Henri Corea was a Senior Superintendent of Police in Sri Lanka, his son Professor James Randunna Corea worked at the King Fahd Teaching Hospital in Dammam, where he trained orthopaedic surgeons. Another son, Deva Corea, was also a Senior Superintendent of the Sri Lanka Police. The younger generation of the Corea Family are also playing their part in society across the world.

== Mohandas Gandhi visits the Corea Family in Chilaw ==
Mohandas K. Gandhi (The 'Father of India') visited Ceylon in 1927 and stayed with the Corea Family in Chilaw. Mohandas Gandhi stayed in a Corea home called 'Sigiriya,' on his only visit to Ceylon. According to an article in the 'Sunday Observer' in Sri Lanka: 'When Mahatma Gandhi came to Ceylon he visited Chilaw to attend a banquet that was hosted by the Coreas at "Sigiriya" the house that belonged to Victor Corea's sister and husband. Here, Mahatma Gandhi presented a colour poster under the headline Fighters for Swaraj that featured all the national heroes of India each in oval shaped bust size photographs to Victor Corea as his photograph too was included in the poster amongst the political giants of India. This alone was a glowing tribute to the campaign for freedom, initiated by Victor Corea that was somewhat similar to the campaign conducted in India. '

== See also ==
- Edirille Bandara
- Charles Edgar Corea
- Gamani Corea
- Claude Corea
- Ivan Corea
- Vernon Corea
- Ernest Corea
- Vijaya Corea
- J.C.A. Corea
- List of political families in Sri Lanka
- Edirimanne Corea Family Union
- Mahavamsa
- Kingdom of Kotte
- Kingdom of Sitawaka
- Mahatma Gandhi's visit to Chilaw, Sri Lanka
- Sabaragamuwa
- Mahatma Gandhi
- Portuguese period in Ceylon

== Bibliography ==
- The Mahavamsa – History of Sri Lanka, The Great Chronicle of Sri Lanka
- Ceylon and the Portuguese, 1505–1658 By P.E. Peiris (1920)
- The Conquest of Ceylon (Volumes 1–6) By Fr. Fernao de Queyroz, tr. Fr. S. G. Perera, Ceylon Government Press, (1930)
- Great Sinhalese Men and Women of History – Edirille Bandara (Domingos Corea) By John M. Senaveratna, (1937)
- A History of Sri Lanka By Professor K.M.De Silva (1981)
- Sabaragamuwa Vansa Kathawa – Sabaragamuwa – in Legend and History By Sabaragamuwa Provincial Council, (2004)
- The Fall of a Warrior – Edirille Bandara By Sarath Kumarawardane (2006)
- Twentieth Century Impressions of Ceylon: Its History, People, Commerce, Industries and Resources By A.W. Wright, Asian Educational Services, India; New Ed edition (Dec 15, 2007)
