= 1927 visit by Mahatma Gandhi to Ceylon =

Mahatma Gandhi the 'Father of the Nation of India', paid a historic visit to Ceylon in 1927. On his first and only visit to the island, he was invited to Chilaw by the famed freedom fighters of Sri Lanka, Charles Edgar Corea and his brother Victor Corea. In addition to Chilaw, Mahatma Gandhi had visited Colombo, Kandy, Galle, Jaffna, Nuwara Eliya, Matale, Badulla, Bandarawela, Hatton and Point Pedro during his three-week-long visit to Sri Lanka and made many speeches to Sri Lankan audiences. During his stay in Ceylon he also visited the schools established by the Buddhist Theosophical Society in Ceylon namely Ananda College in Colombo, Mahinda College in Galle and Dharmaraja College in Kandy.

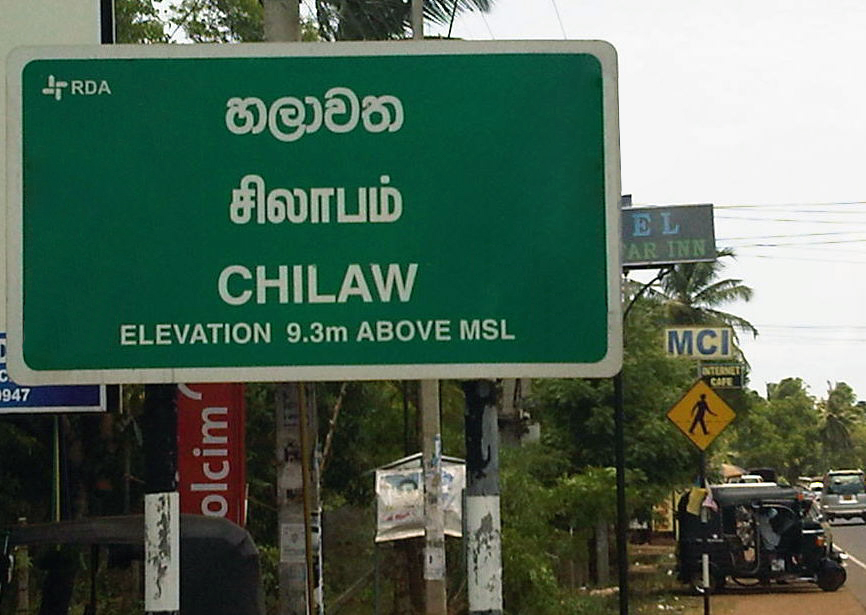
Mahatma Gandhi paid a historic visit to Chilaw in November 1927.

== The Corea Family of Chilaw ==
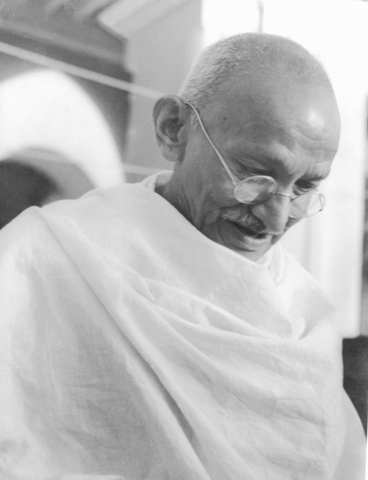
Mahatma Gandhi visited the Corea Family in Chilaw in 1927.

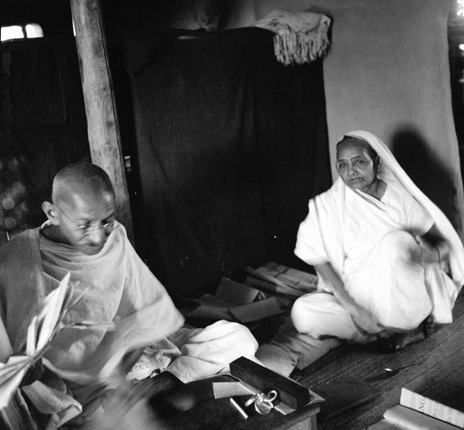
Gandhi and his wife Kasturba were Chief Guests at a banquet held in 'Sigiriya.'

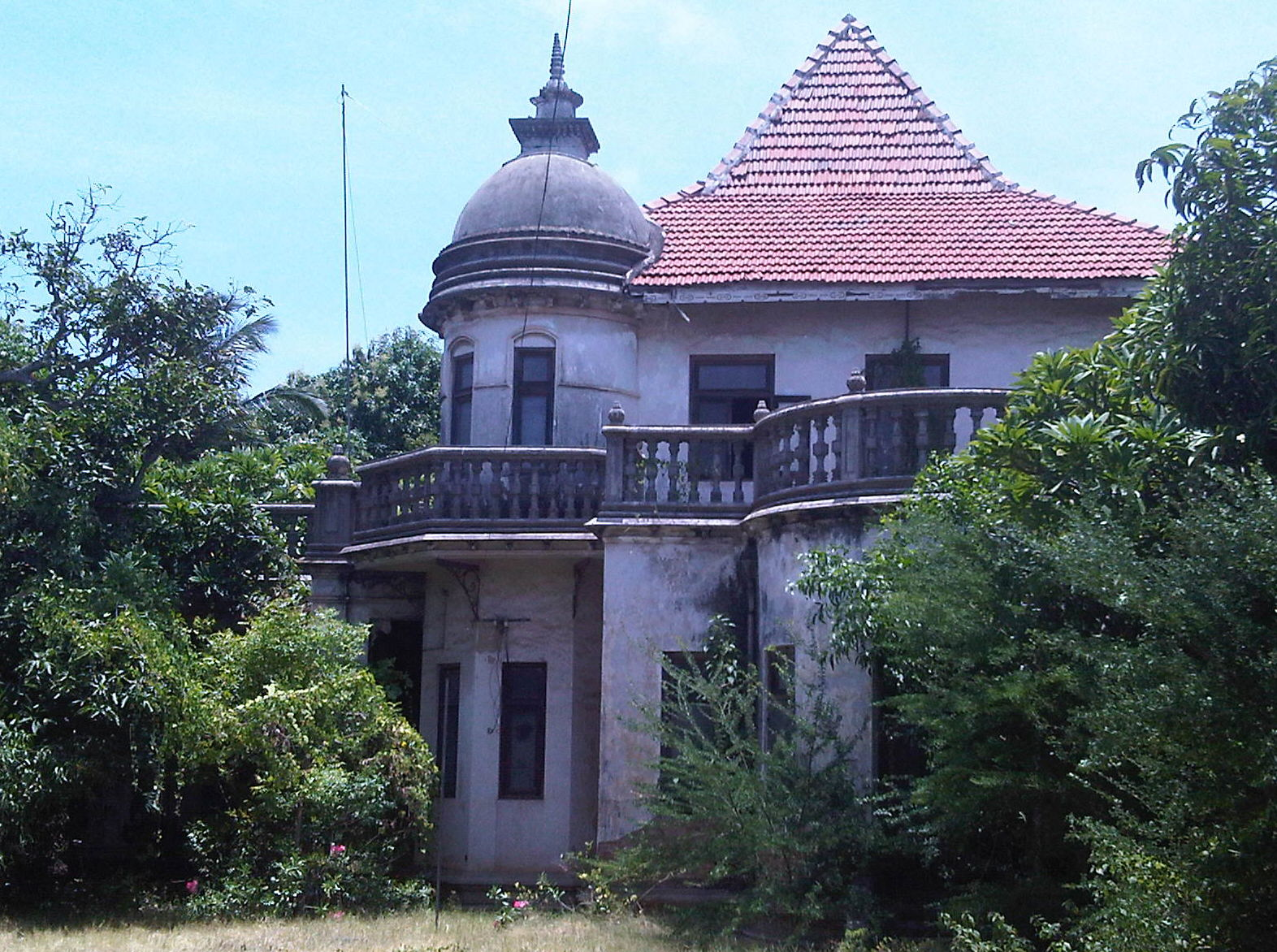
Mahatma Gandhi, his wife Kasturba and entourage stayed with the Corea Family in this historic home called 'Sigiriya,' in Chilaw, on the west coast of Sri Lanka.

The Corea family who hail from the west coast town of Chilaw in Sri Lanka are direct descendants of King Dominicus Corea, also known in the Mahavamsa as the 'war hero,' Edirille Rala who was the King of Kotte and Sitawaka. The warrior king, rebelled against the colonial Portuguese forces and waged war against them.He was eventually captured by the Portuguese and executed on 14 July 1596, at the age of 31 in Colombo.

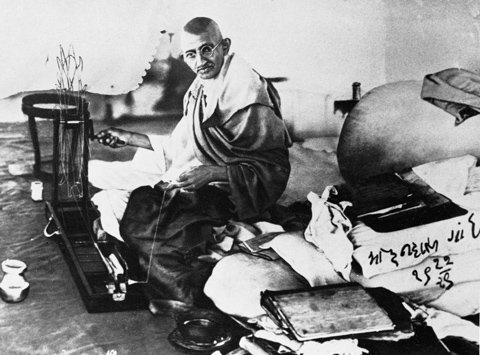
Mahatma Gandhi with his spinning wheel in 1929. On his 1927 trip to Ceylon he gifted a spinning wheel and a colour poster titled 'Fighters for Swaraj,' to the Corea Family in Chilaw.

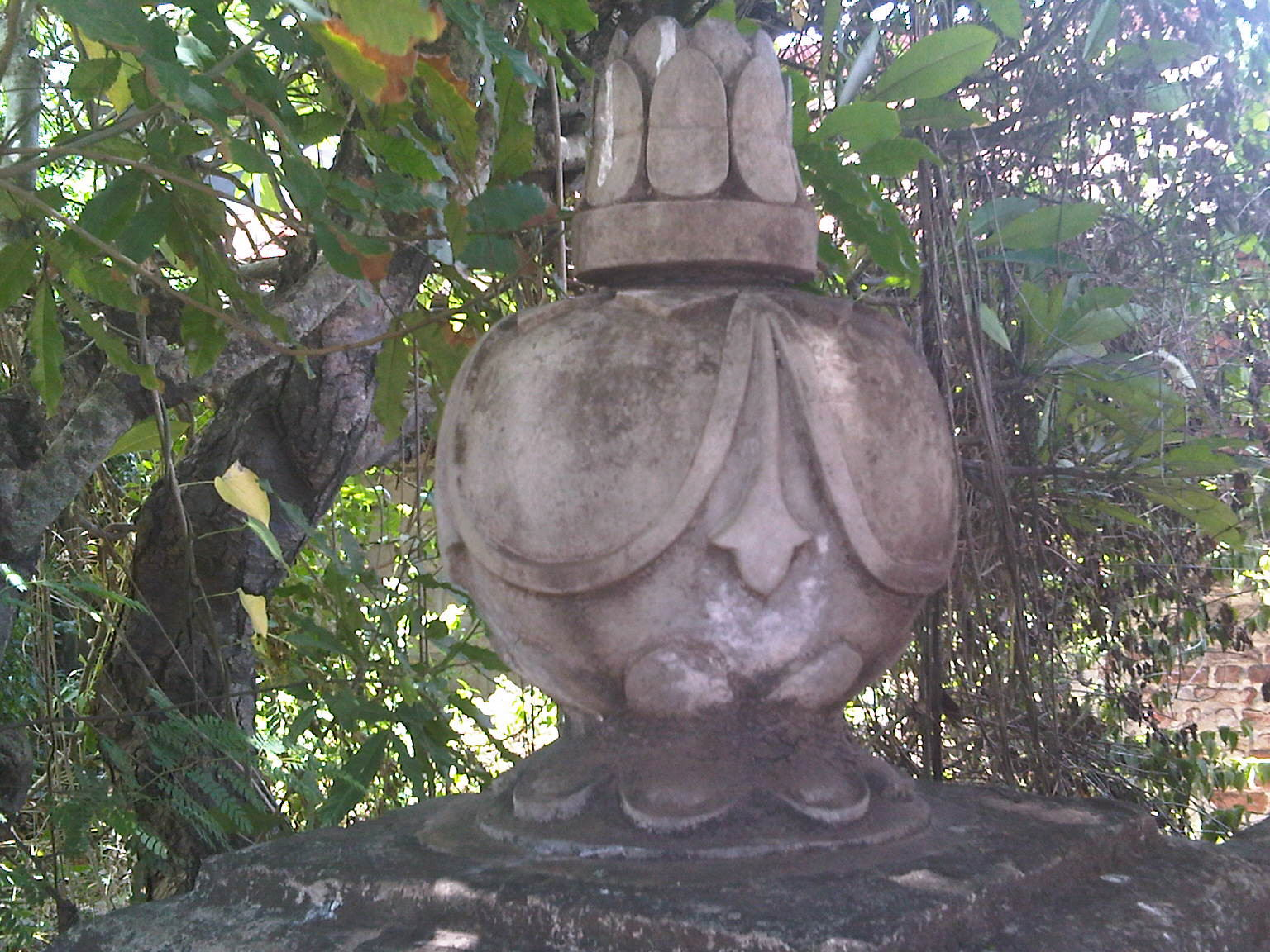
The ornate pillars of 'Sigiriya,' the iconic home in Chilaw - Mahatma Gandhi stayed here during his visit.

The Sri Lankan author, Kumari Jayawardena, writing about the Coreas noted: 'Unconnected to the liquor trade but making their money on plantation ventures was the Corea Family of Chilaw, an influential goyigama group with a history going back to Portuguese rule when they were warriors to Sinhala kings. During Dutch and British rule, members of the family were officials serving the state in various ways and rewarded with titles.Some members of the family took to the legal and medical professions, most notably the sons of Charles Edward Corea (a solicitor), who were active in local politics and in the Chilaw Association which campaigned against British land policies - especially the Waste Lands Ordinance, and for political reforms. The most active of Corea's sons was C.E.(Charles Edgar) who spoke up for peasant rights and was militant in his stand against the government. He was President of the Ceylon National Congress in 1924. C.E.Corea's brother, Alfred Ernest, was a doctor and the youngest Victor Corea was a lawyer who achieved fame for leading a campaign (and going to jail) in 1922 to protest the Poll Tax on all males; he was the first President of the Ceylon Labour Union led by A.E.Goonesinha and was active in the Ceylon Labour Party. While being professionals and political activists, the Coreas were also important landowners. '

== Gandhi visits Chilaw ==
Both C.E.Corea and Victor Corea had been in constant touch with Mahatma Gandhi during India's struggle for independence. They invited Gandhi to visit Ceylon in 1927. Gandhi travelled from India to Ceylon arriving in Colombo, the capital city on 12 November 1927. He accompanied by his wife Kasturba, C. Rajagopalachari, and the latter's daughter, Lakshmi. Also accompanying Mahatma Gandhi on his visit to Ceylon were his secretaries, Mahadev Desai and Pyarelal. Gandhi stayed in Ceylon for three weeks.He travelled the length and breadth of the country. His visit caused a great deal of excitement.

The people of Ceylon were calling for greater independence from the British who had ruled the country since 1815 having taken over the island from the Dutch. Gandhi was struck by the country's natural beauty. He noted it was "unsurpassed on the face of the earth". Gandhi described Ceylon as a "resplendent pendant" on the Indian necklace.

Muralidhar Reddy writing in The Hindu newspaper in India said: 'During his one and only extensive visit to Ceylon from 12 November – 2 December 1927, on the invitation of Ceylonese freedom fighter C.E. Corea, Gandhiji left his footprints in and around Chilaw. He toured and spoke to the people of Chilaw and stayed for a few days in a Corea home called ‘Sigiriya’ in the heart of town. Such was the enthusiasm generated by his visit that a village near Chilaw by name Nainamadama was renamed ‘Swarajya Pura’.'

Christobel Aturupane writing in the Daily News of Sri Lanka recalled Mahatma Gandhi's visit to Chilaw: 'In 1927 when Gandhi came to Ceylon, he was invited to Chilaw by C.E. Corea, Chairman of the Chilaw Association. C.E. Corea fought relentlessly for Swaraj and the British bureaucracy wilted under his elegant verbal thrusts and it was remarked that 'what Chilaw said today, Colombo thought on the morrow', chiefly owing to the influence of C.E. Corea.

Gandhi arrived in Chilaw with his entourage and was a revered guest at 'Sigiriya' where he stayed for some days. My mother recalled her visits as a teenager to her Uncle's home to see the distinguished guest. To her, the Mahatma seemed meek and humble in his loin-cloth and bare body, yet full of power and vision. His eyes, she noticed in particular, were calmly compelling. She felt she was standing in the presence of a 'King among men'. to her, those visits were redolent of oranges - her father's car was laden with oranges from the estate for the visitors. Her younger sister Ira, favoured God-daughter of Uncle Jimmy, recalled travelling to a meeting, ensconced in the back seat of her car between Gandhi and her Uncle.

Doreen was nine years old at the time of Gandhi's visit, and what she remembers vividly is the mammoth reception accorded to Gandhi at the Court House premises. She remembers when her younger sister Nan, attired in a blue half-saree, stepped out to garland the Mahatma, he embraced her and called her "Gandhi's little sweetheart". Dates and goat's milk were served to the visitors at 'Sigiriya' and she remembers in particular, the Spinning Wheel Gandhi presented to her father, C.E. Corea. These were memorable events in the lives of the youngsters of yesteryear and fascinating glimpses of history to us for our generation.'

According to an article in the Sunday Observer in Sri Lanka: 'When Mahatma Gandhi came to Ceylon he visited Chilaw to attend a banquet that was hosted by the Coreas at "Sigiriya" the house that belonged to Victor Corea's sister and husband. Here, Mahatma Gandhi presented a colour poster under the headline Fighters for Swaraj that featured all the national heroes of India each in oval shaped bust size photographs to Victor Corea as his photograph too was included in the poster amongst the political giants of India.

This alone was a glowing tribute to the campaign for freedom, initiated by Victor Corea that was somewhat similar to the campaign conducted in India. '

== Speeches at Buddhist schools ==
Mahatma Gandhi also visited the schools established by the Buddhist theosophical society in Ceylon and addressed the students and teachers there. During his speech at Mahinda College, Galle Gandhi stated that he was certain that the children of a nation who receive instructions in a tongue other than their own commit suicide.

"I am certain that the children of the nation that receive instructions in a tongue other than their own commit suicide. It robs them of their birthright. A foreign medium means an undue strain upon the youngsters, it robs them of all originality."

While addressing the students at Ananda College, Colombo he spoke about his love to see the school children and noted that Ceylon is a ‘beautiful island. The staff, parents and children of Ananda College raised Rs 400.86 and presented the money to Mahatma Gandhi as a donation for his ‘Khadi Collection’. On 18 November 1927 Mahatma Gandhi addressed the students of Dharmaraja College, Kandy and among others he spoke on the habit of smoking and importance of becoming a nonsmoker. He stated that,

“Why smoke, when there is no necessity for it? It is no food. There is no enjoyment in it except in the first instance through suggestion from outside. You boys if you are good boys, if you are obedient to your teachers and parents, omit smoking and whatever you save out of this, please send on to me for the famishing millions of India.”

== See also ==
- Dominicus Corea
- Charles Edgar Corea
- Victor Corea
- Mahatma Gandhi
- Chilaw
- List of political families in Sri Lanka
- Edirimanne Corea Family Union

== Bibliography ==
- The Mahavamsa - History of Sri Lanka, The Great Chronicle of Sri Lanka
- Ceylon and the Portuguese, 1505-1658 By P.E. Peiris (1920)
- Great Sinhalese Men and Women of History - Edirille Bandara (Domingos Corea) By John M. Senaveratna, (1937)
- A History of Sri Lanka By Professor K.M.De Silva (1981)
- Twentieth Century Impressions of Ceylon: Its History, People, Commerce, Industries and Resources By A.W. Wright, Asian Educational Services, India; New Ed edition (15 Dec 2007)
