= Victor Corea =

Sri Lankan politician (1871–1962)

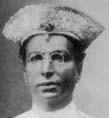
- Born: 29 January 1871; Chilaw, Sri Lanka
- Died: 6 June 1962 (age 91); Chilaw, Sri Lanka
- Education: Sri Lanka Law College; S. Thomas' College, Mount Lavinia
- Occupation: Lawyer · Legislator · Politician · Civil Rights Activist
- Political party: Ceylon National Congress; Ceylon Labour Union; Ceylon Labour Party
- Spouse(s): Sita De Alwis (m. ?; div. ?); Vivienne Nissanka (m. 1906–1962)
- Children: 13
- Parents: Charles Edward Bandaranaike Corea (father); Henrietta Seneviratne (mother)
- Family: Corea Family
- Honours: National Hero of Sri Lanka

Charles Edward Victor Seneviratne Corea (born 29 January 1871 – 6 June 1962) was a Sri Lankan lawyer, legislator, politician, civil rights activist, and anti-colonial nationalist. As a lawyer, Corea was an Advocate of the Supreme Court of Sri Lanka and unofficial member of the Legislative Council of Ceylon. As a politician, he was a founding member of the Ceylon National Congress, the founding president of the Ceylon Labour Union, and an executive member of Ceylon Labour Party, all parties focused on promoting Sri Lankan independence amidst British colonial rule in Ceylon. He is widely credited for resisting the Poll Tax in Ceylon (Sri Lanka). Corea is a descendant of King Dominicus Corea of Kotte.

== Early life ==
Charles Edward Victor Seneviratne Corea was born on 29 January 1871 into a Sinhala family of Anglican faith in Chilaw, Sri Lanka. His father, Charles Edward Bandaranaike Corea, was similarly a lawyer and a Proctor of the Supreme Court of Sri Lanka. Corea was the youngest boy of five children, including Charles Edgar Corea, James Alfred Ernest Corea, Agnes Corea, and Evangeline Corea. His father died in 1872, when he was 1 year old.

== Education ==
Corea attended the all-boys Anglican private school S. Thomas' College, Mount Lavinia in Colombo, Sri Lanka, graduating in 1889. He then attended Sri Lanka Law College (then Ceylon Law College), also in Colombo, and received admission to practice law upon the completion of his courses, exams, and apprenticeship in 1893.

== Civil service ==
=== Legal career ===
After receiving admission to practice law, Corea became an Advocate of the Supreme Court of Sri Lanka. In 1924, Corea ran for a seat as an unofficial member of the Legislative Council of Ceylon as a delegate of the Colombo Western Province, winning against E. W. Jayawardene. Corea practiced law in Chilaw, Kuliyapitiya, and Puttalam until the age of 90, 1 year before his death.

=== Political activity ===
Much of Corea's political activity occurred in and around the 1920s. During its formation in the late 1910s, Corea was elected a founder member of the Ceylon National Congress. In September 1922, he was elected as the founding president of the Ceylon Labour Union. He was also on the executive board of the Ceylon Labour Party, upon its formation in 1928. All of these parties and committees were or still are largely characterised by their promotion of Sri Lankan independence amidst British colonial rule in Ceylon, including what was colloquially called the "Ceylonisation" (i.e., localisation) of the public services. Corea shared many anti-colonial political views with his older brother, Charles Edgar Corea, who was a fellow lawyer, and often collaborated in political affairs.

=== Poll tax and imprisonment ===
During British colonial rule in Ceylon, every male over the age of 21 had to pay the British Empire a Poll Tax of 2 rupees. In an act of civil disobedience in 1921, Corea refused to pay the tax. Corea then wrote a letter to then Governor of British Ceylon, Sir William Henry Manning, stating that he ought to be arrested according to colonial law. Corea was imprisoned for about 1 month, during which he was forced to do prison labour. However, Corea amassed a significant public following upon his arrest, resulting in his eventual release from prison and subsequent abolishment of the Poll Tax. Upon his release, Corea addressed the public at the Tower Hall Theatre, promoting anti-colonial nationalism in his speech.

=== Gandhi's visit (1927) ===
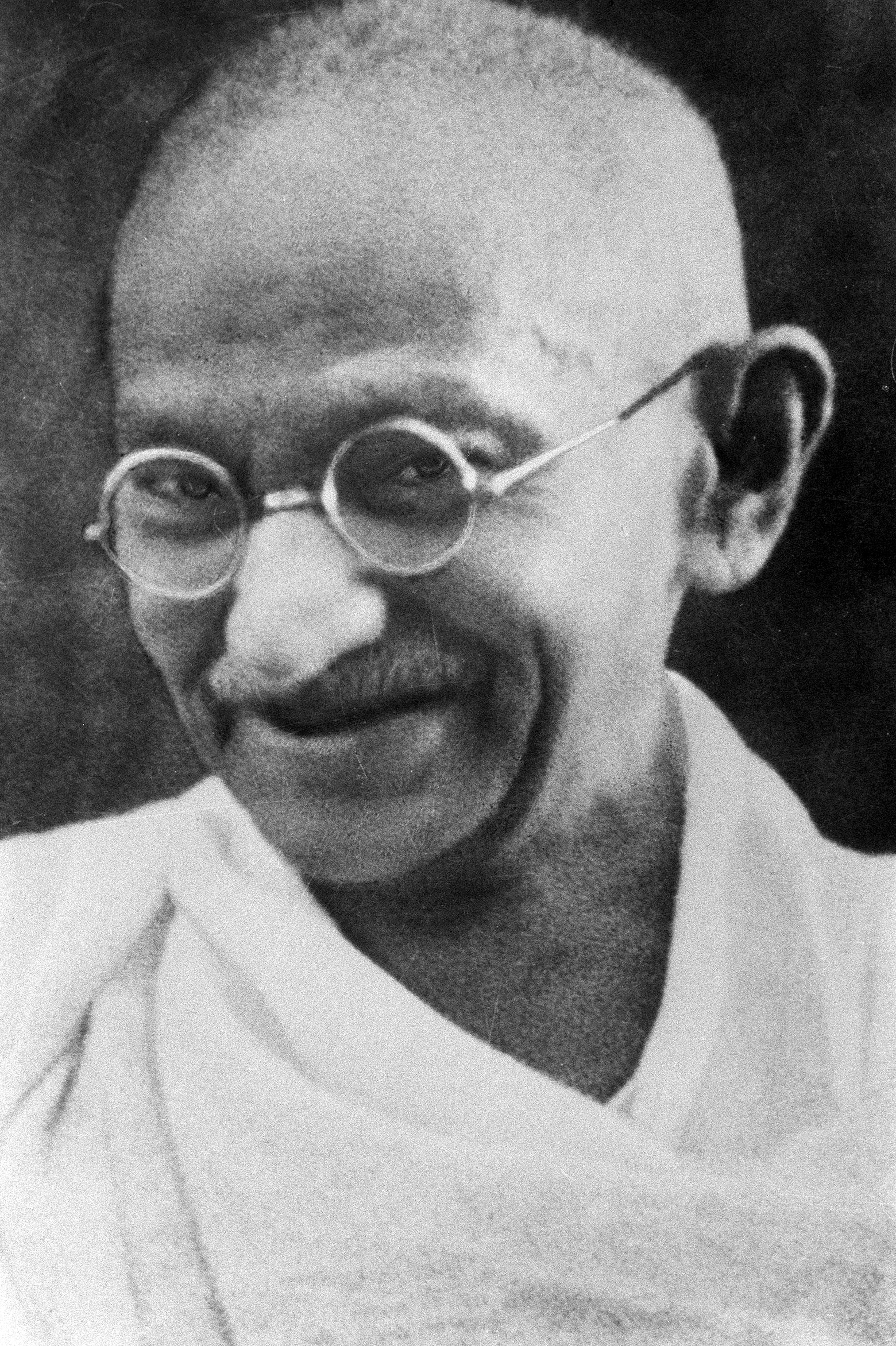
Mahatma Gandhi

During his political career, Victor Corea and his brother Charles had been in contact with Mahatma Gandhi, famed Indian lawyer, anti-colonial nationalist and political ethicist. Gandhi visited Ceylon in 1927 to tour the country amidst its independence movement, and stayed with the Corea family at their home in Chilaw. Gandhi is alleged to have gifted Corea with a poster titled Fighters for Swaraj (i.e., fighters for self-rule) which featured, among other notable freedom fighters from the Indian subcontinent, Corea himself.

=== Beating of the Hēwisi Drums ===
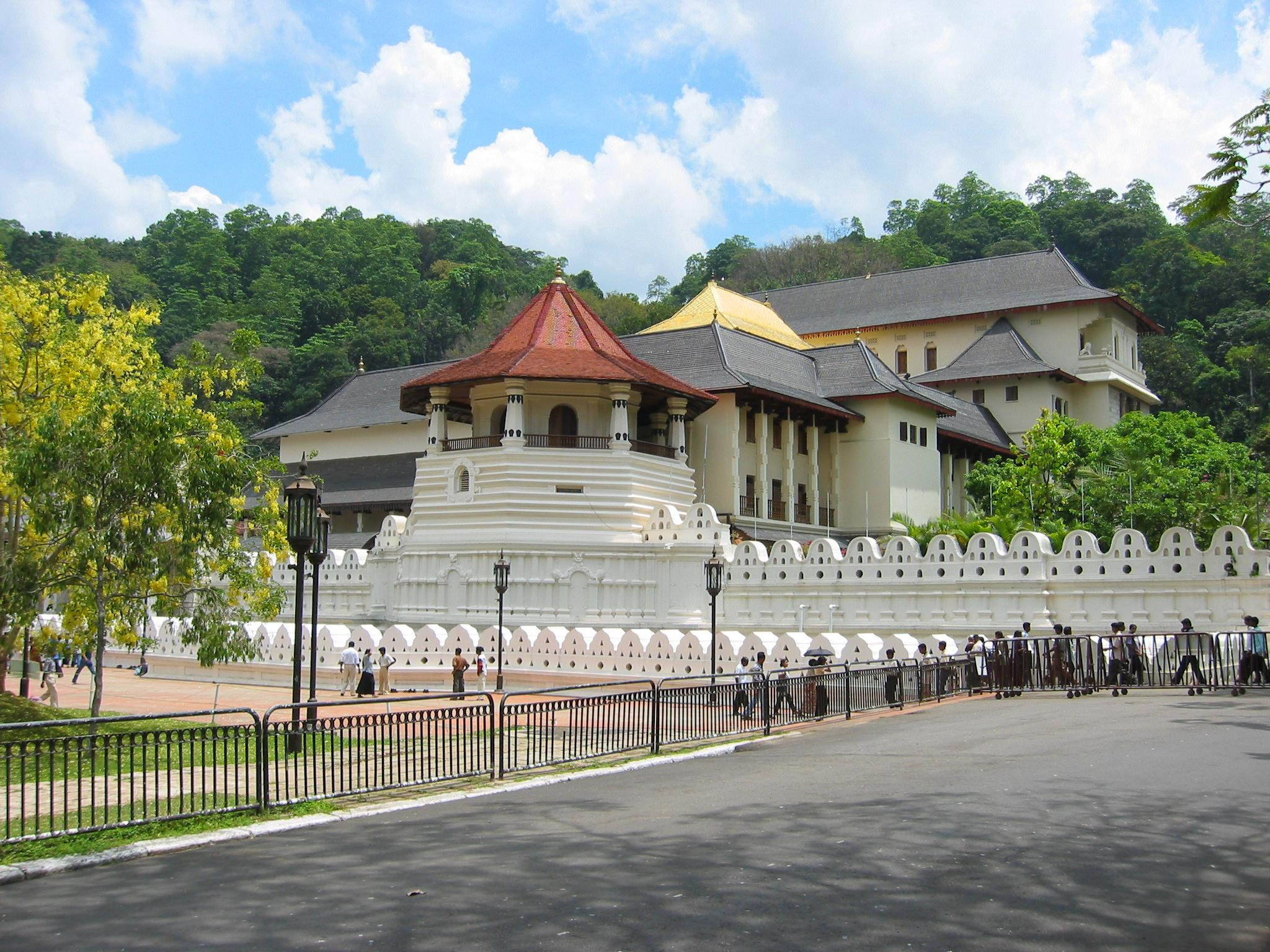
Temple of the Tooth

Hēwisi Pūjā is a Sri Lankan form of a traditional Buddhist religious music, often performed at temples. During British colonial rule in Ceylon, the beating of the Hēwisi drums at the Temple of the Tooth or Sri Dalada Maligawa (Sinhala: ශ්‍රී දළදා මාළිගාව) in Kandy, Sri Lanka was ordered to be stopped by a British Official who resided in the area under the pretence of public disturbance. In an act of civil disobedience against British administrative authority, Corea ordered the Diyawadana Nilame (office of the temple's chief lay custodian) to order the temple to resume the beating of the drums or that he would 'beat them himself'. Corea also allegedly sardonically informed the Official that he should change his residence before undermining longstanding cultural and religious traditions. Fearing a larger revolt, the order was revoked by the Official.

== Personal life and family ==
Corea remained in his hometown of Chilaw for most of his life. He was married twice, and had 13 children.

His first marriage was to Sita Corea née de Alwis, until the two divorced. They had 4 sons, Carlton, Siddhartha, Norman, Eric, and 1 daughter, Sara. Said to have been influenced by his grandfather, Corea's eldest grandson from this marriage, Deshamanya Dr. Gamani Corea, was the secretary-general of the United Nations Conference on Trade and Development and Under-Secretary-General of the United Nations from 1974 to 1984. Likewise inspired, his great-grandson Radheesh Ameresekere is a legal & political philosopher, trained at Harvard University and McGill University.

His second marriage was to Vivienne Corea née Nissanka, from 1906 until his death in 1962. They had two sons, Sri Sangabo and Edward Charles Vickrema, and six daughters, Leila, Ratna, Rupa, Chandrani, Lihini, and Indira.

== Death and legacy ==
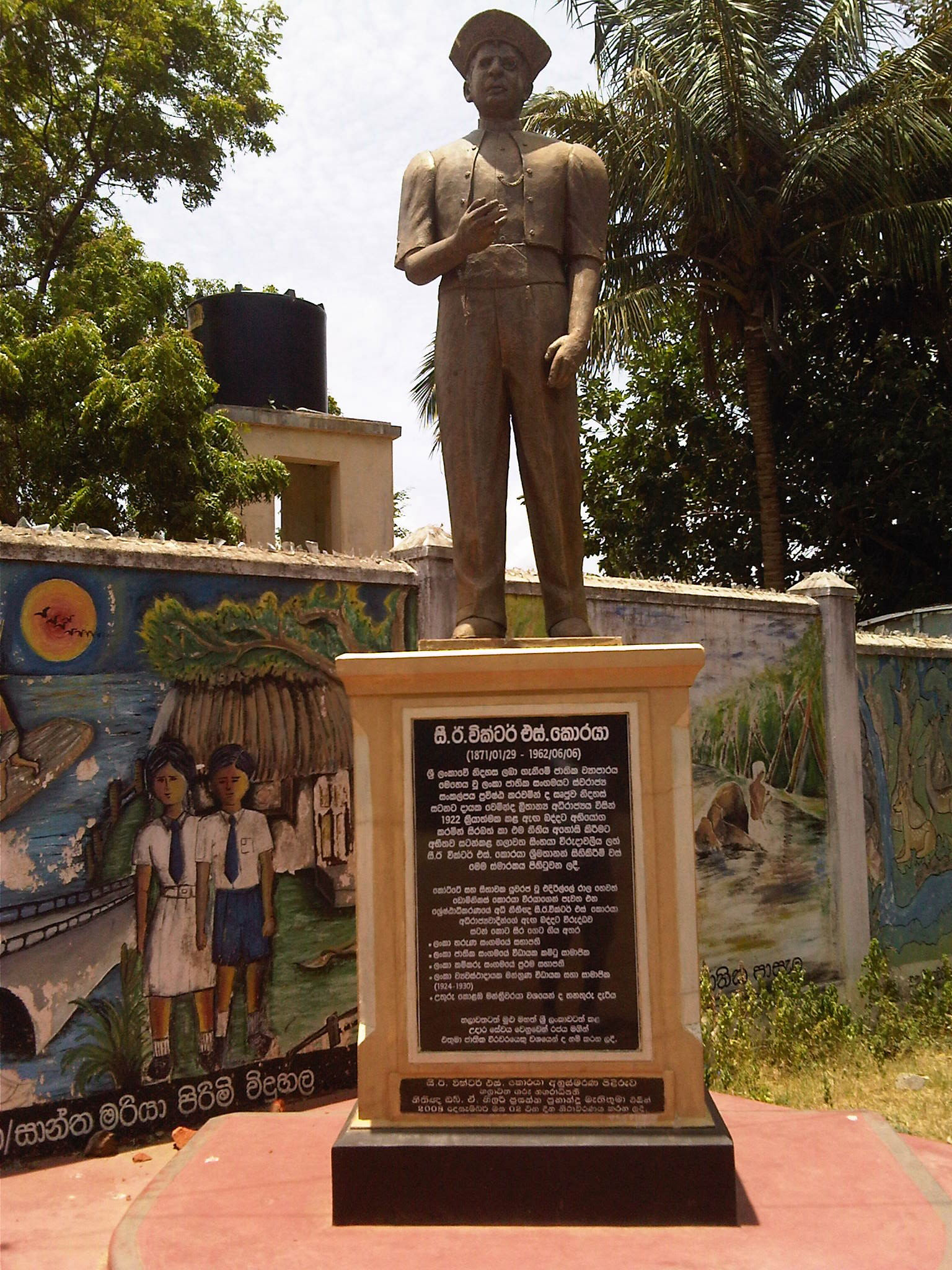
The statue of Corea

Corea died on 6 June 1962, at 91 years old. He is buried at the Chilaw Cemetery, in Chilaw, Sri Lanka.

Corea was posthumously awarded the title of National Hero of Sri Lanka by the President of Sri Lanka. The award is given to those who have made an "especially meritorious contribution to the historical struggle or national interests of the Democratic Socialist Republic of Sri Lanka" or who are "considered to have played a major role in fighting for the freedom of the country". The title is equivalent to the modern Honorfic of Sri Lankabhimanya (Sinhala: ශ්‍රී ලංකාභිමාන්‍ය, Tamil: சிறீ லங்காபிமான்ய) it has been given to approximately 135 people in its history.

On 2 December 2008, the city of Chilaw paid tribute to Corea for his legal and political efforts in service of Sri Lankan independence by having a statue of him erected in his hometown. The statue was sculpted by Kalasoori Ariyawansa Weerakkody.

== See also ==
- National Heroes of Sri Lanka
- Dominicus Corea
- Charles Edward Bandaranaike Corea
- Charles Edgar Corea
- List of political families in Sri Lanka
- Edirimanne Corea Family Union
- Sri Lankan independence activist
- Sri Lankan independence movement
- Govigama
- List of Govigama people
- Mahatma Gandhi's visit to Chilaw, Sri Lanka

== Bibliography ==
- Senaveratna, John M. (1937). Great Sinhala Men and Women of History: Edirille Bandara (Domingos Corea). The Ceylon Examiner Press.
- Seneviratna, Anuradha. (1979). "Pañactūrya Nāda and Hēwisi Pūjā." Ethnomusicology. 23 (1): 49–46.
- Wright, Arnold. (2007). Twentieth Century Impressions of Ceylon: Its History, People, Commerce, Industries and Resources. Asian Educational Services.
