= Charles Edgar Corea =

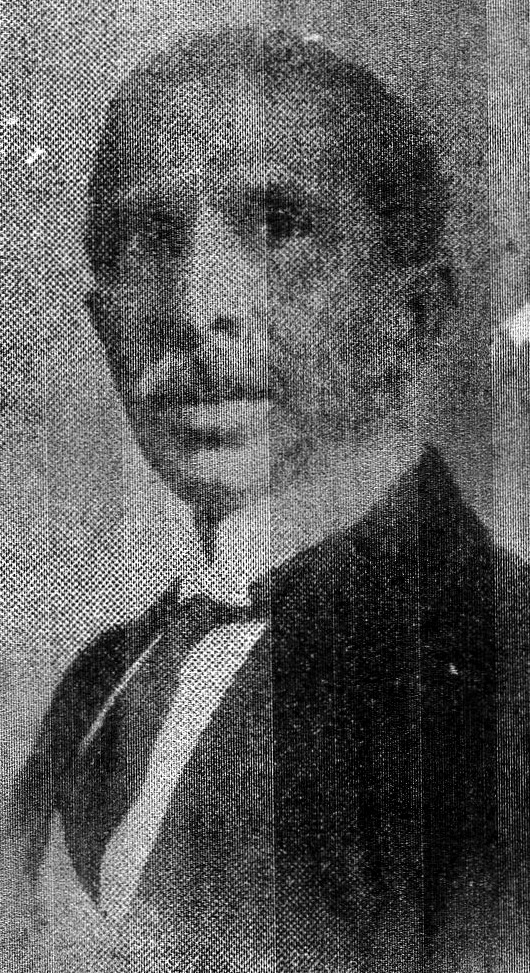
- A National Hero of Sri Lanka
- Born: 16 October 1866; Chilaw, Sri Lanka
- Died: 7 February 1946 (aged 79); Chilaw, Sri Lanka
- Education: Royal College Colombo
- Occupations: Advocate of the supreme court, member of the legislative council, president and founder member of the ceylon national congress and chair of the chilaw association.
- Title: Advocate
- Spouse: Muriel May Seneviratne
- Children: Srikuradas Charles Shirley Corea, Swarna Corea, Elaine Corea, Earle Corea, Doreen Hettiaratchy, Ernestine Corea, Leila Corea, Charles Corea, Nancy Jayasinghe
- Parent(s): Charles Edward Bandaranaike Corea and Henrietta Seneviratne

Charles Edgar Corea (16 October 1866 – 7 February 1946) was a politician and a prominent freedom fighter of Sri Lanka.

== Early life ==
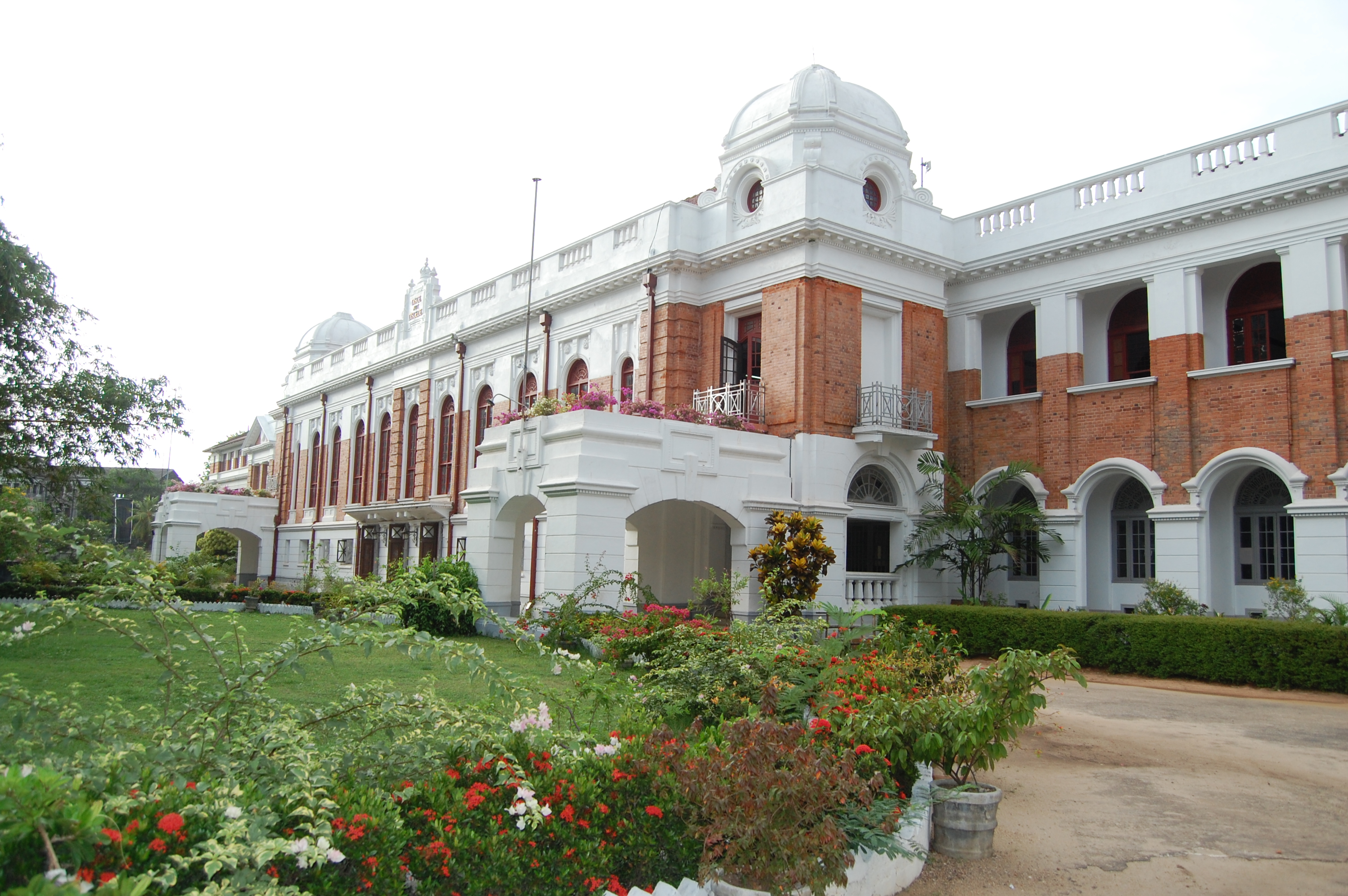
C.E.Corea was educated at the Royal College, Colombo.

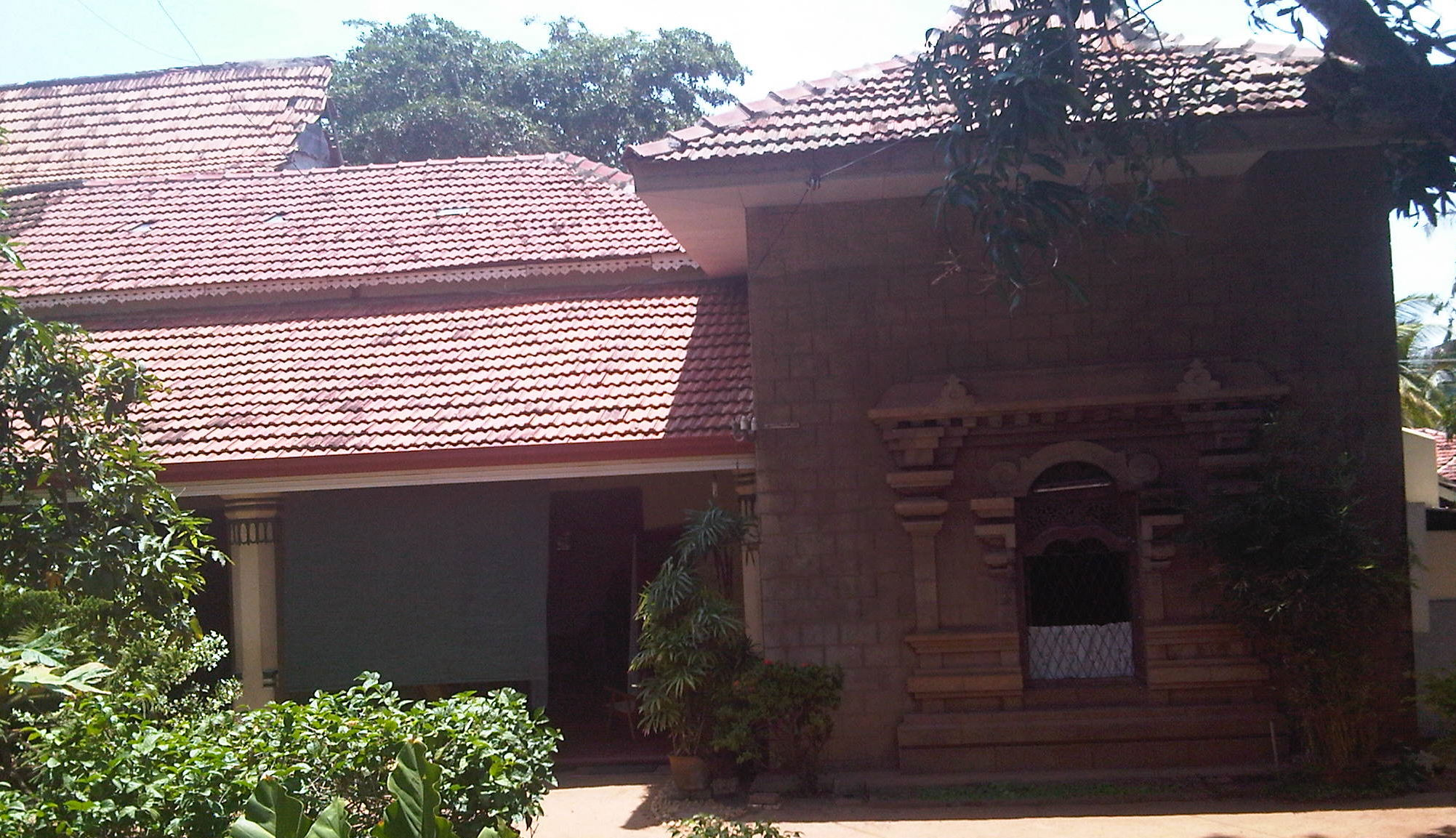
C.E.Corea lived at 'Edirille Gedera' in Chilaw, Sri Lanka. Mahatma Gandhi and distinguished Sri Lankan politicians Don Stephen Senanayake, F.R.Senanayake, Sir Baron Jayathilake, E. W. Perera, Sir Ponnambalam Ramanathan, Sir Ponnambalam Arunachalam, A. E. Goonesinha, Sir James Peiris and others have all visited this historic home.

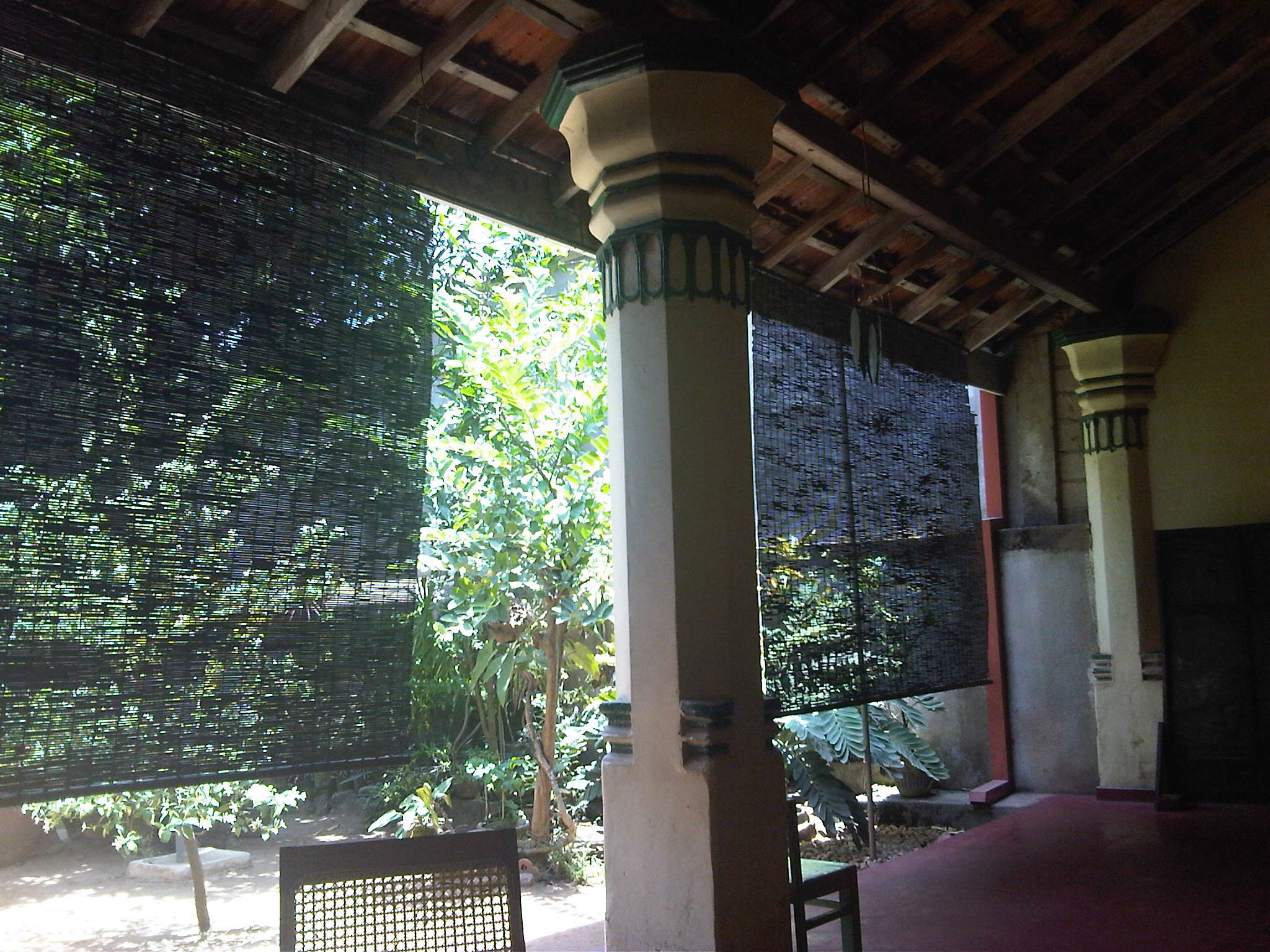
The ancient Verandah at Edirille Gedera, the home of C.E.Corea.

C.E.Corea was born in the west coast town of Chilaw, in Sri Lanka. His parents were Charles Edward Bandaranaike Corea, a leading lawyer from Chilaw and Henritta Seneviratne. He was educated at Royal College Colombo where he excelled in his studies. He earned a reputation as a first rate orator. Charles Edgar Corea was the eldest of five children. His brothers and sisters were – James Alfred Ernest Corea, Victor Corea, Agnes Corea, and Evangeline Henrietta Corea. The family came from a wealthy background, owning vast tracts of coconut estates and paddy lands. The Sunday Times newspaper of Sri Lanka writing about the three sons of Charles Edward Bandarnaike Corea, noted: 'Of the three boys, the eldest, Charles Edgar Corea, was educated at Royal College and having excelled in studies and cricket, he passed out as a proctor of the Supreme Court, took to politics and in 1924 was elected president of the Ceylon National Congress. Warden Stone of S. Thomas' College, Mount Lavinia, described old Royalist C.E. Corea as one of the finest speakers of the English language. The second boy in the family was Dr. Alfred Ernest Corea who was educated at S. Thomas' College. He passed out as a doctor of medicine and chose to practise in Chilaw. He was a clever doctor and what was unique about him was that he charged no fees from the poor for his services.'

Writing in 1907, The English author, Arnold Wright in 'Twentieth Century Impressions of Ceylon,' said: 'Charles Edward has left three sons, the eldest of whom, Charles Edgar, a Proctor, is the unofficial leader of the Chilaw Bar, a member of the Royal Asiatic Society, and Chairman of the Chilaw Association. In 1899, he was elected by the various native associations of Ceylon, and a public meeting in Colombo, to proceed to England as a delegate of the people of Ceylon, to lay before the Imperial Government a representation against the Waste Lands Ordinance. The second son, Alfred Ernest, is a physician, and the youngest, Charles Edward Victor, is an Advocate of the Supreme Court.'

The Sri Lankan author Kumari Jayawardena, writing about the Coreas noted: 'Unconnected to the liquor trade but making their money on plantation ventures was the Corea Family of Chilaw, an influential goyigama group with a history going back to Portuguese rule when they were warriors to Sinhala kings. During Dutch and British rule, members of the family were officials serving the state in various ways and rewarded with titles. Some members of the family took to the legal and medical professions, most notably the sons of Charles Edward Corea (a solicitor), who were active in local politics and in the Chilaw Association which campaigned against British land policies – especially the Waste Lands Ordinance, and for political reforms. The most active of Corea's sons was C.E.(Charles Edgar) who spoke up for peasant rights and was militant in his stand against the government. He was President of the Ceylon National Congress in 1924. C.E.Corea's brother, Alfred Ernest, was a doctor and the youngest Victor Corea was a lawyer who achieved fame for leading a campaign (and going to jail) in 1922 to protest the Poll Tax on all males; he was the first President of the Ceylon Labour Union led by A.E.Goonesinha and was active in the Ceylon Labour Party. While being professionals and political activists, the Coreas were also important landowners. '

== The Royal-Thomian Encounter of 1885 (The 9 runs match) ==
Corea was an accomplished cricketer at Royal College Colombo, he played first XI cricket for his school. He was in the Royal College team in the historic Nine Run Match played in Sri Lanka on 12 and 13 March 1885, on the CCC grounds, in Galle Face – Royal scored 9 runs, and St Thomas' replied by scoring 170 for 6. According to legend, the match was abandoned due to rain, but this has been disputed.

C.E.Corea, who was in the Royal College team, in an article in the 1932 Royal-Thomian souvenir had this to say about fielding conditions on the first day – "On the first day we batted in a deluge of rain and submitted to the leather hunting which followed over mud and sludge, weighed down in sodden clothes, up to the very minute fixed for drawing stumps, without protest or grumble".

== Political career ==
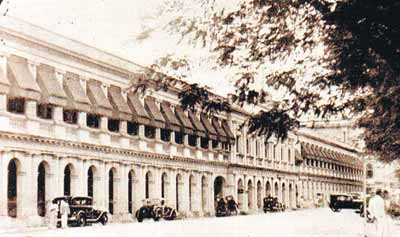
C.E. Corea earned high praise as an orator – he spoke with passion in many speeches in the chamber of the Legislative Council – he was elected as a member of the Council in 1921. The Legislative Council held their meetings here, it is now called the Republic Building in Colombo.

C.E.Corea followed in his father's footsteps by studying law. He went on to become a proctor of the Supreme Court of Ceylon. He then practised at the Chilaw court. What pre-occupied C.E.Corea was that the people of Ceylon were struggling under the British Raj. He spoke out against the injustice suffered by ordinary people at the hands of their colonial masters.

Corea became a fearless freedom fighter – together with his younger brother Victor Corea, he founded the Chilaw Association and used it to campaign hard for independence, for the people of Ceylon. He was elected a member of the Legislative Council and later a founding Member of the Ceylon National Congress, together with Victor Corea, E.W. Perera, Sir Ponnambalam Ramanathan, Sir Ponnambalam Arunachalam, and Francis de Zoysa.

C.E.Corea was elected President of the Ceylon National Congress in 1924. Corea was very much the elder statesman and gained a reputation as a moderate voice of the independence movement.

== The visit of Mahatma Gandhi to Chilaw ==
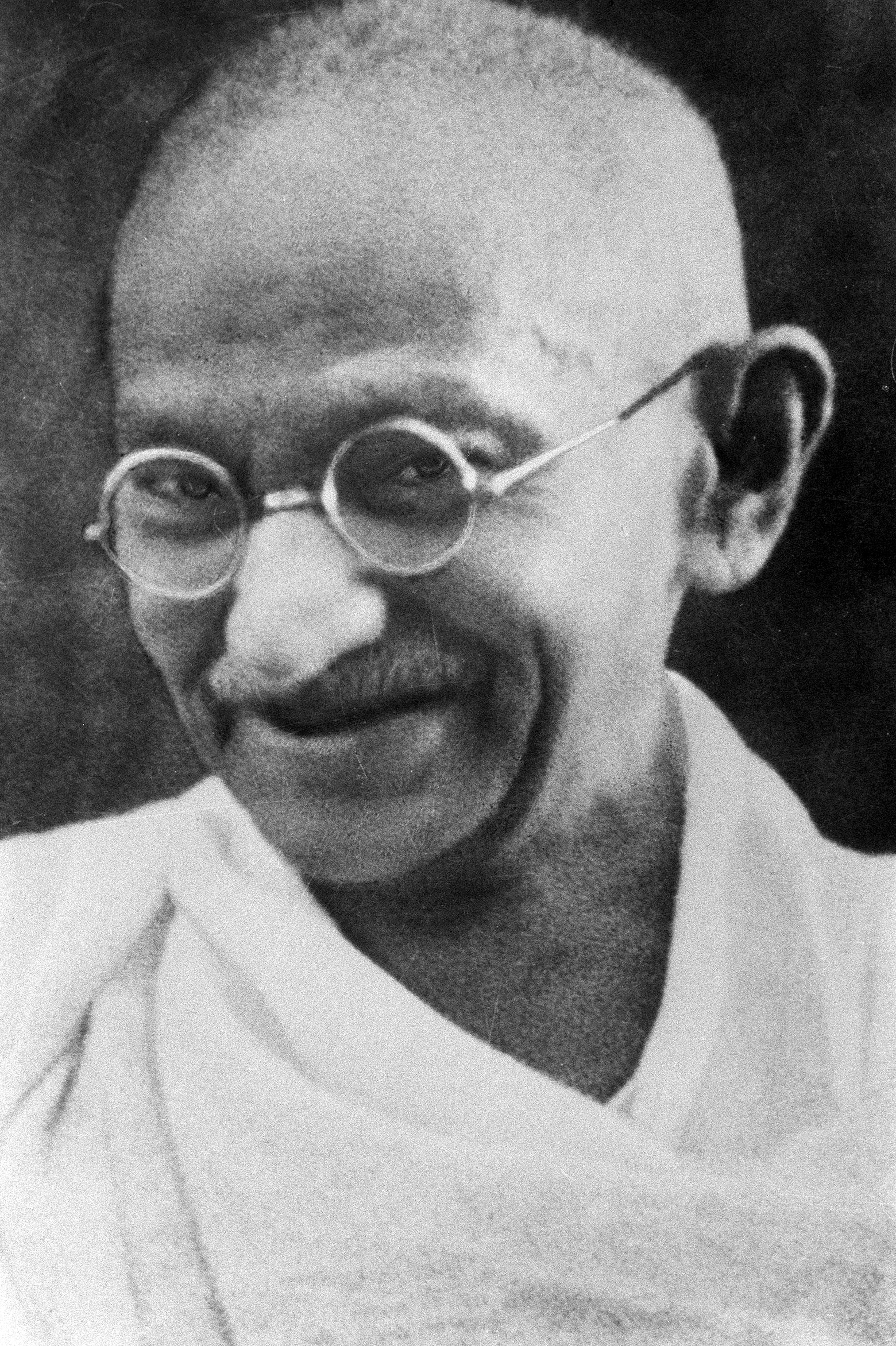
Mahatma Gandhi, the 'Father of India', visited Chilaw in 1927 on the invitation of C.E.Corea and Victor Corea, he stayed in a Corea home called 'Sigiriya.' Gandhi spent time with C.E.Corea and his family.

Mahatma Gandhi, the 'Father of India' had developed a very close relationship with C.E.Corea and his brother Victor Corea. C.E.Corea wrote many letters to Gandhi in India, on the subject of independence. Gandhi arrived on the shores of Ceylon on 12 November 1927, on his first and only visit to the island.

He was accorded a warm welcome in Colombo and he travelled all over Sri Lanka. Mahatma Gandhi made it a point to see his friends C.E.Corea and Victor Corea. A massive banquet was organised in his honour, in a Corea home called 'Sigiriya,' in Chilaw. There he met with members of the Corea Family – he stayed with the Coreas for several days.

== Death ==
He died in Chilaw on 7 February 1946. Just two years later Ceylon won her independence on 4 February 1948 thanks to the valiant efforts of freedom fighters like Charles Edgar Corea.

== See also ==
- National Heroes of Sri Lanka
- Dominicus Corea
- Charles Edward Bandaranaike Corea
- James Alfred Ernest Corea
- Victor Corea
- List of political families in Sri Lanka
- Edirimanne Corea Family Union
- Mahatma Gandhi's visit to Chilaw, Sri Lanka
- Sri Lankan independence activist
- Sri Lankan independence movement
- Govigama
- List of Govigama people

== Bibliography ==
- Great Sinhalese Men and Women of History – Edirille Bandara (Domingos Corea) By John M. Senaveratna, (1937)
- A History of Sri Lanka By Professor K.M.De Silva (1981)
- Twentieth Century Impressions of Ceylon: Its History, People, Commerce, Industries and Resources By A.W. Wright, Asian Educational Services, India; New Ed edition (15 Dec 2007)
