= Chilaw =

Chilaw හලාවත சிலாபம்
- City
- Metropolis
- Location in Sri Lanka
- Coordinates: 7°35′N 79°48′E
- Country: Sri Lanka
- Province: North Western Province
- District: Puttalam District

Government
  - Type: Urban Council
  - Body: Chilaw Urban Council
  - Chilaw: Chilaw Urban Council
  - Mayor: Sumeda Perera (NPP)
  - Deputy Mayor: Hilary Prasanna (Independent Group)
- Elevation: 3 m (9.8 ft)

Population
  - City: 62,515
  - Urban: 26,732
- Time zone: +5:30
- Postal code: 61000
- Area code: 032
- Website: chilawuc.dolgnwp.lk

Chilaw (Sinhala: හලාවත, romanized: Halāvata, Tamil: சிலாபம், romanized: Cilāpam) is a city in Puttalam District, North Western Province, Sri Lanka. It is governed by an urban council, whereas the outskirts are governed by a pradeshiya sabha of the same name. The town is located 80 kilometers away from Colombo via Negombo.

Religious composition in Chilaw DS Division according to 2012 census data is as follows Roman Catholics 28,544-45.66%, Buddhists 22,855-36.56%, Muslims 5,205-8.33%, Hindus 4,288-6.86%, Other Christians 1,609-2.57%, Others 14–0.02%.

== Etymology ==
Halāwatha(හලාවත), probably from 'Halawathara' or 'Salwathota' in Old Sinhala.

The name Chilaw derives its name from its Tamil name Cilāpam, meaning pearl fishery.

According to the historical records, Cholas landed in 'Salawattota' in 1190 A.D. Thus the basic name existed ancient times as well.

Sal(සල්), Sāla (in Pali) may refer to 'Sal trees'

== The visit of Mahatma Gandhi ==
Mahathma Gandhi, the 'Father of India,' who has actually visited Chilaw in November 1927 on his first and only journey to Sri Lanka when it was called Ceylon. This was a historic visit - Gandhi was invited to Chilaw by the freedom fighters Charles Edgar Corea and his brother Victor Corea who lived in the town. The brothers founded the Chilaw Association and the Ceylon National Congress and campaigned hard for the independence of Ceylon. The Corea family have had a strong link with Chilaw. There is a saying in Sri Lanka that Chilaw is well known for the three 'C's' - crabs, coconuts and Coreas.

== Munneswaram Temple ==
Tourists visit the well known Hindu temple located in Munneswaram, situated in the historic Demala Pattuva ("Tamil division") region of Puttalam District. The main festivals celebrated at the temple include Navarathri and Sivarathri. The former is a nine-day-long festival in honour of the presiding Goddess, while the latter is an over-night observation in honour of Lord Shiva. In addition to these two Hindu festivals, the temple observes the four-week-long Munneswaram festival which is attended by both Hindus and Buddhists. During the festival, traders sell hand-painted clay models of animals such as deer, money box tills and 'raban' (traditional hand drums) from stalls all over the town.

== Further Sights ==
Chilaw is famous for Our Lady of Mount Carmel Cathedral. The seat of the Chilaw Diocese, this cathedral dating from 1851 has a history of more than two centuries. According to legend, 200 years ago, most of what is now Chilaw Town was covered by a forest. A woman was searching for firewood and heard the sound of a lady speaking, "Please take me". She stopped her work and searched for the source of the sound. A statue of Mother Mary was on a tree. The woman took the statue and handed over it to the parish priest who recognized it as Our Lady of Mount Carmel. Many believe that this same statue now stands in the cathedral. Many in Chilaw celebrate the feast of Our Lady of Mount Carmel is celebrated every July. During the feast season of Our Lady Of Mount Carmel, the town is fully decorated in homage to Mother Mary.

== Traffic connections ==
Chilaw has a railway station, 82 km from Colombo, on the Puttalam line which was extended to Chilaw in 1916.

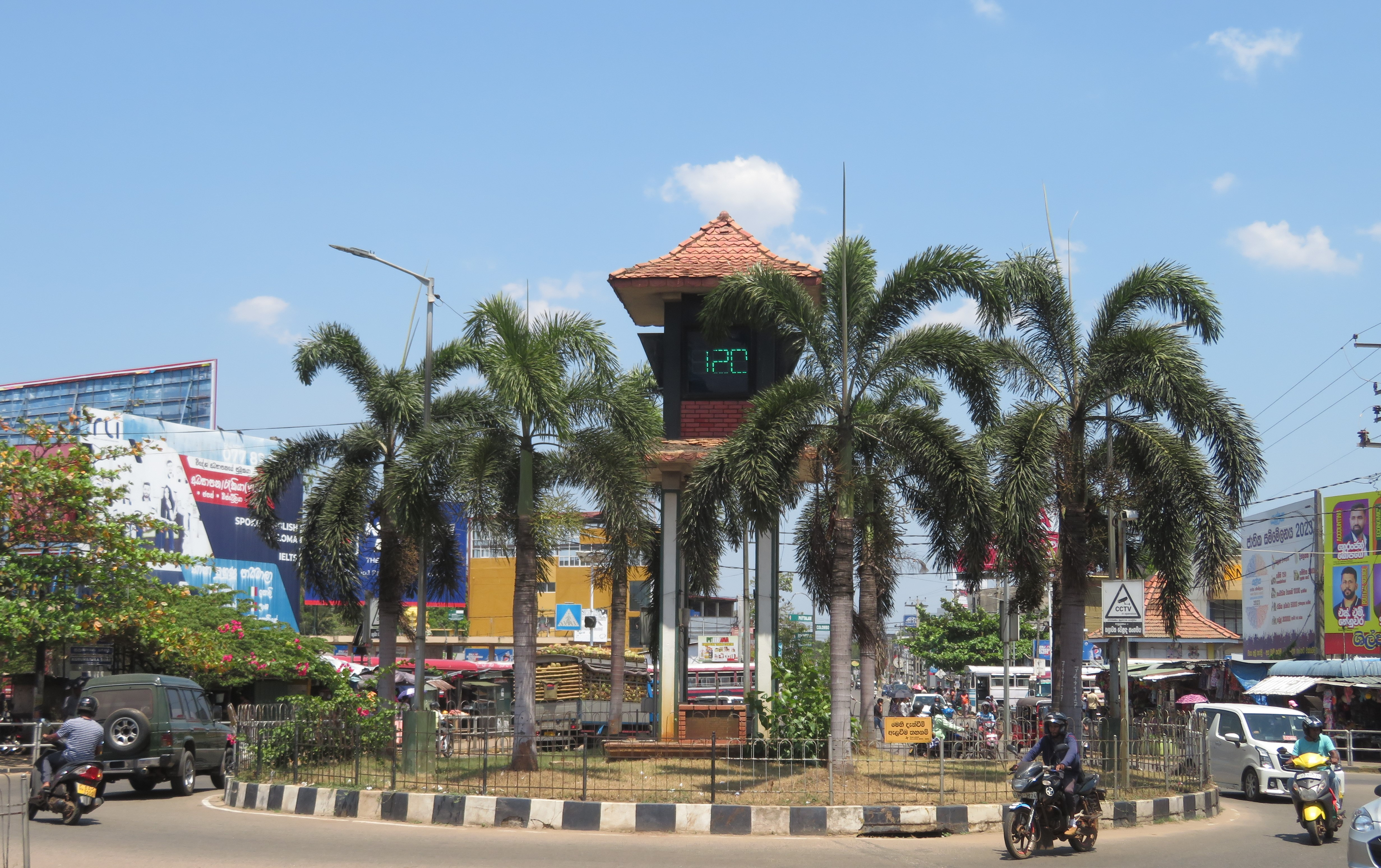
Clock tower

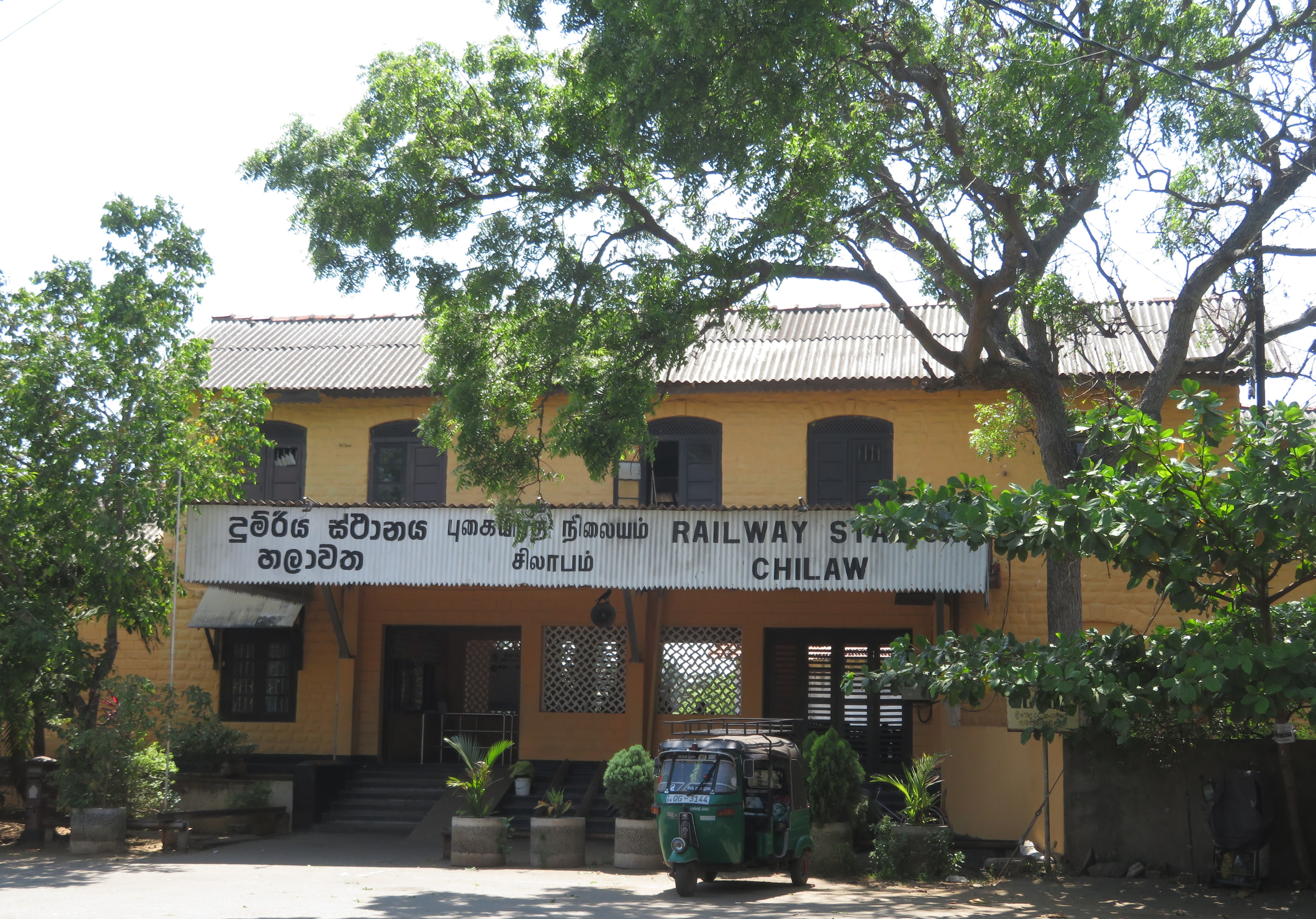
Chilaw railway station

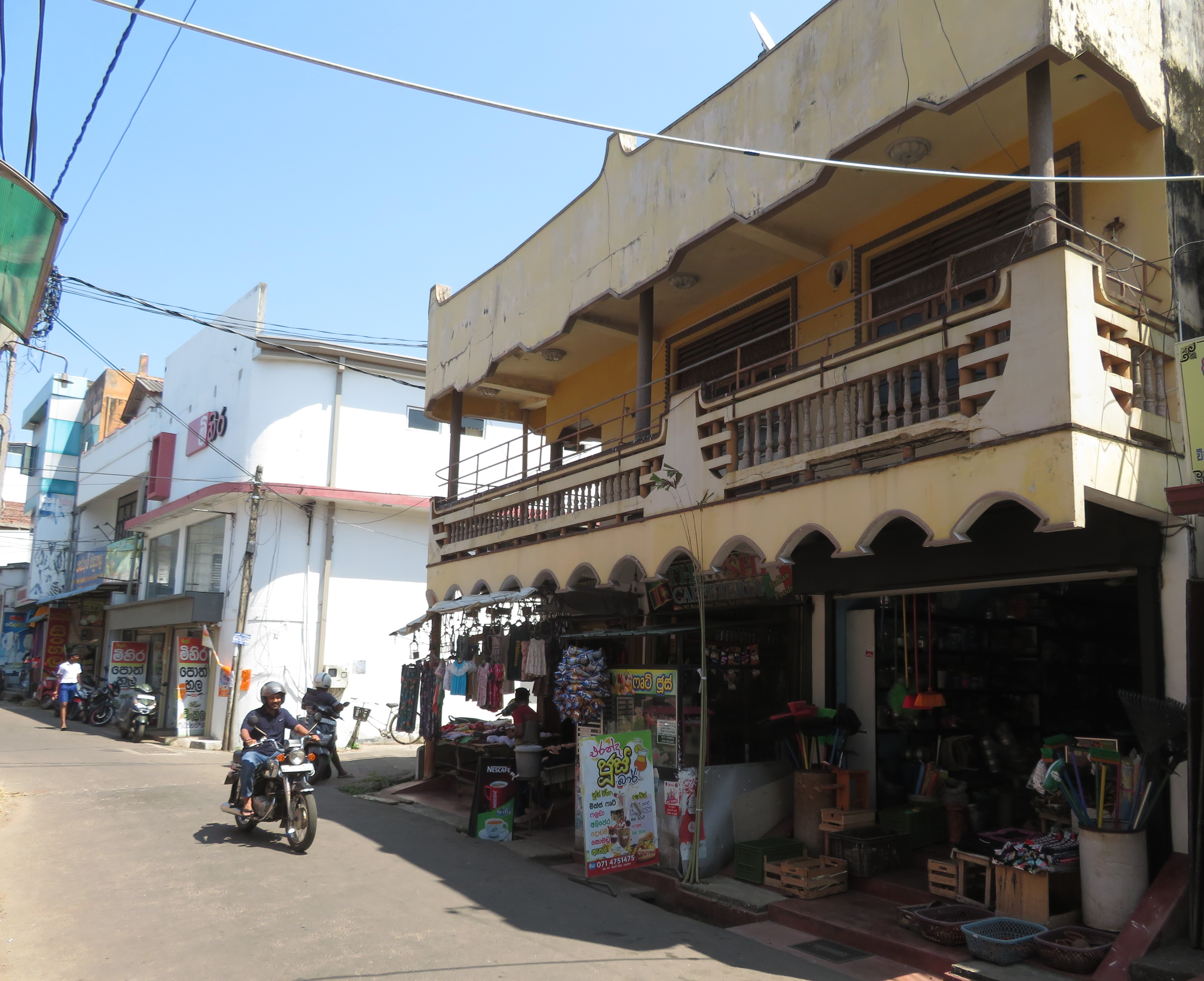
Bazar Street

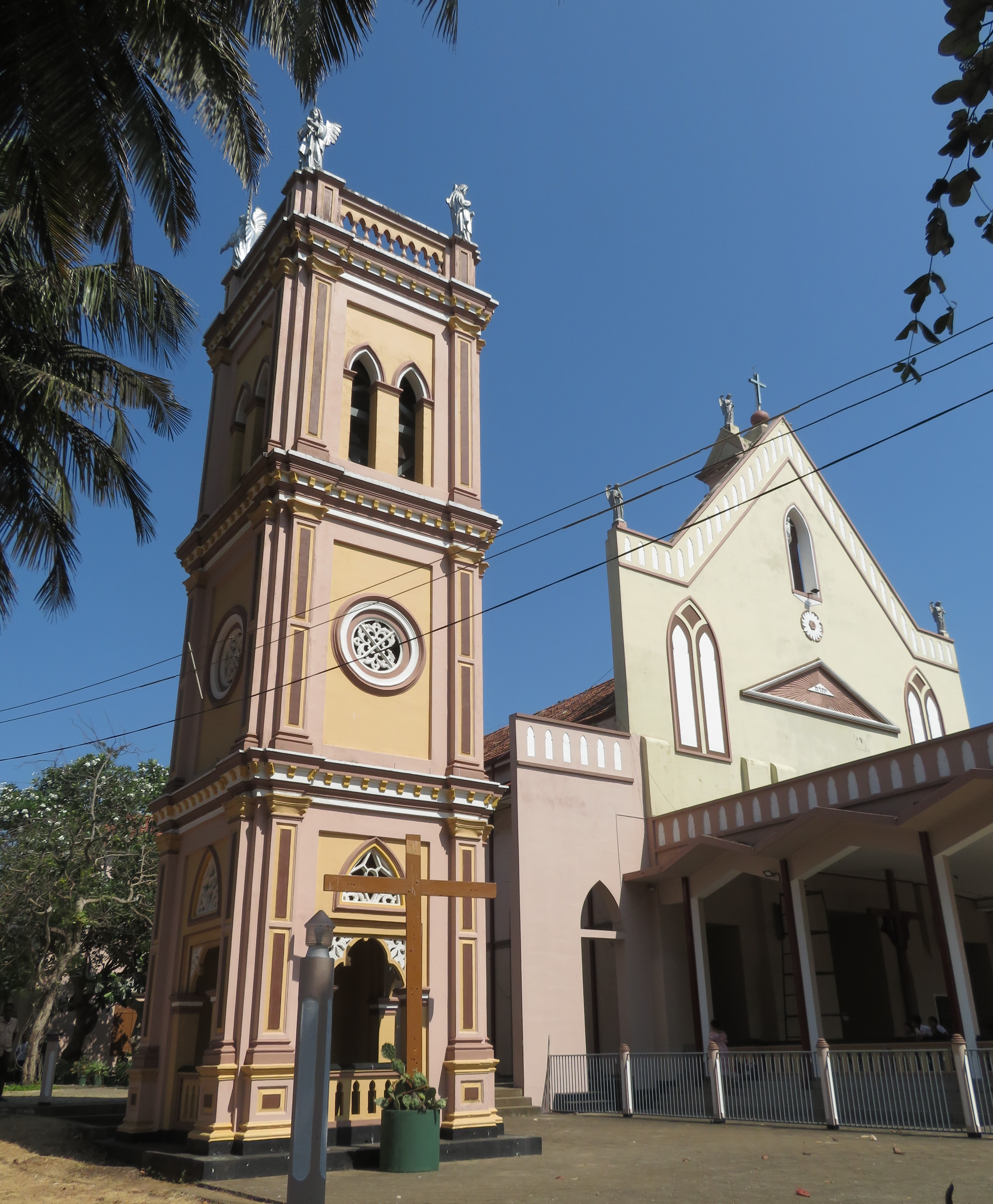
St. Mary's Cathedral

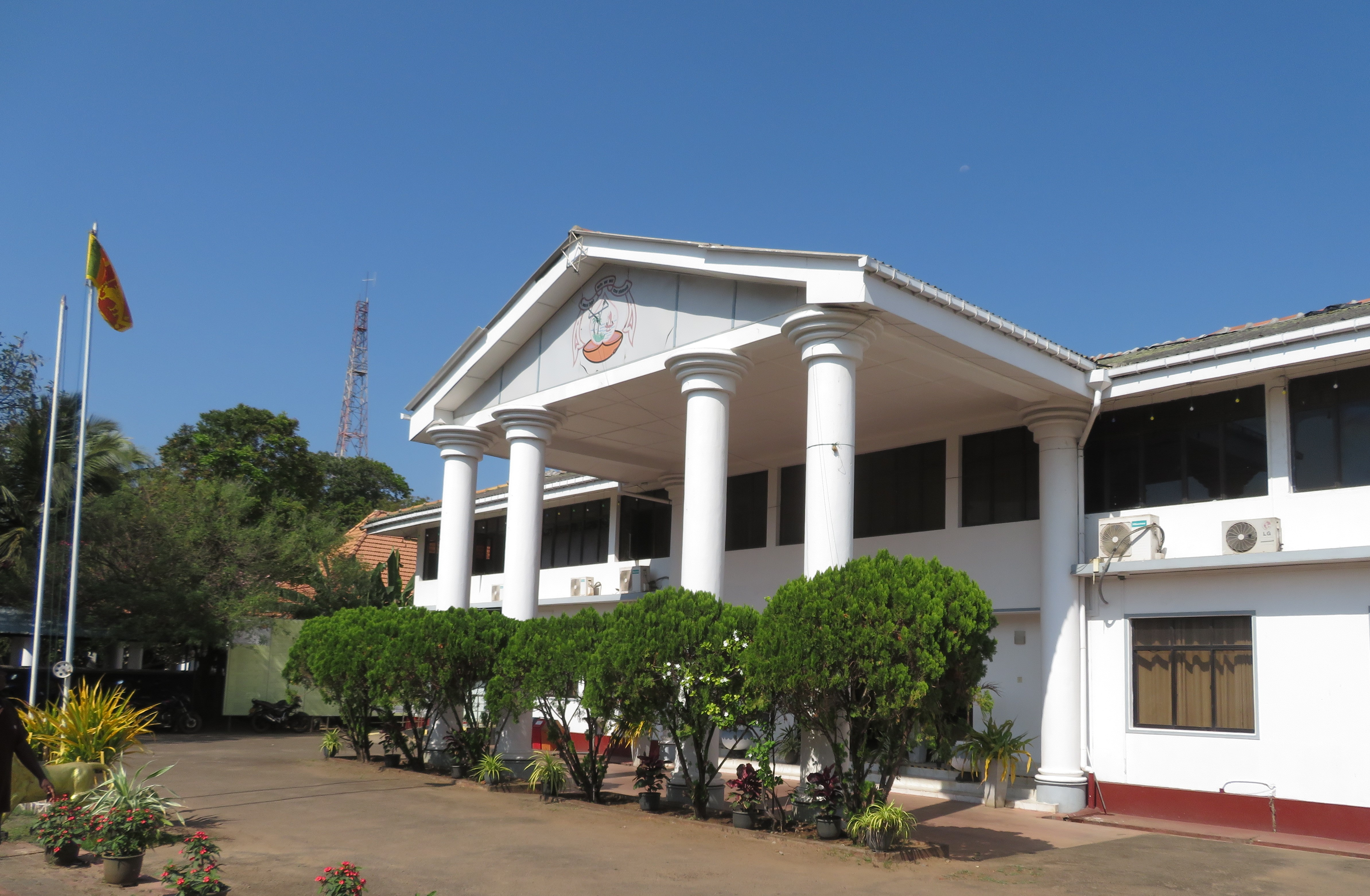
City Hall

== See also ==
- Edmund Peiris (Bishop of Chilaw)
- Chilaw Marians Cricket Club

== Bibliography ==
- The Mahavamsa - History of Sri Lanka, The Great Chronicle of Sri Lanka
- Ceylon and the Portuguese, 1505-1658 By P.E. Peiris (1920)
- Great Sinhalese Men and Women of History - Edirille Bandara (Domingos Corea) By John M. Senaveratna, (1937)
- A History of Sri Lanka By Professor K.M.De Silva (1981)
- Twentieth Century Impressions of Ceylon: Its History, People, Commerce, Industries and Resources By A.W. Wright, Asian Educational Services, India; New Ed edition (15 December 2007)

== Maps ==
- Detailed map of Chilaw and Sri Lanka
