= Kanda Surinduni =

Sri Lankan song

Kanda Surinduni ("O Lord God of the Mountain") is a Sri Lankan song composed by Clarence Wijewardena. It was originally performed by the Super Golden Chimes with Wijewardene at vocals in the mid-1970s.

The lyrics of the song present a prayer of praise to the god Kataragama in the point of view of a pilgrim visiting the shrine in the Sri Lankan city of the same name; the hook translates to "I have come to worship you, I have come to see you." With the religious lyrics, the song's melody is festive and secular, in the style of Sri Lankan baila. Clarence & the group performed the song at Katharagama in the traditions of worshipping the God Skandha or the God of Katharagama.

The song goes in the 6/8 beat. It speeds up at the end near to the tempo of a kavadi dance. The song was inspired by the practice of Kavadi dancing at the Kataragama temple. 'Kanda Surinduni' went on to become a huge hit over the airwaves of Radio Ceylon in South Asia. The song was played by the legendary Radio Ceylon broadcaster, Vernon Corea on his radio programmes on the English Services of the station and in 1976 on his popular BBC radio programme London Sounds Eastern on BBC Radio London.

== See also ==
- Radio Ceylon
- Sri Lanka Broadcasting Corporation
- Clarence Wijewardena
- Annesley Malewana
