= Piyaneni =

Single by Clarence Wijewardena, Annesley Malewana, Super Golden Chimes
- Released: 1972
- Recorded: At Augie Ranaweera's Studio in Bambalapitiya, Colombo
- Genre: Sri Lankan Pop
- Songwriter: Clarence Wijewardena
- Producer: Clarence Wijewardena

Piyaneni is a classic Sri Lankan pop song composed by the Sri Lankan musician, Clarence Wijewardena. It is a tribute in song to the love of a father. Wijeywardena used the rhythmic pattern of the Bossa nova for 'Piyaneni'.

In the 1960s Clarence Wijewardena was mentored by the pioneer Radio Ceylon broadcaster, Vernon Corea who helped him to reach the pinnacle of fame in the music world in Sri Lanka. Vernon Corea also played the music of Clarence Wijewardena, Annesley Malewana and the Moonstones not only on his radio programmes on Radio Ceylon but also on his popular programme 'London Sounds Eastern', on BBC Radio London in the late 1970s. He was invited by Clarence to write on a 1970s Lotus LP sleeve. Vernon Corea wrote: "We have all shared the treat of your lovely Lyrics, your tuneful compositions, your friendly presentation and your spontaneous sense of sharing with your followers, your treasury of talent. Keep going, keep growing, keep glowing".

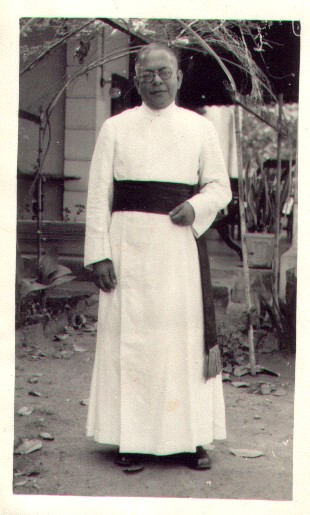
Piyaneni was a tribute in song composed by Clarence Wijewardena in memory of Reverend Canon Ivan Corea, a priest who had championed the rights of the poor in Sri Lanka

In the early 1970s Clarence Wijewardena composed 'Piyaneni' as a tribute to Reverend Canon Ivan Corea, the father of Radio Ceylon/BBC broadcaster Vernon Corea and Ambassador Ernest Corea. Reverend Ivan Corea was a much loved priest who worked for the poor on the island. He had helped the poorest of the poor - the Rodiya Community in Sri Lanka.

Clarence Wijewardena had visited Vernon Corea's residence in Maha Nuge Gardens in Colombo in the 1960s and met Reverend Corea prior to his death in 1968.

'Piyaneni' went on to become a hit in South Asia. Wijewardena's partner Annesley Malewana who was a member of the 'Moonstones' and the 'Super Golden Chimes' has sung 'Piyaneni' across the world including London, Melbourne and Los Angeles.

Listen to a clip of the hit song 'Piyaneni' here:

- Annesley Malewana sings the Clarence Wijewardena tribute to Reverend Ivan Corea

Watch the film 'Piyaneni' on the goonewj channel on YouTube:

- Piyaneni(A Tribute to Rev. Canon Ivan Corea) Annesley Malewana - YouTube

== See also ==
- Radio Ceylon
- Sri Lanka Broadcasting Corporation
- Ivan Corea
- Clarence Wijewardena
- Annesley Malewana
- Vernon Corea
