= Edirimanne Corea Family Union =

- Current region: Sri Lanka
- Members: Dominicus Corea, Charles Edgar Corea, Victor Corea, James Alfred Ernest Corea, Gate Mudaliyar James Edward Corea, Srikuradas Charles Shirley Corea, Claude Corea, Gamani Corea, J.C.A. Corea, Ivan Corea, Charles Alfred Ernest Corea, Vernon Corea, Ernest Corea, Vijaya Corea, Dylan Corea

The Edirimanne Corea Family Union (ECFU) is a group set up to 'foster interaction' among the members of the powerful Corea family in the island of Sri Lanka. The Corea family is one of the leading families of Sri Lanka. They trace their ancestry to Dominicus Corea also known as Edirille Rala who was crowned King of Kotte and Sitawaka in Sri Lanka - Dominicus Corea was born in Colombo in 1565.

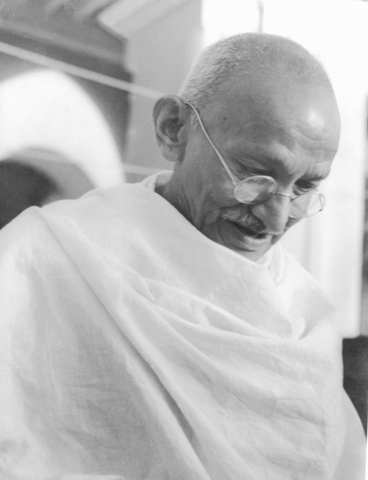
Mahatma Gandhi visited the Corea Family in Chilaw in 1927 and stayed with them in a Corea home called 'Sigiriya.'

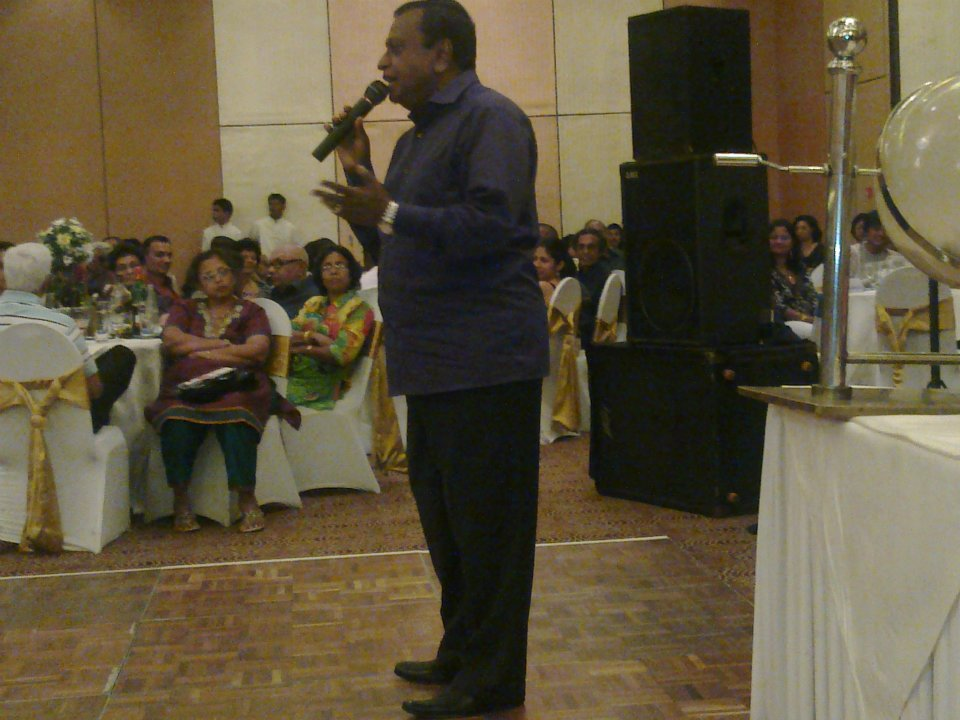
Sri Lankan music Superstar, Annesley Malewana, talks about the Corea Family at the Edirimanne Corea Family Union Sing-A-Long charity event held in the Grand Ballroom of the Galadari Hotel in Colombo, Sri Lanka in November 2011.

== Edirille Rala, King Dominicus Corea of Sri Lanka ==
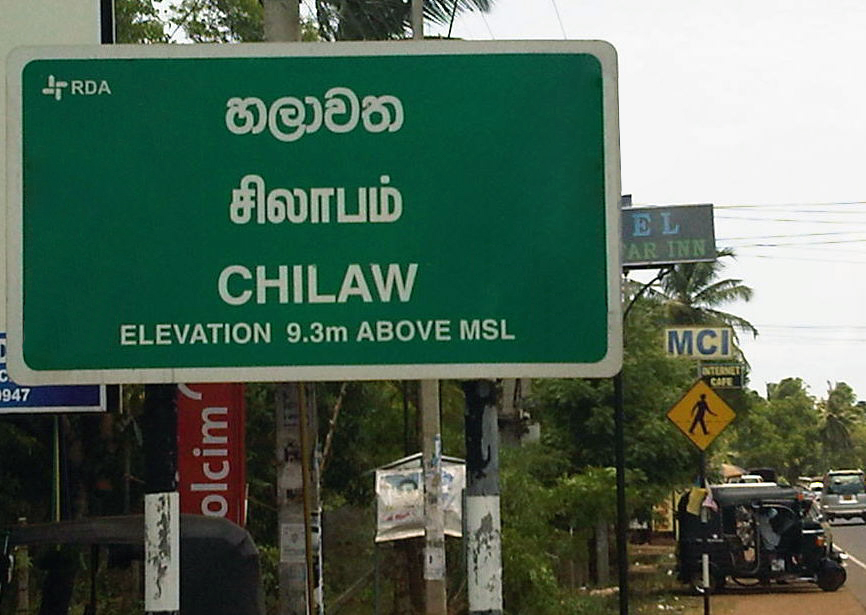
The Corea family hail from the west coast town of Chilaw in Sri Lanka. The wider family have played a key role in this town. Both Shirley Corea and Harindra Corea have represented the people of Chilaw in the Parliament of Sri Lanka.

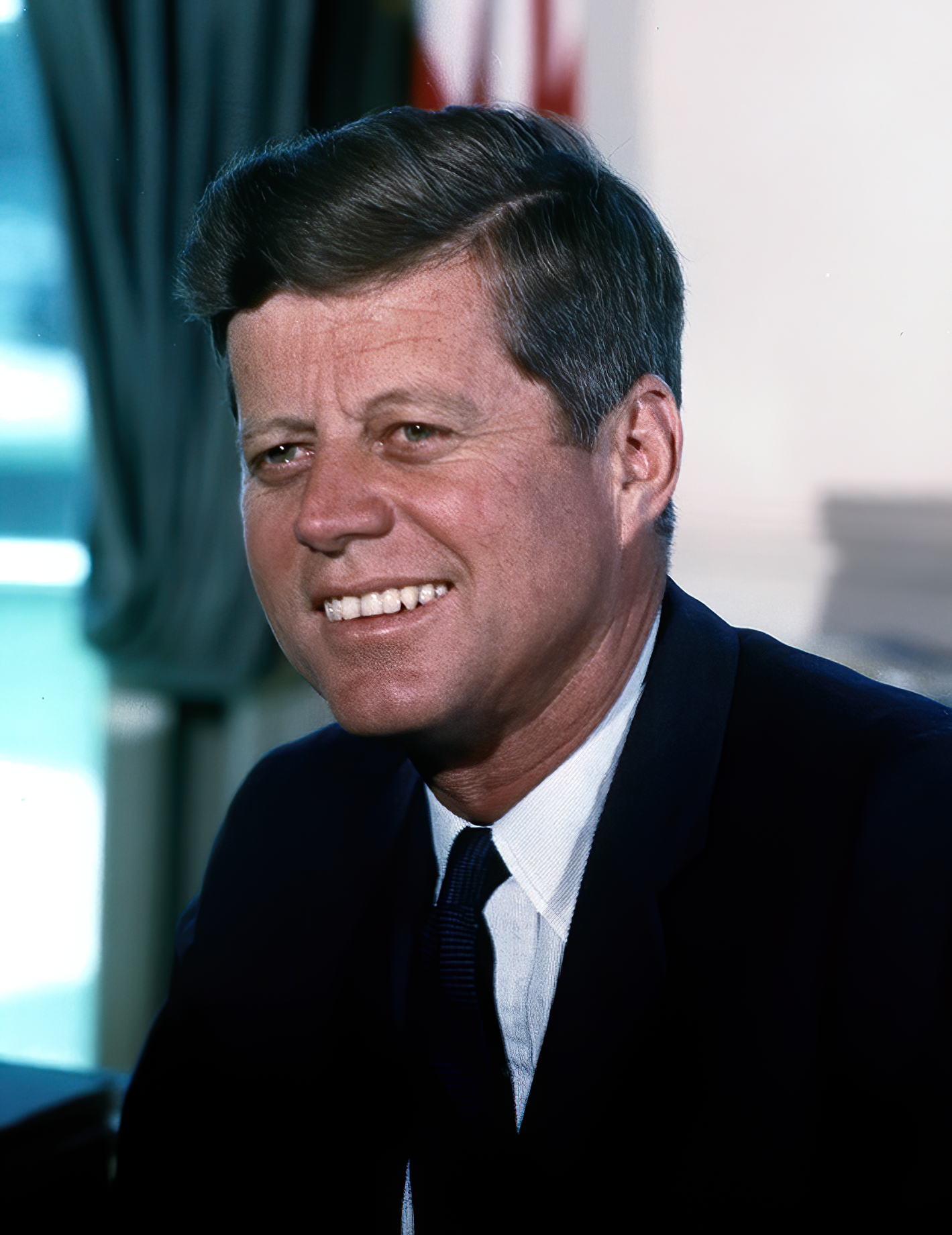
John F. Kennedy who was a United States Senator in 1960 visited Sir Claude Corea, President of the United Nations Security Council in his apartment in New York City, during the U.S. presidential race.

Dominicus Corea, the warrior king, rebelled against the colonial Portuguese forces and waged war against them. He was eventually captured by the Portuguese and executed on July 14, 1596, at the age of 31 in Colombo. "Such was the sad end of Domingos Corea, Edirimana Suriya Bandara, the greatest Sinhalese of his day," said Sri Lankan historian John M. Seneviratna. 'Great Warriors like Mayadunne, Veediya Bandara, Seethawaka Rajasinghe, Vimaladharmasuriya I, Senarath, Rajasinghe II, Nikapitiye Bandara and Edirille Rala who fought the Portuguese to preserve our territorial integrity and kept the Portuguese at bay despite all odds,' wrote Janaka Perera in the Asian Tribune.

== The Corea Family from Chilaw ==
Kumari Jayawardena, the Sri Lankan author, writing about the Coreas observed: 'Unconnected to the liquor trade but making their money on plantation ventures was the Corea Family of Chilaw, an influential govigama group with a history going back to Portuguese rule when they were warriors to Sinhala kings. During Dutch and British rule, members of the family were officials serving the state in various ways and rewarded with titles. Some members of the family took to the legal and medical professions, most notably the sons of Charles Edward Corea (a solicitor), who were active in local politics and in the Chilaw Association which campaigned against British land policies - especially the Waste Lands Ordinance, and for political reforms. The most active of Corea's sons was C.E. (Charles Edgar) who spoke up for peasant rights and was militant in his stand against the government. He was President of the Ceylon National Congress in 1924. C.E. Corea's brother, Alfred Ernest, was a doctor and the youngest Victor Corea was a lawyer who achieved fame for leading a campaign (and going to jail) in 1922 to protest the Poll Tax on all males; he was the first President of the Ceylon Labour Union led by A.E. Goonesinha and was active in the Ceylon Labour Party. While being professionals and political activists, the Coreas were also important landowners. '

The ECFU group according to the Daily News of Sri Lanka was set up in the 1970s. The Corea family that hails from Chilaw and has produced freedom fighters, members of the Legislative Council, State Council, House of Representatives, the diplomatic corps, broadcasting and print media and professionals in many fields, are knit together by an active family union.

Various buildings in Chilaw have been named after Srikuradas Charles Shirley Corea and Harindra Corea who represented the town as members of parliament. Charles Edgar Corea and Victor Corea tirelessly campaigned for the freedom of Sri Lanka - from British rule. They founded the Chilaw Association and were founder members of the Ceylon National Congress.

They were also elected members of the Legislative Council of Ceylon. Mahatma Gandhi recognising the contribution made by the Coreas to the independence movement in Ceylon, visited Chilaw and stayed with the Corea Family in a house called 'Sigiriya' during his only visit to the island in 1927.

A recent Annual General Meeting of the Edirimanne Corea Family Union and Members' Day-Out was held at the Leisure Lounge of the 'Ambalama' in Hanwella and the old and the young took their chance to meet, greet, unwind, relax and carry home memories of the warmth and intimacy of a family legacy. Singing, dancing and games replete with prizes and surprises filled the air. Nearly one-hundred members of the Corea family met to elect the following Office Bearers for 2010/2011 :

Patron: Dr Vijaya Corea; President: Dr Eugene Corea; Vice Presidents: Nirmali Jayasekera and Surangani Ameresekere; Secretary: Neville S. Weerasekera; Asst Secretary: Patsy Abeyasekera; Treasurer: Suvendreni Y. Weerasekera; Assistant Treasurer: Ranmal Goonetillake; Committee: Gerry de Alwis, Christabelle Aturupane, Priya Samarasinghe, Dukshi Goonetillake, Lilani Corea Dharmaratne, Shiranee Gunawardene, Amal Jayasekera, Wimal Perera; Entertainment Sub-Committee: Gamini de Silva, Shanika Peiris and Nihal Corea.

== Quotes about the Edirimane Corea Family Union ==
'The Corea Family Union was formed with the descendants of Dominicus Corea, alias Edirille Rala who had rendered an immortal service to protect the country from Portuguese invasion. It is notable to write that the Corea Union is open to all the descendants of Dominicus Corea.' - Dr. Mirando Obeysekere, Daily News, Sri Lanka.

== See also ==
- Dominicus Corea
- Charles Edgar Corea
- Victor Corea
- James Alfred Ernest Corea
- Gate Mudaliyar James Edward Corea
- Gamani Corea
- Claude Corea
- Ivan Corea
- Vernon Corea
- Ernest Corea
- Vijaya Corea
- J.C.A. Corea
- Mahatma Gandhi's visit to Chilaw, Sri Lanka
- List of political families in Sri Lanka

== Bibliography ==
- Great Sinhalese Men and Women of History - Edirille Bandara (Domingos Corea) By John M. Senviratna, 1938
- Twentieth Century Impressions of Ceylon: Its History, People, Commerce, Industries and Resources By A.W. Wright, Asian Educational Services, India; New Ed edition (15 December 2007)
- Ceylon and the Portuguese, 1505-1658 By P.E. Peiris (1920)
- The Fall of a Warrior - Edirille Bandara By Sarath Kumarawardane (2006)
