= James Corea =

James Corea may refer to:

- James Edward Corea (1865–1955), Ceylonese colonial-era headman
- James Alfred Corea (1871–1915), Ceylonese colonial-era headman
- James A. Corea (1938–2001), radio personality and specialist in nutrition
- James Alfred Ernest Corea, Sri Lankan public official
- J. C. A. Corea (James Clifford Aelian Corea), Sri Lankan educationist
