= Indrani Perera =

Sri Lankan singer

Indrani Perera ඉන්ද්‍රානි පෙරේරා
- Born: 15 February 1953 (age 73); Borella, Sri Lanka
- Education: Presbyterian School
- Occupation: Singer
- Spouse: James Sri Nivasan (m. 1979)
- Children: 2
- Parents: Abeypala Perera (father); Muriel Perera (mother)
- Musical career
- Genres: Pop; soul; rhythm and blues; Indian classical music
- Instrument: Vocals
- Years active: 1969–present
- Labels: Tharanga; Torana; Sooriya; Phillips

Indrani Perera (Sinhala:ඉන්ද්‍රානි පෙරේරා: born 15 February 1953), is a Sri Lankan singer and playback singer. Indrani along with Clarence Wijewardena and Annesley Malewana are known as "The Original Sinhala Pop Trio".

== Early life ==
She was born on 15 February in Borella, and is the second of three girls in the family. Her father, Abeypala Perera was a Buddhist and mother, Muriel Perera was a Christian. She has one elder sister, Mallika and one younger sister, Iranganie. Indrani studied at Presbyterian Girls School in Regent Street. She studied Kandyan Dancing in the school. Her sister Mallika has been singing since 1965 where she was the playback singer for the film Sama.

She is married to James Sri Nivasan in 1979. She met him during the production of his song Ha Ha Hore Danuna, where he was the Lotus Disc producer. The couple has one daughter, Anjalie Charukeshi and one son, Pastor Nimendra Dhananjaya. Nimendra is married to Roshani. He went to St. Thomas' Preparatory School, Kollupitiya. After that he studied A/L at the Royal Institute. Later in 2009, Nimendra obtained a degree in Business Studies.

== Career ==
From a young age she preferred going to church all dressed up to sing hymns. She started her singing career with the Fire Flies band of Dalrene Suby. In 1969, Indrani sang her first song Dilhani Duwani, which was previously voiced by Annesley Malewana. Then she was invited to join the popular musical band The Moonstones led by Clarence Wijewardena and Malewana. In December 1969, she along with Iranganie and Mallika and formed the female vocal group "Three Sisters". On 31 December 1969, she made her first appearance at a dance show at the Hotel Taprobane with The Moonstones. The Three Sisters sang together in concerts until Mallika died in 1980. After the death of elder sister, younger sister Iranganie and Indrani sang as a duo, but later Iranganie moved away from singing.

Indrani has sung several popular hits including, Thiline Lesin, Wasanthaye Mal Kekulai, Sudu Asu Pita Nagala, Kageda Gon Wassa, Kumudu Mal and Mathakaya Asurin. In 1973, she sung many songs with The Moonstones such as Sigiriya and Ha Ha Hore. Apart from that, she also worked as a playback singer in many films such as Podi Malli, Dinum Kanuwa, Lassana Kella, Sadahatama Oba Mage and Sikuruliya. In 1970s, she recorded Baila duets with Desmond de Silva and Paul Fernando.

In 2014, Indrani won the Soul Sounds Award for her contribution to the music industry. Then in 2015, she won an award from the National Catholic Literary Association and in 2016 by the Provincial Literary Association. In 2019, The Janabhimani or Hela Maha Rawana Rajabhimani Awards Ceremony was held at the Jasmine Auditorium at the BMICH where Indrani won the Best Service Award.

== In popular culture ==
Perera is portrayed by Dinakshie Priyasad in Theja Iddamalgoda's 2025 film Rhythm of the Guitar: Clarence.
