= The Moonstones =

Sri Lankan band

- Origin: Ratnapura, Sri Lanka
- Genres: Sri Lankan music
- Years active: 1966–1970
- Members: Clarence Wijewardena; Annesley Malawana; Indrani Perera

The Moonstones was an influential Sri Lankan band, led by Clarence Wijewardene and Annesley Malewana. It also included Mangala Rodrigo on lead guitar and Sunil Malawana on bass guitar. Originating in Ratnapura, the group was one of the most popular Sri Lankan bands during the 1960s.

== History ==
=== Formation ===
Clarence Wijewardena formed the group in 1966 after finding a fitting lead vocalist in friend Annesley Malawana. His earlier choice for the position, another friend, had failed to please his manager Sri Sangabo Corea. Corea named the group "The Moonstones" after the leading export of the group's hometown and for how talented he considered the band.

=== Success and dissolution ===
With a lineup set, the Moonstone(s) began to dominate Sinhala popular music with hits like "'Mango Nenda", "Kalu Mama", "Ruwan Puraya", and "Gonwassa" among others. Indrani Perera joined in 1968, and sang on several of the group's subsequent hits like "Dilhani." Wijewardene left in 1970. Annesley continued the group with Mike Gunesekera and had a hit single with "Dunhinda Manamali." The band eventually broke up; Malawana and Wijewardene reunited in a similar group, Super Golden Chimes.
