= Clarence Wijewardena =

Sri Lankan singer and musician (1943–1996)

Clarence Wijewardena ක්ලැරන්ස් විජේවර්ධන
- A promotional photo of Clarence from 1990s
- Born: Vithana Kuruppu Arachchilage Clarence Arthur Somasinghe Wijewardena; 3 August 1943; Brampton Estate Haputale, British Ceylon (now Sri Lanka)
- Died: 13 December 1996 (aged 53); Colombo, Sri Lanka
- Resting place: Borella Cemetery
- Education: Weeraparakrama College Yatawatta; Highland College Hatton
- Occupations: Singer-songwriter, guitarist, record producer, music director
- Years active: 1965–1996
- Spouse: Sheela Ramadasa
- Children: 1
- Musical career
- Genres: Pop; Playback singing; Sri Lankan music; Soft Rock
- Instruments: Vocals; Electric guitar
- Labels: Sooriya; Lotus; Sarasavi; Supertone; Victory; Singha; Tharanga; Singlanka; Torana

Vithana Kuruppu Arachchilage Clarence Arthur Somasinghe Wijewardena JP (Sinhala: ක්ලැරන්ස් විජේවර්ධන, Tamil: கிளாரன்ஸ் விஜேவர்தன; 3 August 1943 – 13 December 1996), known professionally as Clarence Wijewardena, was a Sri Lankan singer, composer and musician. Considered one of the most respected musicians in Sri Lanka, Wijewardena revolutionized Sri Lankan Sinhala Pop Music with the use of the electric guitar in Sinhala music, in the 1960s. Due to his influence on Sinhala pop music, he is often named as the "father of Sri Lankan pop music".

== Personal life ==
Clarence Wijewardena was born on 3 August 1943, in Haputale, Sri Lanka, to an estate medical practitioner. His family moved to Batugedara, Ratnapura, and Clarence abandoned a budding career as a planter to pursue music full-time. He completed education from Weeraparakrama College, Yatawatta and Hatton Highland College.

He married Sheela Ramadasa and they had one daughter, Amila Priyadarshani.

Wijewardena died on 13 December 1996, at the age of 53, in Sri Lanka after a long struggle against ruptured gastric ulcers and gangrene due to acute diabetes.

== Career in musical bands ==
=== Moonstones ===
Wijewardena formed the Moonstones at the age of 21 with Annesley Malewana as lead vocalist. Managed by an advertising icon, Sri Sangabo Corea, the group recorded several songs, which aired on the Saturday Star program in 1966.

The young musicians were mentored by Sri Sangabo Corea, together with veteran Radio Ceylon/SLBC broadcaster Vernon Corea. Vijaya Corea, provided radio exposure that helped introduce their music to a wider audience.

Clarence recorded songs for each of their immediate family members in gratitude.

Their 1968 debut EP "Mango Nanda" was released on the JVPC007 Philips label selling up to 5,000 copies. It included the songs Mango Nanda, Ruwan Puraya, Seetha Ude and Menike. Their second release "More Hits by the Moonstones" came out in November that year, on the Sooriya label and included the hits Kalu Mama, Rosa Male, Ramani and Goyam Kapanawa. Later the song Mango Nanda was selected the best Sinhala song by the Hit Parade program on Radio Ceylon as well. In 1969, the Moonstones welcomed female vocalist Indrani Perera who sang lead on the best selling hit Dilhani. Wijewardena himself only sang lead on Dileepa Podi Puthu an adaptation of a poem written by Karunaratne Abeysekera to his son.

During the 'Moonstones' era, Wijewardena, who performed as a composer and music director, became a singer. Wijewardena took the initiative to start a three-member band, he was a self taught guitarist. However, later the 'Moonstones' were formed with Annesley playing the key role as lead singer. After he left the Moonstones in 1970, he held a musical show in Moratuwa with Chanaka Perera and Wijith Peiris and the show was named as "Breakaways from the Moonstones". The late Mike Goonesekera took over the reins of the Moonstones after the departure of Clarence.

=== Golden Chimes ===
Wijewardena departed the Moonstones and formed a new music group called the Golden Chimes, with ex-Moonstones bassist Chanaka Perera and Lankika Perera in January 1971. Their first release included Kimade Nawe, Mage Pelpathe, Sihin Sinawai and Samanalayo. Subsequently, the vocalist Anil Bharathi joined with Golden Chimes. The second EP on Philips label contained Malai Velai, Sihil Nuwan, Surangana Vesvala and Mage Viyowen and third EP contained Iru Dina, Sandai Tharui, Muhudu Rella and Thakkita Tharikita. At this time Wijewardena found a professional lead guitarist Dixon Gunaratne at a wedding.

After evaluating Bharati's performance for one year, Wijewardena decided to enter him into the Sinhala pop music scene. Wijewardena composed Ada Wei Iru Dina for Bharati which became an all-time hit followed by the lovely Christmas song Bethlehempure and Maa Adarai Nangiye. Clarence offered him another all-time hit Tikirimalee with Ma Mulin Liyu Pem Pathe, Desa Vidala, Bambaraku Aduna, Sarojini and Iru Dina Pamanak.

=== The Super Golden Chimes ===
The Super Golden Chimes.

In 1972, Wijewardena and Gunaratne left the Golden Chimes and they both formed a new band known as Super Golden Chimes also with the support of Annesley in 1973. Wijewardena formed the "Super Golden Chimes" back in the company of his lifelong friend Annesley. It was one of the most productive music groups in Sri Lanka and together they hit the number one slot in the Sri Lankan music charts on both the Sinhala and English Services of Radio Ceylon and subsequently the Sri Lanka Broadcasting Corporation. For many years they enjoyed the reputation as Sri Lanka's number one group in the 1970s and 1980s. After three years Wijewardena decided to go solo when Annesley announced his plans for marriage.

== Experiments in music ==
Wijewardena experimented with sitar music and introduced the sitar to some of the songs of the 'Moonstones. For the first time in Sri Lanka, he used a guitar wah wah pedal for the song Pemkathwawa for a recording. Also the song Sigiriya was the first Bossa nova beat song in Sri Lanka and later he used this beat for the songs Piyaneni, Mage Palpathe, Muhudu Rella, Renin Piyabanna, Maliniye, Ramya, Ran Monarun (Winslow Six), Lalitha Kala (Chithra Somapala). Also he used two guitar players to play lead parts and counterparts of songs such as Sumudu Mal Pipinu and Dileepa Podi Puthu. For the first time in Sri Lanka he used the blocked guitar tone for the song Kusumalatha. Wijewardena introduced some of the guitar techniques through his songs via a single guitar harmony style in the introduction of "Dileepa Podi Puthu" and arpeggio styles in "Sihina Lowak" and "Malata Bambareku Se".

Wijewardena composed a song Ma Langin that was in the 1960s "Twist" style and released the song in Yugayen Yugayata cassette in 1989. For the song Dineka Me Nadee Theere, he used mute guitar technique for the introduction.

== Music direction ==
=== Sinhala cinema ===
He entered the Sinhala film music industry with the 1975 blockbuster Sikuruliya directed by H. D. Premaratne. The sound track was supplied by the Golden Chimes – the film includes a scene where Wijewardena and the Golden Chimes perform at a party. For the film, he also used western musical instruments as well as eastern musical instruments. The song Wasanthaye Mal Kekulay sung by Indrani Perera was composed by him was the first song that consists of five lines in the chorus part of the song. He also composed music for the 1978 film Apeksha directed by Premaratne.

Clarence with 3 Sisters.

=== Television ===
Wijewardena directed music for the two popular television serial Susima and Nidikumba Mal. He was the composer and the music director for all the six songs of Susima teledrama, including Desa Piyagath Kala sung by Jackson Anthony and George Senanayake. During this time he got the opportunity to compose and direct music for maestro W. D. Amaradeva for the song Sasara Gewa Yana which contained in serial Nidikumba Mal directed by Sydney Chandrasekara. He also composed and music directed the song Daesawan Dase which says about child abuse and other prohibited things happen in present society. The song was contained in the "Sihiwatana II" cassette. When the Royal Tusker of the Temple of Tooth Relic Raja died, he composed and music directed a song about the royal tusker and it was named as Kandu Sikarin Wata Senkadagala Pura. It was vocalized by the Ananda Perera who was the leader of the Siha Shakthi music band.

=== Tribute songs and jingles ===
Wijewardena has composed and directed music for a number of songs for the daughters and sons of his friends and relatives. He composed Piyaneni in memory of the late Reverend Canon Ivan Corea who was the father of Radio Ceylon broadcaster, Vernon Corea. He had met Corea in Maha Nuge Gardens in the 1960s during his visits to meet with Vernon Corea. The song became an instant hit in South Asia and to this day it is sung by Annesley on his world tours.

Stone memorial (Tomb) of Clarence Wijewardena at Kanatte Cemetery.

Wijewardena composed a song for the son of Vijaya Corea and it was titled as Viran Bilindhu Puthe. After that Wijewardena changed the chorus part of the song and sang that song as Kiri Muhuda Kalabala. He also composed a song for the son of Chanaka and Lankika Perera and it was titled as Sihina Pathum Wimane. He also composed the song Naththal Seeya in the early 1970s. His first solo is Dileepa Podi Puthu was written by Radio Ceylon broadcaster, Karunaratne Abeysekera for his own son. In the early 1980's, he composed Sashika Duwani for the daughter of Vijaya Corea. He also filmed a music video for the song.

Wijewardena joined Sing Lanka Ltd. and acted as the General Manager. Sing Lanka recording studio was the first recording studio in Sri Lanka with multi tracks and Wijewardena was the pioneer to introduce this recording studio. During that time he directed music for a number of artists in Sri Lanka. He also produced a cassette tape named "Clarence with the Rising Stars".

Wijewardena showed his outstanding music skills during this time. He composed and directed music a song named as Maha Balwathune for the conference of the Non-Aligned Movement held in 1975 in Sri Lanka. He composed and directed music a song for the SAARC Conference as well. At the same time he sang the song Duwani Sirima when Hon. Former Prime Minister Mrs Sirimavo Bandaranaike arrived as the chief guest for the opening ceremony of Ceramic Corporation. Also Super Golden Chimes supplied music for that opening ceremony. He certificated as the most popular composer in Sri Lanka for the years 1974 and 1976 by a pop poll conducted by Pop and Teen Fanfare. The song Kataragama was composed by himself also certificated as the best song in Sri Lanka for the year 1974 by a pop poll conducted by Pop and Teen Fanfare.

In the early 1970s, Wijewardena invited Vernon Corea who had mentored him from the start to write the notes on a Lotus LP sleeve. Vernon Corea wrote: "We have all shared the treat of your lovely Lyrics, your tuneful compositions, your friendly presentation and your spontaneous sense of sharing with your followers, your treasury of talent. Keep going, keep growing, keep glowing". In 1976, when Vernon Corea was invited to present the first Asian radio programme in English on BBC Radio London called 'London Sounds Eastern' he played the music of Wijewardena and Annesley, introducing them to a whole new audience in London.

Super Golden Chimes LP.

Clarence in the early 1980s.

Wijewardena became famous for his melodious and catchy jingles aired over the Sri Lanka Broadcasting Corporation. These jingles were Elasto, Bata, Astra Margarine, Bristol Cigarettes, Arpico, Dot Toffee, Singer, Edna Chocolate, Thultex, Ice-Cream Soda, Development Lottery, Dasuna Cartoon Paper, Atlas pens, Orex pens, Building Materials Co-operation (in Sinhala and English), Keels and Health Joy Soap etc. The song "Sigiri Ru Ladun Paradai" which he composed for the beauty queen contest became an instant hit. He formed the Sri Lankan band "Madhara" in 1985 with Rookantha Gunathilake (keyboards), Mariazelle Goonetilleke (keyboards/female vocals), Raju Bandara (lead guitar), Keneth De Silva (bass guitar), Ajantha Dodampegama (drums) and rest of the other members of the group.

All of Wijewardena's compositions have been recorded at some of the island's best recording studios and under the best producing labels in Sri Lanka. Some of the early 1960s recordings were at Augie Ranaweera's studio in Bambalapitiya. Wijewardena organised three musical shows with Annesley and Indrani at BMICH in Colombo. Wijewardena proved to be quite a hit in London when broadcaster Vernon Corea broadcast his music on BBC Radio London 206 on his popular radio program, London Sounds Eastern. Wijewardena and Annesley frequently toured the United Kingdom in the 1980s playing to huge audiences in London.

== Beyond singing ==
When the Sri Lankan cricket team became a Test cricket nation in 1982, Wijewardena produced an album called Test Cricket Souvenir, commemorating the country achieving test cricket status. The song "Thana Nilla Dige" performed by Saman de Silva became a hit during the season of Test cricket and every big match in Colombo.

Wijewardena was concerned and made a statement to Sathsara, an art magazine in Sri Lanka regarding the song "Thana Nilla Dige" and how its singer Saman De Silva was not given due credit for the song and published a full-page article about the song in a newspaper around the time of the release of the song and cassette but did not mention the name of the composer.

Clarence with Vernon Perera, H.D.Premaratne & Hemasiri Helpita.

== Controversy ==
However, due to the popularity of his songs which has grown since his death, they have also become the subject of a lawsuit over illegally recorded renditions sampled by other Sri Lankan artists. In 2001, Wijewardena's widow Sheela filed suit against Rajiv Sebastian, hoping to recover a portion of the income earned through the use of her late husband's work. An action doomed to failure due to the non-availability of evidence on the part of the complainant. Since the lawsuit against Rajiv and Sarath Kothalawela, Sheela filed a wrongful lawsuit against Annesley Malawana and lost it with no recourse. To this date, she has been unable to establish her rightful claims as the legitimate or legal heir to his intellectual property.

== Legacy ==
Many of his songs are considered classics, and continue to enjoy ample airtime on Sri Lankan television and radio broadcasts and on some overseas radio stations. The songs such as Rasa Pirunu Katha, Geeyakin Kese, Eatha Ran Wiman Yowun Sihina Loke, etc. are very popular among present generation which again demonstrated his talent in composing music (also as a lyricist) for the future. Clarence also supported the drafting of the Code of Intellectual Property Act No. 52 of 1979 by offering his insights as an artist, advocating for musicians' rights in Sri Lanka.

On 21 March 2017, the concert "Unfogettable Melodies of Clarence Live in Concert" was held at 6.30 pm at the Nelum Pokuna Theater, Colombo.

== In popular culture ==
A biographical film based on the musical life of Clarence, titled Rhythm of the Guitar: Clarence played by Damith Wijayathunga, was released on 27 June 2025 which was directed by Theja Iddamalgoda.
