= J. C. A. Corea =

Sri Lankan educationist

James Clifford Aelian Corea
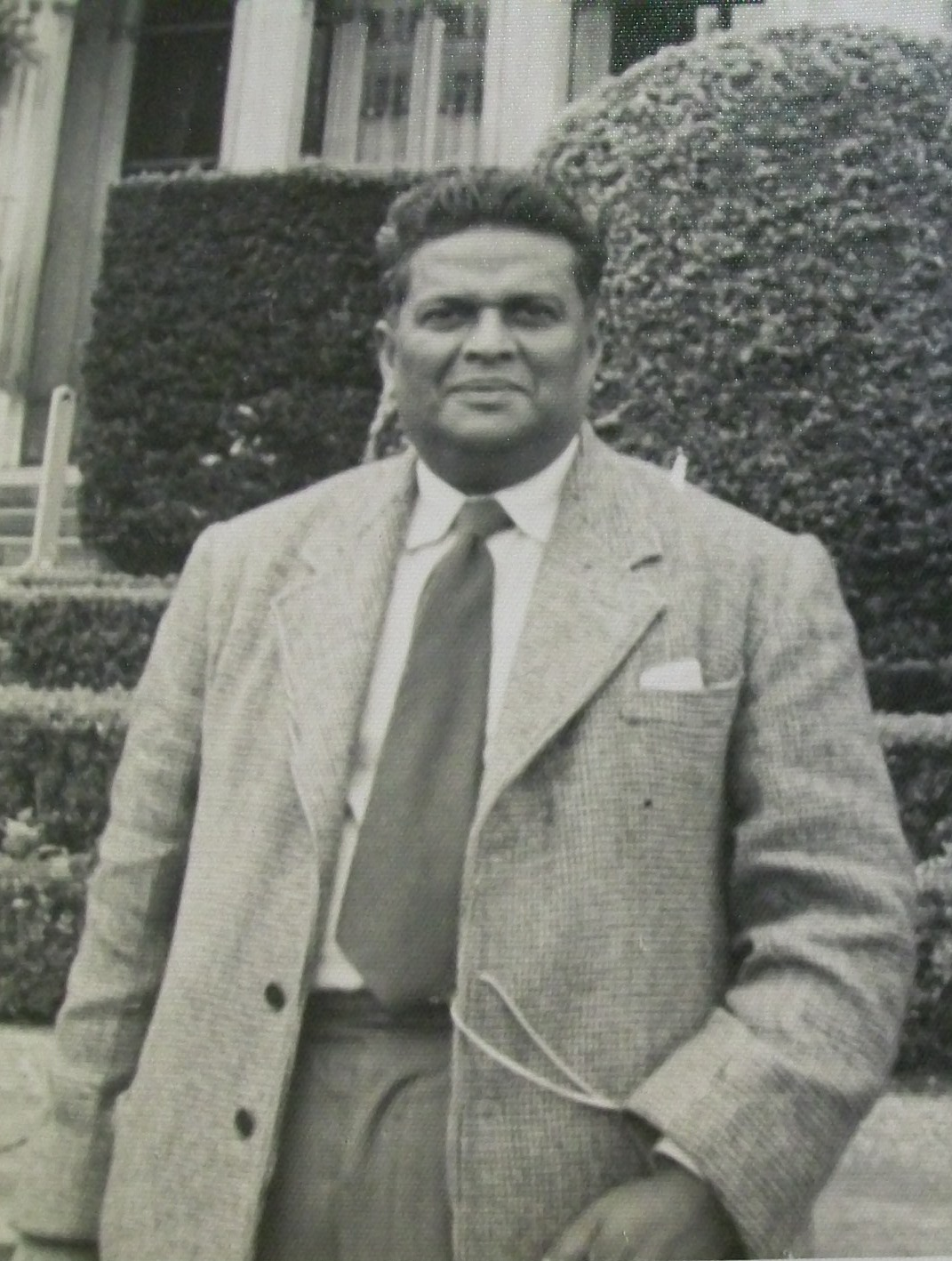
- The first Sri Lankan Principal of Royal College Colombo
- Born: 1904; Chilaw, Sri Lanka
- Died: 1988 (aged 83–84); North London, United Kingdom
- Education: Royal College, Colombo; Ceylon Medical College, Colombo; University of London; University of Cambridge
- Occupations: Educator and diplomat
- Parent(s): Gate Mudaliyar James Edward Corea and Frances Eleanor Terentia Ameresekera

James Clifford Aelian Corea was a Sri Lankan educationist. He was the former Principal of Royal College Colombo and a former master in Kingswood College, Kandy and Wesley College, Colombo.

== Early life ==
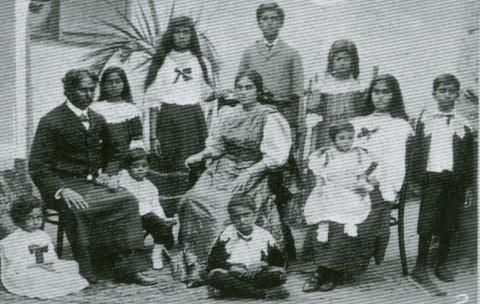
J. C. A. Corea is seated by the side of his father, Gate Mudaliyar James Edward Corea of Chilaw, surrounded by his brothers and sisters.

Born in the coastal town of Chilaw in Ceylon in 1904, he was raised by his parents, Gate Mudaliyar James Edward Corea and Frances Eleanor Terentia Ameresekera, in Chilaw. His father sent him to Colombo to be educated at Royal College. He then gained an MA in Psychology from the University of London and a Diploma in Education from the University of Cambridge.

== Educationist career ==
He became a master at Kingswood College, Kandy, and at Wesley College, Colombo. Corea was the President of All Ceylon Teachers' Union and in 1943 was appointed as Vice principal of his alma mater Royal College Colombo. In 1946 he succeeded Principal Bradby as the first Ceylonese Principal of Royal College Colombo in 1946 had held the post until 1953.

In 1946 he returned the school to its buildings at Reid Avenue after it had been taken over by the British Army during Second World War. During his tenure he had several infrastructure developments made and implemented the Free Education Scheme in 1947. He was also the first old Royalist (Royal Group of 1922) to become Principal of Royal College Colombo.

== Diplomatic career ==
After retirement he became the Warden of the Ceylon Students Centre in London and served as a senior diplomat when he was appointed Education Officer of the Ceylon High Commission in London. In 1983 the Old Royalists' Association in the United Kingdom was formed under his and Principal Bradby's patronage. His nephews were the Radio Ceylon broadcaster Vernon Corea and his brother Ernest Corea, who was Sri Lanka's Ambassador to the United States of America. Both were Old Royalists.

J. C. A. Corea was also the President of All Ceylon Teachers' Union. Then Vice principal of Royal College from 1943 to 1945. He succeeded as the Principal in January 1946 and held that position until June 1953. The J. C. A. Corea Trophy is awarded at the annual hockey encounter between Royal College Colombo and Trinity College, Kandy, in his memory.

== Death ==
J. C. A. Corea lived in Muswell Hill in North London in the United Kingdom for many years. He died in North London in 1988. His ashes were flown to Sri Lanka, accompanied by his nephew, Vernon Corea. The Prefects of Royal College Colombo lined the exit of the Bandaranaike International Airport at Katunayake, as a guard of honour, when his ashes were flown to Colombo, draped with the Royal College flag.

Old Royalists such as Junius Richard Jayewardene, President of Sri Lanka, Lalith Athulathmudali, a Sri Lankan government minister, and dignitaries, paid their respects at the Royal College Hall, Navarangahala. A memorial service was held at St. Paul's Church, Milagiriya.

== See also ==
- Gate Mudaliyar James Edward Corea
- Ivan Corea
- Vernon Corea
- Ernest Corea
- Edirimanne Corea Family Union
- Chilaw
- List of political families in Sri Lanka

== Bibliography ==
- Great Sinhalese Men and Women of History – Edirille Bandara (Domingos Corea), by John M. Senaveratna, (1937)
- One Hundred Years of Education in Ceylon, by J. C. A. Corea, Modern Asian Studies (1969), 3 : pp 151–175, Cambridge University Press (1969)
- Twentieth Century Impressions of Ceylon: Its History, People, Commerce, Industries and Resources, by A. W. Wright, Asian Educational Services, India; New Ed edition (15 Dec 2007)

== External links and sources ==
Official

- Royal College

Publications

- Royal College Magazine

Library

- Royal College Library

Alumni

- Royal College Union
