= Grace Paul =

Sri Lankan educator (1901–1972)

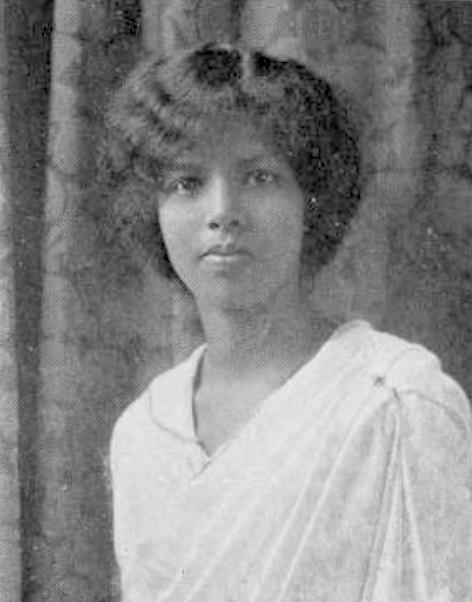
- Grace Paul, from the 1924 Mount Holyoke College yearbook
- Born: 1901; Jaffna
- Died: 1972 (aged 70–71)
- Occupation: Educator

Grace Jecks Paul (born 1901 – died after 1972) was a Tamil Christian educator from Sri Lanka. She was principal at three girls' schools in Sri Lanka, and a founding member of the Ceylon Federation of University Women in 1941.

== Early life ==
Paul was born in Jaffna, to Tamil Christian parents, Rev. Isaac Paul and Elizabeth Holsington Paul. Her grandfather, father, and uncles were pastors, connected with the American Ceylon Mission. She graduated from Uduvil Seminary and Madras Christian College before attending Mount Holyoke College in 1920. At Mount Holyoke, she was president of the Cosmopolitan Club. She graduated from Mount Holyoke in 1924, and pursued further studies at Teachers College, Columbia University.

While a student in the United States, she attended the 19th Conference of Women's Foreign Missionary Societies in 1922, in Massachusetts. In 1924, she spoke at the Fourth Congress of the Women's International League for Peace and Freedom in Washington.

== Career ==
Paul taught science at Uduvil Girls' School, and was eventually principal of the school's bilingual program. From 1947 to 1955, she was principal at Girls' High School, Kandy, the school's first Sri Lankan head. From 1958 to 1964, she was principal of St. Paul's Girls School, Milagiriya. She was known for requiring laboratory work in her classes.

In 1941 she was a founding member of the Ceylon Federation of University Women, along with Doreen Young Wickremasinghe, Hilda Kularatne, Susan George Pulimood, Marjorie Westrop, and Clara Motwani. She was the only native-born founder of the organization, and its first Sri Lankan president, leading the federation from 1944 to 1946 and from 1958 to 1959.

== Personal life ==
In 1932, she visited one of her brothers, clergyman and educator Charles Blackshear Paul, in Singapore and spoke on her experiences in the United States. She survived her brother Charles when he died in 1973.
