= Damith Wijayathunga =

Sri Lankan model and actor

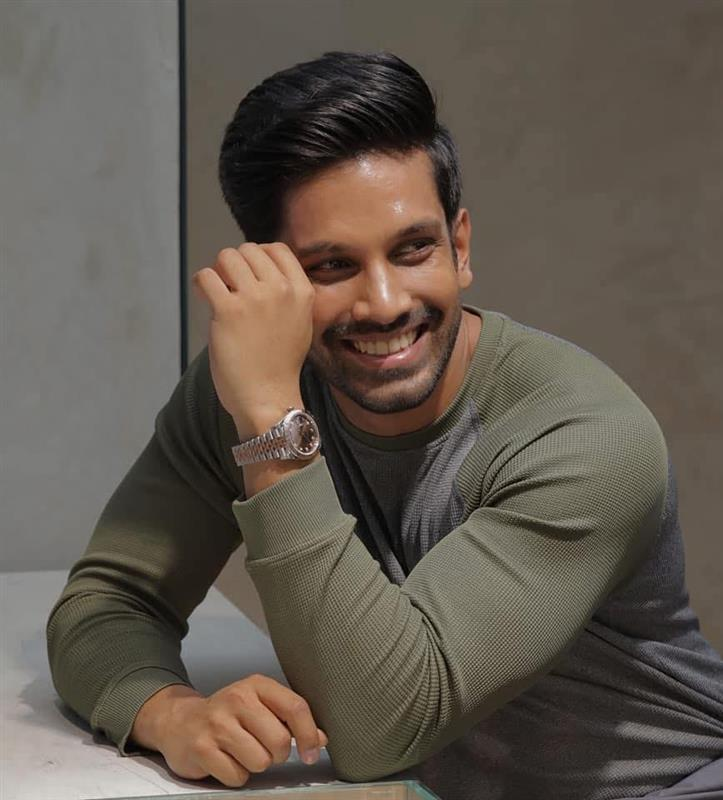
- Born: Damith Chandima Bandara Wijayathunga; 1991 (age 34–35); Matale, Sri Lanka
- Education: Vijaya College, Matale; St Thomas' College, Matale; Government Science College, Matale
- Occupations: Model, actor
- Years active: 2015–present

Damith Chandima Bandara Wijayathunga (born 1991 as දමිත් විජයතුංග), popularly known as Damith Wijayathunga, is an actor in Sri Lankan cinema and television and a professional model. He is the winner of Mister Sri Lanka in 2017.

== Personal life ==
Wijayathunga was born in 1991, in Ukuwela, Matale as the eldest of the family with three siblings. He has two younger brothers: Tharindu and Thilan. His father, Ananda Wijayathunga is a government officer and mother Shirani Weerakoon worked in the National Water Supply and Drainage Board. Damith started primary education from Vijaya College, Matale. After passing grade 5 scholarship, he attended St Thomas' College, Matale in 2002 for his secondary education until 2005 and then entered Government Science College, Matale for G.C.E O/L and completed A/Ls in 2010 in biology stream. During school times, he was excellent in cricket and athletics, specially in the 100–200 meters track events as well as oriental music and arts. After passing A/Ls, he graduated in Computer Science from National School of Business Management (NSBM) in 2016.

== Career ==
While studying for his degree, Damith started to act in several advertisements, where he got to know by Sameera Weerasinghe in 2015. Then he met Devinda Senanayake and asked him to participate in a commercial. Then he participated for many modeling exhibitions under the guidance of Sameera Weerasinghe, including Colombo Fashion Week where he met several leading models and cinematographers. In 2017, he contested and won the title of Mister Sri Lanka and then represented Sri Lanka for "Man of the World 2017" pageant held on July 18 in the Philippines.

In 2019, he started acting in the television serial Hadawathe Kathawa telecast by Swarnavahini. He was selected to the role "Ravindra" by Saranga Mendis. The show became highly popular. In 2020, he presented the music chart show telecast in ITN. Apart from that, he appeared in several television commercials and attended as a judge in modeling competitions across the country.

In 2025, Damith made his maiden cinema acting through the biographical musical film Clarence: Rhythm of the Guitar. He played the lead titular role of Clarence Wijewardena in the film along with newcomer Nihari Perera. The film received huge popularity among the public, where he appeared in several television programs and social media programs. His second cinema appearance came in the same year through the drama film Hello From The Other Side, where Damith played the role of a doctor. For the film, he won the award for the Best Actor at the 4th Ceylon International film festival, California, USA in October 2025.

== Filmography ==
Key
| † | Denotes films that have not yet been released |

| Year | Film | Role | Ref. |
|---|---|---|---|
| 2025 | Clarence: Rhythm of the Guitar | Clarence Wijewardena | |
| 2025 | Hello From The Other Side | Doctor Awantha | |
| TBA | Megha Warsha † | | |

== Awards ==
- Most Popular Actor - Sarasaviya Awards 2026
