= St. Paul's Girls School, Milagiriya =

St. Paul's Girls' School
- Milagiriya, Colombo; Sri Lanka

Information
- Type: National School
- Motto: Latin: Per Aspera ad Astra
- Established: 14 January 1887; 139 years ago
- Founder: St. Paul's Church of Milagiriya
- Staff: 250 academic staff
- Gender: Girls
- Age: 5 to 19
- Enrollment: 3,500
- Houses: Bhakti, Deepthi, Keerthi, Maithri, Pragathi, Shakthi
- Colours: Red and white
- Former pupils: Old Paulians

St. Paul's Girls' School is one of the oldest schools for girls, and is situated in Milagiriya, Colombo. The school was founded on 14 January 1887 as a Parish school affiliated to St. Paul's Church with 24 students and four teachers, with Stella Coban (1887 – 1892) as the first principal. In the early years of the school the majority of the students belonged to the Burger community and the medium of education was English. In 1957 the school provided education in Sinhala, Tamil and English mediums.

In February 1993 during the administration of principal, Gothami Fernando, the school was declared a National School. Today the school has more than 3,500 students with 250 academic staff and 55 non-academic staff.

== Principals ==
The following are principals from the time of foundation to the present:

- Stella Coban (1887-1922)
- Eda Ondatchi (1922-1937)
- Agnes Spittel (1937-1940)
- Honor Rover (1940-1947)
- Thelma Bud Jansz (1947-1955)
- E. P. Roper (1955-1958)
- Grace Paul (1958-1964)
- Pearl Ratnayake (1964-1967)
- Barbara Gunasekera (1967-1985)
- K. Pitigala (1985-1989)
- Hema Wellalage (1989-1990)
- Gothami Fernando (1990-1995)
- I. P. Alahakoon (1995-2004)
- Geetha Gunawardena (2004-2014)
- Sumedha Jayaweera (2015–2023)
- Chandi Siriwardene (2023 - 2024)
- Surekha Siriwardene (2024 - 2025)
- Nayomi Dassanayake ( 2025 to Present )
