= Ivan Corea =

Sri Lankan Anglican priest

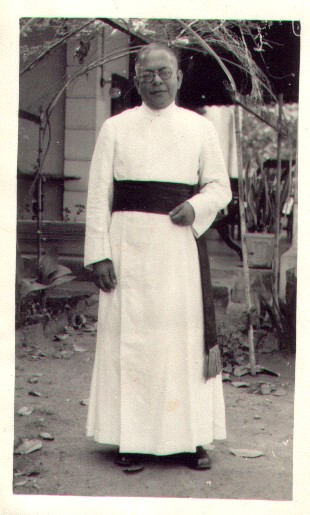
- Title: Rural Dean of Colombo, Examining Chaplain to the Bishop of Colombo

Personal life
- Born: 1902 Chilaw, Ceylon
- Died: 1968 (aged 65–66) Madampe, Ceylon

Religious life
- Religion: Christianity, Anglican Church of Ceylon
- Ordination: 1926

Senior posting
- Based in: Sri Lanka
- Post: Vicar of St. Luke's Church Borella (1929-1954), Vicar St. Paul's Church, Milagiriya (1954-1961)
- Period in office: 1950s-1960s
- Previous post: Curate, St. Phillip's Church, Kurana, Katunayake

Hector Vernon Ivan Seneviratne Corea (Sinhala: හෙක්ටර් වර්නන් අයිවන් සෙනෙවිරත්න කොරයා) was a priest of the Church of Ceylon.

== Early life ==
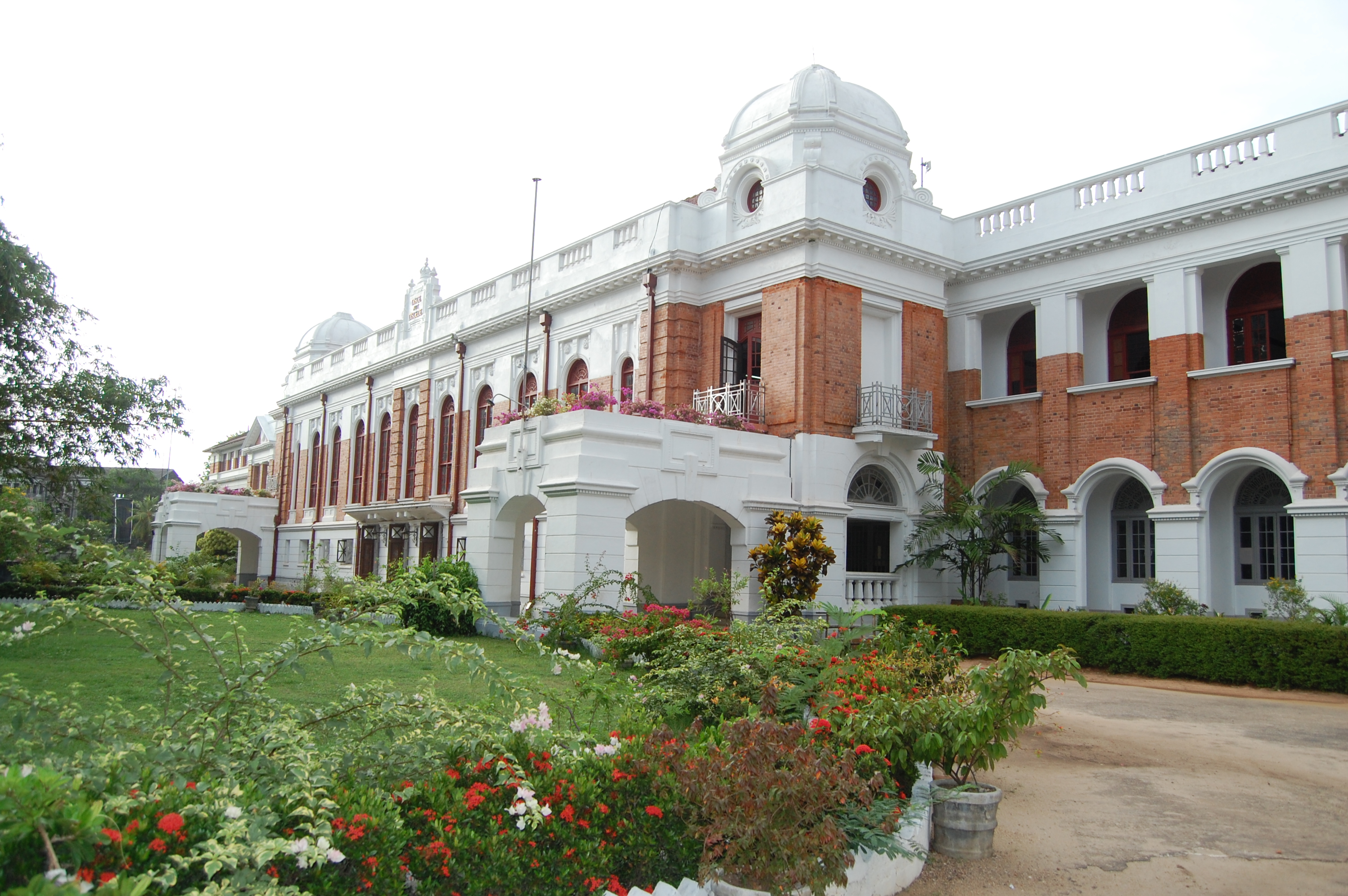
The Ivan Corea attended the Royal College, Colombo.

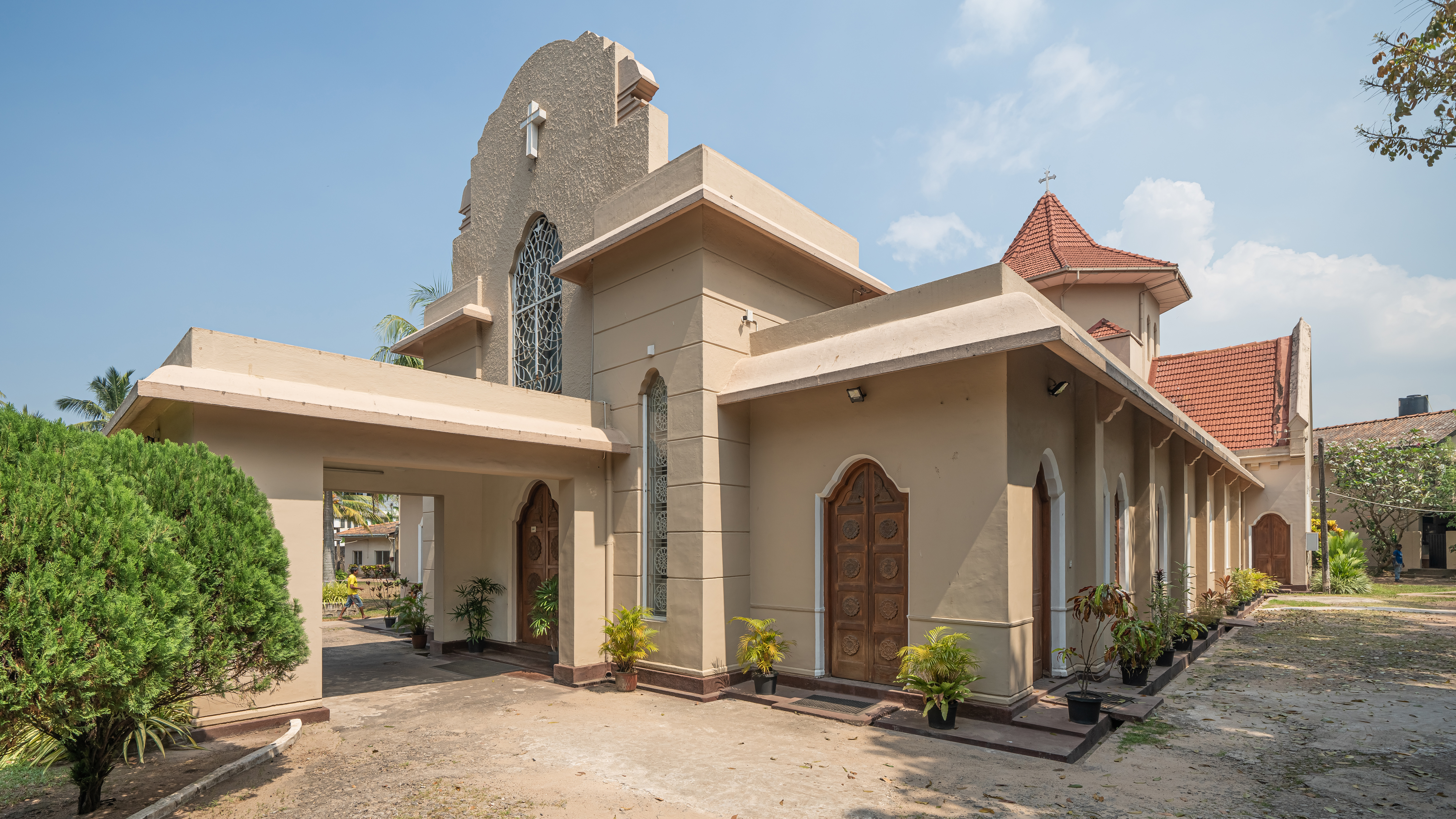
St. Luke's Church, Borella, Colombo, Sri Lanka, a typical Protestant, Anglican Church belonging to the Church of Ceylon – designed entirely by Corea

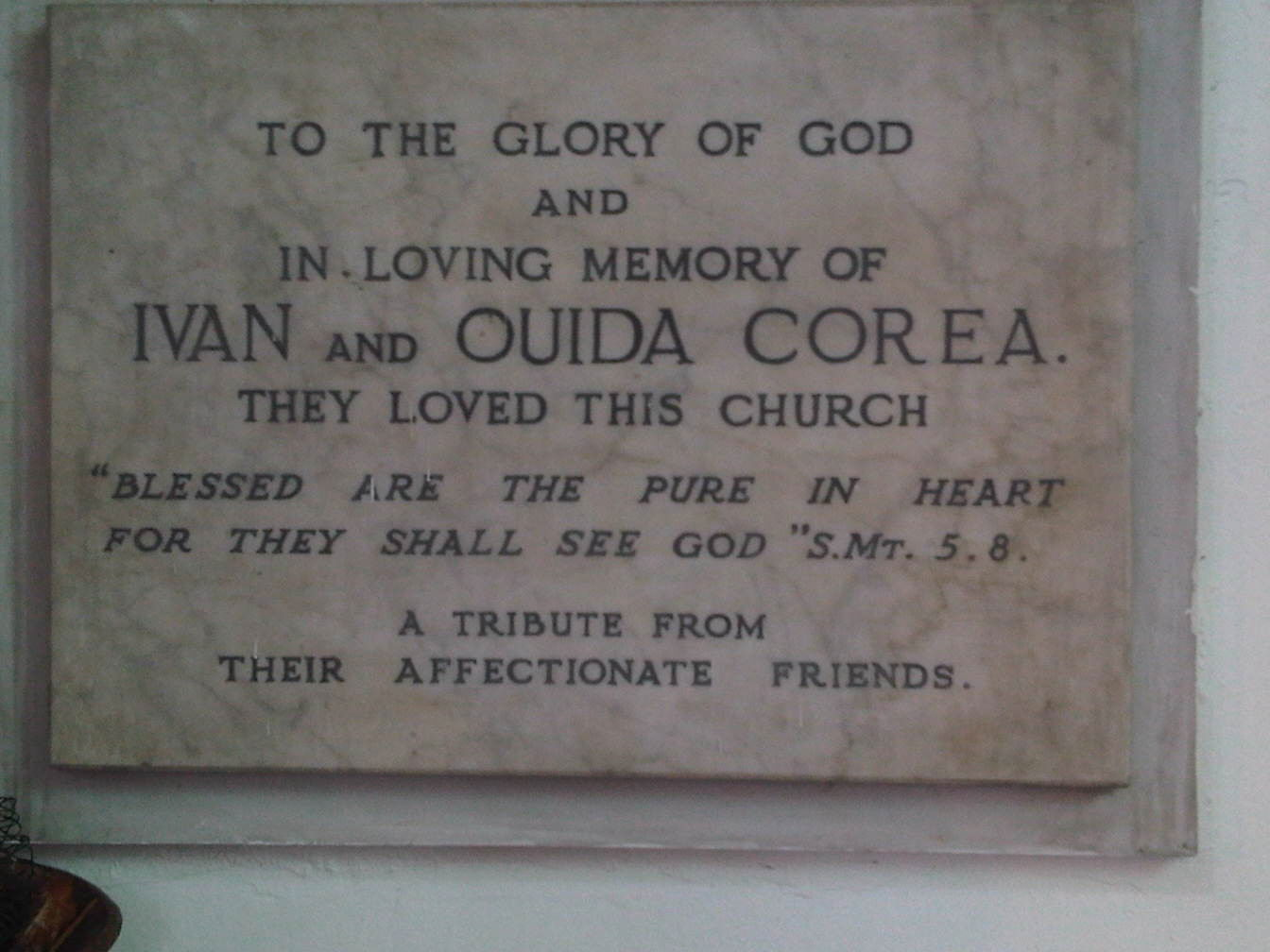
The plaque near the altar at St. Luke's Church remembering the work of Ivan Corea, the longest-serving vicar of the church and his wife Ouida Corea.

Ivan Corea was born in Chilaw, Ceylon, to James Alfred Ernest Corea and Letitia Grace Alice Seneviratne. His uncles were the freedom fighters Charles Edgar Corea and Victor Corea, who founded the Chilaw Association and the Ceylon National Congress. Ivan Corea was a direct descendant of King Dominicus Corea, (also known as Edirille Rala). He was crowned King of Kotte and Sitawaka by Vimala Dharma Suriya, King of Kandy, in 1596. Mahatma Gandhi met James Corea when he was hosted by the Corea family in Chilaw, on his first and only visit to Ceylon in 1927.

The young Corea was educated at Royal College Colombo. He joined the clergy of the Anglican Church of Ceylon in 1926. An early posting was at St. Phillip's Church in Kurana, Katunayake, followed by St Luke’s in Borella. Having spent several years in the priesthood, Corea was appointed Chaplain to the Bishop of Colombo. He was also made a Canon of the Cathedral Church of Christ in his sacerdotal silver jubilee. In the 1960s, Corea was appointed Rural Dean of Colombo.

== St. Luke's Church Borella ==
Corea was Vicar of St. Luke's Church Borella for 25 years (1929 - 1954). Corea and his wife Ouida Corea played a key role in re-building St. Luke's. The edifice was designed by Corea, including the designs on each pillar, the octagonal tower of the sanctuary, the doors and windows, and all decorative motifs within the church. The foundation stone for the extension was laid on 17 October 1938 by the Commissary of the Bishop of Colombo, F. L. Beven.

== The Easter Sunday Raid ==
St. Luke's Church was packed on Easter Sunday morning (5 April) 1942 when Admiral Chuichi Nagumo and the Japanese Imperial Navy attacked the city of Colombo, Ceylon, during World War II. Among the congregation attending the Easter Sunday service were British and Ceylonese military personnel.

The attack commenced around 7.30 a.m.; Corea was preaching at the time, when according to the parishioners of St. Luke's, the RAF Hawker Hurricanes swooped over the church to engage the Japanese Zero fighters in dogfights above the skies of Borella. The zero fighters and bombers were led by Captain Mitsuo Fuchida, who also led the attack on Pearl Harbor.

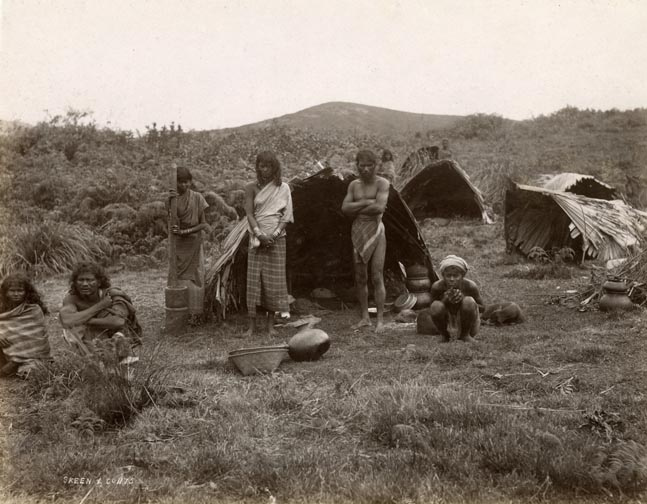
Ivan Corea and his wife Ouida Corea, reached out to the poorest sections of society in Sri Lanka - including the Rodiya Community. He housed the Rodi on church property in Borella, Colombo.

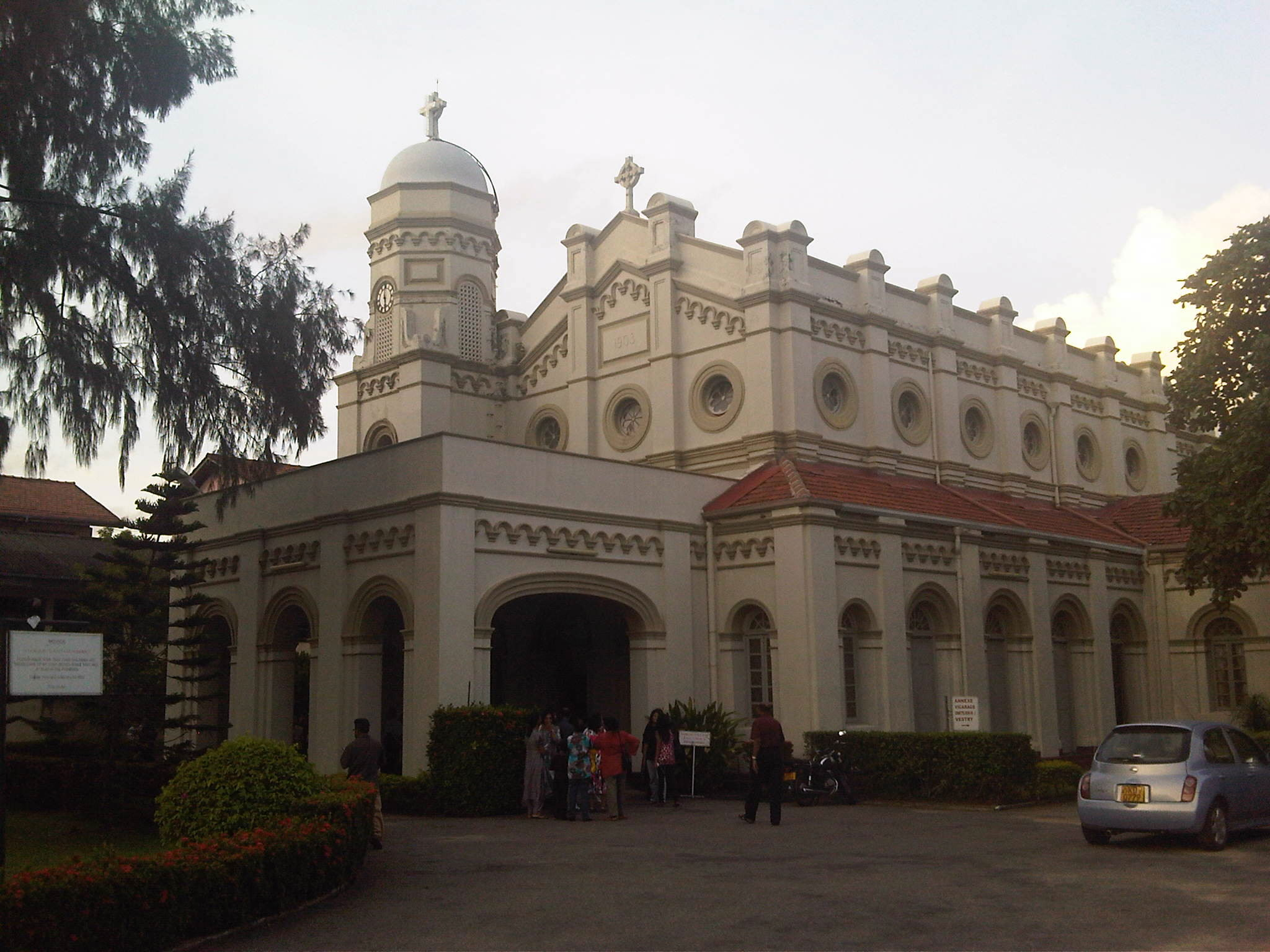
Corea built Lucien Jansz Memorial at St. Paul's Church, Milagiriya.

== St. Paul's Church in Milagiriya ==
Following the death of his wife, Ouida, Corea left St. Luke's Church in 1954 and was appointed Vicar of St. Paul's Church in Milagiriya, one of the oldest churches in Ceylon. The church was first built by the Portuguese in the 15th Century as a Roman Catholic church. The British built a new church in 1848 and called it St. Paul's. He built the Lucien Jansz Memorial at St. Paul's Church Milagiriya as well as re-building St. Peter's Church in Pamankada.

== Diocese of Colombo ==
In 1941 the bishop of Colombo appointed a Historical Select Committee to compile a history of the diocese, to celebrate the centennial of the foundation of the diocese. The bishop co-opted Corea to the committee and served as secretary.[7] Corea is also mentioned in the document as "one of four men who not only distinguished themselves in Theology, but also had the privilege of assisting their teacher in later years as Lecturers in the Divinity School. H.V.Ivan S.Corea has been honored by the bishop by being called to the office and dignity of an Examining Chaplain to the Lord Bishop of Colombo." Corea also served on the Diocesan Council of the Centenary Year in 1945. He also contributed to the Church Times newspaper in the United Kingdom.

Corea died in Madampe in 1968. Among those who paid their respects at his funeral in Maha Nuge Gardens, Colombo, were the Governor-General of Ceylon William Gopallawa, the Prime Minister of Ceylon Dudley Senanayake and the Finance Minister Junius Richard Jayewardene. The funeral service was led by Harold De Soyza, the first-ever Sri Lankan Anglican bishop of Colombo. The Ceylon Daily News noted at the time, "The Rt. Reverend Harold De Soysa, Bishop of Colombo paid tribute to the late Canon Corea referring to his ministry of loving service and made particular reference to his work on the history of the Diocese of Colombo." At the time of his death, Corea was editing a revised version of A History of the Church of Ceylon.

== Piyaneni ==
Corea was immortalized in a song in the 1970s when the Sri Lankan singer Clarence Wijewardena composed 'Piyaneni' (Father) in memory of Corea. Piyaneni was sung by Wijewardena's music partner Annesley Malewana and recorded at Auggie Ranaweera's studio in Bambalapitiya, in Colombo.

== Family ==
Corea’s eldest son is Vernon Corea, a Sri Lankan broadcaster. His younger son was Ernest Corea, who was Sri Lanka's Ambassador to the United States, Cuba and Mexico.
