= Clarence: Rhythm of the Guitar =

- Sinhala: ක්ලැරන්ස්: රිදම් ඔෆ් ගිටාර්
- Directed by: Theja Iddamalgoda
- Based on: Life of Clarence Wijewardena
- Produced by: Thusitha Jayasena
- Starring: Damith Wijayathunga; Saranga Disasekara; Nihari Perera; Dinakshie Priyasad; Srimal Wedsinghe; Fernie Roshani; Chamila Peiris
- Cinematography: Ruwan Costa
- Edited by: Yasoda Dhanupama
- Music by: Suresh Maliyadde
- Distributed by: Ridma Theatres
- Release date: 27 June 2025
- Running time: 139 minutes
- Country: Sri Lanka
- Language: Sinhala
- Box office: 250 Million LKR

Clarence: Rhythm of the Guitar (Sinhala: ක්ලැරන්ස්: රිදම් ඔෆ් ගිටාර්), is a 2025 Sri Lankan Sinhalese biographical musical film directed by late Theja Iddamalgoda and produced by Thusitha Jayasena for Art Movies. The film based on life and career of the musician Clarence Wijewardena, often referred to as the "father of Sri Lankan pop music". The film stars Damith Wijayathunga in the titular lead role where Saranga Disasekara, Nihari Perera, Dinakshie Priyasad, Srimal Wedsinghe, Fernie Roshani and Chamila Peiris played supportive roles.

The film received positive reviews from critics. The film successfully passed 50 days in theatres. The film also released on Chandstone theatre, Australia on 24 August 2025.

== Plot ==
The film is a musical drama that chronicles the life and career of Clarence Wijewardena, widely regarded as the “father of Sri Lankan pop music.” It begins by depicting Clarence’s early life in Ratnapura—known as the “City of Gems”—and traces his journey as he abandons a budding career as a planter to pursue his passion for music. The formation of the iconic band Moonstones, which delivered hits like “Mango Nenda,” “Kalu Mama,” “Ruwan Puraya,” and “Gonwassa.” The subsequent evolution into the Super Golden Chimes, following a split and later reunion with Annesley Malewana. This transformation signified a rebranding and revival in his musical trajectory. The film weaves in personal elements, including Clarence’s romantic relationship with his wife, Sheela Ramadasa, and the emotional and artistic influences that shaped his songs. Described as more than just a biopic, the film is a musical tribute and extravaganza, celebrated for its performances and for honoring Clarence’s legacy and impact on Sri Lankan music.

== Cast ==
- Damith Wijayathunga as Clarence Wijewardena
- Nihari Perera as Sheela Ramadasa, Clarence's wife
- Saranga Disasekara as young Annesley Malewana
- Dinakshie Priyasad as Indrani Perera
- Eshanka Jahanvi as Ramya
- Dushan Rajaguru
- Mauli Dushmantha
- Fernie Roshani as Mango Nanda
- Chamila Peiris
- Srimal Wedsinghe
- Shanudrie Priyasad as Iranganie Perera
- Sheshadri Priyasad as Mallika Perera
- Priyantha Wijesinghe
- Prakashani Niranjala
- Prataran Samadhi
- Rukshan Karunanayake as Mangala Rodrigo
- Prasanna Dakumpitiya as Monti Wattaladeniya
- Danushka Dias as Srikantha Dasanayake
- Induwara Sooriyabandara as Dixon Gunaratne
- Udesha Karunanayake as Vijith Peiris
- Chamod Madushan as Shanaka Perera
- Chamath Alehendre as Paul Perera
- Randeel Wasava Bandara as Conrad Gunaratne
- Lalindra Thisera
- Hemaka Dias
- Ruchi Lakmali
- Nipuni Rajapaksa
- Sandalan Silva
- Pahan V. De Costa
- Annesley Malewana himself

== Production ==
The film marked second and final film direction of Theja Iddamalgoda, who previously directed the 2022 blockbuster Ashawari. However, he died on 16 November 2024 at the age of 61. The film is produced by Thusitha Jayasena, who previously produced the 2017 blockbuster Aloko Udapadi.

Cinematography done by Ruwan Costa, where Yasoda Dhanupama is the editor and colorist. Manjula Pushpakumara is the art director, Lasantha Pradeep Udukumbura is the costume designer and Indika Udara Lanka made makeup and hair styling. Choreography done by Gayan Srimal, whereas Aruna Priyantha Kaluarachchi with sound management, Niroshan Edirimanne with assistant direction and Achini Madawala with VP Kumaran co-handled the production management. Suresh Maliyadde is the music director.

Damith Wijayathunga was selected for the lead actor role by cinematographer Ruwan Costa and Nihari Perera was selected for the lead actress role by director himself. The film also marked the maiden cinema acting for Nihari Perera.
