= Yatawatta =

Coordinates: 7°34′N 80°35′E

- Suburb
- Interactive map of Yatawatta
- Country: Sri Lanka
- Province: Central Province
- Time zone: UTC+5:30 (Sri Lanka Standard Time)

Yatawatta is a suburb of Matale, Sri Lanka. It is located in Matale District, Central Province, Sri Lanka.

It is also the name of a Kandian Family (variations include Yatawatte)

== Villages located in Yatawatta ==
- Maligatenna

== See also ==
- List of towns in Central Province, Sri Lanka
