= Batugedara =

Town in Sabaragamuwa, Sri Lanka

Coordinates: 6°41′N 80°25′E

Batugedara is a small town in the Sabaragamuwa Province of southwestern Sri Lanka, located just to the east of the province's capital of Ratnapura. It is most notable as a source for gemstones, and as a destination for tourism.

== Maps ==
- Batugedara in map of Sri Lanka
