= St. Paul's Church, Milagiriya =

St.Paul's Church Milagiriya
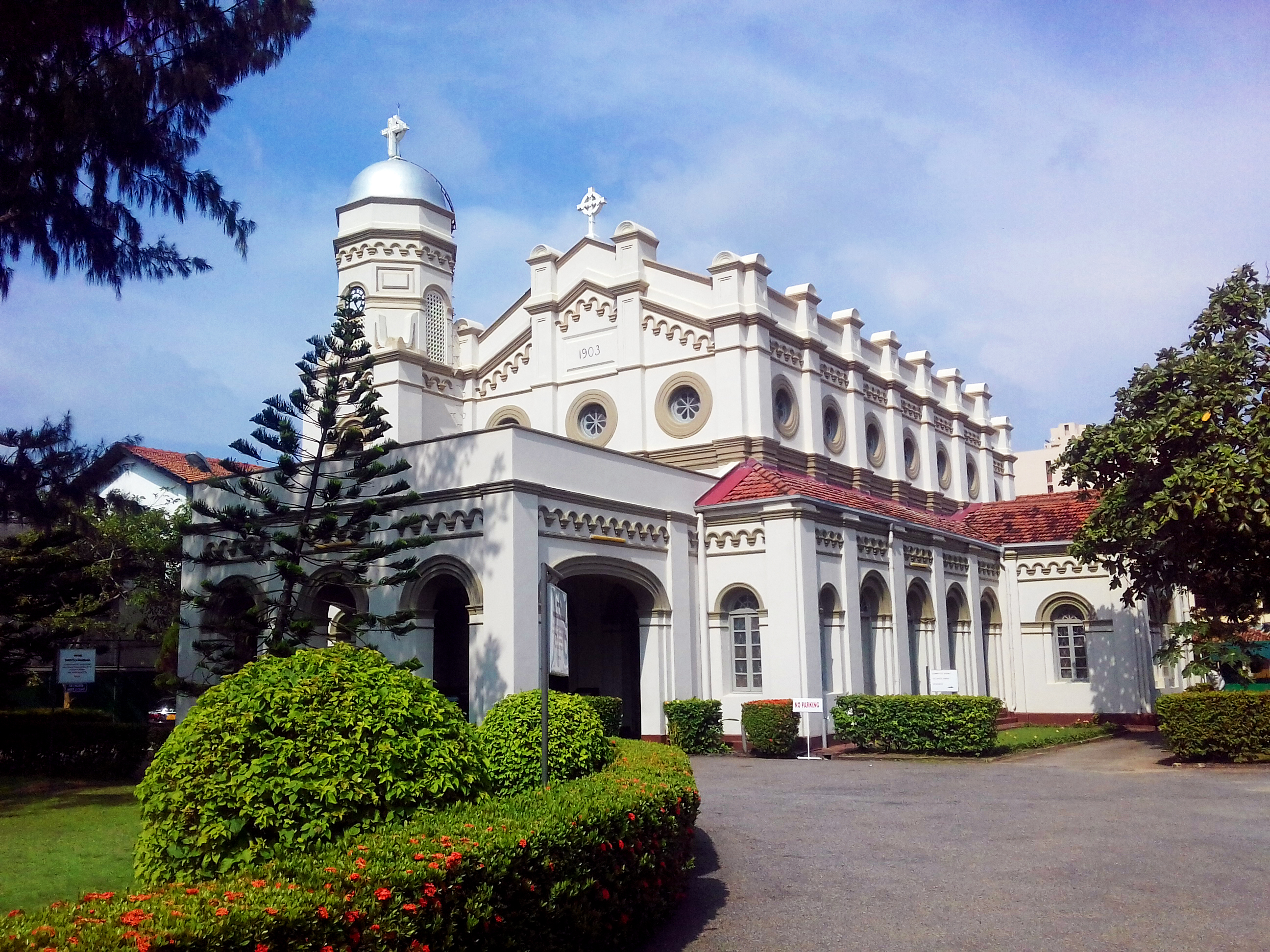
- St.Paul's Church, Milagiriya, Colombo, Sri Lanka

General information
- Type: Church
- Architectural style: Greek Basilica
- Location: Milagiriya, Colombo, Sri Lanka
- Coordinates: 6.88591°N 79.85845°E
- Owner: Anglican Church of Ceylon

St. Paul's Church is situated in the Milagiriya district of Colombo, the commercial capital of Sri Lanka. It is one of the oldest churches in Sri Lanka as now part of the Anglican Church of Ceylon.

== The Portuguese Era ==
The church was first built by the Portuguese as a Roman Catholic place of worship and was known as Nossa Senhora dos Milagres (Our Lady of Miracles). Milagiriya is the ‘Sinhalised’ name for the Portuguese word Milagres, meaning miracles. There was a well situated near the original church and during the Portuguese era, Portuguese people used to flock here as it was reputed to have miraculous properties. The sick were brought to the church from all over the island to drink the water from the well.

== Illustrated News feature ==
The London Illustrated News published a sketch of St. Paul's Church Milagiriya in 1853 when it was consecrated by the Bishop of Colombo, work on the building began in 1848.

== Vicars of St.Paul's Church Milagiriya ==
Many priests have played a role in ministering to the needs of the local community in Milagiriya from 1890 and they include: Rev. John Ford, Rev. Harry Marsh, Rev. Paul Lucien Jansz, Canon Ivan Corea, Canon Christopher W. Mutukisna, Rev. Patrick Abeyawardene, Rev. Baldwin J. Daniel, Rev. Blessing Chelliah, Rev. Bala Arulpragasam, Rev. Padma Bharati, Rev. Dhiloraj Canagasabey, Rev. Chrishantha B. Mendis, Rev.Melvin de Silva, Rev. Sunil Ferdinando and Ven. Dr. Rienzie Perera. Presently Rev.Andrew Devadason serves as the Vicar of St. Paul's Church, Milagiriya.

== The British Era ==
A British cleric, Rev. Joseph Thurston built the church dedicated to St.Paul and an industrial school was founded on the site of the church. The school is now known as St.Paul's School, Milagiriya and is a Government-run educational institution. The Church constructed in the style of a Greek Basilica was consecrated by Bishop E. A. Copleston, Bishop of Colombo. In the 1950s Reverend Canon Ivan Corea built the Rev. Lucien Jansz Memorial.

== Gallery ==
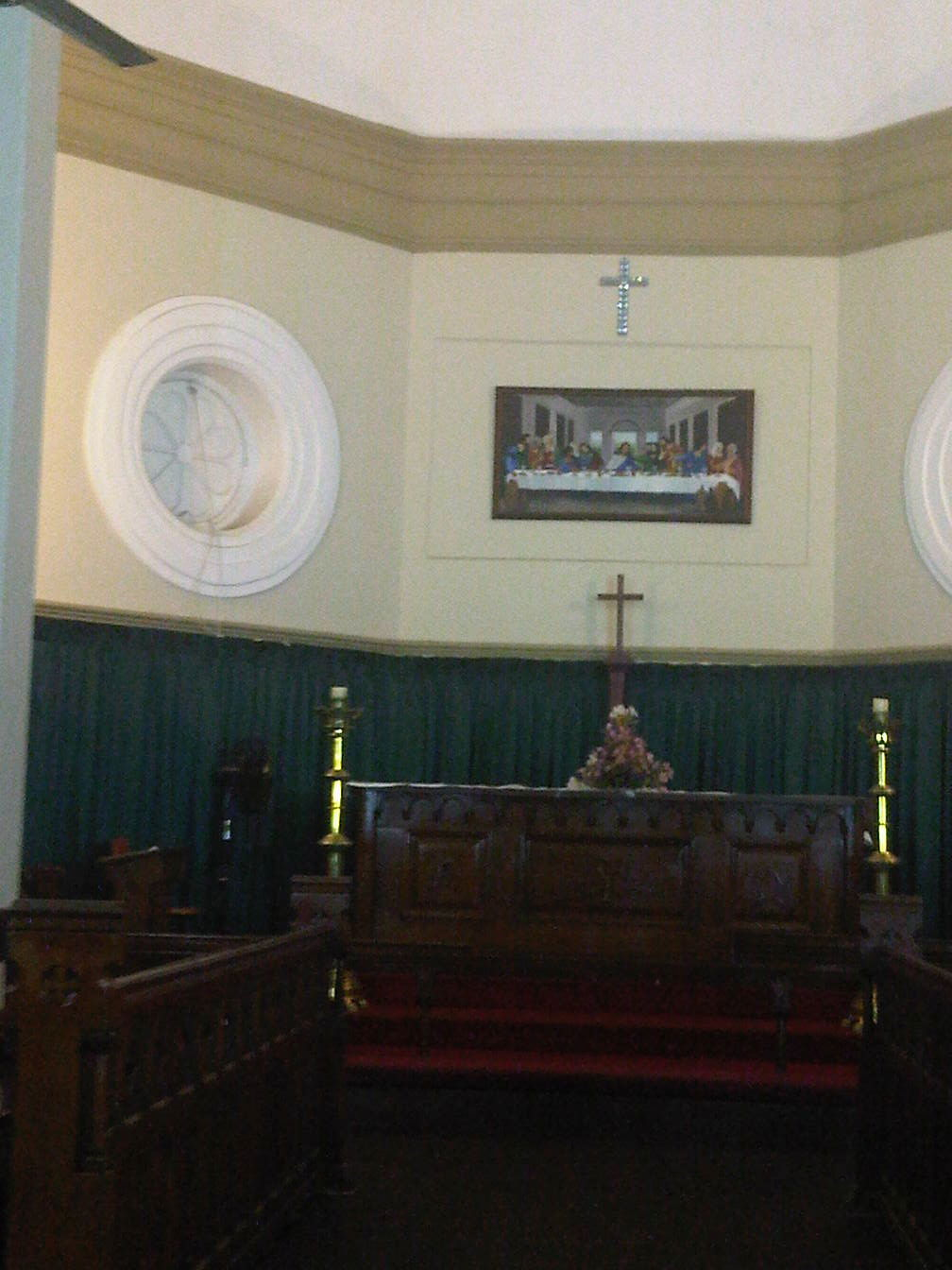
The altar of St. Paul's Church, Milagiriya.

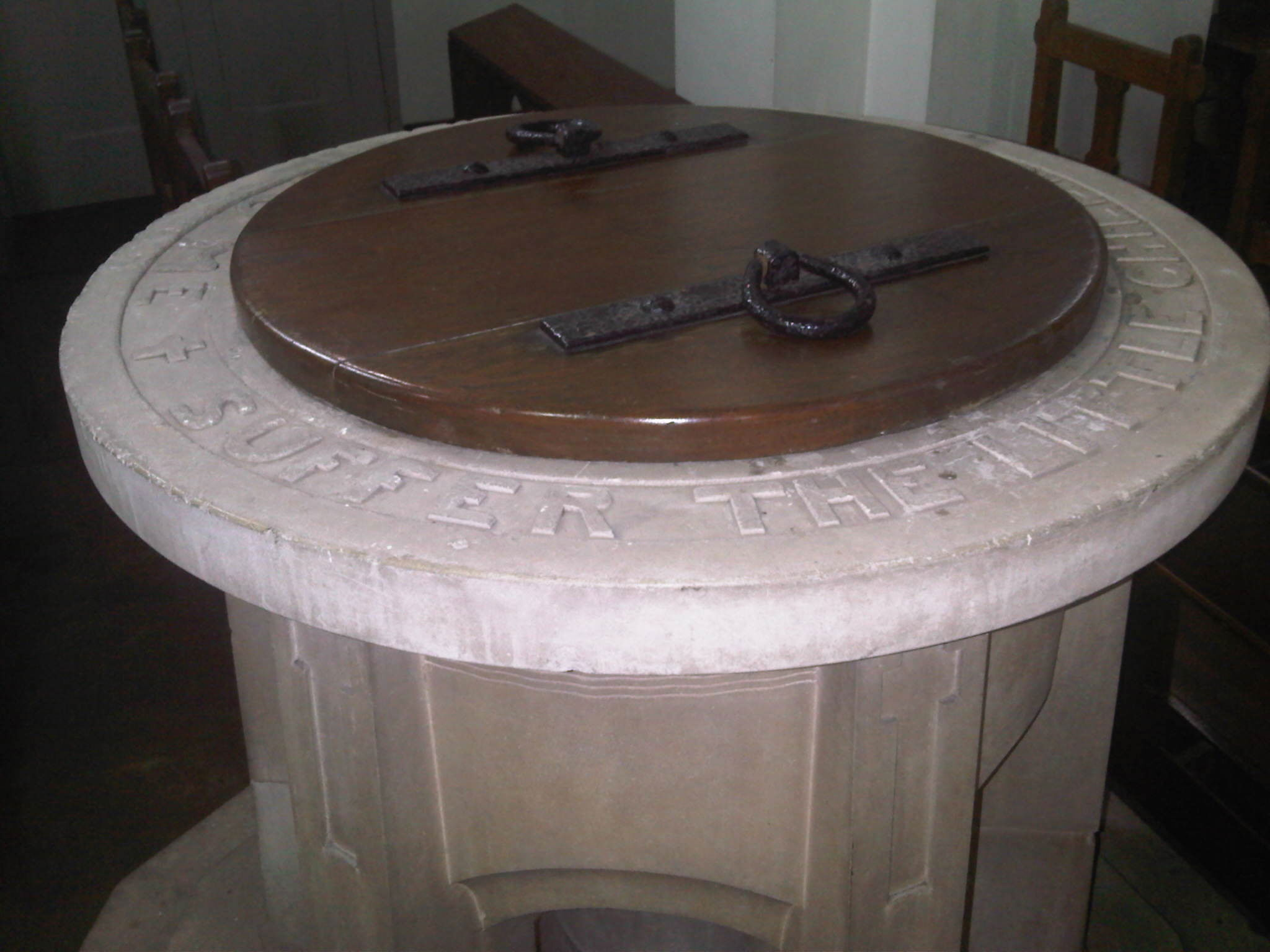
The font at St. Paul's.

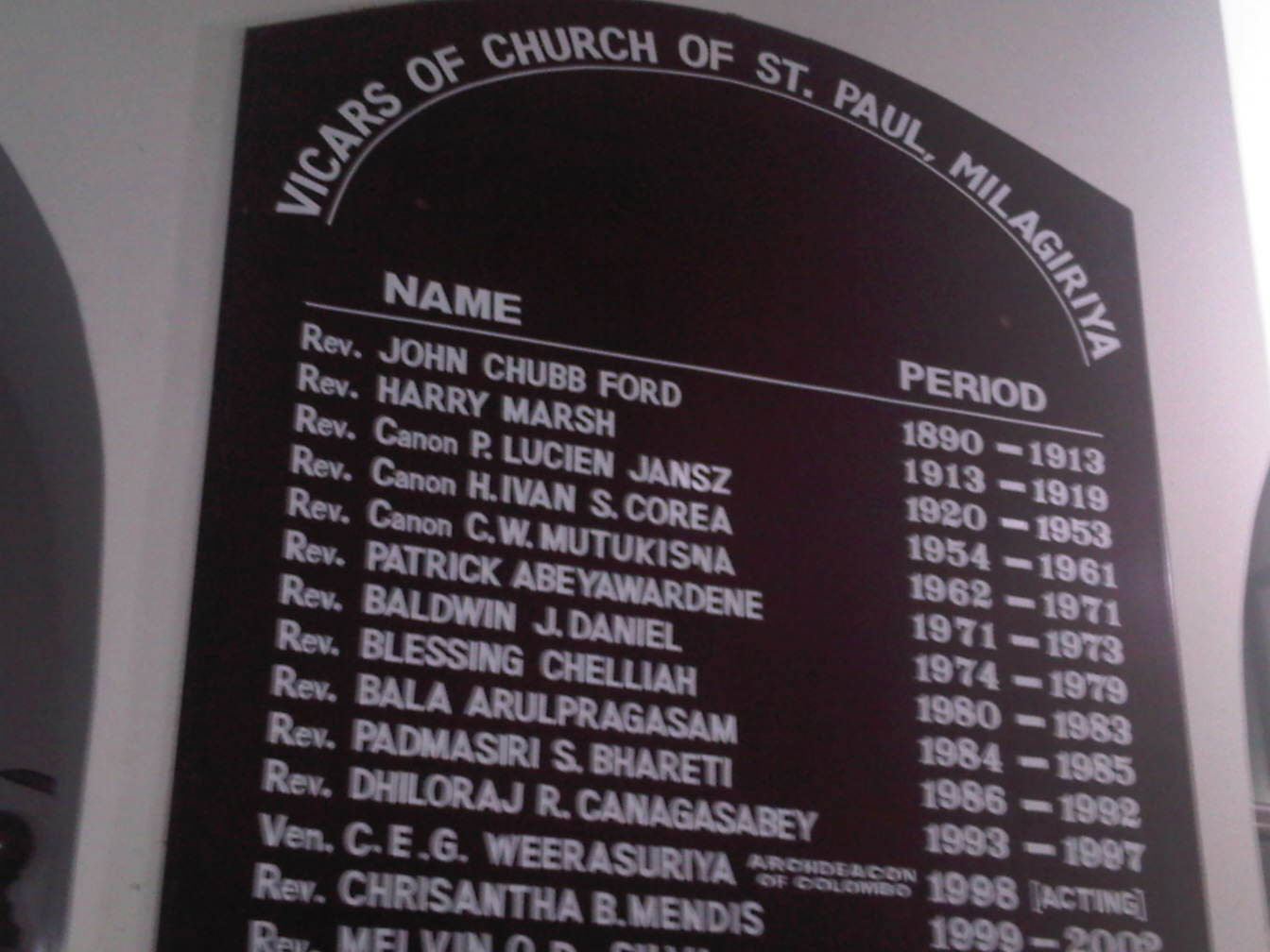
Vicars of the historic St. Paul's Church, Milagiriya.

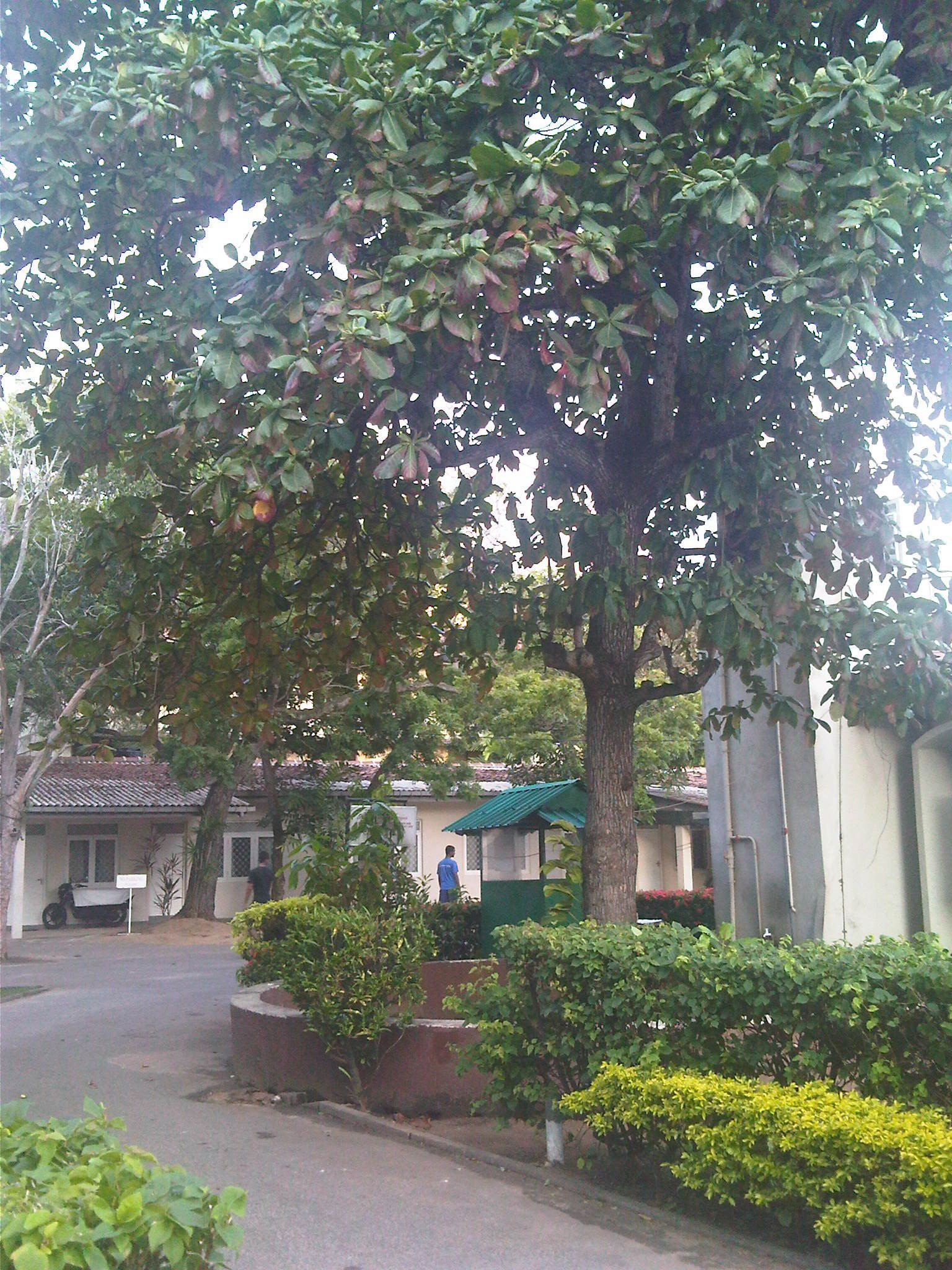
The courtyard near the Parish Hall at St. Paul's Church.

== See also ==
- Church of Ceylon
- Bishop of Colombo
- St. Paul’s Girls School, Milagiriya

== Publications ==
- One hundred years in Ceylon, or, The centenary volume of the Church Missionary Society in Ceylon, 1818–1918 (1922) Author: Balding, John William Madras: Printed at the Diocesan Press.
- The Church of Ceylon – her faith and mission Published in 1945, Printed at the Daily News Press by Bernard de Silva for the Church of Ceylon.
- The Church of Ceylon: A history, 1945–1995 Editor: Medis, Frederick Published for the Diocese of Colombo.
