= Milagiriya =

Milagiriya: Sinhala: මිලාගිරිය; Tamil: மிளகிரிய
- Suburb
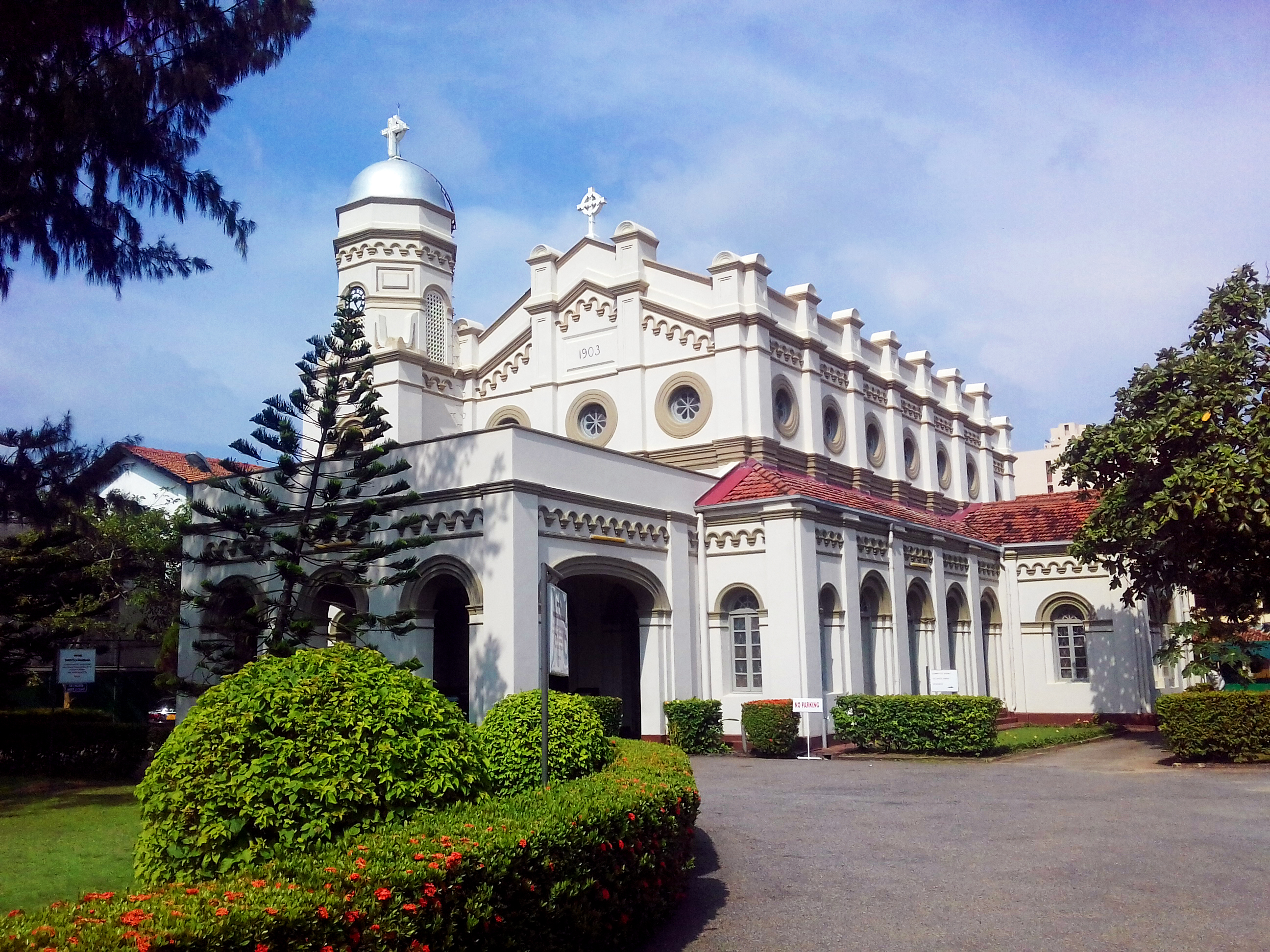
- St. Paul's Church, Milagiriya, one of the oldest churches in Sri Lanka, first built by the Portuguese and re-built by the British.

- Location within Colombo District Location within Sri Lanka
- Coordinates: 6°53′20″N 79°51′24″E
- Country: Sri Lanka
- Province: Western Province
- District: Colombo District
- Time zone: UTC+5:30 (Sri Lanka Standard Time Zone)

Milagiriya is a district of Colombo city in Sri Lanka. The area took its name from the Sinhalised form of the Portuguese word milagre (miracle). The Portuguese built a Roman Catholic Church there.

== History ==
The writer Frederick Mendis observed: "In 1656, after the capitulation to the Dutch, the Milagiriya church gave way to a Sinhalese school where instruction was made available in the religion of the Reformists. The headmaster of the school was the registrar of baptisms, marriages, and deaths. In 1848 the Rev. Joseph Thurstan was chiefly responsible for superintending the construction of the new church which was dedicated to St. Paul the Apostle."

The British built a new church on these grounds in 1848 and named it St. Paul's Church, the church is now an important landmark in Colombo.

A parish school was founded on 14 January 1887. St. Paul's Milagiriya School is now run by the Government of Sri Lanka.

== See also ==
- St. Paul's Church, Milagiriya
- Colombo
- Church of Ceylon
- St. Paul’s Girls School, Milagiriya
