= James Edward Corea =

Ceylonese colonial-era headman

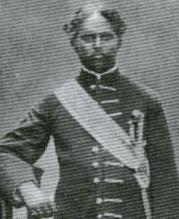
- Gate Mudaliyar of Chilaw
- Born: 2 December 1865; Chilaw, Sri Lanka
- Died: 1955 (aged 89–90); Chilaw
- Education: Colombo
- Occupation: In charge of the rural police of Pitigal Korale North
- Title: Gate Mudaliyar
- Spouse: Frances Eleanor Terentia née Ameresekera
- Children: Drayton, Melita Avilda Terentia, Edward Stanley Tarrant, James Clifford Aelian, Ouida, Acland, Edward, Ariel, Letitia, Leslie
- Parent: Johannes Christoffel

Gate Mudaliyar James Edward Corea was a Ceylonese colonial-era headman.

== Early life ==
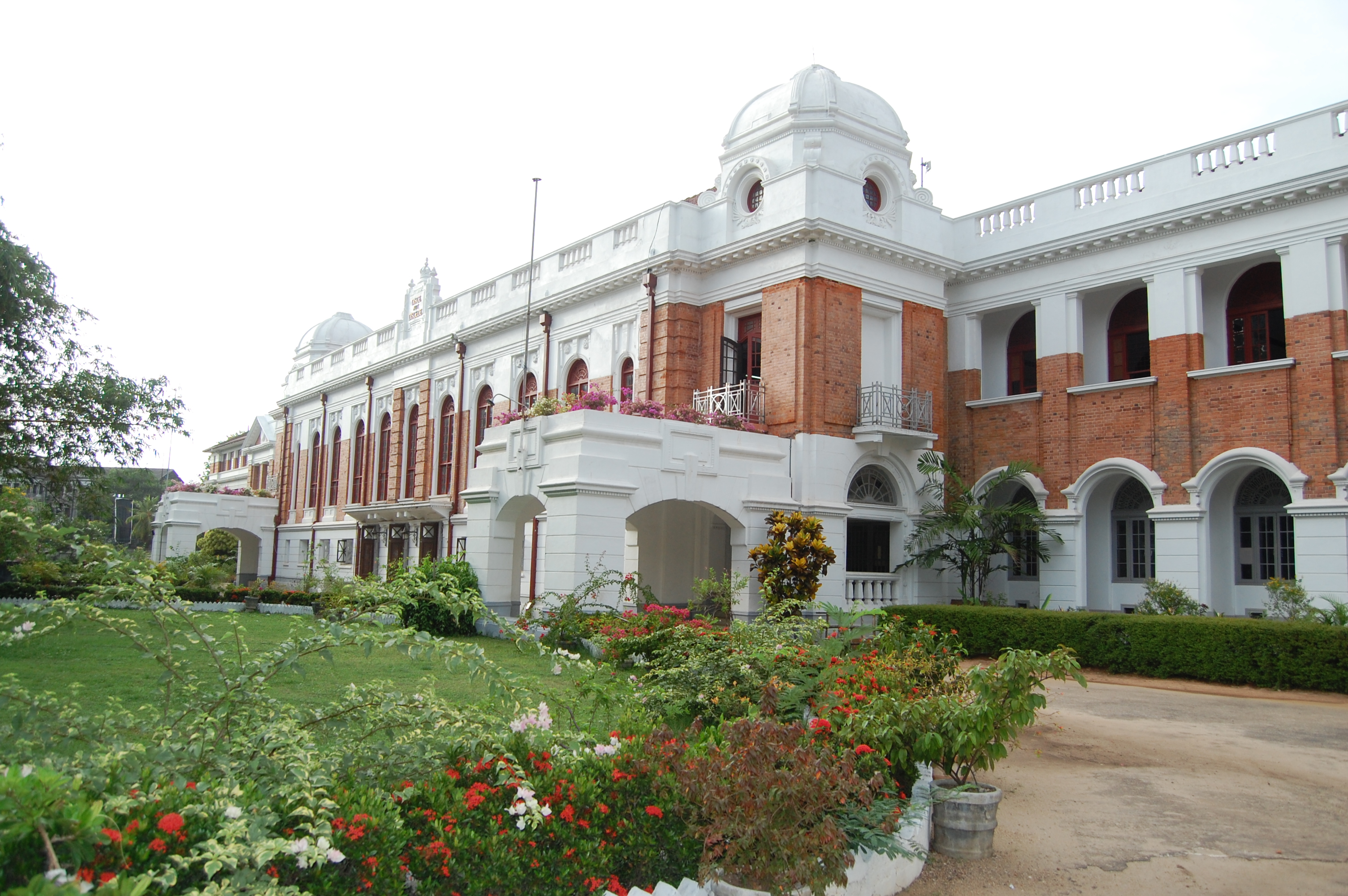
The young James Edward Corea was educated at the Royal College, Colombo.

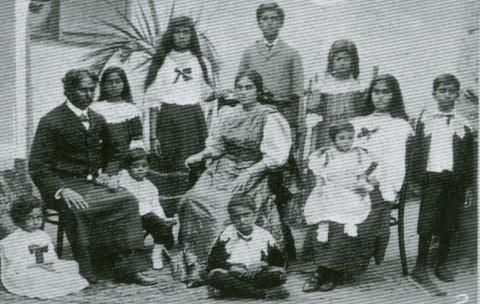
Gate Mudaliyar James Edward Corea of Chilaw with his wife and ten children.

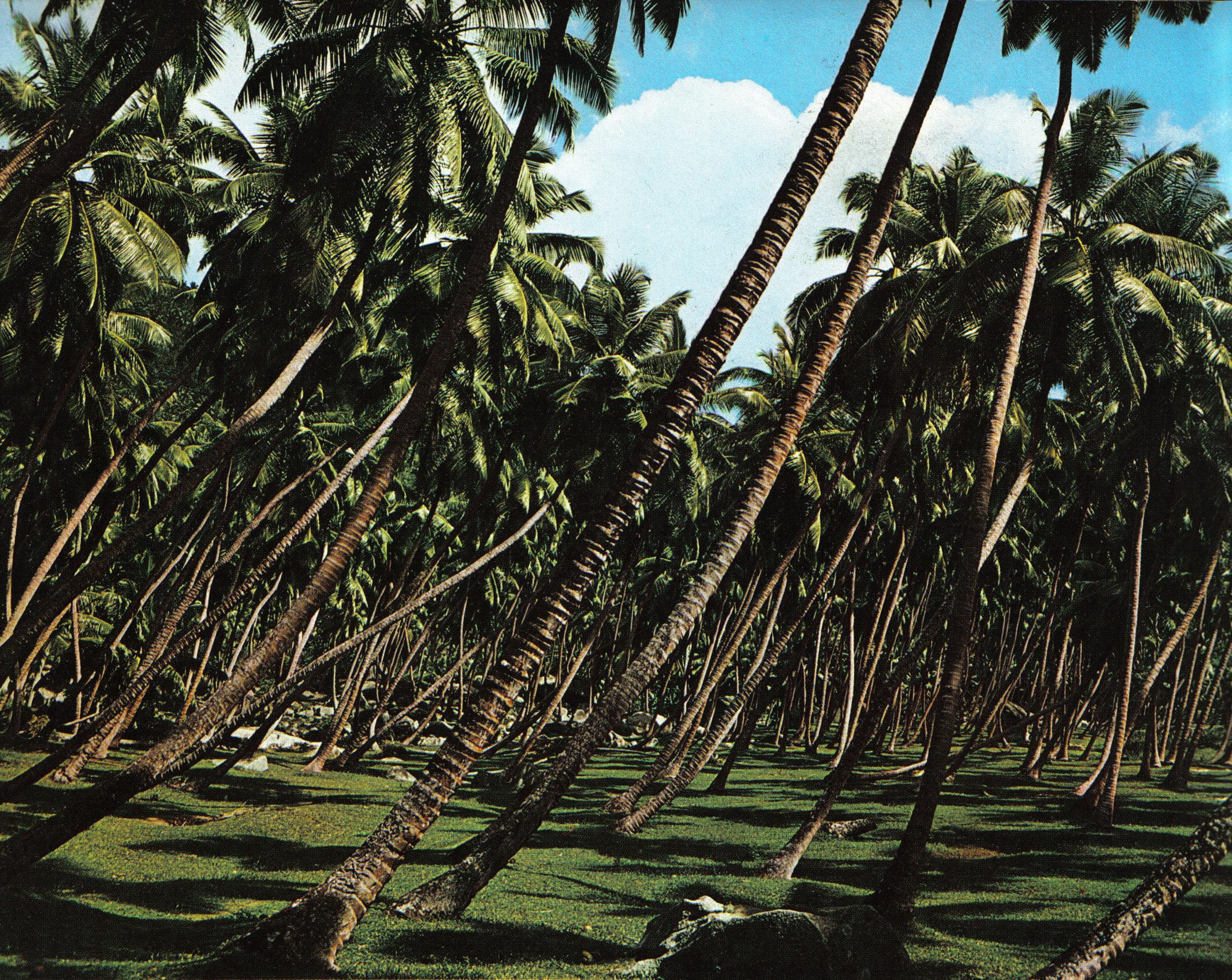
Arnold Wright in 'Twentieth Century Impressions of Ceylon,' writes that Gate Mudaliyar J.E.Corea owned extensive coconut estates as well as large tracts of paddy lands in Chilaw.

Corea was born in Chilaw, on the west coast of Sri Lanka, on 2 December 1865. His father was Johannes Christoffel Corea who was a Mudaliyar of the Chilaw District.

In the 1870s Corea was educated at one of the leading educational institutions in the country, the Colombo Academy. In 1888 he married Frances Eleanor Terentia, daughter of D. C. Ameresekera, Proctor of the Supreme Court, Kurunegala and they had ten children. They came from an Anglican Christian background.

Roper Lethbridge in 'The Golden Book of India'; a genealogical and biographical dictionary of the ruling princes, chiefs, nobles, and other personages, titled or decorated, of the Indian empire, with an appendix for Ceylon, written in 1900, mentions James Edward Corea: 'COREA, Abhayaratna Gunasekara Wi-kramasundara Wijayasekere, James Edward, Gate Mudaliyar; born 1866.

His father was Mudaliyar Johannes Christopher Corea, Mudaliyar of Chilaw, who was son of Mudaliyar Abraham Corea, brother of Mudaliyar Simon Corea.'

== The Corea family ==
J.E.Corea was a member of the Corea Family who grew in influence as a result of being wealthy land owners. The Sri Lankan author, Kumari Jayawardena, writing about the Coreas observed: 'Unconnected to the liquor trade but making their money on plantation ventures was the Corea Family of Chilaw, an influential govigama group with a history going back to Portuguese rule when they were warriors to Sinhala kings. During Dutch and British rule, members of the family were officials serving the state in various ways and rewarded with titles.'

The writer Kumari Jayawardena goes on to state that: 'While being professionals and political activists, the Coreas were also important landowners.'

== Descendant of King Dominicus Corea ==
James Edward was a direct descendant of King Dominicus Corea, who was also known as Edirille Rala. He was crowned King of Kotte and Sitawaka. His coronation was arranged by Vimala Dharma Suriya, King of Kandy, in 1596. Dominicus Corea often switching allegiances fought for all the opponents and finally changed sides and fought the Portuguese Army, he was captured and executed in Colombo on 14 July 1596.

Dominicus Corea was hailed as a 'war hero' in the Mahavamsa, the ancient chronicles of Sri Lanka.

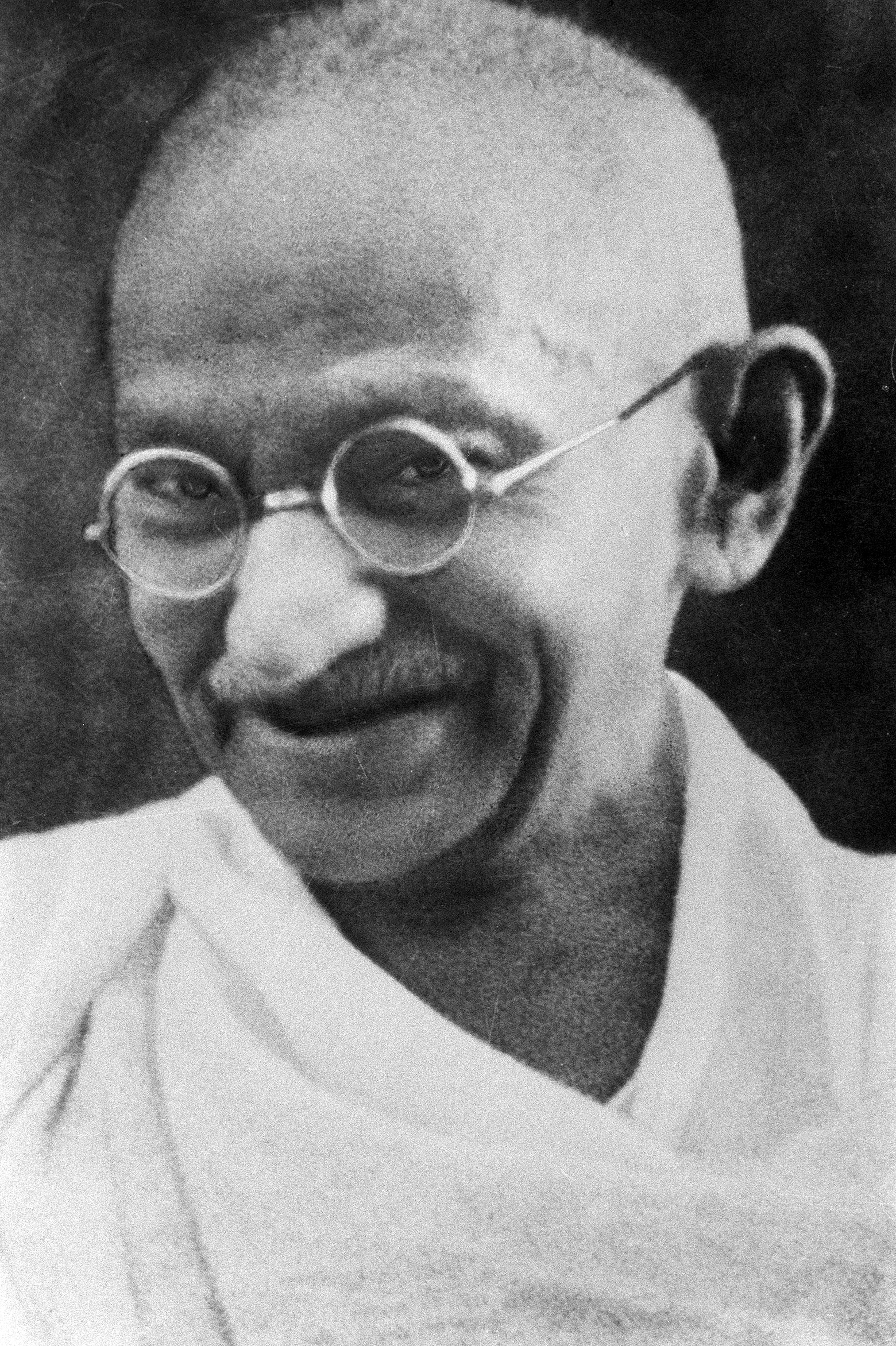
Mahatma Gandhi, the 'Father of India', visited Chilaw in 1927. Gate Mudaliyar James Edward Corea met Gandhi at 'Sigiriya,' a Corea home situated in the town.

The Coat of Arms of the Dominion of Ceylon used in the British era.

== Landed proprietor and planter ==
James Edward Corea owned vast coconut estates and paddy fields in and around the Chilaw area. Arnold Wright, writing in 1907 in his book Twentieth Century Impressions of Ceylon, noted: "James Edward Corea Abhayaratna Vijayasekera Mudaliyar Pitigal Korale, North Chilaw was educated at Colombo Academy (now Royal College, Colombo), and entered Government Service in 1887."

He was attached to the Provincial Road Committee at Kurunegala. He was appointed to the District Roads Committee in 1888 in Chilaw and in 1899 he became Mudaliyar of Pitigal Korale North. Also he was inspector of coaches and inquirer into crimes of the Chilaw District and in charge of the Rural Police of Pitigal Korale North. He was the chairman of the Village Committee and also the president of the Council of Irrigation. Also he owned extensive estates being a landed proprietor and planter. He owned Karrukkuwa, Tittakada and Tambagalle coconut estates in Chilaw district as well as large tracts of paddy lands. He was also a member of the Agricultural and Horticultural Society.

== Gate Mudaliyar ==
Recognising his influence in the world of trade and commerce on the island, the Governor of Ceylon appointed James Edward Corea, a Gate Mudaliyar of Ceylon. Mudaliyar was a colonial title & office in Sri Lanka. When the British governed the island of Ceylon, they re-introduced the 'Mudaliyar Class,' first set up by the Portuguese and then the Dutch colonial rulers. All these appointments were made by the Governor of Ceylon. The Governor delegated special duties to Gate Mudaliyar J.E. Corea.

== Meeting Mahatma Gandhi ==
When Mahatma Gandhi, the 'Father of India,' visited Ceylon for the first time in 1927, he travelled to Chilaw and met with the Corea Family including Gate Mudaliyar J.E.Corea. Gandhi was hosted in a Corea home called 'Sigiriya,' in Chilaw.

The family organised a huge banquet for Gandhi who had been invited to Chilaw by J.E.Corea's kinsemen, Charles Edgar Corea and Victor Corea, leading figures in the independence movement. Both brothers were elected members of the Legislative Council of Ceylon. They also founded the Chilaw Association and the Ceylon National Congress. Gandhi stayed for several days in Chilaw at the request of the Corea family.

== Family ==
One of the sons of J.E.Corea, J.C.A. Corea who was born in 1904 in Chilaw, created education history on the island, when he was appointed the first ever Sri Lankan Principal of the Royal College, Colombo, by the Government of Sri Lanka. Mudaliyar Corea died in the 1950s in Chilaw, Sri Lanka.

== See also ==
- Family # 3070 - Corea
- Dominicus Corea
- J.C.A. Corea
- List of political families in Sri Lanka
- Edirimanne Corea Family Union
- Mahavamsa
- Mahatma Gandhi's visit to Chilaw, Sri Lanka
- Mahatma Gandhi
- Sri Lankan Mudaliyars

== Bibliography ==
- Great Sinhalese Men and Women of History - Edirille Bandara (Domingos Corea) By John M. Senaveratna, (1937)
- A History of Sri Lanka By Professor K.M.De Silva (1981)
- Nobodies to Somebodies - The Rise of the Colonial Bourgeoisie in Sri Lanka By Kumari Jayawardena, (2000)
- Twentieth Century Impressions of Ceylon: Its History, People, Commerce, Industries and Resources By A.W. Wright, Asian Educational Services, India; New Ed edition (15 Dec 2007)
