= Vijaya Corea =

Sri Lankan broadcaster

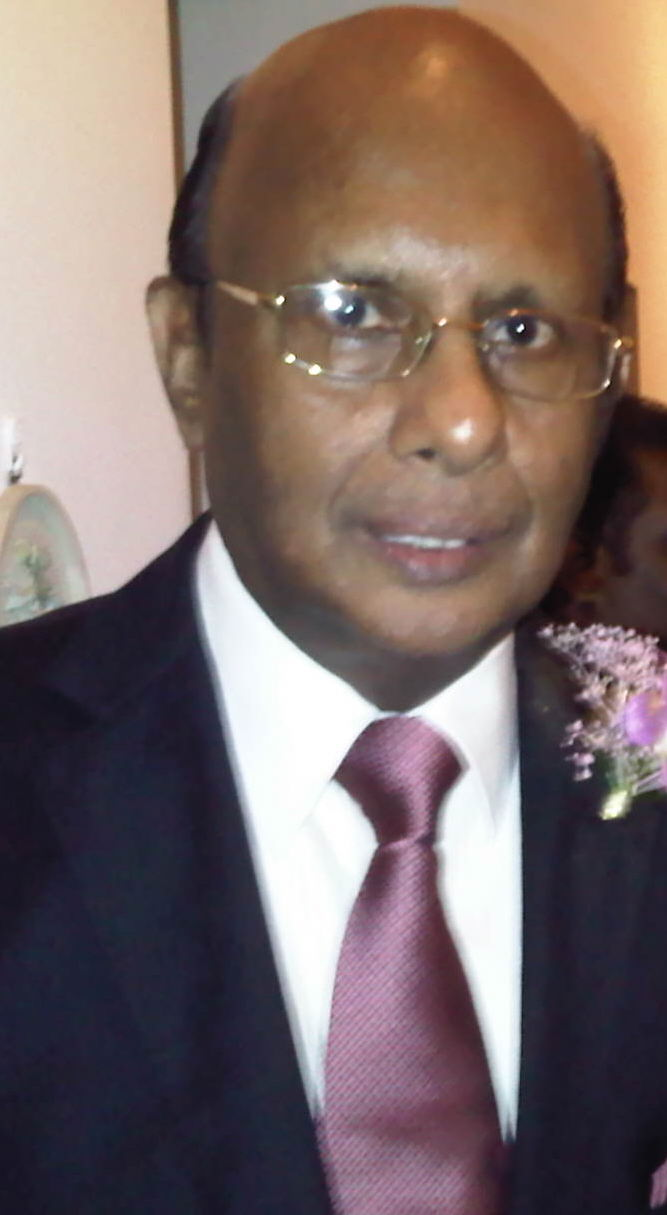
- Corea in the 1970s
- Born: Colombo, Sri Lanka
- Education: S. Thomas' College, Mount Lavinia
- Spouse: Late Ranjini Corea (married 1971) Milani Champika Corea (married 2015 - present)
- Children: Viran Corea (son) Sashika Corea (daughter) Milanjaya Corea (son)
- Parent(s): Dr. C. V. S. Corea and Amybelle Corea
- Relatives: Victor Corea (Grandfather) Ravale Corea (Grandson)

Vijaya Corea is a radio presenter and television broadcaster from Sri Lanka.

== ECFU ==
Vijaya Corea is the Patron of the Edirimanne Corea Family Union, in Colombo, Sri Lanka. The official Corea website carries more of his family.

== Biography ==
In 2024, Life Away From The Stage and Microphone was published by Jam Fruit Tree Publications.
