= London Sounds Eastern =

- Created by: BBC Radio London 206
- Presented by: Vernon Corea

Production
- Executive producer: Keith Yeomans
- Running time: 30-60 minutes

Original release
- Network: BBC Radio London
- Release: 12 September 1976 – 1985

London Sounds Eastern is an ethnic minority radio programme on the BBC. It was presented by Vernon Corea and produced by Keith Yeomans.

== The Launching of London Sounds Eastern -BBC Radio London ==
The programme went on the airwaves on a Sunday evening on BBC Radio London. It enjoyed a huge multi-cultural radio audience and was even highlighted in the BBC Radio Times in 1976. London Sounds Eastern created broadcasting history in the United Kingdom: it was the first ever Asian programme in English, on the BBC. Until the launch of 'London Sounds Eastern,' Asian radio programmes in the United Kingdom were mostly in the Hindi and Urdu languages and the programme replaced two 30-minute shows which had been broadcast in the Bengali, Hindi and Urdu languages.

== Ethnic Minority Broadcasting on the BBC ==
'London Sounds Eastern' was a real breakthrough in terms of ethnic minority broadcasting. It expanded musical horizons featuring music as diverse as the ghazals of Pakistan, raagas from India and baila from Sri Lanka. It even featured music from China and Singapore.

Vernon Corea, presenter of London Sounds Eastern was appointed Asian Programmes Officer of the BBC and trained broadcasters from minority ethnic communities for the BBC Local Radio network. Among those who sought advice on a career in radio was the BBC TV Presenter George Alagiah. Vernon Corea went on to be the BBC's Ethnic Minorities Adviser.

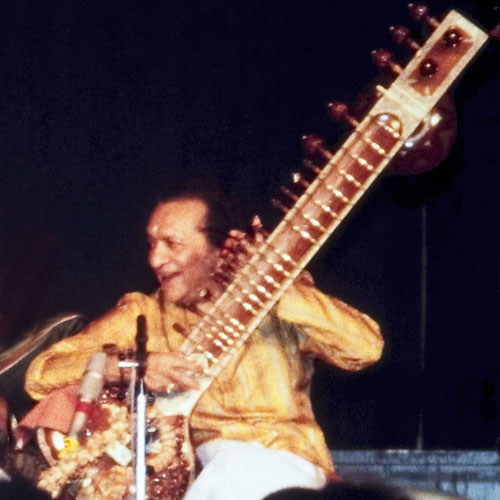
Vernon Corea interviewed Ravi Shankar on 'London Sounds Eastern'

== South Asian Stars on the BBC ==
A whole host of Asian stars were featured - Lata Mangeshkar, Asha Bhosle, Usha Uthup, Ravi Shankar, Pandith Amaradeva, Asian actress Jamila Massey and her husband the writer Reginald Massey, Clarence Wijewardene, Annesley Malewana, Mignonne Fernando, Nimal Mendis, The Gypsies, Desmond de Silva were some of the South Asian stars on 'London Sounds Eastern.' Their music reached new audiences in London and hundreds of fans wrote in to BBC Radio London. Vernon Corea featured the different sounds of the Indian sub-continent, from ragaas to contemporary baila.

== South Asian Heads of State on the programme ==
Heads of State have also appeared on the radio programme among them the President of Sri Lanka. Vernon Corea, the presenter of 'London Sounds Eastern' also met with the President of the Maldives when he was invited to the islands to train Maldivian broadcasters at Radio Maldives.

== BBC Asian Network ==
The programme pioneered the way for the BBC Asian Network. Ravi Shankar was among the celebrities interviewed by Vernon Corea for London Sounds Eastern.

Listen to the BBC Radio London Jingles from the 1970s - 1980s:

- John Allen's BBC Radio London 206 Pages

== See also ==
- BBC London 94.9
- Vernon Corea
