= Annesley Malewana =

Sri Lankan musician

Annesley Malewana ඇනස්ලි මාලේවන
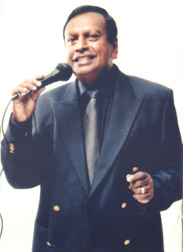
- Born: Annesley Aloysius Lakshman Malewana; 13 June 1947 (age 79); Ratnapura, Sri Lanka
- Education: St. Joseph's College, Colombo
- Occupations: Singer, composer
- Spouse: Swarnamali Malewana (m. 1978)
- Children: 2
- Musical career
- Genres: Pop; soul; rhythm and blues; Indian classical music
- Instrument: Vocals
- Years active: 1966–present
- Labels: Nilwala; MEntertainment; Ransilu

Annesley Aloysius Lakshman Malewana, popularly known as Annesley Malewana (Sinhala pronunciation: [ˈænəsli ˈmaːləvənə]) (Sinhala: ඇනස්ලි මාලේවන; born 13 June 1947), is a Sri Lankan musician. Often considered "The Prince of Sinhala Pop", Malewana is well known for being a master of contemporary Baila worked with popular musical bands The Moonstones and Super Golden Chimes.

== Personal life ==
Malewana was born on 13 June 1947, in Ratnapura, Sri Lanka and attended St. Joseph's College, Colombo.

He is married to Swarnamali and the couple has one son and one daughter.

== Musical career ==
Upon leaving school, he met Clarence Wijewardena, and the two formed the group Moonstones in 1966. In the early 1960s, the Moonstones began performing songs composed by Wijewardena and sung by Malewana. Their first hit was Mango Nanda, a song written about the maid who once worked at the home of Clarence's wife in the early days of their relationship.

The Moonstones were managed by the advertising man Sri Sangabo Corea and were mentored by the Radio Ceylon broadcaster Vernon Corea and his cousin Vijaya Corea. They first featured on a program called "Saturday Star" on Radio Ceylon. Their music was featured for the very first time on the English Services of Radio Ceylon and subsequently the Sri Lanka Broadcasting Corporation. They became household names as a result of the airplay on Radio Ceylon throughout the 1960s. After few years, Wijewardena formed "Golden Chimes" and left "The Moonstones". However, later all reunited again and formed the band "Super Golden Chimes". The band produced many popular songs such as Udarata Niliya and Gamen liyumak.

During the 1960s, 1970s, and 1980s, the songs of the 'Moonstones' and the 'Super Golden Chimes' were on the top of popularity. His songs topped the charts on both the English Service and the Sinhala Service on Radio Ceylon for decades. In 1977, he got a job at a Private company and temporarily left the band.

Malewana and Wijewardena remained friends and reunited in the 1970s to form a group dubbed the Super Golden Chimes - this group would, similarly, produce a string of popular songs that included Udarata Niliya, Sihina Pathum, Wana Bambaro, and Sathuta Senasuma. The Super Golden Chimes performed for another eight years until, in 1978, Malewana married, and announced his retirement from music. Despite his retirement, Malewana returned in 1988 as a solo artist and continued to record songs, particularly for CDs released in Sri Lanka. In 2005 he formed the band Annesley & The Super Chimes. His song Kageda Gon Wassa was censored between 1970 and 1977 by the prevailed government because people started hinting at the government with this song. In 1984, he made playback singing with the film Shirani directed by M. H. Gafoor.

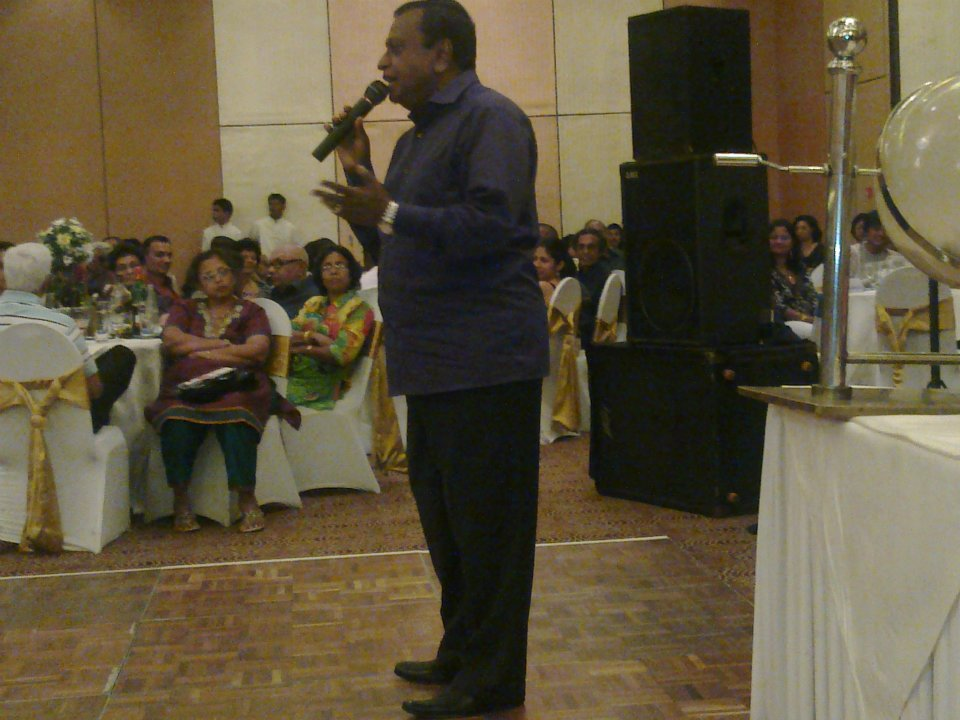
Sri Lankan music Superstar, Annesley Malewana, at the Edirimanne Corea Family Union Sing-A-Long charity event held in the Grand Ballroom of the Galadari Hotel in Colombo, Sri Lanka in November 2011.

On 27 July 2013, he organised a musical show "Sing Along with Annesley Malewana" at Hotel Taj Samudra Rooftop as a fundraiser for Lion Sight First Hospital. On 6 August 2016, Malewana celebrated 50 years of his singing career with a grand musical show titled ‘50 Year Reflection’ which was held at the BMICH at 7 pm.

== Controversy ==
In 2009, Wijewardena's wife and daughter filed a case against Malewana by citing that Clarence's songs were sung without permission. They said some of the songs such as Kalu Mama, Goyam Kapanawa, Rosa Male and Sudu Menike were first claimed to be theirs. Then they made a list of about 27 songs and told Malewana that he had no right to sing them. But those songs have been sold to Wickramasooriya and company. In the same contracts that were sold Malewana have signed for "Moonstone" and "Super Golden Chimes". The summons, in this case, was handed over on December 23, 2010. An enjoining order had been imposed so that not a single song could be sung. However, his innocence has been proved justified in court.

== Legacy ==
The songs performed by Malewana and Clarence over their three decades have recently been credited, by the group Pahan Silu, as having served to influence them in crafting their unique musical style.

His voice has been heard by Londoners over BBC Radio London 206 on the London Sounds Eastern radio program and on community radio in the United States and in Australia.

== In popular culture ==
Malewana is portrayed by Saranga Disasekara in Theja Iddamalgoda's 2025 film Rhythm of the Guitar: Clarence.

== See also ==
- Radio Ceylon
- Sri Lanka Broadcasting Corporation
- Clarence Wijewardena
