= Timeline of radio =

The timeline of radio lists within the history of radio, the technology and events that produced instruments that use radio waves and activities that people undertook. Later, the history is dominated by programming and contents, which is closer to general history.

== Origins and developments ==
Although development of the first radio wave communication system is attributed to Guglielmo Marconi, his was just the practical application of 80 years of scientific advancement in the field including the predictions of Michael Faraday, the theoretical work of James Clerk Maxwell, and the experimental demonstrations of Heinrich Rudolf Hertz.

- 1780–1784: George Adams notices sparks between charged and uncharged conductors when a Leyden jar was discharged nearby.
- 1789–1791: Luigi Galvani notices a spark generated nearby causes a convulsion in a frog's leg being touched by a scalpel. In different experiments, he notices contractions in frogs' legs caused by lightning and a luminous discharge from a charged Leyden jar that disappeared over time and was renewed whenever a spark occurred nearby.
- 1820: Hans Christian Ørsted discovers the relationship between electricity and magnetism in a very simple experiment. He demonstrates that a wire carrying a current was able to deflect a magnetized compass needle.
- 1831: Michael Faraday begins a series of experiments in which he discovers electromagnetic induction. The relation was mathematically modeled by Faraday's law, which subsequently becomes one of the four Maxwell equations. Faraday proposes that electromagnetic forces extended into the empty space around the conductor but does not complete his work involving that proposal.
- 1835: Peter Samuel Munk observes the permanent increase of the electrical conductivity of a mixture of loose metal filings in a glass tube with two metal plugs in it resulting from the passage of a discharge current of a Leyden jar through it. This is an early example of the coherer effect.
- 1842: Joseph Henry publishes his experimental results showing the oscillatory nature of the discharge in leyden jars and describes how a generated spark could magnetize a needle surrounded by a coil up to 220 feet away. He also describes how a lightning strike 8 miles away magnetized a needle surrounded by a coil, an effect that was most probably caused by radio waves. He considered both of these effects to be due to electromagnetic induction at the time.
- 1852: Samuel Alfred Varley notices a remarkable fall in the resistance of masses of metallic filings under the action of atmospheric electrical discharges.
- 1864: James Clerk Maxwell predicts the existence of electromagnetic waves in his paper 'a dynamical theory of the electromagnetic field'.
- 1871: Edwin Houston, while setting up a large sparking Ruhmkorff coil to be used in a demonstration, notices he can draw sparks from metal objects throughout the room. He attributes this to induction.
- 1875: While experimenting with an acoustic telegraph, Thomas Edison notices an electromagnet producing unusual sparks. He finds this strange sparking could be conducted 25 miles along telegraph wires and be detected a few feet from the wire. To prove it was not electromagnetic induction he set up an experiment where he shows sparks in a spark detector but no effect in a gold-leaf electroscope and a galvanometer along the same line. On 28 November 1875 he announces to the press what he terms a new "etheric force".
- December 1875: Edwin Houston, with the help of Elihu Thomson, conducts an improved version Edison's experiment at Central High School in Philadelphia, Pennsylvania using a Ruhmkorff coil and a spark detector. Thompson notices he can draw sparks from metal objects throughout the building and looks on the phenomenon as a possible new form of communication. Houston publishes his results, concluding that the phenomenon they and Edison produced was simply an induction phenomenon he had identified in 1871, claiming Edison was misidentifying a rapidly switching polarity.
- 1878: David E. Hughes notices that sparks generated by an induction balance cause noise in an improved telephone microphone he was developing. He rigs up a portable version of his receiver and, carrying it down a street, finds the sparking can be detected at some distance.
- 1879: German physicist Hermann von Helmholtz proposes the "Berlin Prize" for anyone who could experimentally prove a key aspect of Maxwell's electromagnetic theory thinking his star student, Heinrich Rudolf Hertz, could win the prize. Hertz declines working on the prize, seeing no way to produce a test apparatus.
- 1880: David Hughes demonstrates his discovery to the Royal Society, but is told it is merely induction.
- 1883: Irish physicist George Francis FitzGerald publishes a formula for the power radiated by a small loop antenna, showing it as proportional to the fourth power of the frequency.
- 1884: During his time as a lecturer in theoretical physics at Kiel University, Heinrich Hertz produces an analysis of Maxwell's equations showing they did have more validity than the then prevalent "action at a distance" theories.
- 1884: Temistocle Calzecchi-Onesti at Fermo in Italy discovers that metal filings between two brass plates clump together in reaction to electric sparks occurring at a distance. He thinks it could be used for detecting lightning. His little noticed paper is published in an Italian journal and he does not pursue the phenomenon further. (Considered an early type of "coherer").
- 1885: Edison takes out a patent on a system of wireless communication between ships via electrostatic induction through sea water. The system proves to be too short range to be practical.

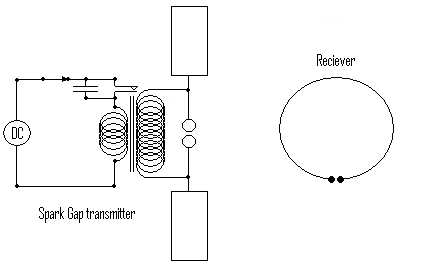
1887 experimental setup of Hertz's apparatus.

- 1886 to 1888: After noticing how discharging an electric current into a coil produced a spark in a second nearby coil, Heinrich Hertz sees a way to build a test apparatus to solve von Helmholtz "Berlin Prize" problem. Hertz conducts a series of experiments that validates Maxwell's theory of electromagnetic radiation and proves that it can travel through free space (radio). He demonstrates the radiation has the properties of visible light, the properties of waves (now called Transverse waves), and discovers that the electromagnetic equations could be reformulated into a partial differential equation called the wave equation.
- Spring 1888: British physicist Sir Oliver Lodge conducts experiments that seem to show electromagnetic waves traveling along wires. He took this as a way to prove Maxwell's electromagnetic theory but learns of Hertz' published proofs at the same time.
- 1885 to 1892: Murray, Kentucky farmer Nathan Stubblefield conducts wireless transmissions some claim to be radio, but his devices seem to have worked by induction transmission rather than radio transmission.
- 1890: French physicist and inventor Edouard Branly does a thorough investigation of metal filings in an evacuated tube and how they are sensitive to electric sparks at a distance, an effect later to be called the coherer by Lodge.
- 1891: Irish physicist Frederick Thomas Trouton suggests using a fast rotating alternator as a wireless transmitter and that the new "Hertzian waves" could be used to replace light houses with "electric houses" that would operate in fog.
- February 1892: British chemist and physicist William Crookes publishes an article suggesting "Hertzian waves" (radio waves) could be, and he claimed already were being used in wireless telegraphy.
- July 1892: Elihu Thompson writes that "signalling or telegraphing for moderate distances without wires, and even through dense fog may be an accomplished fact soon".
- 1892: Branly's filing tube comes to light when it is described by Dr. Dawson Turner at a meeting of the British Association in Edinburgh.
- 1892: Scottish electrical engineer and astronomer George Forbes suggests Branly's filing tube may react in the presence of Hertzian waves.
- 1893: Nikola Tesla delivers a lecture "On Light and other High Frequency Phenomena" before the Franklin Institute in Philadelphia and the National Electric Light Association St Louis. Dubious of the existence air-borne radio waves, he proposes a wireless lighting and wireless electric power transmission system that would work on air and ground conduction. He also notes the system could carry messages.
- March 1893: American physicist Amos Dolbear predicts telegraphing without wires using "A beam of Hertzian rays" in Donahoe's Magazine.
- 1893: Physicist W. B. Croft exhibits Branly's experiments at a meeting of the Physical Society in London. It is unclear to Croft and others whether the filings in the Branly filing tube are reacting to sparks or the light from the sparks. George Minchin notices the [Branly] tube may be reacting to Hertzian waves the same way his solar cell does and writes the paper "The Action of Electromagnetic Radiation on Films containing Metallic Powders". These papers are read by Lodge who sees a way to build a much improved Herzian wave detector.
- 1 January 1894: Heinrich Rudolf Hertz dies.
- 1 June 1894: Oliver Lodge delivers a memorial lecture on Hertz where he demonstrates the optical properties of "Hertzian waves" (radio), including transmitting them over a short distance, using an improved version of Branly's filing tube, which Lodge has named the "coherer", as a detector. He also demonstrates controlling frequency by changing inductance and capacitance in his circuits.
- November 1894: Building on Lodge's published work, Indian physicist Jagdish Chandra Bose, sets up a small laboratory at Presidency Collage, Calcutta to explore radio microwave optics.
- December 1894: In Italy, Guglielmo Marconi conducts experiments in pursuit of building a wireless telegraph system based on Herzian waves (radio), demonstrated a radio transmitter and receiver to his mother, a set-up that made a bell ring on the other side of the room by pushing a telegraphic button on a bench. Financed by his family, over the next year he works on adapting experimental equipment into a radio wave telegraphic transmitter and receiver system that could work over long distances. This is considered to be the first development of a radio system specifically for communication.
- May 1895: After reading about Lodge's demonstrations, the Russian physicist Alexander Popov builds a "Hertzian wave" (radio wave) based lightning detector using a coherer.
- November 1895: Jagdish Chandra Bose sets up a demonstration of radio microwave at the Town Hall in Calcutta where he ignites gunpowder in a nearby room and rings a bell.
- 1896: Alexander Popov demonstrates the transmission of signals between buildings at the University of St. Petersburg.
- 1896: Marconi was awarded a patent for radio with British Patent 12039, Improvements in Transmitting Electrical Impulses and Signals and in Apparatus There-for. This is the initial patent for radio-based wireless telegraphy.
- 1896: Bose goes to London on a lecture tour and meets Marconi, who was conducting wireless experiments for the British post office.
- 1897: Marconi establishes a radio station on the Isle of Wight, England.
- 1897: Tesla applies for several wireless power patents in the U.S. (issued in early 1900).
- 1897: Although Australia's first officially recognised broadcast was made in 1906, some sources claim that there were transmissions in Australia in 1897, either conducted solely by Professor William Henry Bragg of the University of Adelaide or by Prof. Bragg in conjunction with G.W. Selby of Melbourne.
- 1898: Marconi opened the first radio factory, on Hall Street, Chelmsford, England, employing around 50 people.
- 1899: Bose announced his invention of the "iron-mercury-iron coherer with telephone detector" in a paper presented at Royal Society, London.
- 1899: Tesla experiments with wireless power in Colorado Springs. He listens to static from thunderstorms trying to determine values for what he believes is a native electrical charge and frequency of the Earth. Using sensitive electromagnetic receivers he picks up repeating signals he thinks may be from beings on another planet. An alternative explanation is that Tesla may have heard Marconi's wireless telegraphy demonstrations in Europe.
- 1900: Reginald Fessenden makes a weak transmission of voice over the airwaves.
- July 1901: Tesla begins construction of his Wardenclyffe Tower wireless transmission facility. The project runs out of funding by 1905 and is never completed.
- December 1901: Marconi claims to have received in St John's, Newfoundland a radio signal transmitted from Poldhu in Cornwall (UK).
- February 1902: Marconi starts conducting more organized and documented tests sailing on board the SS Philadelphia west from Great Britain recording signals sent daily from the Poldhu station showing reception up to 2,100 miles (3,400 km).
- December 1902: the Marconi station in Glace Bay, Nova Scotia, Canada, transmits the first signal from North America back to Great Britain.
- 1904: The United States Patent and Trademark Office reverses its decision, awarding Marconi a patent for the invention of radio.
- 1905: Karl Ferdinand Braun invents the phased array antenna, which leads to the development of radar, smart antennas and MIMO.
- 1906: In Australia, Ernest Fisk of AWA conducts an isolated experiment in which music was broadcast.

== Spark-gap telegraphy ==
Using various patents, the "Marconi Company" was established and began communication between coast radio stations and ships at sea. This company, along with its subsidiary Marconi Wireless Telegraph Company of America, had a stranglehold on ship to shore communication. It operated much the way American Telephone and Telegraph operated until 1983, owning all of its own equipment and refusing to communicate with non-Marconi equipped ships. Around the turn of the century, the Slaby-Arco wireless system was developed by Adolf Slaby and Georg von Arco (later incorporated into Telefunken).

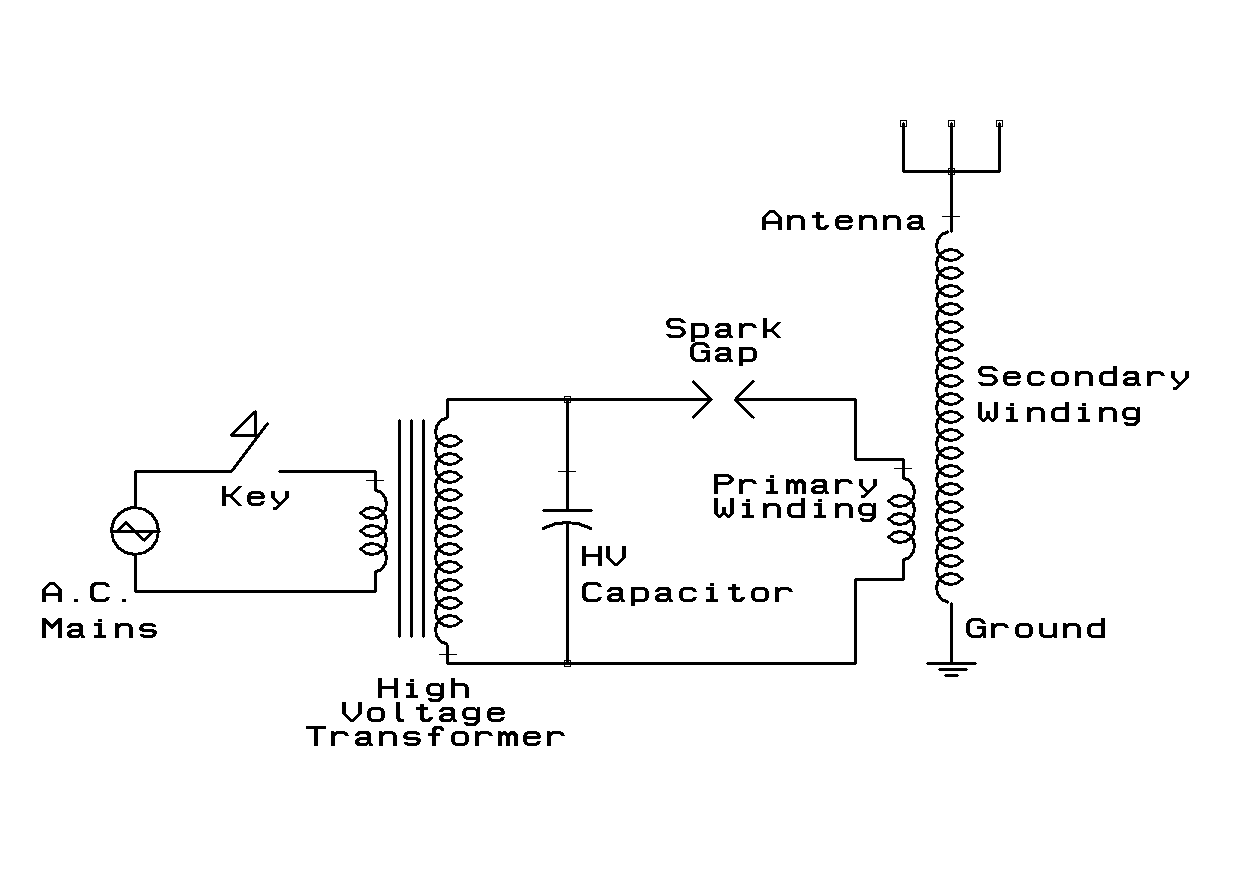
A spark-gap transmitter for generating radio frequency electromagnetic waves. Such devices served as the transmitters for most early wireless systems.

- 24 December 1906: Reginald Fessenden uses an Alexanderson alternator and rotary spark-gap transmitter to make the first radio audio broadcast, from Brant Rock, Massachusetts. Ships at sea heard a broadcast that included Fessenden playing O Holy Night on the violin and reading a passage from the Bible.
- 31 December 1906: Lee de Forest experiments with a "continuous wave" arc converter to transmit audio amplitude modulated (AM) audio across a lab room.
- February 1907: de Forest transmits electronic telharmonium music from his laboratory station in New York City.
- July 1907: de Forest makes ship-to-shore transmissions by radiotelephone—race reports— at a regatta held on Lake Erie.
- 1907: Marconi established the first permanent transatlantic wireless service from Clifden, Ireland to Glace Bay, Nova Scotia.
- 1909: Marconi and Karl Ferdinand Braun were awarded the Nobel Prize in Physics for "contributions to the development of wireless telegraphy".
- 1910: The Wireless Ship Act was passed by the United States Congress, requiring all ships of the United States traveling over two-hundred miles off the coast and carrying over fifty passengers to be equipped with wireless radio equipment with a range of one-hundred miles. The legislation was prompted by a shipping accident in 1909, where a single wireless operator saved the lives of 1200 people.
- June 23, 1910: Charles David Herrold, an electronics instructor in San Jose, California uses high-frequency spark gap technology to transmit audio "wireless phone concerts to local amateur wireless men".
- April 1912: The RMS Titanic sank. While in distress, it contacted several other ships via wireless. After this, wireless telegraphy using spark-gap transmitters quickly became universal on large ships. The Radio Act of 1912 required all seafaring vessels to maintain 24-hour radio watch and keep in contact with nearby ships and coastal radio stations.
- July 1912: Charles David Herrold, using a Poulsen arc transmitter, makes intermittent weekly radio broadcasts of phonograph records to the San Jose area. They were ended, and the transmitter was dismantled, when the United States entered World War I in 1917.
- 1913: Marconi initiated duplex transatlantic wireless communication between North America and Europe for the first time, using receiver stations in Letterfrack Ireland, and Louisbourg, Nova Scotia.
- 1913: The International Convention for the Safety of Life at Sea was convened and produced a treaty requiring shipboard radio stations to be staffed 24 hours a day. A typical high-power spark gap was a rotating commutator with six to twelve contacts per wheel, nine inches to a foot wide, driven by about 2000 volts DC. As the gaps made and broke contact, the radio wave was audible as a tone in a crystal set. The telegraph key often directly made and broke the 2000 volt supply. One side of the spark gap was directly connected to the antenna. Receivers with thermionic valves became commonplace before spark-gap transmitters were replaced by continuous wave transmitters.

== Audio broadcasting (1915 to 1950s) ==
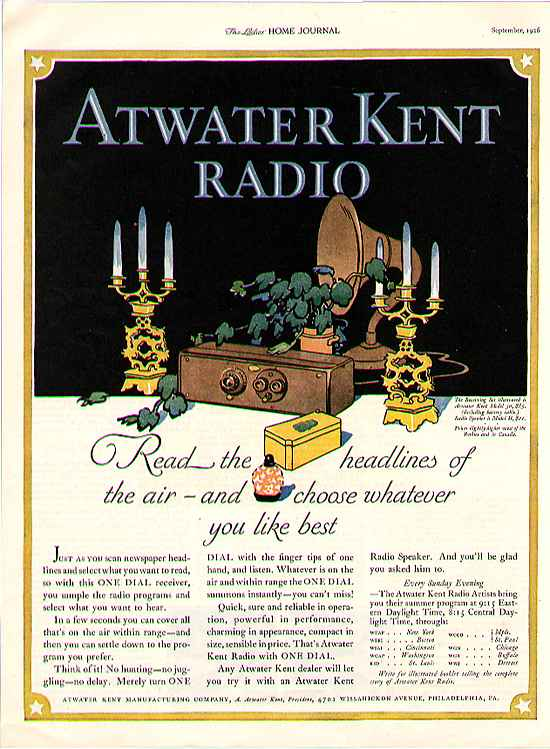
Ad for an Atwater Kent radio receiver in the Ladies' Home Journal (September, 1926)

- 1916: First regular broadcasts on 9XM (now WHA) – Wisconsin state weather, delivered in Morse Code
- 1919: First clear transmission of human speech, (on 9XM) after experiments with voice (1918) and music (1917).
- 1920: Regular wireless broadcasts for entertainment began in Argentina, pioneered by the group around Enrique Telémaco Susini.
- 1920: Spark-gap telegraphy stopped.
- 20 August 1920: E.W. Scripps's WWJ in Detroit received its commercial broadcasting license and started broadcasting. It has carried a regular schedule of programming to the present. Broadcasting was not yet supported by advertising. The stations owned by manufacturers and department stores were established to sell radios and those owned by newspapers to sell papers and express the opinions of the owners.
- 31 August 1920: The first known radio news program was broadcast by station 8MK, the unlicensed predecessor of WWJ (AM) in Detroit, Michigan.
- October 1920: Westinghouse in Pittsburgh, Pennsylvania became the first US commercial broadcasting station to be licensed when it was granted call letters KDKA. (Their engineer Frank Conrad had been broadcasting from his own station since 1916.)
- 2 November 1920: KDKA made America's first commercial broadcast, which was the 34th quadrennial presidential election.
- 1921: In Australia, Charles Maclurcan of 2CM commenced broadcasting Sunday night classical music concerts on the long wave band (214 kHz.), using seven watts. 2CM was issued with the first broadcasting licence in Australia (Licence No.1, signed by Prime Minister William Morris (Billy) Hughes,) in December 1922. However, many current historians recognize 2SB as the first official broadcaster in Australia, in 1923.
- 26 February 1922: In California, Joseph Franklin Rutherford transmitted his first radio Bible sermon.
- 1922: Regular wireless broadcasts for entertainment began in the UK from the Marconi Research Centre at Writtle near Chelmsford, England. Early radios ran the entire power of the transmitter through a carbon microphone.
- 23 November 1923: 2SB was the first Australian station to be officially recognised.
- 16 November 1924: first regular broadcast of Ukrainian Radio. December 1924: starting of regular broadcast in Russia.
- 23 May 1925: First broadcast in Tbilisi, Georgia.
- 1 November 1925: First broadcast in Riga, Latvia.
- 1 December 1925: First broadcast in Budapest, Hungary.
- Mid 1920s:
  - Amplifying vacuum tubes revolutionized radio receivers and transmitters; Westinghouse engineers improved them. (Before that, the most common type of receiver was the crystal set, although some early radios used some type of amplification through electric current or battery.)
  - Inventions of the triode amplifier, generator, and detector enabled audio radio.
  - Westinghouse buys DeForest's and Armstrong's patent.
- 1920s: Radio was first used to transmit pictures visible as television.
- 1926: Official Egyptian decree to regulate radio transmission stations and radio receivers.
- Early 1930s: Single sideband (SSB) and frequency modulation (FM) were invented by amateur radio operators. By 1940, they were established commercial modes.
- 1934: Egyptian government inaugurated the Egyptian State Radio Station (ESB)
- (Date needed): Westinghouse was brought into the patent allies group, General Electric, American Telephone and Telegraph, and Radio Corporation of America, and became a part owner of RCA. All radios made by GE and Westinghouse were sold under the RCA label 60% GE and 40% Westinghouse. ATT's Western Electric would build radio transmitters. The patent allies attempted to set up a monopoly, but they failed due to successful competition. Much to the dismay of the patent allies, several of the contracts for inventor's patents held clauses protecting "amateurs" and allowing them to use the patents. Whether the competing manufacturers were really amateurs was ignored by these competitors.
- 1933: FM radio was patented; Edwin H. Armstrong invented it. FM uses frequency modulation of the radio wave to minimize static and interference from electrical equipment and the atmosphere, in the audio program.
- 1937: W1XOJ, the first experimental FM radio station after Armstrong's W2XMN, was granted a construction permit by the U.S. Federal Communications Commission (FCC).
- 1940s: Standard analog television transmissions started in North America and Europe.
- 1943: the Supreme Court of the United States, in a case on radio patents involving the U.S. government vs the Marconi Company, restores some of the prior patents of Oliver Lodge, John Stone Stone, and Nicola Tesla. The decision was not about Marconi's original radio patents and the court declared that their decision had no bearing on Marconi's claim as the first to achieve radio communication, just that since Marconi's claim to certain patents were questionable, he could not claim infringement on those same patents (there are claims the decision may have let the U.S. government avoid paying damages that the Marconi Company was claiming for use of its patents during World War I via simply restoring the non-Marconi prior patent).
- After World War II: The FM radio broadcast was introduced in Germany.
- 1948: A new wavelength plan was set up for Europe at a meeting in Copenhagen. Because of the recent war, Germany (which was not even invited) was only given a few medium-wave frequencies, which are not very good for broadcasting. For this reason Germany began broadcasting on USW, "ultra short wave" (nowadays called VHF). After some amplitude modulation experience with VHF, it was realized that FM radio was a much better alternative for VHF radio than AM.

== Later 20th-century developments ==
- 1954: Regency introduced a pocket transistor radio, the TR-1, powered by a "standard 22.5V Battery".
- 1960: Sony introduced their first transistorized radio, small enough to fit in a vest pocket, and able to be powered by a small battery. It was durable, because there were no tubes to burn out. Over the next twenty years, transistors displaced tubes almost completely except for very high power or very high frequency uses.
- Early 1960s: VOR systems finally became widespread; before that, aircraft used commercial AM radio stations for navigation. (AM stations are still marked on U.S. aviation charts).
- 1963: Color television was commercially transmitted, and the first (radio) communication satellite, TELSTAR, was launched.
- In the late 1960s, the U.S. long-distance telephone network began to convert to a digital network, employing digital radios for many of its links.
- 1970s: LORAN became the premier radio navigation system. Soon, the U.S. Navy experimented with satellite navigation.
- 1987: The GPS constellation of satellites was launched.
- Early 1990s: Amateur radio experimenters began to use personal computers with audio cards to process radio signals.
- 1994: The U.S. Army and DARPA launched an aggressive successful project to construct a software radio that could become a different radio on the fly by changing software.
- Late 1990s: The digital transmissions began to be applied to broadcasting.

=== Telex on radio ===
Telegraphy did not go away on radio. Instead, the degree of automation increased. On land-lines in the 1930s, Teletypewriters automated encoding, and were adapted to pulse-code dialing to automate routing, a service called telex. For thirty years, telex was the absolute cheapest form of long-distance communication, because up to 25 telex channels could occupy the same bandwidth as one voice channel. For business and government, it was an advantage that telex directly produced written documents.

Telex systems were adapted to short-wave radio by sending tones over single sideband. CCITT R.44 (the most advanced pure-telex standard) incorporated character-level error detection and retransmission as well as automated encoding and routing. For many years, telex-on-radio (TOR) was the only reliable way to reach some third-world countries. TOR remains reliable, though less-expensive forms of e-mail are displacing it. Many national telecom companies historically ran nearly pure telex networks for their governments, and they ran many of these links over short wave radio.

== See also ==
- History of radio
- Timeline of the introduction of radio in countries
- History of broadcasting
- List of oldest radio stations
- List of radios – List of specific models of radios
- History of broadcasting in Australia
- Timeline of Australian radio
- Broadcasting in the United States

== Cited sources ==
- Carlson, W. Bernard (2003). Innovation as a Social Process: Elihu Thomson and the Rise of General Electric. Cambridge University Press. ISBN 9780521533126.
- Carlson, W. Bernard (2013). Tesla: Inventor of the Electrical Age. Princeton University Press. ISBN 978-1400846559.
- Lindell, L. V. (2006). "Wireless before Marconi". In T. K. Sarkar; Robert Mailloux; Arthur A. Oliner; M. Salazar-Palma; Dipak L. Sengupta (eds.). History of Wireless. John Wiley & Sons. ISBN 9780471783015.
