= Timeline of the introduction of radio in countries =

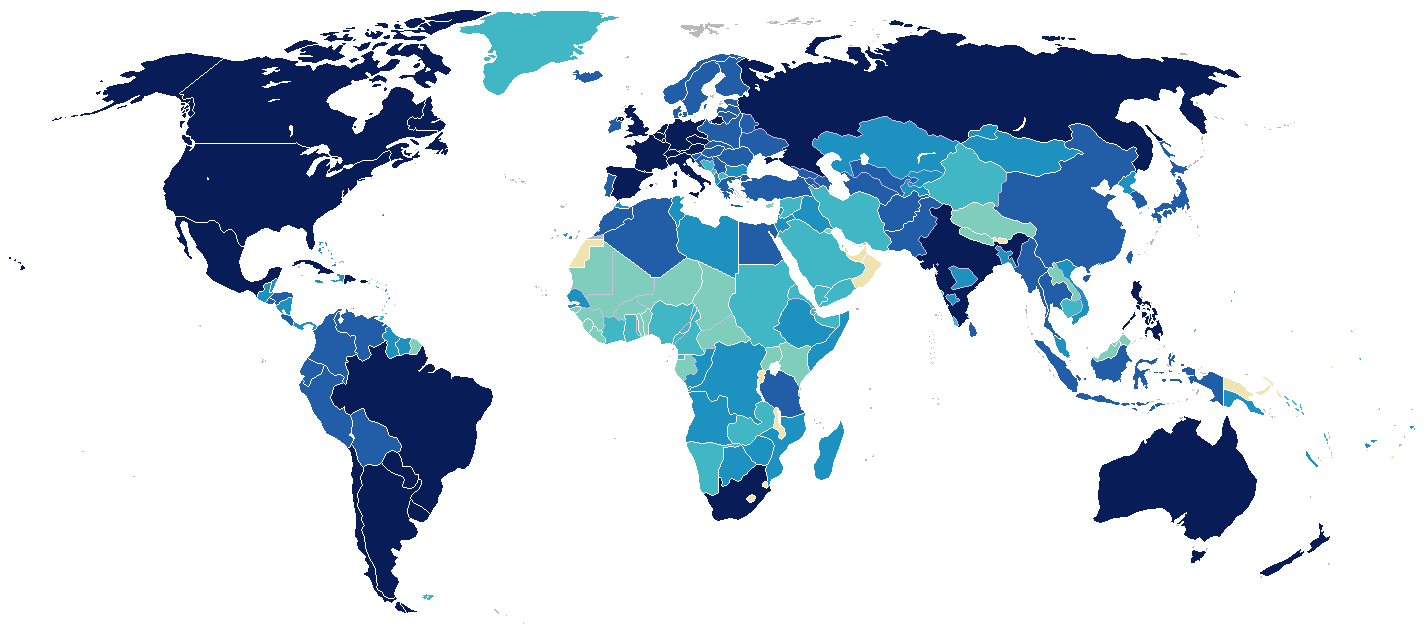
A map showing when radio broadcasting was introduced in each country. 1920s, 1st half, or earlier (33) 1920s, 2nd half (53) 1930s (56) 1940s (35) 1950s (27) 1960s or later (17) No data

This is a list of when the first radio broadcasts to the public occurred in the mentioned countries and territories. Non-public field tests and closed circuit demonstrations are not referred to; neither are license dates or dates of the official opening.

Basis for each entry is the time of introduction. Listed are independent countries, dependent territories and territories within a country only if they became independent later or if it is a large country and there is a vast time difference with the introduction in different parts.

Each entry comprises: the flag linked to the country or territory, the name of the country or territory and, in parentheses, the designation of the radio station (either by call sign or by name, linked to a main article), its city and some additional information.

== History ==
=== 1910s and 1920s ===
Year	Countries and territories
1916	United States (2XG New York City; 8MK Detroit > WWJ & 8XK Pittsburgh > KDKA 1920)
1919	Netherlands (PCGG The Hague; HDO Hilversum 1923)
1920	Argentina (LOR Buenos Aires), Canada (XWA Montreal > 9AM > CFCF)
1921	Australia (2CM Sydney), France (R. Tour Eiffel, Paris), Mexico (TND Monterrey)
1922	Brazil (SPE Rio de Janeiro), Cuba (2LC Havana, followed by PWX), New Zealand (R. Dunedin > 4AB), Paraguay (CXZ-27 Asunción; ZP1 1926), Philippines (KZKZ Manila), Puerto Rico (WKAQ San Juan), United Kingdom (2MT Writtle; 2LO London), Uruguay (CW90A R. Paradizábal, Montevideo; CWOA 1927), Victoria (R. Melbourne)
1923	Belgium (R. Bruxelles), Chile (CBC R. Chilena Santiago), Czechoslovakia (Radiojournal, Prague), Germany (Funk-Stunde, Berlin), British Raj (2FV R. Club Bombay > IBC 1927), Shanghai (XRO Shanghai), South Africa (JB Johannesburg), Switzerland (2HB Lausanne)
1924	Austria (RAVAG, Vienna), Dominican Republic (HIH Santo Domingo; HIX 1928), Italy (IRO Rome URI), Luxemburg (R. Luxembourg), Newfoundland (8WMC St. John's > VOWR), Singapore (1SE AWSM > ZHI 1933), Soviet Union (Moscow: RA1 Komintern, RA2 MGSPS), Spain (EAJ2 Madrid, EAJ1 Barcelona), (Kingdom of Yugoslavia) YU: Serbia (R. Belgrade; Rakovica 1924), South Australia (R. Adelaide)
1925	Afghanistan (R. Kabul), Algeria (8DB Algiers), Byelorussian SSR (RA18 Minsk), (British Ceylon) Ceylon (Colombo R.), Denmark (Statsradiofonien, Copenhagen), Dutch East Indies (BRX, Batavia > NIROM), Hungary (Magyar Telefonhírmondó és Rádió Rt., Budapest; wired Hírmondó 1893), Japan (JOAK Tokyo), Kwantung (JQAK Dairen), Latvia (Radiofon Riga), Norway (Kringkastingsselskapet, Oslo), Peru (OAX Lima), Portugal (P1AA Lisbon), Sweden (Radiotjänst, Stockholm), Ukrainian SSR (RA21 Kharkov), Western Australia (R. Perth)
1926	Armenian SSR (RA49 Yerevan), Azerbaijan SSR (RA45 Baku), Burma (2HZ R. Club Rangoon), China (XOH Harbin; (Republic of China (1912–1949)) XKM Nanjing 1928; XNCR Yan'an 1940); (Czechoslovakia) CZ: Slovakia (Radiojournal, Bratislava), Danzig (Landessender Danzig), Egypt (R. Farouk et al., Cairo), El Salvador (AQM San Salvador), Estonia (R. Ringhääling, Tallinn), Finland (Yle, Helsinki; 3NB Tampere 1924), Georgian SSR (RA27 Tbilisi), Iceland (H.f. Útvarp, Reykjavík), Ireland (2RN Dublin), Lithuania (Lietuvos radijas, Kaunas), Poland (Polskie R., Warsaw), Venezuela (AYRE Caracas), (Kingdom of Yugoslavia) YU: Croatia (R. Zagreb)
1927	Bolivia (CPX La Paz; CP1AA 1922), Costa Rica (TI4NRH Heredia), Kenya (VQ7LO Nairobi), Korea, South (JODK Keijo), Turkey (İstanbul Radyosu), Turkmen SSR (RA6 Ashgabat), Uzbek SSR (RA27 Tashkent)
1928	Greece (Thessaloniki; YRE 1938), Honduras (HRB La Voz del Trópico, Tegucigalpa), Hong Kong (GOW), Morocco (R. Maroc), Pakistan (YMCA, Lahore; Karachi 1926), Rumania (R. Bukarest), Taiwan under Japanese rule (JFAK Taihoku), Thailand (4PJ Bangkok), VT: Tonkin (R. Sindex, Haiphong), (Kingdom of Yugoslavia) YU: Slovenia (R. Ljubljana), Tasmania (R. Hobart), Baja California (XEY/R. Mexicali)
1929	Colombia (HJN Bogotá), Ecuador (El Prado, Riobamba), (France) Réunion (R. Saint-Denis), Queensland (R. Brisbane)

=== 1930s ===
Year	Countries and territories
1930	Bermuda (TJW Hamilton), Bulgaria (Rodno R., Sofia), Guatemala (TGW La Voz de Guatemala, Guatemala City), Malaysia (KLAWS, Kuala Lumpur), (France) Saint Pierre and Miquelon (R. Club), Tunisia (Tunis Kasbah), VT: Cochinchina (FZS Saigon), Australia (Australian Capital Territory (R. Canberra))
1931	Kazakh ASSR (RV60 Alma-Ata), Madagascar (R. Tananarive), Samoa (5ZA Apia), Tajik SSR (RV47 Stalinabad), Vatican City (Vatican R.), Puebla (XHTM/R. Puebla)
1932	Southern Rhodesia (ZEA Salisbury), Nord (FBKI R. Lille)
1933	(Colony of Curaçao and Dependencies) Curaçao (CUROM Willemstad), (Portugal) Macau (CQN/CRY-9), (Portugal) Mozambique (LM Radio, Lourenço Marques), Panama (HPJ5 R. Tembleque, Panama City), Spanish Morocco (EAJ-21 Melilla)
1934	(French Third Republic) French Polynesia (FO8AA R. Club Oceanien, Papeete), Lebanon (R. East), Mongolia (R. Ulaanbaatar), Nicaragua (YNLF Managua), Tenerife (EAJ-43 R. Club Tenerife, Santa Cruz), Australia (Northern Territory (R. Darwin))
1935	British Guiana (VP3BG Georgetown > ZFY), (Dutch East Indies) Dutch Guiana (AVROS, Paramaribo), Ethiopia (R. Addis Ababa), Fiji (ZJV Suva), (French Third Republic) French Equatorial Africa [AEF]/Congo (R. Club Brazzaville), Haiti (HHK Port-au-Prince), Hyderabad (VUV Deccan R.), Leeward Islands (VP2LO Caribbean Broadcasting Service, Basseterre > ZIZ), Malta (Radju Malta, Valletta), Mysore (VU7MC Ākāśavāṇī), Papua (4PM Port Moresby)
1936	Bahamas (ZNS Nassau), Botswana (ZNB Mafeking), Iraq (R. Baghdad), Korea, North (JBBK Heijō), Las Palmas (EAJ-50 R. Las Palmas), Palestine (PBS, Jerusalem/Ramallah), Tyva (R. Kyzyl), Saint Vincent and the Grenadines (R. Kingstown, Kingstown)
1937	(Portugal) Angola (CR6AA Lobito), Belgian Congo (OQ2AA R. Léo, Léopoldville), British Honduras (ZIK-2 Belize), (French Third Republic) Guadeloupe (R. Guadeloupe), Martinique (R. Martinique), (French Third Republic) New Caledonia (FK8AA Nouméa)
1938	Albania (R. Tirana), Kirghiz SSR (RV6 Frunze; wired earlier), Libya (ITR Tripoli), Liechtenstein (R. Liechtenstein), Saint Lucia (R. Castries), Madras Presidency (All India Radio, Chennai), Italian East Africa (R. Mogadiscio, wired and experimental 1951), Bas-Rhin (FBGT R. Strasbourg)
1939	Andorra (R. Andorra), Antigua and Barbuda (R. St. John's, Windward Islands), Bangladesh (All India Radio, Dhaka), Baroda (Baroda), (French Third Republic) French West Africa [AOF]/Senegal (R. AOF, Dakar), Jamaica (VP5PZ Kingston), Rhône (FBRF R. Lyon), (Russian Soviet Federative Socialist Republic) Kaliningrad Oblast (R. Kaliningrad)

=== 1940s ===
Year	Countries and territories
1940	Bahrain (R. Bahrain > Arabic 1955), Gold Coast (ZOY Accra; wired 1935), Iran (R. Tehran), Aden South Yemen (ZNR Aden R. > 1954), (Anglo-Egyptian Sudan) Sudan (R. Omdurman)
1941	(France) AEF: French Cameroons (R. Douala), Northern Rhodesia (R. Lusaka), Palau (JRAK Koror), (East Turkestan) Xinjiang (R. Dihua; wired 1935), (Kingdom of Yugoslavia) YU: Macedonia (R. Skoplje), Cape Verde (R. Praia), Gironde (FBXE R. Bordeaux), Veneto (R. Veneto)
1942	American Samoa (WVUV Leone), Falkland Islands (Falklands R.), Greenland (Grønlands R., Godthåb), Syria (R. Damas)
1943	British Somaliland (R. Hargeisa), French Somaliland (R. Djibouti), Monaco (R. Monte Carlo), Travancore (Thiruvananthapuram), Tatar ASSR (R. Kazan), Crimean ASSR (R. Simfeopol)
1944	Gilbert and Ellice Islands (WXLF Tarawa), Guam (WXLI Agana), New Hebrides (WVUR Espiritu Santo), Solomon Islands (WVUQ Guadalcanal), Northern Mariana Islands (WXLD Saipan), (Democratic Federal Yugoslavia) YU: Montenegro (R. Cetinje), Sardinia (R. Sardinia)
1945	(Democratic Federal Yugoslavia) YU: Bosnia and Herzegovina (R. Sarajevo), (Democratic Federal Yugoslavia) YU: Kosovo (R. Pristina), (North Vietnam) YU: Vietnam (Voice of Vietnam), Haute-Garonne (FBGJ R. Toulouse)
1946	Cambodia (R. Cambodge), Spanish Guinea (R. Atlántica, Fernando Póo), Yemen (Sana'a R. > 1955), Marshall Islands (R. Majuro), Puy-de-Dôme (FBKU R. Clermont-Ferrand), Umbria (R. Umbria)
1947	Portuguese Guinea (CMQ Bissau), Trinidad and Tobago (R. Trinidad, Port of Spain), Federated States of Micronesia (R. Palikir; wired 1939), Ille-et-Vilaine (FBWP R. Rennes), Tuscany (R. Tuscany)
1948	Portuguese India (R. Goa), Nigeria (R. Nigeria; wired 1935), Cher (FBTF R. Bourges)
1949	(France) AOF: Ivory Coast (R. Abidjan), South West Africa (SABC via sw), Saudi Arabia (R. Mecca, Jeddah), Karakalpak ASSR Karakalpak Autonomous Soviet Socialist Republic (R. Nukus), Calvados (FBGQ R. Caen)

=== 1950s ===
Year	Countries and territories
1950	Liberia (ELBC Monrovia), Tibet (R. Lhasa), U.S. Virgin Islands (WSTA Charlotte Amalie), Loire-Atlantique (FBJL R. Nantes), (Russian Soviet Federative Socialist Republic) Sakhalin Oblast (R. Yuzhno-Sakhalinsk)
1951	(France) French Guiana (R. Cayenne), Italian Somaliland (R. Mogadishu; wired 1938), Kuwait (R. Kuwait), Laos (RNL, Vientiane), Nepal (R. Nepal, Kathmandu), Tanganyika (Sauti ya Dar es Salaam), Zanzibar (Sauti ya Unguja)
1952	Sarthe (FBYF R. Le Mans)
1953	Cyprus (CyBS, Nicosia; BBC 1948), (France) AOF: French Dahomey (R. Cotonou), (France) AOF: French Guinea (R. Conakry), AOF: French Togoland (R. Lomé), Friuli-Venezia Giulia (R. Friuli-Venezia Giulia)
1954	Sarawak (R. Sarawak, Kuching), Windward Islands (WIBS, St. George's, Grenada), Calabria (R. Calabria)
1955	(France) AEF: Chad (R. Tchad, Fort Lamy), North Borneo (R. Sabah, Jesselton), Sierra Leone (SLBS, Freetown; wired 1934), Alpes-Maritimes (FBVZ R. Nice)
1956	Jordan (Radio Jordan), Côte-d'Or (FBDO R. Dijon), Aruba (R. Oranjestad; wired 1937)
1957	Brunei (RTB), (France) AOF: French West Africa (R. Soudan, Bamako), (France) AOF: Mauritania (R. Mauritanie, Saint-Louis, Senegal), Chile (Easter Island (R. Hanga Roa)), Meurthe-et-Moselle (FBNH R. Nancy)
1958	(France) AEF: Ubangi-Shari (R. Bangui), Gibraltar (R. Gibraltar), AOF: Niger (R. Niger, Niamey), Uganda (UBS, Kampala), Haute-Vienne (FBTG R. Limoges)
1959	AOF: Upper Volta (R. Haute Volta, Ouagadougou), AEF: Gabon (R. Gabon, Libreville), (South Korea) Jeju Island (R. Jeju, Jeju-si), Somme (FBSP R. Amiens)

=== 1960s ===
Year	Countries and territories
1960	New Guinea (VL9BR Rabaul), Ruanda-Urundi (R. Usumbura)
1961	(France) Comoros (R. Comores, Moroni), Spanish Sahara (EAJ-202/203 R. Sahara, El Aaiún), Tonga (ZCO Nukuʻalofa), Antarctica ( (United States) McMurdo Station (R. McMurdo))
1962	Gambia (R. Gambia, Bakau), Maldives (Malé R.)
1963	Barbados (R. Barbados; wired 1935), Tristan da Cunha (R. Edinburgh of the Seven Seas)
1964	Lesotho (R. Lesotho, Maseru), Malawi (MBC, Blantyre), Pohnpei (R. Kolonia)
1965	(United Kingdom) Swaziland (SBS, Mbabane), Trucial States (Voice of the Coast, Sharjah)
1966	Kosovo (R. Pristina; wired 1945)
1967	(United Kingdom) Saint Helena (Radio Saint Helena), Sabah (R. Kota Kinabalu)
1968	Nauru (NBS), (Georgian Soviet Socialist Republic) Abkhaz ASSR (Radio Sokhumi)
1969	Anguilla (R. Anguilla, The Valley), (Turkey) Northern Cyprus (North Nicosia Radio)

=== 1970s ===
Year	Countries and territories
1970	Oman (R. Sultanate of Oman, Muscat), (Portugal) Azores (R. Ponta Delgada)
1971	Corsica (R. Corsica, Corsica), Venda (R. Thohoyandou)
1972	Saint Barthélemy (R. Gustavia), Nakhichevan ASSR (R. Nakhchivan)
1973	Bhutan (Radio NYAB, Thimphu), Chuuk (Radio Weno)
1974	Niue (R. Alofi), Transkei (R. Umtata)
1975	Tuvalu (Radio Tuvalu), KwaZulu (R. Pietermaritzburg)
1976	Bophuthatswana (R. Mamabatho, shutdown 1993)
1977	Yap (R. Colonia)
1978	(Socialist Federal Republic of Yugoslavia) YU: Republika Srpska (R. Sarajevo, wired 1945)
1979	German-speaking Community (German Speaking Radio), Ciskei (R. Bisho)

=== 1980s ===
Year	Countries and territories
1980	Ceuta (R. Ceuta), Lebowa (R. Lebowa)
1981	Transnistria (R. Tiraspol), KaNgwane (R. Louieville)
1982	Melilla (R. Melilla), Gazankulu (R. Giyani), Kosrae (R. Tofol)
1983	Eritrea (Radio Asmara, Asmara), Gagauzia (R. Comrat)
1984	Norfolk Island (Radio Norfolk Island, Kingston), QwaQwa (R. Phuthaditjhaba)
1985	(Azerbaijan Soviet Socialist Republic) Nagorno-Karabakh Autonomous Oblast (R. Stepanakert)
1986	South Ossetia (R. Tskhinvali)
1987	Akrotiri and Dhekelia (R. Akrotiri and R. Dhekelia), Sint Maarten (R. Philipsburg)
1988	Federation of Bosnia and Herzegovina (R. Sarajevo, wired 1945)
1989	Montserrat (R. Plymouth)

=== 1990s ===
Year	Countries and territories
1990	Peru (National Hispanic Radio FM)
1992	Tokelau (R. Nukunonu)
1993	San Marino (R. San Marino)
1994	Collectivity of Saint Martin (R. Marigot)
1995	Somaliland (R. Hargeisa; wired 1944)
1996	Saba Department (R. The Bottom)
1997	(Morocco) Southern Provinces (R. Laayoune)
1999	Pitcairn Islands (R. Adamstown)

=== 2000s ===
Year	Countries and territories
2000	Netherlands (Bonaire (R. Kralendijk))
2002	Cocos (Keeling) Islands (R. West Island)
2004	South Sudan (R. Juba)
2005	Clipperton Island (R. Clipperton)
2006	Donetsk People's Republic (R. Donetsk), Solomon Islands (Buala Isabel Learning Network)
2007	Luhansk People's Republic (R. Luhansk), Solomon Islands (Kolotubi Isabel Learning Network)
2008	Sint Eustatius (R. Oranjestad), Solomon Islands (Tataba Isabel Learning Network)
2009	Vanuatu (Toruba Radio), Solomon Islands (Lelegia Isabel Learning Network)

=== 2010s ===
Year	Countries and territories
2012	Chinland (R. Chinland)
2015	Puntland (R. Puntland)
2022	British Antarctic Territory (BFBS Antarctica)

== See also ==
- History of radio
- Table of years in radio
- List of oldest radio stations
- Timeline of the introduction of television in countries

== Bibliography ==
- Blin, Bernard. Milestones in radio: the first half century (1895–1945). The UNESCO courier (February 1997), p. 16–21
- Radio Review/Radio Listeners Guide (1925–1929), Broadcasting Yearbook (1935–2010), World Radio TV Handbook (1947–)
- Berg, Jerome S. The early shortwave stations: a broadcasting history through 1945 (2013)
- radioheritage.net
- worldradiomap.com (Europe, Americas, Asia, Oceania)
- Europe: Broadcasting abroad (1934); The media in Europe at Google Books (2004)
- Africa: Head, Sydney W. Broadcasting in Africa: a continental survey of radio and television at Google Books (1974); Ziegler, Dhyana. Thunder and silence: the mass media in Africa, p. 160–182, at Google Books (1992)
- Arab world: Boyd, Douglas A. Broadcasting in the Arab world: a survey of radio and television in the Middle East at Google Books (1982)
- Asia: Sterling, Christopher H. Encyclopedia of radio. Asia (2004); Luthra, H. R. Indian broadcasting at Google Books (1986); McDaniel, Drew O. Broadcasting in the Malay world: radio, television, and video in Brunei, Indonesia, Malaysia, and Singapore at Google Books (1994)
