= List of oldest radio stations =

It is generally recognized that the first radio transmission was made from a temporary station set up by Guglielmo Marconi in 1895. This followed on from pioneering work in the field by a number of people including Alessandro Volta, André-Marie Ampère, Georg Ohm and James Clerk Maxwell.

The several potential contenders for the title of "oldest radio station" are listed below, organized by sign-on date. These are not restricted to radio broadcasting, i.e., the transmissions were not necessarily intended to reach a wide audience.

== Stations ==
=== AM on mediumwave and longwave ===
Experimental and early radio stations (AM on mediumwave and longwave)
Station call-sign (original)	Station call-sign (current)	City/location	On air	Transmission frequency (AM radio / FM radio)	Broadcast class
Roberto Landell de Moura	N/A	São Paulo (between Paulista Avenue and Alto de Santana)	1893 demonstration, which may have actually been optical transmission instead of radio		
Guglielmo Marconi	N/A	Broadcast across his garden in Pontecchio, Italy.	1895		Experimental
(Professor William Henry Bragg of the University of Adelaide, potentially in conjunction with G.W. Selby of Melbourne)	N/A		1897		Experimental. Disputed in some sources.
Guglielmo Marconi, first trans-Atlantic transmission.	N/A	from Poldhu, Cornwall to Signal Hill, St. John's, Newfoundland.	December 1901		Experimental
(First official Morse Code transmission in Australia)	N/A	from Queenscliff, Victoria to Devonport, Tasmania	1906		Experimental
(Reginald Fessenden experimental alternator station)	BO	Brant Rock, Massachusetts, United States	December 21, 1906 (Audio tests from various locations from as early as 1900)	AM 50 kHz (approximately)	? W
Lee de Forest (laboratory in the Parker Building)	[?]	New York City, New York, United States	1907	AM ? kHz (approximately)	? W
(Beloit College Professor Dr. Charles Aaron Culver)	[WBCR, WBNB, WEBW]	Beloit, Wisconsin, United States	1907	AM ? kHz (approximately) now airs on 90.3 FM.	? W
FN/SJN/6XF/6XE/KQW/"San Jose"	KCBS	San Jose, California/San Francisco, California	1909, 1921 (officially granted experimental license as KQW, become commercial in 1921, and KCBS in 1949)	AM 740 kHz (Originally used 15 watts modulated with Carbon microphone)	Class-B
XWA	CINW	Montreal, Quebec, Canada	August 1914 – December 1, 1919 – May 1922 – January 29, 2010	AM 940 kHz (Not original frequency). Considered by many Canadians to be "First scheduled broadcast station;" prior call sign CFCF stood for Canada's First, Canada's Finest.	Class-A (Clear channel); XWA Experimental and W/T School station licence starting end of 1914, regular broadcasting test emissions starting December 1, 1919, with XWA being replaced in May 1922 by private commercial broadcasting licence CFCF; AM station CINW ceased operations on January 29, 2010.
2YU	WRUC	Union College, Schenectady, New York	1915	Various Frequencies AM, switched in 1975 to 90.9 FM, & moved in 1983 to 89.7 FM	Original: Technical & Training School License, Current: Class-A
2XI	WGY	Schenectady, New York	February 20, 1922	AM 810 kHz	Class-A
9ZP, 9CLS	KGFX	Pierre, South Dakota	1912	Various frequencies,	
2XG		New York City	1916	Unknown	Unknown (see also Lee de Forest [above].)
8XK, 8ZZ	KDKA	Pittsburgh, Pennsylvania	1916	AM 1020 kHz	75 watts (1916), Class-A (1920–present). Began simulcasting on shortwave in 1923 as 8XS.
Irish rebel station	none	General Post Office, Sackville Street, Dublin, Ireland	April 24, 1916	Morse code only (Despite this claimed by some to be "world's first broadcast" as transmission not aimed at specific target)	converted ship transmitter
9XM	WHA	University of Wisconsin–Madison, Madison, Wisconsin	December 4, 1916 (regular Morse code weather broadcasts; first voice broadcast in February 1919; regular programming January 1921)	AM 970 kHz	Class-B
First direct communication Australia to the United Kingdom	N/A	AWA; Ernest Fisk; Sydney	1918	AM 21 kHz	
7AC/7XC	KJR	Seattle, WA, USA	1919	AM 833 kHz/619 kHz, then various frequencies; currently AM 950 kHz & FM 102.9 MHz	
Rádio Clube de Pernambuco	same name as well	Recife, Pernambuco,	1919	AM 720 kHz	Made the first radiophonic broadcast in Brazil
First Australian experiment in the broadcast of music	N/A	AWA; Ernest Fisk; Sydney	August 8, 1919	AM	
Doubleday-Hill radio department station	KQV	Pittsburgh, Pennsylvania	November 19, 1919	Currently AM 1410 kHz	Currently Class D
(Experimental Czech tests)	Petřínská rozhledna (Petřín Lookout Tower), Prague, Czechoslovakia	October 28, 1919 (Experimental)	May 20, 1920	AM ??? kHz	?? kW
2MT (Marconi experimental station with a regular news service)		Writtle, Chelmsford, Essex, England	February 23, 1920	AM 107 kHz	15 kW
LOR Radio Argentina	LOR	Buenos Aires, Argentina	August 27, 1920 Continued daily commercial broadcast up to 1997	AM 857 kHz	5 Watts initially, 500 Watts by 1921
6ADZ	KNX	Los Angeles, California	Summer 1920, granted broadcasting station license 1921	AM 1070 kHz	Class-A
8MK	WWJ	Detroit, Michigan	August 29, 1920	AM 950 kHz	Class-B
KDKA	same as original	Pittsburgh, Pennsylvania	November 2, 1920 (Aired as 8ZZ that night)	AM 1020 kHz	Class-A (Clear channel)
9AH		Toronto, Canada	18 April 1921 (as 9AH); 18 April 1922 (as CKCE) - closed September 1924	450 meters	Licensed to Canadian Independent Telephone Company of Toronto (CITCO), initially as experimental license for wireless telephony.
9YK	WEW	St. Louis, Missouri	21 April 1921 (as 9YK); 23 March 1922 (as WEW)	AM 770 kHz	Class-D
WRR	KTCK	Dallas, Texas	4 August 1921 (broadcasts date back to 1920)	AM 1310 kHz	
WBZ	same as original	Boston, Massachusetts	19 September 1921	AM 1030 kHz	Class-A (Clear channel)
XEH-AM	same as original	San Nicolás de los Garza, Nuevo León	9 October 1921	AM 1420 kHz	Class-B
KYW	same as original	Chicago, Illinois (1921); Philadelphia, Pennsylvania (1934); Cleveland, Ohio (1956); Philadelphia, Pennsylvania (1965)	11 November 1921	AM 560 kHz, 570 kHz, 1020 kHz (Chicago); AM 1020 kHz (Philadelphia); AM 1100 kHz (Cleveland)); AM 1060 kHz (Philadelphia)	Class-A (Clear channel)
Experimental broadcasts by Professor Robert Jack of Otago University	4XD	Dunedin, New Zealand	17 November 1921	experimental	New Zealand's first regular broadcasts of voice and music
2CM		Charles Maclurcan; Sydney	1921	AM 214 kHz	Australia's first experimental station
Radio Journal de la Tour Eiffel (Eiffel Tower Newsreel)	France Inter	Paris, France	1921	"Long wave" 115 kHz (2600 m)	N/A
WCAT		Rapid City, South Dakota	1922	AM 618 kHz (1922–?); AM 1200 kHz 1928–1941; AM 1230 kHz 1941–1952	
9-BC, 9-XR, 9-BY, WOC	WOC	Davenport, Iowa	1922	1420 kHz (1942–present)	Class-B
WLB	KUOM	Saint Paul, Minnesota	13 January 1922	AM 770 kHz	Class-D
WHN	WEPN	Ridgewood, New York	February 1922, some sources cite 18 March 1922	AM 833 kHz	Class-A
KLZ	same as original	Denver, Colorado	10 March 1922	AM 560 kHZ	www.KLZradio.com, Colorado's First Station, Class-B
WSB	same as original	Atlanta, Georgia	15 March 1922	Originally on 360 meters (AM 833 kHz), moved across the dial and eventually assigned to AM 750 kHz following the NARBA treaties	Class-A (Clear channel)
WIP	WTEL	Philadelphia, Pennsylvania	17 March 1922	AM 610 kHz	Class-B
WLW	WLW	Cincinnati, Ohio	23 March 1922	AM 700 kHz	Class-A (Clear channel)
WWL	same as original	New Orleans, Louisiana	31 March 1922	AM 870 kHz	Class A
WGU	WSCR	Chicago, Illinois	13 April 1922	Originally AM 833 kHz, became WMAQ at 750 kHz on 2 October 1922, moved to 670 kHz on 2 July 1923	Class-A
KHJ	KHJ	Los Angeles, California	13 April 1922	AM 720 kHz, founded by C.R. Kierulff & Co., sold to Times-Mirror Company in late 1922	Class-A
KFI	KFI	Los Angeles, California	16 April 1922	AM 640 kHz, founded by Earle C. Anthony	Class-A
4XD	WBT	Charlotte, North Carolina	18 December 1920, License granted 10 April 1922	AM 1110 kHz	Class-A
CKOC	CKOC	Hamilton, Ontario	1 May 1922	410 metres (1922–1925); AM 880 kHz (1925–1930); AM 1120 kHz (1930–1931); AM 630 kHz (1931–1933); AM 1120 kHz (1933–1941); AM 1150 kHz (1941—present)	Class B
KZN	KSL	Salt Lake City, Utah and vicinity	6 May 1922	AM 1160 kHz (1941–present)	Class A (Clear channel)
2LO	2LO	London, United Kingdom	11 May 1922 — 9 March 1930	1 hour daily tests on 350 metres (857 kHz) AM. Full service opened: 14 November 1922	
2ZY	2ZY	Manchester, United Kingdom	17 May 1922 — 9 March 1930	Test TXs: 350 metres (857 kHz) AM. Full service opened 15 November 1922: 375 meters	
CFCA	none	Toronto, Canada	22 June 1922 — 1 September 1933	Began testing on 450 metres on 10 April 1922, licensed for 400 metres beginning 22 June 2022. Moved to 770 kHz in 1928.	
KFBL	KRKO	Everett, Washington, USA	26 August 1922	AM 1380 kHz (1958–present)	Class B (Regional)
CKAC	same as original	Montreal, Quebec/Montreal, Québec, Canada	12 September 1922	AM 730 kHz	Class-A
DN	4XD	Dunedin, New Zealand	4 October 1922	originally AM 1431 kHz, now AM 1305 kHz and FM 99.8 MHz	
9BT	CFRC-FM	Kingston, Ontario, Canada	7 October 1922	450 metres (666 kHz) (ca.1923–1925), AM 1120 kHz (1925–1930), AM 930 kHz (1930–1933), AM 915 kHz (c. 1933), AM 1510 kHz (1933–1941), AM 1490 kHz (1941–1990); FM 91.9 MHz (1954–1990) (now FM 101.9 MHz)	Class-A
5IT	5IT	Birmingham, United Kingdom	15 November 1922 — 25 August 1927	Not known	
WNAX	same as original	Yankton, South Dakota	25 November 1922	AM 570 kHz	
WKAQ	same as original	San Juan, Puerto Rico	3 December 1922	AM 580 kHz	Class-B
Radio Ceylon	Sri Lanka Broadcasting Corporation	Colombo, Sri Lanka	1923 (experimental), 1925 (official launch) – present	"Long wave" 375 kHz	1500 W
WKBV; William Knox BrookVille	same as is	Richmond, Indiana; Whitewater Broadcasting	1923	AM 1000 kHz 24/7	Class B
CKUA	CKUA Radio Network	Edmonton, Alberta (broadcast province-wide)	1923	Originated as CFCK in 1923. Began airing University of Alberta lectures in 1925. Purchased by the university in 1927, becoming educational station CKUA on November 21. 500-watt (Original); AM 580 kHz (Edmonton); Various FM frequencies province-wide with first FM licence granted in 1947. FM only since 2013 when AM signal discontinued.	B
Radio Chilena (Chile Radio Company)	CB66	Santiago, Chile	October 1922 (experimental), 26 March 1923 (official launch) – 2005	AM 660 kHz	
PKX (Malabar Radio)	N/A	Bandung, Dutch East Indies (now Indonesia)	5 May 1923	Long wave	
Radiojournal	Český rozhlas Radiožurnál	Prague-Kbely, Czechoslovakia	18 May 1923	"Long wave" 292 kHz (1025 m)	
CYB "El Buen Tono"	XEB-AM (Instituto Mexicano de la Radio)	Mexico City, Mexico	23 September 1923	AM 1220 kHz	N/A
Finland's first private public broadcasting station. 3NB	3NB, Tampere	Tampere, Tavastia	1 November 1923	AM kHz	
Australia's first official station. 2SB; 2BL as from 1 March 1924	ABC Radio Sydney	Sydney	23 November 1923. One of six Sealed Set system stations;	AM 855 kHz	
XRO	N/A	Shanghai, China	November 1923	AM 1500 kHz	50 Watts (1923). First radio station in China.
2FC	2RN, Radio National	Sydney	12 December 1923. One of six Sealed Set system stations;	AM 273 kHz	
Radio Ibérica	N/A	Madrid, Spain	22 December 1923.;	AM 729 kHz	N/A
19 September 1924	Radio Belgrade	Belgrade, Serbia	19 September 1924.;	AM 684 kHz	N/A
3AR	3RN, Radio National	Melbourne, Victoria, Australia	26 January 1924. One of six Sealed Set system stations;	AM 625 kHz	
WES	WLS	Chicago, Illinois	Owned by Sears Roebuck, WLS would come to stand for the World's Largest Store. Sears ran broadcasts from WMAQ studios as WBBX in March 1924. WES tests were conducted 9 to 11 April 1924. WLS would begin on 12 April and became one of 25 original 50,000 watt "Clear Channel" system stations;	Originally AM 870 kHz, AM 890 kHz	Class-A
6WF	720 ABC Perth	Perth, Western Australia	4 June 1924. One of six Sealed Set system stations;	AM 240 kHz	
N/A	Radio Bloemendaal	Bloemendaal, Netherlands	15 June 1924	originally AM 1500 kHz (200m) later AM 1223 kHz (245 m) currently AM 1116 kHz (269 m)	various
8WMC	VOWR	St. John's, Newfoundland and Labrador, Canada	24 July 1924	800 AM	Class B
URI (Unione Radiofonica Italiana), 1-RO	Rai Radio 1	Rome, Italy	6 October 1924	AM 705 (425m) kHz	
KFUO	same as original	St. Louis, Missouri	14 December 1924	AM 850 kHz	Class-B
KOA	same as original	Denver, Colorado, United States	15 December 1924 One of 25 original 50,000 watt "Clear Channel" system stations	AM850 kHz	
Statsradiofonien	DR P1	Copenhagen, Denmark	1 April 1925 (experimental), license granted April 1926, Regular broadcast from April 1926	"Long wave"	N/A
WCSH	WZAN	Portland, Maine	1925	"Long wave"	
N/A	Radio Poland	Warsaw, Poland	1 February 1925 (experimental), Regular broadcast from 18 April 1926	"Medium wave"	N/A
N/A	Radio Romania	Bucharest, Romania	Summer 1925 – 1927 (experimental), license granted March 1928, Regular broadcast from 1 November 1928	"Long wave"	N/A
2BE. Australia's first commercial station. Burgin Electric Company.	N/A	Sydney	7 November 1924 to 6 November 1929	AM 870 kHz. (Wavelength later taken by 2GB.)	B Class, commercial
WEBK	WOOD	Grand Rapids, Michigan, United States	16 September 1924	AM 1130 kHz, presently on 1300 kHz,	Class-B
3LO	774 ABC Melbourne	Melbourne, Victoria, Australia	13 October 1924. One of six Sealed Set system stations;	AM 175 kHz	
5MA	N/A	Adelaide, South Australia	April 1924 to early 1925. One of six Sealed Set system stations.	Does not appear to have actually broadcast	see Arthur William Jarrett
2UE. Australia's third commercial station, and the oldest commercial station still operating.	2UE	Sydney	26 January 1925	AM 1025 kHz	B Class, commercial. Was originally going to broadcast as 2EU, but the callsign was reversed prior to the licence being issued on 7 November 1924.
JOAK	same as is	Tokyo, Japan	22 March 1925	AM 594 kHz	
Bataviase Radio Vereniging	RRI Jakarta stations (part of RRI)	Batavia, Dutch East Indies (now Jakarta, Indonesia)	16 June 1925		
CHRC	CHRC	Quebec City, Quebec/Quebec City, Quebec, Canada	1 April 1926	AM 800 kHz	Class-B. Final broadcast in 2012.
Lietuvos Radijas	LRT Radijas	Kaunas, Lithuania	26 June 1926	AM 1961 kHz	
XOH, later COHB	PBS Harbin News Radio	Harbin, China	1 October 1926	AM 1071 kHz (1926); AM 674 kHz (1928, as COHB); AM 1055 kHz (1945, as XMHR); AM 837 kHz (1949 to present)	100 Watts, 1928 1 kW. First radio station founded by Chinese.
CFCO	same as is	Chatham, Ontario/Chatham-Kent, Ontario, Canada	September 1927	AM 630 kHz	Class-B
JODK	HLKA	Seoul, South Korea	1927	AM 711 kHz	
GOW, ZBW	RTHK	Hong Kong	30 June 1928 (GOW, now RTHK 3)		
1XE	became WGI February 1922 (and WARC March 1925)	Medford, Massachusetts	1916 sporadically, then 1919–1920 till April 1925	? – later on 833 kHz	
2XN		City College of New York, New York City	1913; 1920		
2ZK		New Rochelle, New York	1916		
NSF/HDO, later ANDO and AVRO	NPO	Huizen (transmitter), Hilversum (studio), Netherlands	21 July 1923, from 1930 part of Dutch Public Radio	AM 279 kHz, 1927 also 1004 kHz, today FM network	500 W, 1927 5 kW
2RN (Irish Free State radio)	RTÉ (Irish national radio & television)	General Post Office (O'Connell Street), Dublin, Ireland	1 January 1926	AM 380 kHz, and from Cork AM612 kHz,	
NDO, 50% time KRO, 50% NCRV	NPO	Huizen (transmitter), Hilversum (studio), Netherlands	1927, from 1930 part of Dutch Public radio	AM 160 kHz, 1935 transmitter moved to Kootwijk, 1938 also Jaarsveld 722 kHz, today FM network and 747/1251 kHz	Huizen 15 kW, Kootwijk day 15 kW, evening 120 kW, Jaarsveld 20 kW
2TM	2TM	Tamworth, Australia	27 February 1935	1287 kHz	

=== FM or shortwave ===
Experimental or early radio stations (FM and shortwave)
Station call-sign (original)	Station call-sign (current)	City/location	On air	Transmission frequency (AM radio / FM radio)	Broadcast class
PCGG	N/A	The Hague, Netherlands	6 November 1919 – 11 November 1924	Narrow-band FM, 570 m	N/A
WWV US Government Time Service	WWV	Fort Collins, Colorado	"6 months before KDKA" (May 1920)	2.5 MHz, 5 MHz, 10 MHz, 15 MHz and 20 MHz	HF (Shortwave)
XS (1921–1929), W8XK (1929–1939), WPIT (1939–1940)		Pittsburgh, Pennsylvania	November 1920 – December 1939; Owned and operated by Westinghouse Electric Corporation. Used to relay KDKA signal to AM rebroadcasters in other cities. Broadcast programming from KDKA, and also broadcast The Northern Messenger to the Arctic. Merged with WBOS (1940) and became a VOA transmitter (1942).	15,210 kHz, 11,880 kHz, 6,140 kHz	40 kW (1937)
PCJJ	Radio Netherlands Worldwide	Philips Laboratories at Eindhoven, Netherlands, moved to Hilversum in 1933.	The first shortwave station in Europe. 25 June 1926 (test transmissions began), and the first shortwave station in the world with its own dedicated programming rather than being a simulcast of an AM/MW or LW station such as KDKA. Regular broadcast from 30 May 1927 to May 1940 when the station went dark due to the German occupation of Holland; resumed after liberation October 1945 – 1946 when Philips and other shortwave radio stations taken over by Radio Netherlands Worldwide. Sister station PHI broadcast in Dutch to the Dutch East and West Indies from 1928 to 1930 and 1934 to 1949.	30.2 metres shortwave	
G2NM		Caterham, Surrey, England	11 September 1927.	23 and 33 metres	1 kW
VE9GW	CRCX	Bowmanville, Ontario	April 1930 – 1938 – used to relay CRCT (later CBL) to northern Ontario, northern Manitoba and the Canadian Arctic	6.095 MHz (primarily), 11.810 MHz, 24.380 MHz	25 watt (initially), 200 watts (1031), 500 watts (1932)
HVJ	Vatican Radio	Vatican City	12 February 1931		10 kW (originally)
HCJB	HCJB	Quito, Ecuador	25 December 1931	50.26 metres, later 6050 kHz, 9745 kHz, 11775 kHz and 15155 kHz.	200 watts (initially), 1,000 watt (1937), 10,000 watt (1940), 100,000 (1967), 500,000 (1981), 1,000 (2017)
W8XH		Buffalo, New York	18 March 1934 – July 1939. Replaced in 1944 with an FM station, now known as WBKV.	51.4 & 41.0 MHz	Apex (ultra-shortwave)
W1XOJ		Paxton, Massachusetts/Boston, Massachusetts	1937		Unknown
W1XPW, briefly W65H	WHCN	Hartford, Connecticut	1939	102.9 FM	
W2XMN		Alpine, New Jersey	1939 – 1946	42.8 MHz, later 44.1 MHz	
W2XDA (Schenectady)/W2XOY (New Scotland), later WGFM	WRVE	Schenectady, New York	1939, 20 November 1940 as W2XOY	Originally on FM 48.5 MHz, now FM 99.5	Unknown
W47NV	N/A	Nashville, Tennessee	1941 to 1951		Unknown

=== Networks ===
Early radio networks
Name	Full name	Location	On air	Notes
British Broadcasting Company		United Kingdom	1922–1926	Private commercial company made up of 26 stations by 1926. Nationalised to become the British Broadcasting Corporation (BBC Radio) in 1927.
CNR Radio	Canadian National Railway Radio Department	Canada	1923–1933	First national radio network in North America. Developed by the Canadian National Railway to provide en route entertainment for train passengers but also available to anyone within signal range. Consisted of 27 stations (3 owned and operated and up to 24 "phantom stations" – time leased on affiliated radio stations.
WEAF chain	Broadcasting Company of America	Northeast and Midwest United States	1923–1926	Regional network of AT&T-owned radio stations with New York City radio station WEAF as its hub. Grew to 27 stations (WEAF and 26 affiliates) stretching from Boston to Kansas City by the end of 1925 under the name Broadcasting Company of America, Sold to RCA in 1926 and merged with RCA's WJZ chain to form the National Broadcasting Company (NBC)

== See also ==
- History of radio
- Timeline of radio
- History of broadcasting
- AM broadcasting
  - List of initial AM-band station grants in the United States
  - Extended AM broadcast band
- FM broadcasting
  - FM broadcasting in the USA
  - List of the initial commercial FM station assignments issued by the Federal Communications Commission on October 31, 1940
- List of shortwave radio broadcasters
- List of radios – List of specific models of radios
- Oldest television station
- Time signal
