= WBCR-FM =

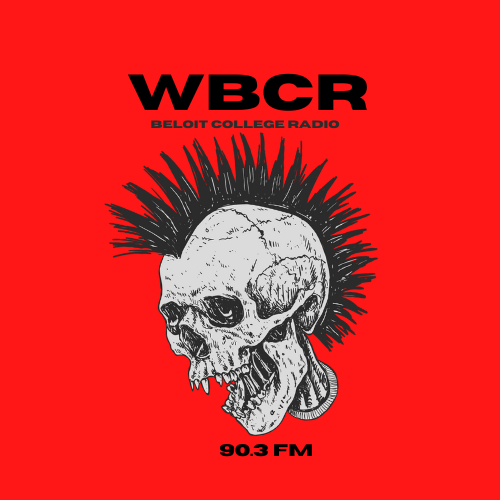
- Beloit, Wisconsin; United States
- Frequency: 90.3 MHz

Programming
- Format: Variety; freeform

Ownership
- Owner: Beloit College; (The Board of Trustees/Beloit College)

History
- First air date: 1907, 1965 (as an FM station)
- Last air date: 2025
- Former call signs: WBCR-FM (1965–1984); WBCR (1984–1989)
- Call sign meaning: Beloit College Radio

Technical information
- Licensing authority: FCC
- Facility ID: 65465
- Class: A
- ERP: 130 watts
- HAAT: 18 meters (59 ft)
- Transmitter coordinates: 42°30′13.1″N 89°1′55.4″W

Links
- Public license information: Public file; LMS
- Webcast: Listen live
- Website: www.wbcr903.com

WBCR-FM (90.3 MHz) was a radio station broadcasting a variety format. Licensed to Beloit, Wisconsin, United States, the station was owned by Beloit College and had its license held by the college's Board of Trustees.

== History ==
The station first aired in 1907 as an early experimental radio station ran by Dr. Charles Aaron Culver. It is one of the oldest radio stations in the world. The station moved to 90.3 MHz as WBCR-FM in 1965. On October 1, 1984, the station modified its call sign to WBCR, but regained the "-FM" suffix on August 22, 1989. On September 19, 2025, the trustees of the station put in an application with the Federal Communications Commission (FCC) to cancel the station's license.
