= Farmer and Company =

Farmer and Company, commonly known as Farmer's, was a retail store in Sydney, Australia.

== History ==
Joseph Farmer and Caroline Farmer established a drapery business in Victoria House, 259 Pitt Street, Sydney (opposite the Victoria Theatre) in September 1840.

In 1847 Farmer retired from business, leasing the shop to Price and Favenc, becoming Price, Favenc and Gwyn with the admission of George Boyce Gwyn. In 1849 a nephew, William Farmer, joined the business and in 1854 was made a partner, the business becoming Farmer, Williams and Giles, drapers, mercers and haberdashers, whose principals were William Farmer, William Williams and Francis Giles. The company was dissolved March 1860, and taken over by William Farmer and Richard Painter and with the inclusion of John Pope, traded as Farmer, Painter and Pope. The company was dissolved in August 1869 and re-formed by Farmer and Pope as Farmer and Company.

John Pope (1 October 1827 – 13 January 1912) was for many years the driving force of the company, and was succeeded by his sons Parke W. Pope and Norman Pope. Parke's son Eric Pope was a director.

In 1874 the business expanded, taking over the adjacent building to the south on Pitt Street.

In 1906 the Pitt Street frontage, designed by Horbury Hunt, was demolished to be replaced with a continuous display window. A major rebuild of the Pitt Street complex in 1907 involved replacing and strengthening the floor of the central building to bring it to the same level as adjoining floors.

In 1916 the company purchased the freehold of Roberts's Hotel at the corner of Market and George streets. Its proprietor was Charles James Roberts MLC.

=== 2FC ===
In 1923 Farmer and Co. Ltd. completed arrangements with the Evening News, the Sydney Morning Herald, JC Williamson's, J & N Tait and Dalgety & Company for establishment of a privately owned radio broadcasting station. The transmitter began operation on a trial basis on 5 December 1923, from a studio in Pitt Street via land lines to the transmitter at Willoughby. The test transmitter had a rated power of 500 watts on a wavelength of 1100 metres (270 kHz) and a wire antenna strung between two 200 feet (61 m) masts.

Receivers tuned that frequency went on sale shortly after. Under the Sealed Set system, subscribers to 2FC paid £3/3/ per annum for the service. With the repeal of sealed set legislation, 2FC in 1927 changed to a 5000 watt transmitter on 422 metres (665 kHz). In 1929, the station was acquired by the Australian Broadcasting Company of which Farmer and Company was a major shareholder. After difficulties making a profit due to piracy, in 1932 this broadcaster was nationalized to become the Australian Broadcasting Commission.

=== Industry consolidation, acquisition by Myer, and demise of the brand ===
The department store sector was undergoing consolidation and, in 1960, Farmers acquired the New South Wales regional retailer, Western Stores.

In early 1961, Farmer's was acquired by Myer Emporium by an exchange of ordinary shares. The New South Wales stores continued to trade as Farmers throughout the 1960s. Following the buy-out of Farmer & Co. preference shares in 1969, all their stores were rebranded as Myer stores around 1974.
