= Arthur William Jarrett =

Australian businesspeople (1874 – 1942)

Arthur William Jarrett (28 October 1874 – 25 December 1942) was a pioneer radio broadcaster in South Australia.

== History ==
Jarrett was born in Adelaide, the fourth son of Aaron Jarrett (died 1910) and his wife Martha Emily Jarrett (died 1919) née Palmer, farmers near Maitland. He followed his parents as a farmer, with a property near Maitland, which he sold up in 1920 and moved to Adelaide. He entered a partnership with his cousin (?) Lendon Arthur Harper (1892–1971) as Harper & Jarrett, general engineers at Clarence Park.

In August 1923 they floated, with one Arthur Landseer Colville (1884–1973), Millswood Auto and Radio Company with £30,000 capital, to take over their business assets and develop a radio broadcasting facility at Millswood. Harper was appointed general manager, and S. L. Copley sales manager. Directors included Harper, Jarrett, S. J. Hunt, E. F. Gryst and R. G. Germein.

The company entered into negotiations with JC Williamson's and J & N Tait to secure entertainment programmes and together founded the South Australian Broadcasting Company to formalise the relationship, with no doubt an eye to creating a monopoly.

The company's business plan was to broadcast high-class radio programmes from their transmitting station 5MA and to gain income from sale of receivers fixed on their wavelength of 850 metres (this followed the government passing laws in August 1923 that standardised the Sealed Set model of broadcast listening as recommended by Ernest Fisk) and signed a contract with AWA for provision of transmitter and receivers. In October 1923 they demonstrated one of their radios installed in a motor-car, picking up signals from a transmitter located at Alberton. They appointed agents in country areas where they had proved their signal could be received reliably, opened a retail store at 113 Gawler Place, and engaged salesmen to sell receivers on commission. By December 1923 5MA was one of only six stations throughout Australia which were licensed to broadcast under this system.

An AWA 250-watt transmitter was installed at 261 Goodwood Road in April 1924, pending supply of a 3000-watt unit.

Their plans unravelled a few months later, when the government reversed its sealed set policy, replacing it with a system of publicly supported stations ("A-class") and those which supported themselves by advertising or otherwise ("B-class"), and tuneable receivers becoming legal if licensed. This cost dearly those who had invested in sealed sets. To compound matters for Jarrett and partners, the wavelength they had opted for (850 m or 350 kHz), though an excellent choice for long-distance broadcasting, was outside the medium-wave broadcast band (530 – 1700 kHz), so could not be picked up by ordinary radios. They had lost their position as South Australia's prime broadcaster to 5CL, which won the State's allocated "A-class" licence.

They opened a store, warehouse and factory at 109 King William Street in 1924.

In 1925 he sold the Gawler Place business for £275; it became "Metro Electrical Radio" in 1926 with proprietors named as Jarrett and Rosslyn Arnold "Ross" Thomas (1900–1979).

Jarrett, who was worth £25,000 (many millions of dollars in today's currency) after selling his farm, attempted to regain his lost fortune by buying and selling real estate in partnership with Alfred Leslie Wyly (1867– ), and by 1937 was bankrupt.

He went farming at Yurgo in the Murray Mallee, then retired to Noarlunga.

== Family ==
Jarrett married Jane Lydia "Jean" Tippett on 11 November 1908. Their family included:

- Rex Wamsley Jarrett (1909–2009) married Jean Kelley on 30 August 1941, lived at Whyalla
- Bettie Palmer Jarrett (1911–1996) married Robert Mullan on 22 February 1936
- Nell Paddon Jarrett (1915–??? )
