= CFA Training College =

Coordinates: 37°40′55.8″S 144°13′36.2″E

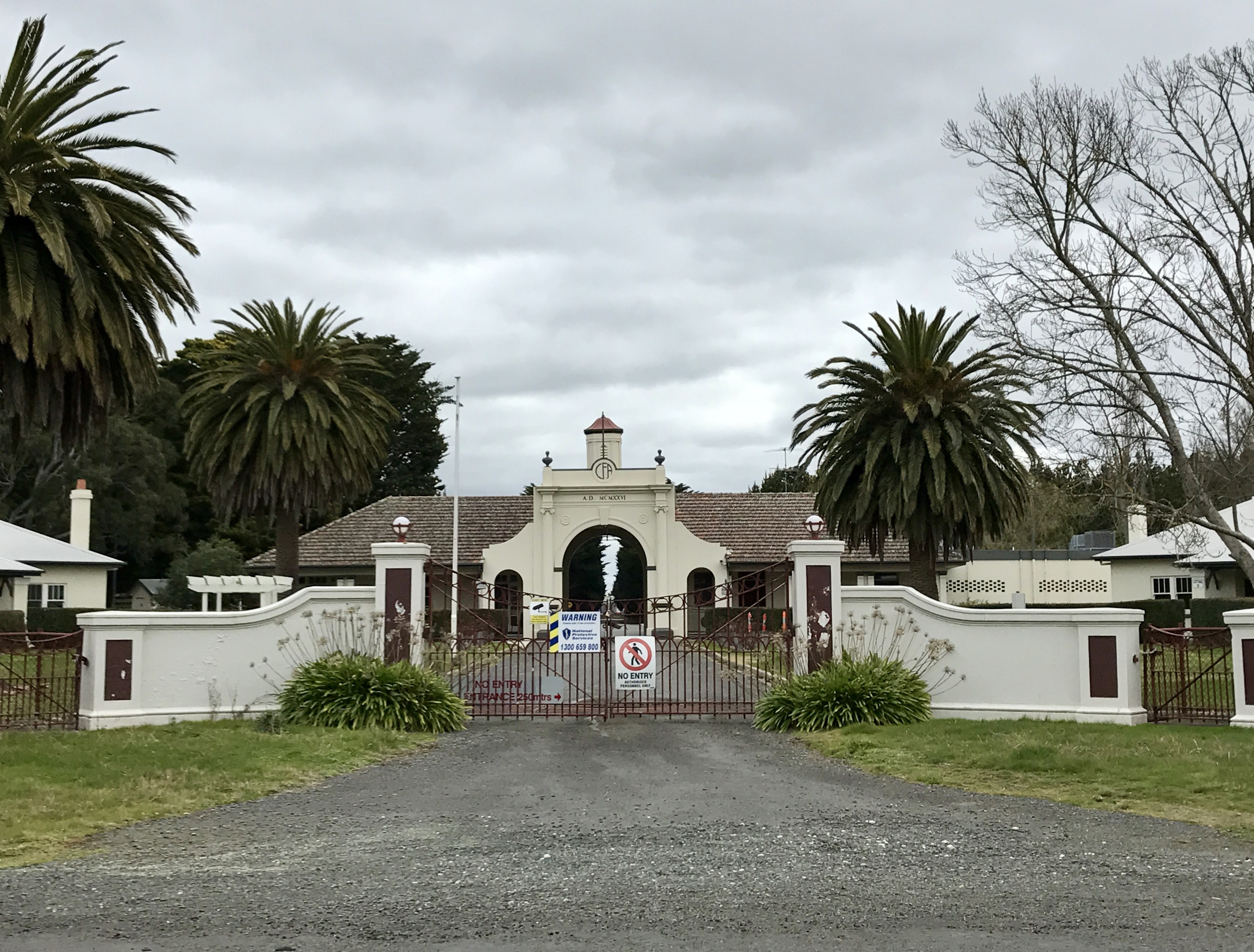
view of CFA Training College from the front

CFA Training College in Fiskville, Victoria was the training college for members of the Country Fire Authority (CFA), a large, predominantly volunteer fire and emergency service which has legislative responsibility for fire and emergencies in regional Victoria, Australia. The site is also known as Fiskville, named for Ernest Fisk of AWA.

The college was located on the site of the old beam wireless shortwave transmitter, about 10 kilometres south of Ballan.

The facility was closed permanently in March 2015 following the detection of contaminated water on the site, caused by CFA management knowingly using carcinogenic chemicals to cut costs, and the 2011 finding that the site is associated with a cancer cluster. The contamination extended to properties surrounding the training facility. After it was announced that up to 80 staff would lose their jobs, some CFA members criticised the closure and rallied to keep the site operating by requesting the government properly decontaminate the site and invest in infrastructure upgrades through use of local campaigning, social media and petitions.

== History of Fiskville ==
The name of the property came from Ernest Fisk, the Chairman of AWA (AWA) when the property was owned and managed by AWA and used as a long-distance radio communication station as part of the Imperial Wireless Chain. The original California bungalow style buildings at the front of the property, built to house the station's technical staff and their families, were later used as accommodation for student firefighters. The original generator building housed the Teaching Centre, while the concrete blocks used to anchor the aerials' guy wires are still visible in multiple locations around the property.

== Facilities ==
CFA Fiskville was used by CFA volunteers and staff for general training (both theory and practical), but had many other uses, including:

- Live-in training for CFA career firefighters
- Fire training for corporate clients
- Some training with Metropolitan Fire Brigade firefighters
- Frequently used by RAAF Airfield Firefighters from RAAF Laverton & RAAF Point Cook Base Fire Section and Fire Training School.

=== The Pad ===
The practical training area was known as the 'Pad'. On the Pad there were several different drill areas, including:

- Plane crash, located rear of Bunnings shed (Big Green Shed) in Blue gums. (Search & Rescue)
- 3 large petrol storage tanks, Pyrose Parade (Gas fire, Search & Rescue)
- Large vertical refinery structure, Pyrose Parade (Gas fire, fog attack)
- Service station, Jolimont Road (Gas fire, car fire, fog attack, structural risk)
- 2 horizontal gas bullets, one vertical gas bullet, and small refinery structure, Jolimont Road (Gas fire, fog attack)
- Loading dock, Pyrose pde (Flammable Liquids, Gas)
- Running Fuel Drain Fire (Flammable Liquids, Gas)
- Hospital, Jolimont Road (Structure fire, Search & Rescue)
- Single Storey Structure, normally car under carport, 7 Tower Road (Car fire, Structural risk, Search & Rescue)
- Fish & Chip Shop, back of 7 Tower Road (Flammable Liquid Fire, Structure fire, Search & Rescue)
- Flashover Room, back of 7 Tower Road (Flashover demonstration)
- Double Storey Structure, Tower Road (Structure fire, Thermal layering, Search & Rescue)
- Multiple locations for motor vehicle accidents (MVAs) and car fires
- Factoryette Tower Rd/Jolimont Rd – Structure attack, search and rescue

=== Other facilities ===
There were other scenarios around the grounds of Fiskville including a train derailment, training power lines, military helicopter, flammable liquids, truck fires, and an airstrip.

Some non-fire related training equipment included Urban Search & Rescue (USAR), 4WD course, and low ropes course.

There were comprehensive theory facilities including seminar rooms, urban and rural TEWT (Tactical Exercise Without Troops) rooms, and other classroom training facilities.

=== Fire station ===
Fiskville was able to operate as a de facto tin shed fire station—it had no boundaries, but responded when neighbouring brigades requested its appliances (if available). The centre ran one Type 4 SEM Scania, an Isuzu Type 3 Medium pumper (NSW Back), an Isuzu Type 3 Heavy pumper, and a 3.4D Tanker. The old 87 Hino was retired in August 2013.

== Cancer cluster allegations ==
In December 2011, former CFA chief Brian Potter alleged that dozens of cases of cancer and other illnesses, including his own, were linked to the use of water contaminated by chemicals at the Fiskville site. Potter died, aged 70, in February 2014. In 2016, these claims were supported by a parliamentary inquiry established in 2014, concluding "epidemiological evidence suggests that the contamination at Fiskville is likely to have caused cancer and other illnesses" and "People who have been harmed by unsafe training practices at Fiskville have a right to justice".

=== Timeline ===
In initial response to Potter's claims, the Premier of Victoria, Ted Baillieu, announced an inquiry headed by Professor Rob Joy into the allegations. The report of Joy's inquiry was presented to the Country Fire Authority in late June 2012 and released shortly after with a response from the CFA.

Joy concluded: "We found that the current situation at Fiskville is that these legacy issues need to be further investigated but there's no good reason to conclude that they pose any significant risk to anyone on the site at present. Certainly further work needs to be done and CFA have agreed to do that."

However, in November 2014 a Monash University study, Fiskville Firefighters' Health Study, showed statistically significant heightened cancer rates in those associated with the Fiskville facility.

On 21 January 2015, the newly elected Premier of Victoria, Daniel Andrews, and the Minister for Emergency Services, Jane Garrett, announced the findings of the Fiskville Cancer Study and issued a media release titled "Cancer Cluster Found at Infamous Fire Facility". The media release stated "Firefighters who worked at the Fiskville Training Facility have higher than expected rates of skin, testicular and brain cancer" and that "The Andrews Labor Government will ask the Parliamentary Inquiry into Fiskville to include the Monash report in its considerations. The Inquiry will also get to the bottom of how this occurred, how widespread the exposure was and who should be held responsible."

On 3 March 2015, the site at Fiskville was closed indefinitely after tests on two mains water storage tanks found low level traces of perfluorooctanesulfonic acid (PFOS) from a banned firefighting foam. The chairman and chief executive of WorkSafe Victoria stood down at the request of the state government, due to concerns about the authority's handling of the contamination claims and its declaration that the site was safe. On 26 March 2015, the Victorian Government announced that the Fiskville facility would be closed permanently, after new toxicology tests revealed high levels of contamination on the site.

In May 2016 the inquiry found that the firefighter's claims were justified, and that CFA management had knowingly used dangerous practices and been aware of the contamination for some time.
