= Sealed Set =

In Australia, in 1924 Ernest Fisk of AWA suggested the introduction of a sealed set system (also known as a sealed receiver) where radio sets could only receive the transmitting service (or services) to which they were licensed.

Under this model, the federal government would issue a licence to transmit on a given wavelength (or frequency in modern terminology) and oversee the manufacture of receivers locked on that wavelength. The owner of the transmitting licence could then charge the receiver's owner a recurrent fee that would be used to run the station. This was seen as preferable to the British situation where the government backed a monopolistic service (the British Broadcasting Company as it was then) and collected a single licence fee from each household with a receiver.

There appears to have been little attention at the time to a third possible model; that of the licensee charging for advertisements, as was done in the United States.

Radio amateurs were compelled to sign agreements that they would not carry out activities that would challenge this project. Under the legislation being drafted to implement this policy, it would be illegal for the consumer to do unauthorised tampering with the radio.

The following stations operated under the system:

- 2SB, Sydney, Sydney Broadcasters Ltd, 13 November 1923 (known as 2BL from 1 March 1924);
- 2FC, Sydney, Farmer & Company, 8 December 1923;
- 3AR, Melbourne, Associated Radio Co, 26 January 1924;
- 3LO, Melbourne, Broadcasting Co of Australia, 13 October 1924;
- 5MA, Adelaide, Millswood Auto and Radio, April 1924; closed 1925;
- 6WF, Perth, Westralian Farmers, 4 June 1924.

As early as July 1924, the sealed set system was declared to be unsuccessful and was replaced by a system of A Class and B Class stations. There were one or two A Class stations in each major market and these were paid for by a listener's licence fee imposed on all listeners-in. The five former sealed set stations became A Class stations, and they were soon joined by stations in other State capitals, and by a number of B Class (later commercial stations).

== Contemporary Sealed Sets ==
A lot of today's electronic game products have chipsets with keys, that make it difficult or impossible to interchange the integrated circuits in the device, in order to repair it, or to carry out certain interface or applications. Some people do get around the keys, but it is quite an involved process. There is quite a good counterculture scene however, and there are quite a few people who do this.

For minidisc recorders that have a USB port, it is very difficult to get your original recording out to a computer, because the set is firewalled, to prevent copying. An HD minidisc recorder will refuse to allow the digital transfer of an ordinary NET MD recording, and will only allow you one attempt at copying an original HD-minidisc recording that you have made. The transfer can only be done with the program "Sonic Stage" generally supplied with the recorder. Even when you do copy the original ATRAC file to the computer, it will only play on that particular computer and will also no longer play if you change the computer's operating system.

Without effective circumvention, it is necessary to get Sonic Stage to produce a wave file, and to never overwrite your original minidisc, in order to adequately preserve whilst distributing your recording.

== In Computing See ==
Trusted Execution Technology

The Microsoft Palladium Project

== In Recorded Media See ==
SCMS

Macrovision
