= Palau Broadcasting Station =

Radio station in Koror, Palau

The Palau Broadcasting Station (Japanese: パラオ放送局, Hepburn: Parao Hōsō Kyoku) was a radio station established by NHK in September 1941 in Koror, then the capital of Palau, while it was under Japanese administration under the South Seas Mandate. The station began broadcasting in September 1941, but closed in 1944 shortly before the island was invaded by the United States.

The station only broadcast on shortwave radio (6090 kHz, 9565 kHz, 11740 kHz, all 10 kW each) throughout its existence, using the JRAK callsign.

== History ==
Palau had been under Japanese control since 1914 when it was seized from the German Empire during World War I, and subsequently turned into a League of Nations mandate in 1919. In September 1941, shortly before the outbreak of the Pacific War, a radio station was set up for the islands by NHK, who was solely responsible for using it for management and programming, at an International Telecommunications Association facility. As the southernmost transmitter in Japan, it was useful to disseminate propaganda in favor of Japan's Greater East Asia Co-Prosperity Sphere and Japanese expansionism. The station started broadcasting on September 24, 1941. Its first director was Meikichi Iwasaki, who later moved to the NHK Okinawa Broadcasting Station in May 1943. His opening speech noted that the station was set up to accomplish the missions of the Broadcasting Report, as well as to demonstrate all of the actions and satisfy listeners in the Japanese mainland.

The station's was headquartered in Airai and had a transmitter manufactured by NEC, located in Ngatpang. Most of the time, it relayed the service aimed at East Asia (6:00-10:00, 11:30-13:00, 14:00-15:30, 16:30-22:00) in Japanese, while it had two periods of English-language programming a day (15:30-16:00 catering Hong Kong and Hawaii, 22:00-00:00 catering Java and Singapore). Plans to expand the facilities started in 1942, in order to separate the equipment for communication and transmission, but the plans were halted in 1943 when a ship sunk while transporting equipment.

In 1944, the number of air raids on the island grew, prompting NHK to close operations of the station on August 1. The transmitters were subsequently destroyed during the Battle of Peleliu by the United States. Following the invasion, the United States Army established WSZB on the AM band; that station is currently known as T8AA.
