= 2CM =

- Sydney, New South Wales; Australia
- Broadcast area: Sydney

Programming
- Language: English

Ownership
- Owner: Charles Dansie Macluran

History
- First air date: 1921
- Former frequencies: Longwave: 214 kHz: Sydney; until 21 February 1924; later on shortwave
- Call sign meaning: Charles Macluran

2CM was an experimental Australian broadcasting station operated by Charles Dansie Maclurcan. In 1921, 2CM became the first Australian station to regularly broadcast music and talk. However, Ernest Fisk of AWA did conduct an isolated experiment in which music was broadcast, in 1906).

In some quarters Maclurcan has been called Australia’s leading radio amateur.

== History ==
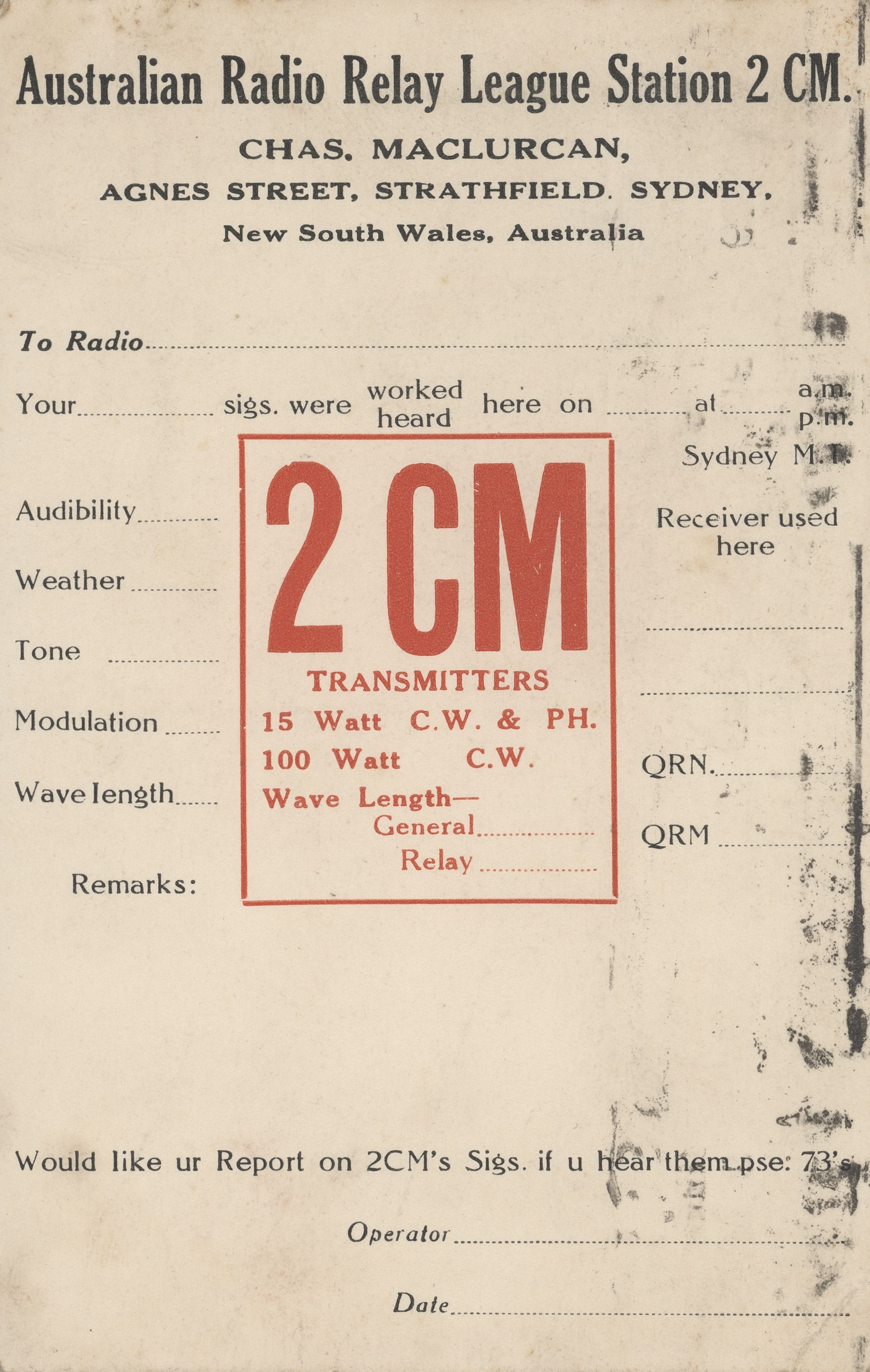
Blank QSL card from VK2CM Charles Maclurcan to VK3BQ Max Howden

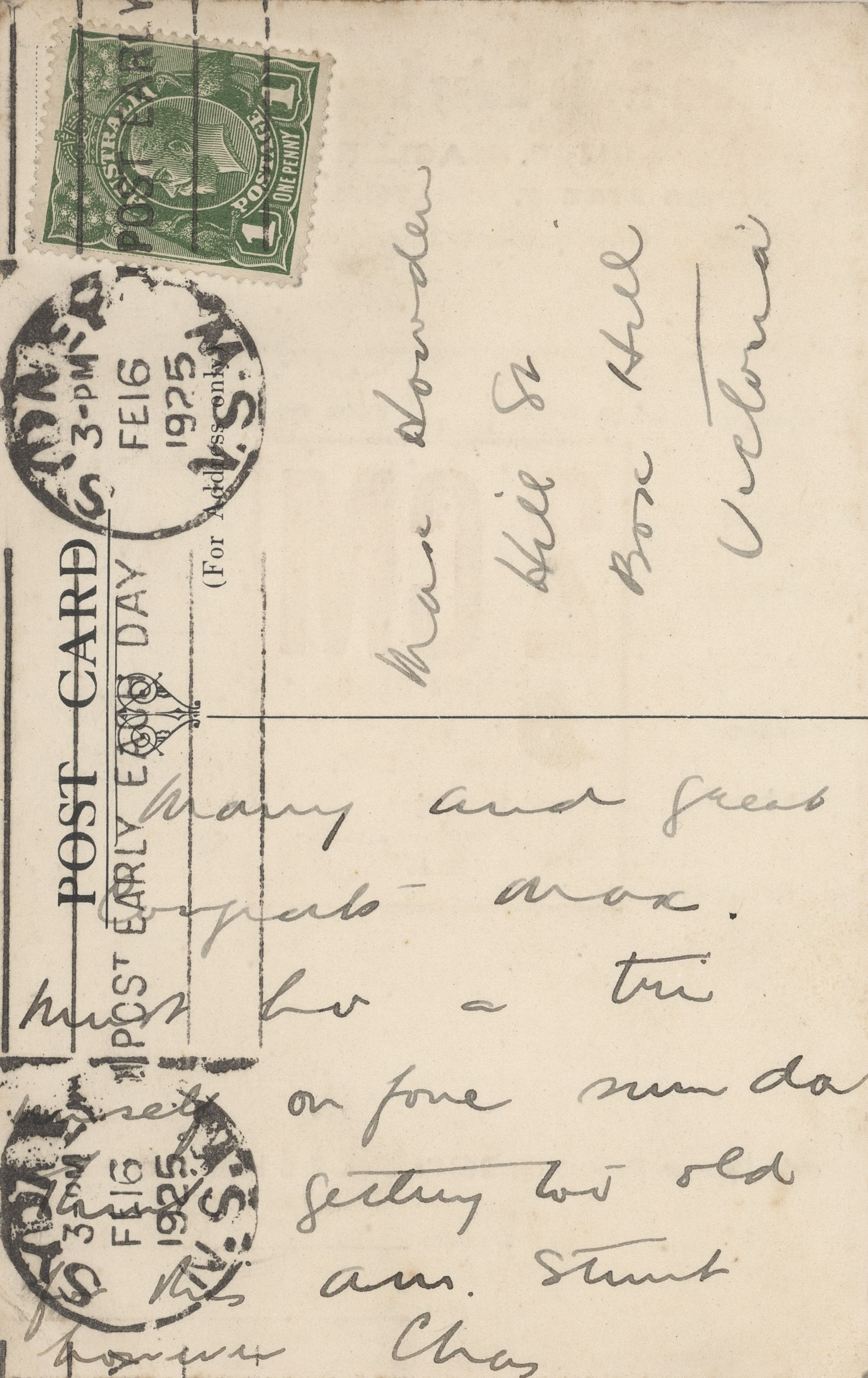
Note on reverse of QSL card, Charles congratulates Max on first successful two way telephony contact between Australia and England, February 1925

The electrical engineering firm of Maclurcan and Lane was issued an experimental licence in 1910. The principals of the firm were Charles Dansie Maclurcan and his brother-in-law Cyril Herbert Dodson Lane; Both were wireless experimenters and the firm traded with other Sydney area wireless experimenters, although this was a minor part of their business. The station was established on the roof of the Wentworth Hotel and both were involved in transmission and reception from the station. A major fire started in the station's equipment room in 1912 destroyed the valuable wireless facility. Only concerted action by the fire services prevented the fire spreading to the hotel proper. The station was not re-established prior to the commencement of World War I when all experimental licences were revoked for the duration.

In 1921 2CM commenced broadcasting Sunday night classical music concerts on the long wave band (214 kHz.), using seven watts.

Maclurcan broke numerous long-distance broadcasting records, including an 0.0037 watt transmission, that was recorded as being heard in New Zealand and San Francisco. It is believed that he was the only Australian amateur allowed to operate during World War I. At this time, the station was situated at the Maclurcan family’s Wentworth Hotel, in the Church Hill district of the Sydney central business district, but after the war, Maclurcan built a new installation at his home in the Sydney suburb of Strathfield.

Note: A Path Loss calculation shows, for a transmission frequency of 3.5 MHz, a loss of some 110 dB (some 10^–11) over the approximately 2000 km path, implying a received power level of some 3.7 x 10^–14 watts. This calculation does not account for losses due to ionospheric reflection (if the working was in the 3~30 MHz HF band), or for over-water attenuation if the working was not via ionospheric reflection. Adding in a reasonable 20 dB extra loss, the signal level would be well below 0.5 microvolts, a challenging level for modern radio receivers. While heterodyne detection of Morse Code is a known strategy for weak signal detection, the claim would need independent verification to be upheld.

2CM was issued with the first broadcasting licence in Australia, Licence No.1, signed by Prime Minister Billy Hughes, in December 1922. 2SB was later the first station to be officially recognised, on 23 November 1923.

Maclurcan received over 2,000 letters from listeners who had heard his initial transmissions. 2CM was also the first station to publish a program guide. Each day’s broadcasting ended with the invocation: don’t forget to wind up the clock and put out the cat. 2CM was transferred to the short wave band on 21 February 1924.

Charles Maclurcan was President of the Wireless Institute of Australia, immediately following Ernest Fisk. Maclurcan also designed and built the popular Maclurcan radio receiver.

The call sign 2CM is the only one listed by the Federal Government as never to be reissued, in recognition of the pioneering achievements of Charles Maclurcan.

== See also ==
- History of broadcasting
- History of broadcasting in Australia
- Oldest radio station
- Timeline of Australian radio
