= Ernest Fisk =

English Australian radio pioneer

Sir Ernest Fisk
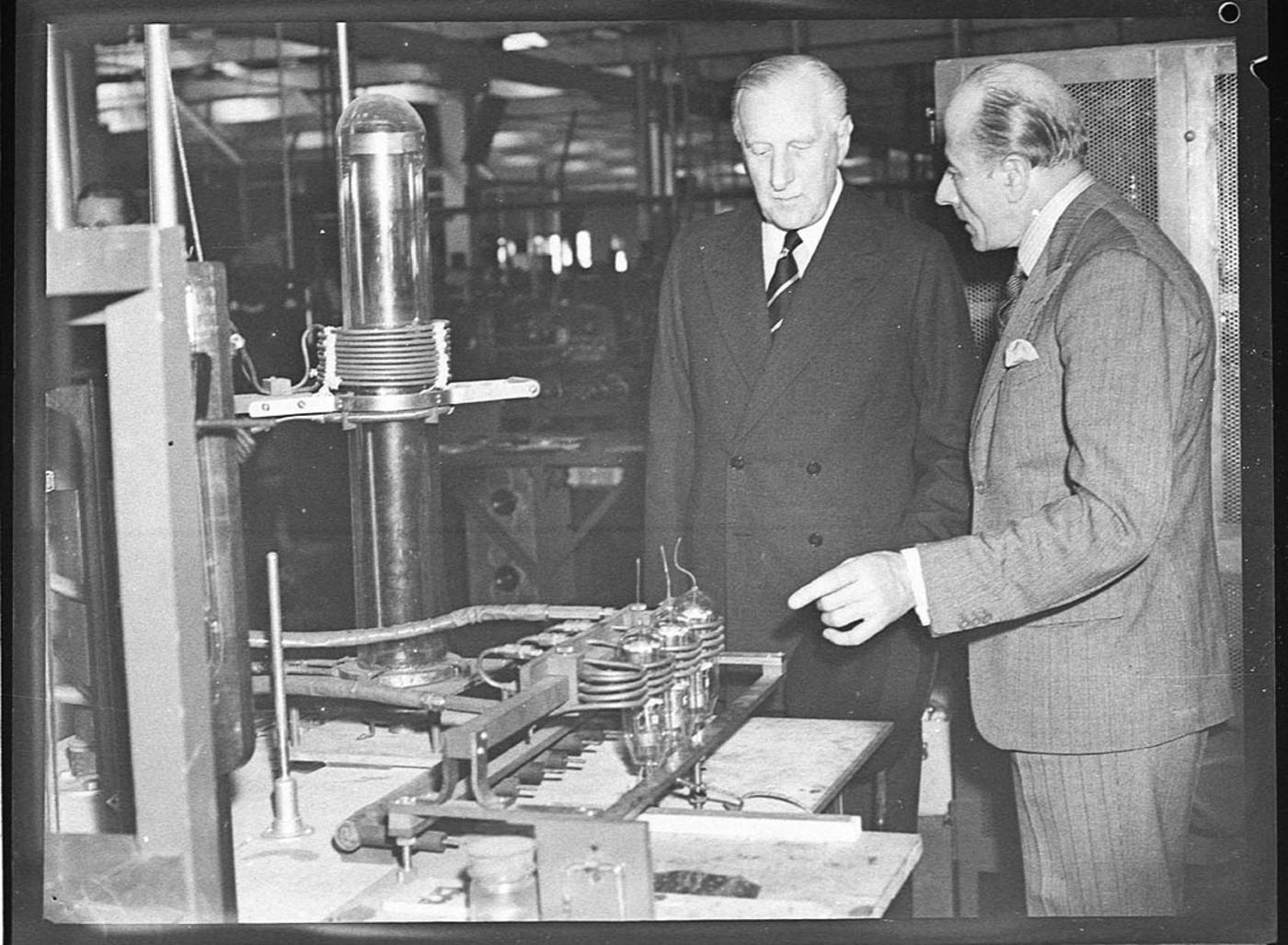
- Ernest Fisk (right) with Governor-General Gowrie during a factory tour in 1939
- Born: Ernest Thomas Fisk; 8 August 1886; Sunbury, Middlesex, England
- Died: 8 July 1965 (aged 78); Roseville, New South Wales Australia
- Education: Marconi Training School, University of Sydney
- Occupations: Businessman and entrepreneur, TV/radio engineer
- Known for: Founder, later managing director & chairman of AWA; Managing director of EMI
- Awards: see: Honours

Sir Ernest Thomas Fisk (8 August 1886 – 8 July 1965) was an English Australian businessman and entrepreneur, TV and radio engineer, he was the founder (1913) and later managing director (1916) and chairman (1932) of AWA. In 1944 was appointed managing director of the EMI music empire.

== Biography ==
=== Early life and training ===
Born the second child of Thomas Harvey Fisk and Charlotte Harritte Holland, he was educated at local Australian schools, although also enrolled at the United Kingdom College, a private London coaching college, he subsequently attended the University of Sydney in 1917, to do a diploma course in the Department of Economics and Commerce.

In June 1906, Fisk joined the Marconi Training School, and at Liverpool and Chelmsford, learnt morse code and wireless technology, qualifying as a radio operator and engineer.

== Career ==
Fisk from selling newspapers, graduated in engineering in the works of Frederick Walton, before becoming one of the first telegraphists at the British Post Office.

from 1909 he worked at American Marconi, demonstrating wireless technology

When first visiting Australia in mid-1910 he demonstrated the Marconi Apparatus for the Orient Steam Navigation Company.

22 September 1918 he proved the possibility of direct radio communication from the UK to Australia by Billy Hughes and Sir Joseph Cook, receiving the first such message at his Sydney home, "Lucania". A memorial was erected on 14 December 1935 to celebrate the achievement.

In August 1919, Sydney received its first demonstration of radio telephony.

Throughout his career he held many key positions in the electronics industry. In the 1950s he predicted that color televisions would be in world-wide use within 30 years, and solar power would be used to cool and heat houses.

The CFA Training College, Fiskville, about 10 kilometres south of Ballan, Victoria, is named after him. From 1927 to 1969 it was the location of the shortwave wireless transmitting complex operated by AWA as part of the Imperial Wireless Chain.

== Honours ==
source: Australian Dictionary of Biography

In 1933, he was invested to the Order of the Crown of Italy

Fisk received the King George V Silver Jubilee Medal in 1935

Fisk was knighted on 11 May 1937.

== Gallery ==
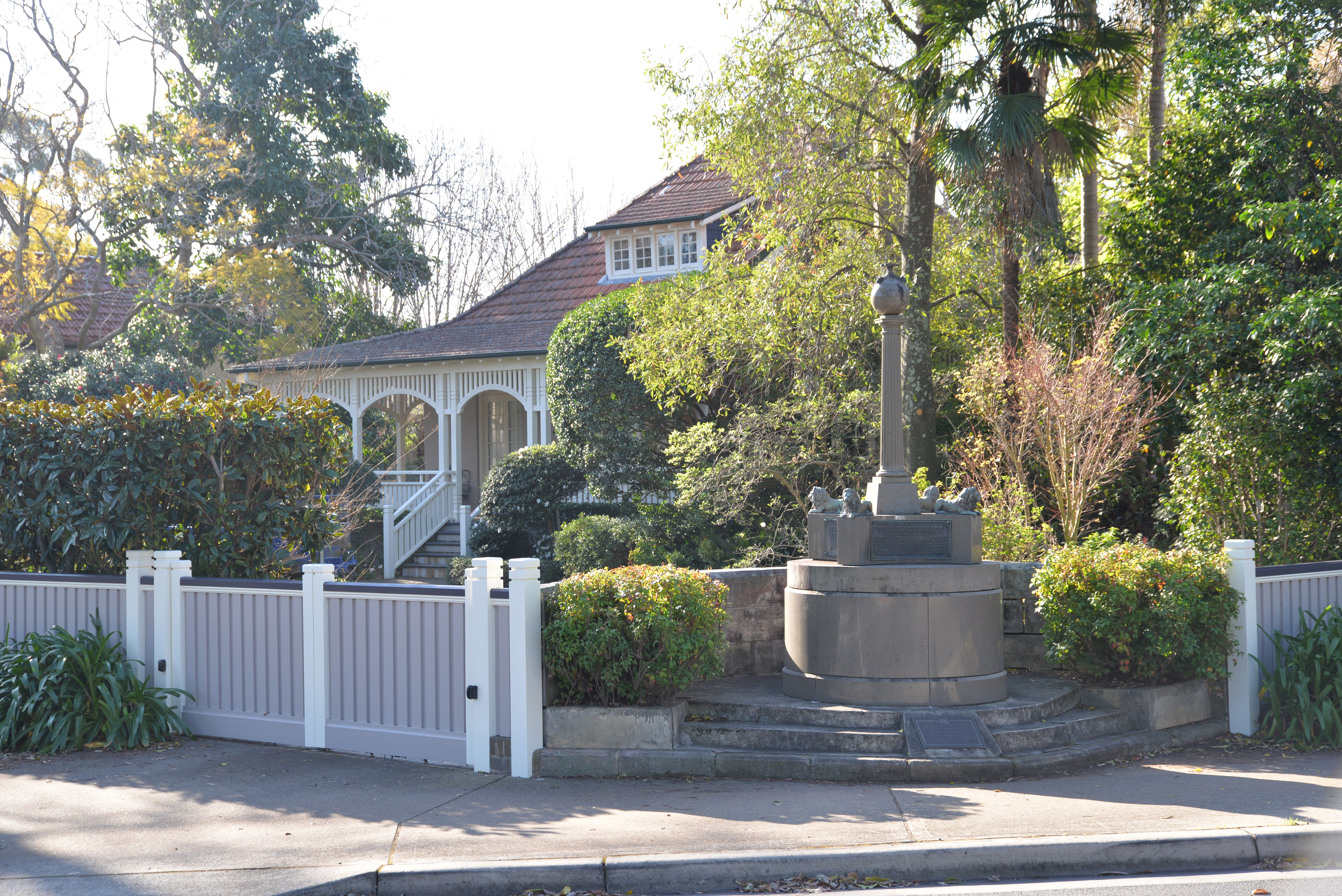
Ernest Fisk's house "Lucania", Wahroonga, Sydney, Australia. Site of the first wireless message from Wales to Australia, 22 September 1918.

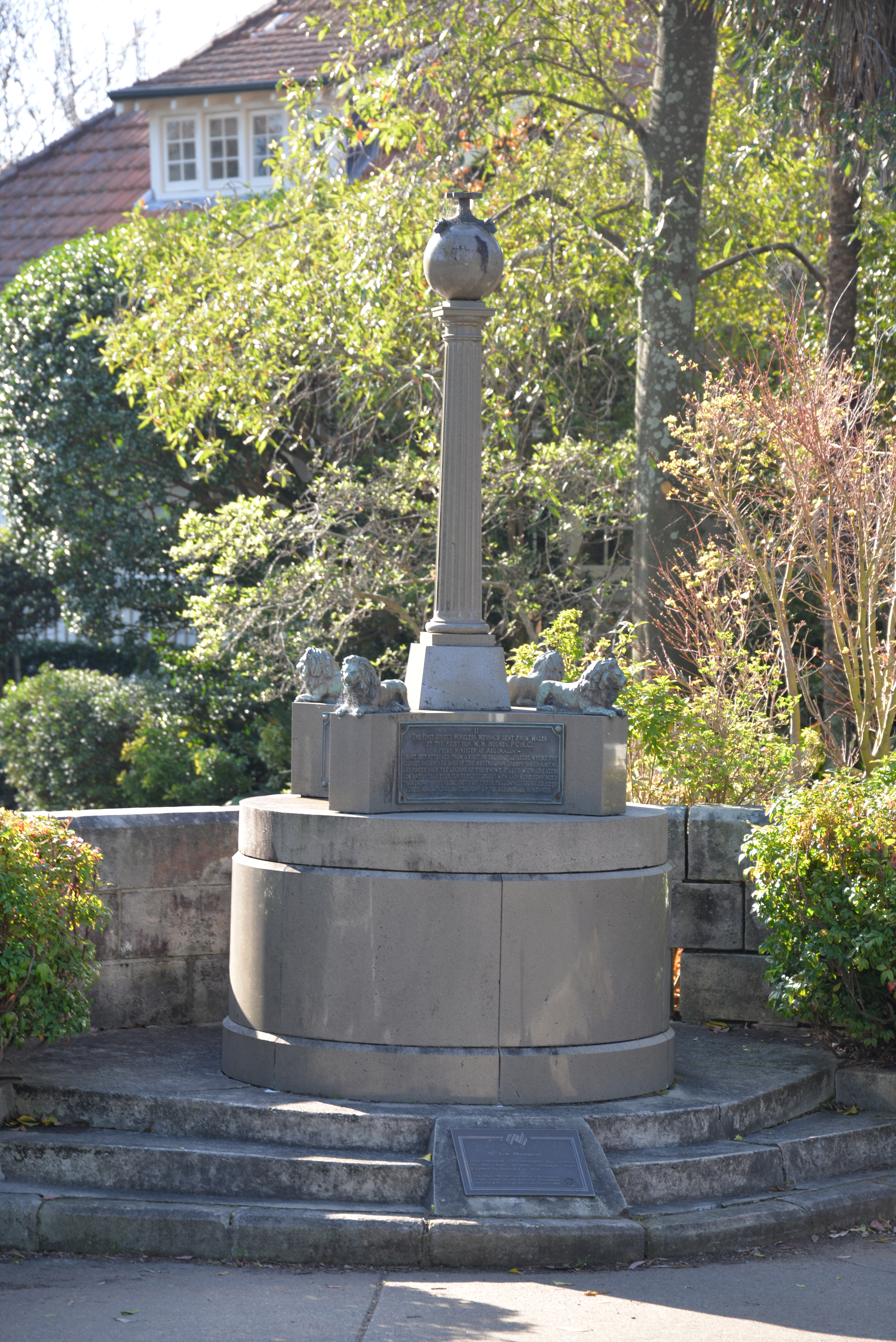
The monument erected 14 December 1935.

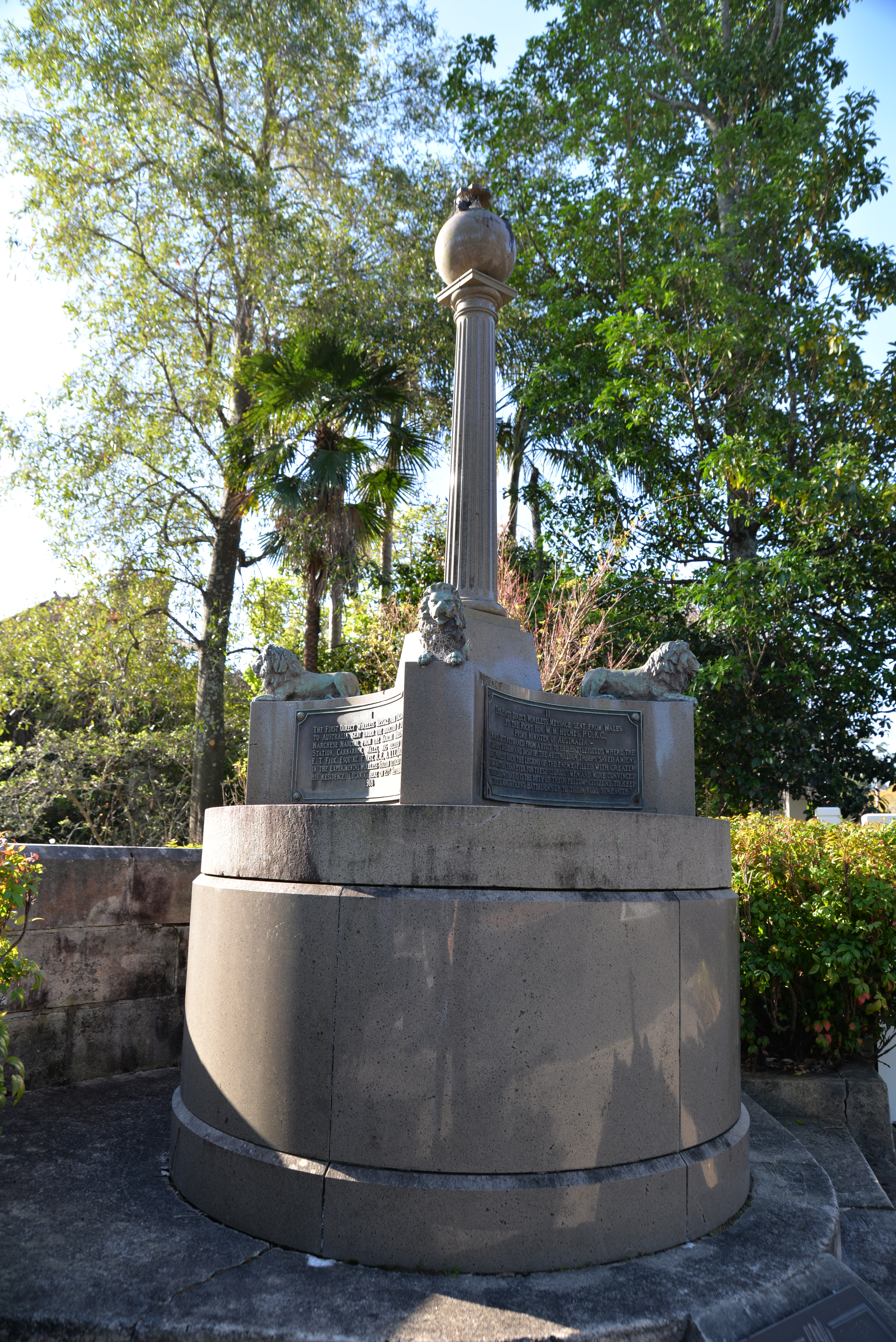
The monument.

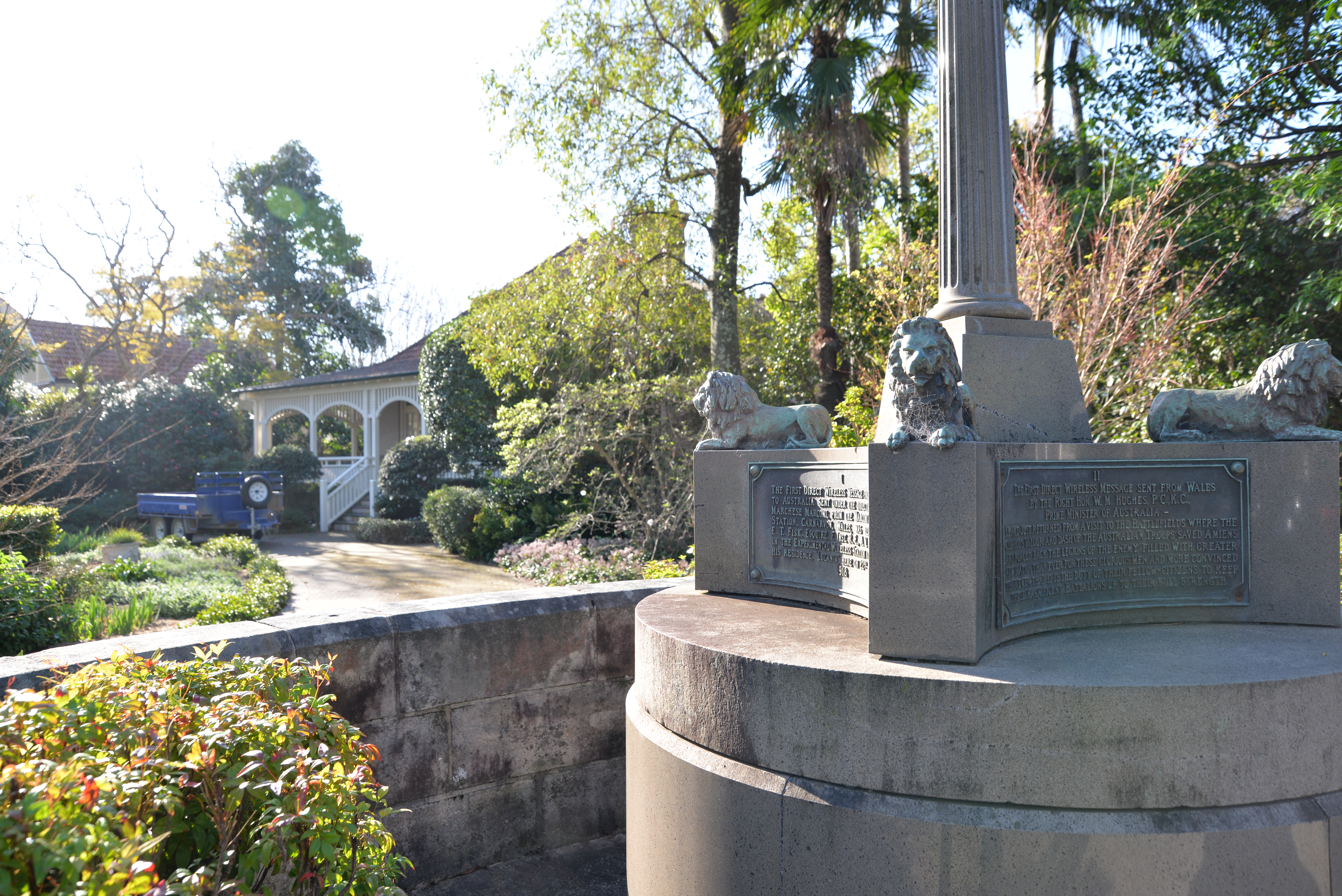
The monument with "Lucania" behind.

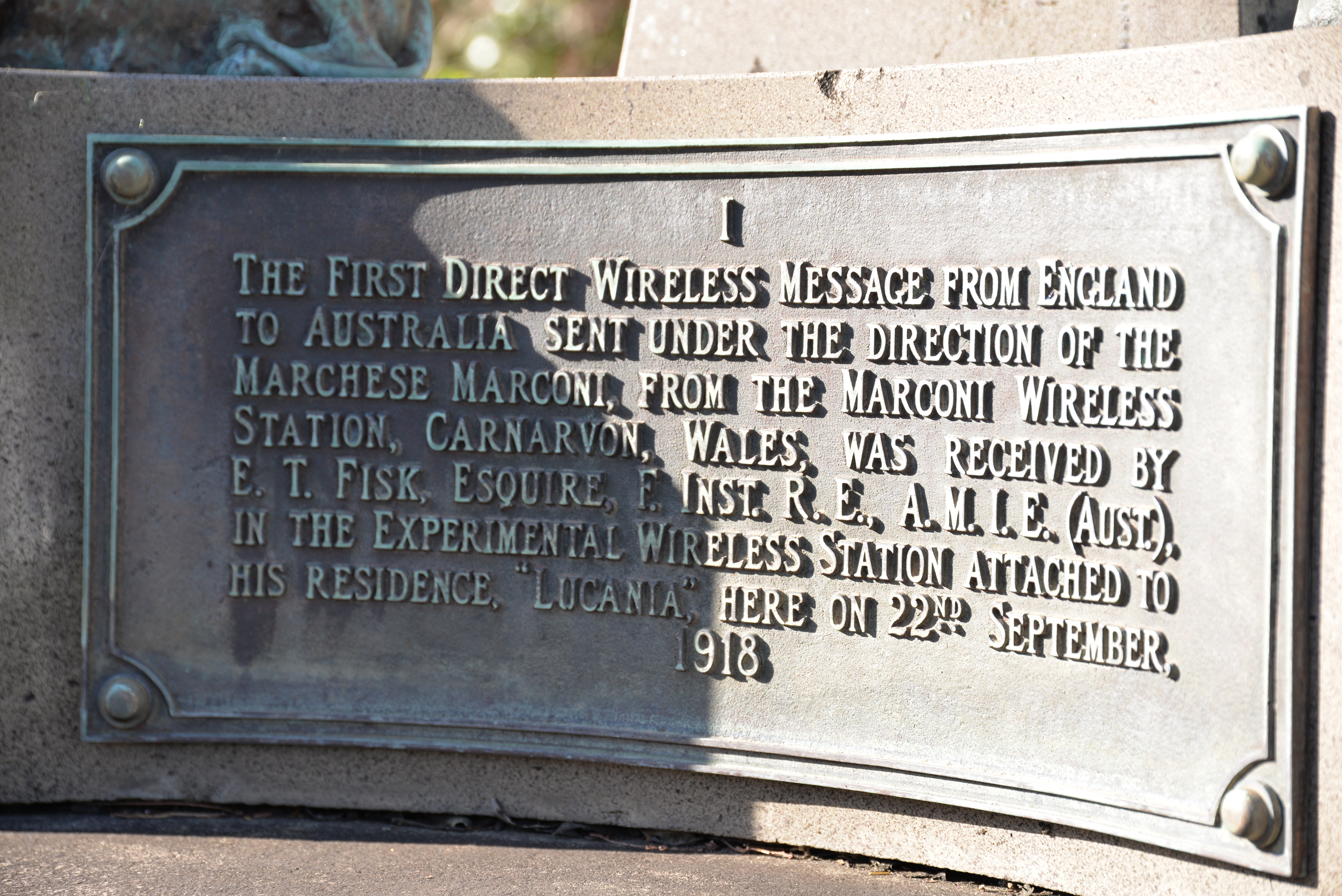
Detail of inscription on the monument Part I.

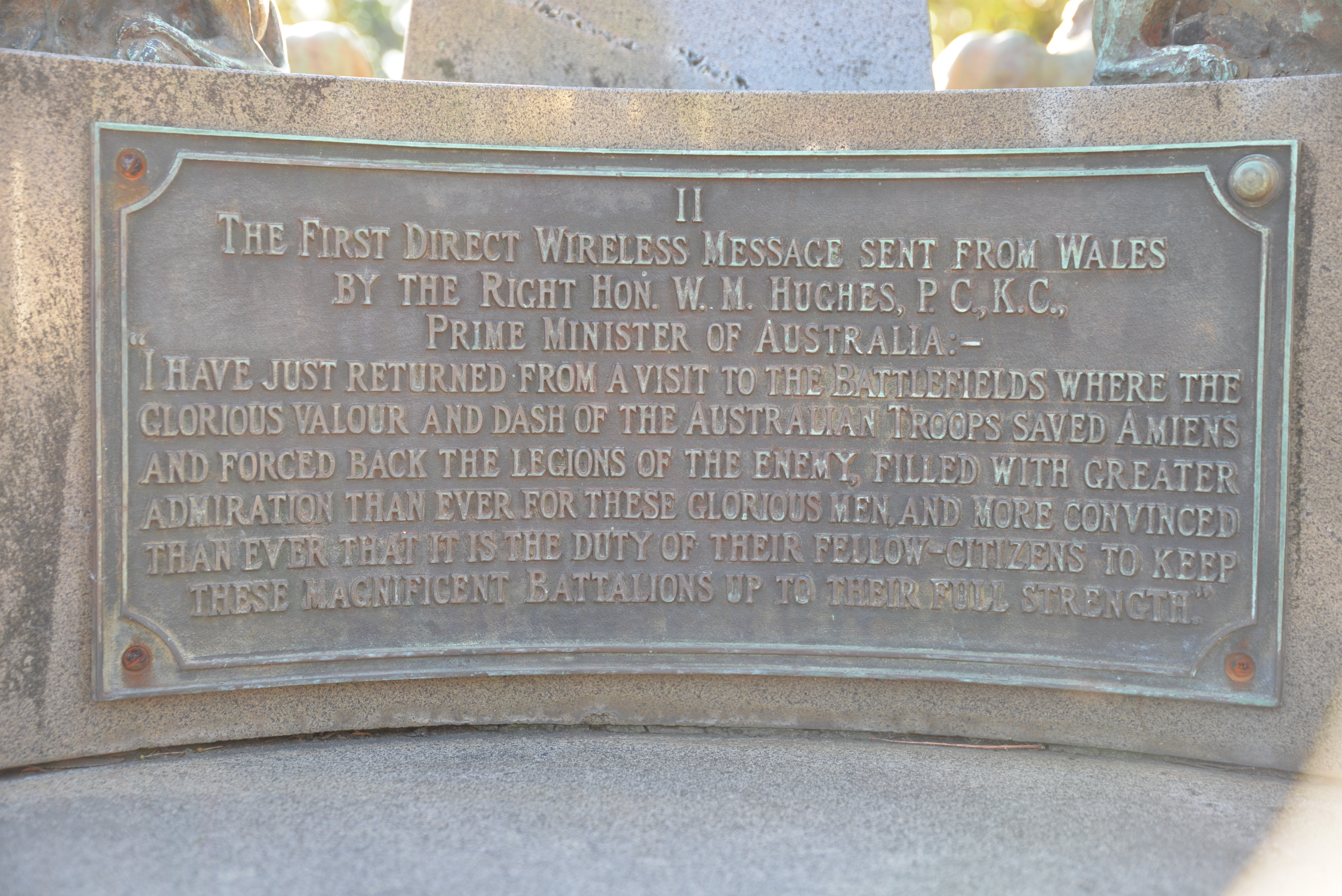
Detail of inscription on the monument Part II.

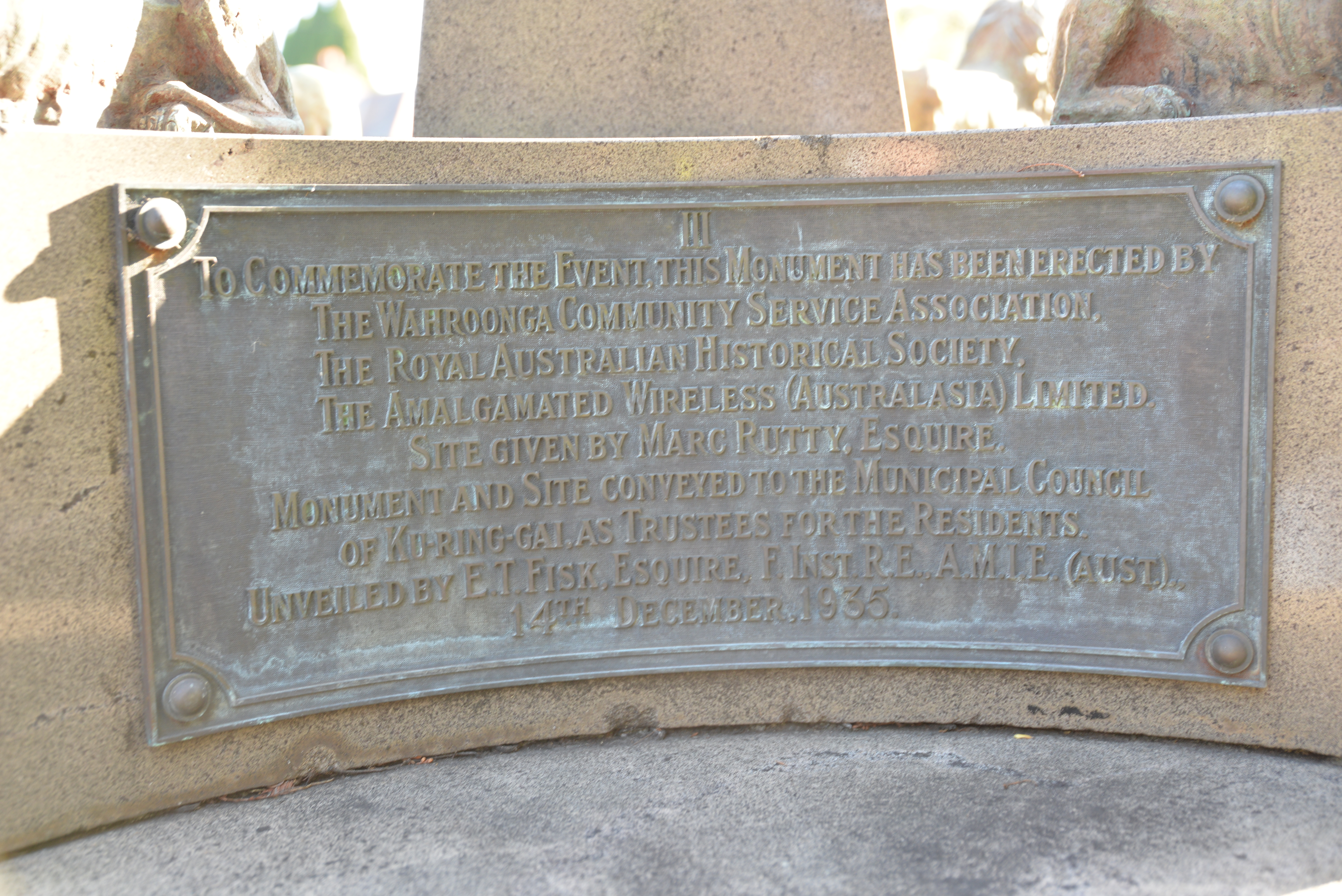
Detail of inscription on the monument Part III.

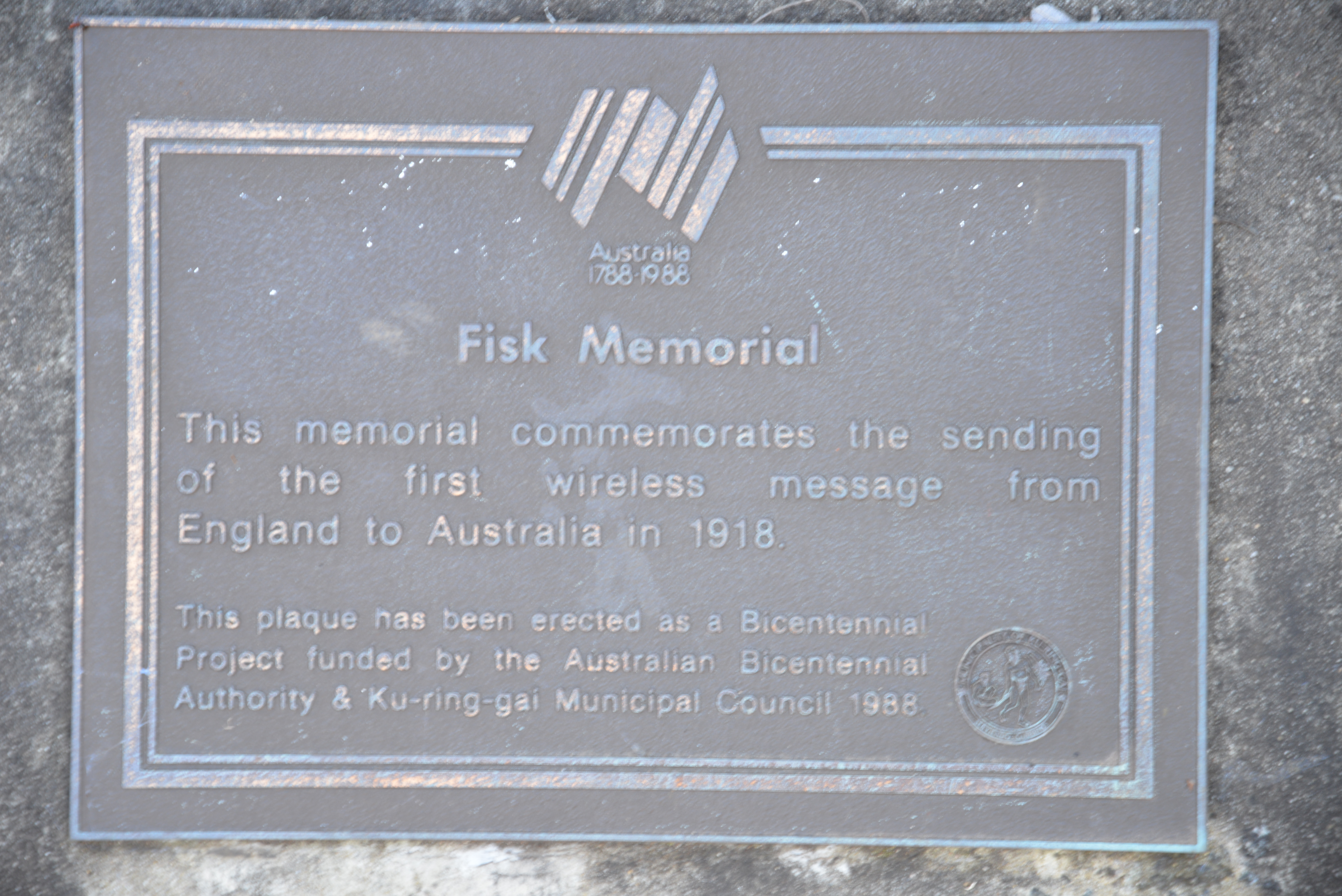
Bicentennial plaque celebrating the achievement 70 years later in 1988.
