= Baila music =

Music of Sri Lanka

Baila (also known as bayila; from the Portuguese verb bailar, meaning to dance) is a form of music, popular in Sri Lanka and among Goan Catholics, Mangalorean Catholics, and Bombay East Indians in India. The genre originated centuries ago among the Portuguese Burghers and Sri Lankan Kaffirs. Baila songs are played during parties and weddings in Sri Lanka, Goa, and Mangalore accompanied by dancing.

Baila music, as a form of folk art, has been popular for centuries in Sri Lanka. During the early 1960s, it entered into Sri Lanka's mainstream culture, primarily through the work of police officer turned singer Wally Bastiansz. He began adapting the 6/8 "kaffirhina" rhythms to accommodate Sinhala lyrics. By the 1970s musicians, including MS Fernando and Maxwell Mendis, had helped Baila grow into a well known and respected style of Sri Lankan popular music. It is primarily considered dance music.

== History ==
After their arrival in 1505, the Portuguese began to convert the Sinhalese to Roman Catholicism, building their wealth and power through the spice and slave trade. As early as 1630, African Kaffirs were brought to Sri Lanka to work as slaves or soldiers. The Kaffirs were once described as a people 'steeped in opium and witless with drink'. The Kaffirs' carefree spirit inspired two music forms known as chicote and "kafrinha" infusing them with humour and satire.

In 1894, Advocate Charles Matthew Fernando wrote that chicote as a "slow and stately" music, while "kafrinha" is "faster and more boisterous" and "with a peculiar jerky movement". The word "kafrinha" itself comes from "kaf" (Kaffirs) and "rinha" which means "local lady". The Kaffirs and Portuguese Burghers mixed freely, and chicote and "kafrinha" gradually came to be known as baila, from Portuguese verb 'bailar' meaning 'to dance'.

Historically, Baila was a popular folk tradition along the coastal districts, where the Portuguese cultural influence was the strongest. These communities, mainly consisting of Portuguese traders, and the slaves that they had brought with them from the western coast of Africa, gradually combined with communities of native Sri Lankans. The musical style, now referred to as "Baila", emerged from this cultural interchange. The genre was quick to spread around the whole island of Sri Lanka and was even influenced by Cuban 'habanera' music, a form of dance music popular in the 1800s. With a history of over five hundred years, it is older than other relatively recent semi-classical traditions.

The kafirs, particularly in Puttalam, view Baila and "Kaffirinha" tradition to be as intertwined with wedding ceremonies as wine and cake. The songs are accompanied exclusively by percussion instruments. Sri Lankan Burghers (the descendants from Portuguese) are the other group of inheritors of Baila and "Kaffirinha", particularly in Baticaloa. The violin, viola, acoustic guitar and the tambourine are the accompanying instruments.

Along with some rhythmic elements, the often light-hearted comical lyrics, deceptively philosophical and the wada (debate,) baila tradition appears to be uniquely Sri Lankan. The western coast, in particular Modara and Moratuwa-Galkissa regions, are the traditional abodes of the art of Wada-Baila. The viola, mandolin, rabana as well as the harmonium and tabla were used. The trumpet and military drums such as the snare and cymbals form part of the Papare bands popular throughout the coastal districts. In addition the tavil is used when accompanying religious processions such the Kataragama and the Devinuwara temple festival.

The popular Baila singer Wally Bastiansz, who introduced the chorus to the traditional baila, is referred to as the "Father of Baila in Sri Lanka". There is a popular Baila song by Saman de Silva in tribute to him. M.S. Fernando A.K.A. "Baila Chakrawarthi" was a key figure in Sri Lankan Baila history between the 1950s and 1980s. Nithi Kanagaratnam started Baila's in Tamil in 1967 and was also the key figures in the development of the genre.

== Contemporary song ==
Today, this "kaffirhina" style (often referred to by its 6/8 time) has been adapted from violin, bongo drums and mandolin to accommodate modern instruments — specifically the electric guitar and synthesiser/workstation keyboards, octapad, bass guitar and drum kit. Due in part to this evolution, it is most often heard during parties, school reunions, charity dinner dances, hotel concerts and weddings. Contemporary Baila is also characterized by comical lyrics, often loosely adapted from themes derived from Sri Lanka's history and/or folklore.

There are four subgenres of Baila:

- Chorus song: typical Baila song.
- Waada song: this is a contest between several Baila singers, often spontaneous. Judges give them a topic and competitors must compose their own lyrics for the specific Baila rhythm. Marks are given in different criteria including quick-wittedness, meaningfulness, flow and rhyme.
- Papare Baila: instrumental baila usually played outdoors using trumpets and drums influenced by marching bands. Popular in carnivals and cricket matches, the crowd joins in by singing and dancing.
- Calypso baila: influenced by Calypso music, played typically with acoustic guitars and bongo drums.
- Bailatronic: introduced by Ranidu Lankage, by mixing baila and electronic music together.

Popular Baila artists include: M. S. Fernando, Anton Jones, Paul Fernando, Desmond de Silva, Nihal Nelson, Maxwell Mendis, Sunil Perera (The Gypsies), Saman de Silva, Dhanapala Udawaththa, Rajiv Sebastian, Claude de Zoysa, Mariazelle Goonetilleke, Nithi Kanagaratnam, A. E. Manoharan, and Dalreen Subi among others.

Baila has also influenced the music of many popular artists such as: Annesley Malewana, Clarence Wijewardene, C.T. Fernando, Anil Bharathi, Christopher Paul, Priya Peiris La Bambas, Super Golden Chimes, Los Flamingos, Sunflowers (band), The Gypsies, and even Pandit W. D. Amaradeva.

Moratuwa has produced a large number of these artists and is often referred to as the unofficial home of Baila. Gerald Wickremesooriya and his Sooriya records played a significant role to promote this genre of music. Radio broadcaster Vernon Corea promoted Baila music in the English-speaking world via the English-language programmes aired on Radio Ceylon and BBC Radio London during the late 1960s and 1970s. The Roshan Fernando foundation is a charity committed to the welfare of baila and other musicians.

In December 2006 a nonstop dance CD titled Sri Lankan Open House Party was released in Sri Lanka. The music was directed by composer Suresh Maliyadde while the music on the CD was provided by Niresh Perera (The Gypsies) on drums, Mahinda Bandara Fortunes) on guitar, Tilak Dias on bass, Tissasiri Perera on keyboard, and Visharadha Monaj Pieris on percussion. Singers who were empowering these all time evergreens are Kanishka Wijetunga, Ganesha Wijetunga, Mariazelle Goonetilleke, and Suresh Maliyadde.

There are Baila songs in Tamil, which were popularized by Nithi Kanagaratnam, Stany Sivananthan, Tobel Ragal, Kanapathipillai, Emanuel, S Ramachandran, Ceylon Manohar (A.E.Manoharan), M.P.Paramesh, Amuthan Annamalai, et al.

The Sinhala Baila song Pissu Vikare (Dagena Polkatu Male) by H. R. Jothipala, Milton Perera, M. S. Fernando is a cover version of the Tamil song Dingiri Dingale (Meenachi) from the 1958 Tamil film Anbu Engey. And it was covered again in Sinhala as a folk song named Digisi/Digiri Digare (Kussiye Badu).

== See also ==
- Music of Goa (Konkani songs similar to Baila)
