= Paul Fernando =

Sri Lankan musician (1951–2020)

Paul Fernando පෝල් ප්‍රනාන්දු
- Born: Madawela Hewage Paul Fernando; November 24, 1951; Moratuwa, Sri Lanka
- Died: November 16, 2020 (aged 68); Kalubowila, Sri Lanka
- Education: Prince of Wales' College, Moratuwa
- Occupations: Singer; composer
- Spouse: Unmarried
- Musical career
- Genres: Pop; Calypso; R&B; Baila
- Instrument: Vocals
- Years active: 1970–2017
- Labels: Sooriya; Torana; Tharanga; KND; CRS Music; Stanley's Music; Nilwala

Madawela Hewage Paul Fernando (Sinhala: පෝල් ප්‍රනාන්දු; 24 November 1951 – 16 November 2020), popularly known as Paul Fernando, was a Sri Lankan musician and a Baila singer. Often referred to as the "Prince of Baila", Fernando became one of the most popular singers in Sri Lankan western music industry. Also, he is one of the leading artists dedicated to popularizing the art of Baila in Sri Lanka.

== Personal life ==
Paul Fernando was born on 24 November 1951 in Moratuwa, Colombo, Sri Lanka as the youngest of the family. He completed education at Prince of Wales' College, Moratuwa. His father was Madawala Hewage Leon Fernando and mother was Kusumawathi Fernando. He had four elder brothers.

He died on 16 November 2020 at the age of 68 at Kalubowila Hospital after undergoing treatment for an illness for a long period.

== Career ==
An amateur singing competition was held at the Buddhist House in Moratuwa in 1969. It was a time when he was looking for opportunities to sing songs. With that focus, he applied for the Talent Sixty Nine Singing Competition where he later won the competition. That competition became the turning point in his musical career. During the competition, he met popular lyricist Priya Peiris who gave him several lyrics. Then Fernando practiced the song Sandapana Wage Obe Ruwa Dilisila. He managed to impress the fans with that song which brought him to the pinnacle of popularity.

In 1970, he released his first album. The album consisted of four songs: Sandapana Wage, Ran Samanalaya, Sudu Rosa Malak and Thoppi Velenda. He later became a permanent artist in outdoor musical stages island wide. In the same year, he took to the stage with the song Mala, Mama Oba Genama Hithala. Then in 1972, he sang the song Egoda Gode Mal Nelana Mal Ethano written by Ravi Ranasinghe and composed by Melroy Dharmaratne. Then he made the Baila hit Supun Sandak Ahase Pavuna which became very popular. On the stage, he made a sign of identity, where he sang the songs moving from one place to another rhythmically.

In a career spanning more than four decades, he made several popular Baila and fast tracks including: Golu Hadawatha Vivara Karanna, Ruwan Maliga, Egoda Gode Mal, Aawe Wana Bambarek Wage, Supun Sandak Ahase Pawuna, Demapiyan Kiyana Nisa, Pranandu Pranandu, Ran Kirilliye and Dona Kathirina. On 13 October 2013, Fernando performed in the concert 3 Po LS (3පෝLS) along with fellow Baila singers Christopher Paul and Vincent de Paul Peiris held at Bauddha Mandiraya, Moratuwa.

== Filmography ==
Year	Film	Role	Ref.
1976	Vanarayo	Playback Singer	
1983	Rathu Makara	Playback Singer	
1997	Apaye Thappara 84000k	Playback Singer	
