= Abhidhanacintamani =

Abhidhānacintāmaṇi
- Author: Hemachandra
- Language: Sanskrit
- Genre: Lexicon / Thesaurus
- Publication date: 12th Century
- Publication place: India

Abhidhānacintamani (Abhidhānacintāmaṇi) (literally "The Thought-gem of Names") is a major Sanskrit lexicon or thesaurus compiled by the 12th-century Jain scholar and polymath, Hemacandra. It is considered one of the most comprehensive and authoritative works in the tradition of Indian lexicography.

Unlike modern alphabetical dictionaries, the Abhidhānacintāmaṇi is a synonymic lexicon composed in verse, intended to be memorized by students and scholars of Sanskrit literature and philosophy.

== Structure ==
The work is divided into six sections (Kāṇḍas), categorized by the nature of the subjects they describe:

1. Devādhideva-kāṇḍa: Deals with the Jinas (the spiritual victors of Jainism).
2. Deva-kāṇḍa: Covers Hindu deities, celestial beings, and the heavens.
3. Martya-kāṇḍa: Relates to human beings, family, and society.
4. Tiryak-kāṇḍa: Focuses on animals, birds, and insects.
5. Nāraka-kāṇḍa: Concerns the underworld and hellish beings.
6. Sāmānya-kāṇḍa: Contains abstract terms, qualities, and general nouns.

Hemacandra also composed a commentary on this work titled Tattvābhidhāyinī and a supplement specifically for homonyms (words with multiple meanings) titled Anekārthasaṅgraha.

== Scholarly Significance ==
The Abhidhānacintāmaṇi is noted for its linguistic precision and its dual utility in both secular Sanskrit literature and Jain theological studies. Scholars such as Henry Thomas Colebrooke and Theodor Aufrecht brought the work to Western attention in the 19th century, recognizing it as an essential tool for understanding medieval Sanskrit texts. This text was first published by Otto Boehtlingk and Charles Rieu in 1847.

Hemacandra has cited 56 authors and 31 works in his auto-commentary Tattvābhidhāyinī. The historic significance of this commentary is immense as it compiles various Gupta-era Saṃskṛta terms for various royal posts, documents the differences in opinions among the earlier lexicons and compiles the Prākṛta- and Apabhraṃśa-influenced words.

== Commentaries and legacy ==
Some of the most prominent commentaries lexicon includes:

- Tattvābhidhāyinī auto-commentary
- Ṭīkā (commentary) by Kuśalasāgara
- Sāroddhāra/Durgapadaprabodha by Vallabhagaṇi
- Ṭīkā (commentary) by Sādhuratna
- Ṭīkā (commentary) by Cāritrasiṁhagaṇī
- Vyutpattiratnākara by Devasāgaragaṇī
- Avacūri (author unknown, 4500-verse length)
- Bījaka by three disciples of Hiravijaya
- Ratnaprabhā by Vāsudevarao Janārdana

Supplement

- Haima-Nāmamālā-Śīloñcha by Jinadevasūri
  - commentary by Vallabhagaṇī

== See also ==
- Amarakosha
- Sanskrit grammar
