= Papare =

Papare may refer to:

- Papare (music), a genre from Sri Lanka
- Silas Papare (1918–1978), Papuan–Indonesian politician and guerrilla leader
