= Wally Bastiansz =

Sri Lankan Baila singer (1914–1985)

- Also known as: Olinton Mervin Bastiansz
- Born: Ogustus Martalanus Bastiansz; June 09, 1914; Piyadigama, Galle, British Ceylon.
- Origin: Sri Lanka
- Died: 10 January 1985 (aged 70)
- Genres: Baila
- Occupation: Police officer in Traffic division
- Years active: 1940s
- Labels: HMV; Philips; Sooriya

Ogustus Martalanus Bastiansz, better known as Wally Bastiansz (Sinhala: වොලී බැස්ටියන්ස්) (June 9, 1914 - January 10, 1985) was a Sri Lankan singer who developed the style of chorus baila in the 1940s.

== Biography ==
Bastianz was a police officer attached to the traffic division. He was also an experienced guitarist, banjo player, and violinist. Drawing from his orchestral roots, he transformed the tunes of standards like "The Battle Hymn of the Republic" and "Mademoiselle from Armentières (Hinky Dinky Parlez Vous)" into classic baila songs. He is also known as the King of Sri Lankan Baila Songs.

There has always been some controversy over his name "Wally". It is very customary in Sri Lanka, even today, for children to have nicknames. Although he was baptized Ogustus Martalanus after his grandfather Wilhelmus Martalanus, in the family, amongst close relatives, and even amongst his old neighbors, Ogustus was only known as either "Olie, or Olinton". Young Ogustus was not very comfortable with his name and mostly went by his initials O.M. Bastiansz rather than Ogustus or Martalanus. After embarking on his musical adventure he aptly adapted his nickname "Olie" to be "Wally", his well-known stage name, and, for all official purposes, presented himself as Olinton Mervin Bastianz, maintaining his original initials O.M.

His songs dealt with everyday life and simple people. One of his hits ('Nurse Nona') was an ode to a nurse in a hospital and another covered the trial of jilted lover Eric Bacho. He sang several songs in English. Other songs were written by him, but later ascribed to other popular artists include Hai Hooi Babi Achchige, Yaman Bando Vesak Balanna, Ratak Watinawa, Le Kiri Karala, Irene Josephine, Kussi Amma Sera, Muhudey Yamu Masun Genenna, Weeriyen Soya, Nondi Simaiyya, Wada Kaha Sudiya, and many others.

== Family ==
It is almost an unknown fact that the nurse in his all-time favourite song "Nurse Nona" was none other than his own late sister, Felicia Florence Jayasekera (née Bastianz, died 1996) who worked as a nurse in the early 1940s. Florence gave up her nursing career in 1944 after her first child was born. In 1969 Florence and her family moved to the ancestral home of the Bastiansz family in Piyadigama, a small village about 2 km north of the coast between Galle and Gintota, to take care of their ailing father Hinton Wilmot Bastiansz.

The old Bastiansz residence in Piyadigama, where Wally Bastiansz and all his eight siblings were born, is now occupied by one of Florence's sons.

Wally Bastiansz is closely related to Sri Lankan popular artist's Kanthie & Judy de Silva. Wally was Kanthie's (Judy's mother) father Edgar de Silva's first cousin. Wally's Father Hinton Wilmot and Edgar's mother Winifred were siblings.

== Discography ==
- Sada Sulan Hamanne
- Hai Hui Babi Achchige
- Irin Josapin Rosalin
- Nondi Simayiya
- Kussi Amma Sera
- Muhude Yamu Masunmaranna
- Nonaa Mage Nurse Nonaa
- Yaman Bando Vesak Balanba
- Wadakaha Suliya
- Mata Ennaba Nana Mama Ennenaa
- Ratak Watinawa Api Maupiyo denna
- Mathakai Amme Ode Darunalawilla (Le Kiri Karala)
- Dadikala Mage Mauni
- Weeriyen Soya Apa Rakshakala Piya
- Dawasak Amma
- Seeyage Barabaage
- Kusa Raju Kawum Muhunathin (Aale)
- Kusa Raju Kawum
- Puruwe Pinakina
- Rata Wanasana (Kelam)
- Ruwata Hadata Penunoth
- Sirilak Diwayina
- Yanne Oba Koibada
- Suranganawiye
- Aale Aale
- Wadaka Bariya
- Duppath Mawu Kenek
- Govi Palpatha
- Waduwa
- Girawada Giraweeda
- Ranwan Karal
- Modaya
- Dutusihinaya
- Banjo Raban
- Ape Seeya
- Wena Saththu
- Kanabona Podi Kosata Meeyek
- Sooda Madiwela Arakku Soor Wediwela
- Api dannawa malli
- Watapita Bohoma Denek Sitinne
- Wareln Machang Salli Athitharam
- Goviya
- Yanne Oba Koyibada
- Mithura Kiuwama
