= Prabhācandra =

Jain monk, Śvetāmbara monk, grammarian, philosopher, and author

Acharya Prabhācandra

Personal life
- Born: 11th century CE
- Died: 11th century CE

Religious life
- Religion: Jainism
- Sect: Śvetāmbara

Prabhācandra (c. 11th century CE) was a Śvetāmbara monk, grammarian, biographer, philosopher and author of several philosophical books on Jainism.

== Life ==
Prabhachandra was a Śvetāmbara monk who flourished in 11th century CE.

Prabhāvakacarita is a Jain text devoted to history, composed by him. While Prabhāvakacarita is dedicated to the lives of Jain scholars of the Shvetambara tradition, it is often quoted in the context of contemporary history, often dealing with the time of Acharya Hemachandra. It is a major source of the information on the society in that era. Prabhāvakacarita includes a mention of use a parachute in ancient India.

According to him, Kumarapala converted to Jainism and started worshipping Ajitanatha after conquering Ajmer.

== Works ==
- Prabhavaka Charita (IAST: Prabhavakacarita): Biographies of Jain monks Prabhachandra gives accounts of acharyas from the first century of the Vikram era to 13th century, concluding with the account of Hemachandra. It gives an account of 22 acharyas, including Vajraswami, Kalaka, Haribhadra, Bapabhatti, Manatunga, Mahendra Suri (which includes an account of poet Dhanapala) and Hemachandra. It concludes by including a prashati of the author himself.
