= Nihal Nelson =

Sri Lankan singer and composer (1946–2022)

- නිහාල් නෙල්සන්
- Born: 9 January 1946; Moratuwa, British Ceylon
- Died: 13 December 2022 (aged 76); Moratuwa, Sri Lanka
- Education: Rawathawaththa Methodist College; Moratu Maha Vidyalaya
- Occupations: Singer, songwriter, musician
- Spouse: Malini Sriyalatha (m. 1974; died 2020)
- Children: 1
- Awards: Moratu Puthra Abhimani
- Musical career
- Genres: Pop; soul; rhythm and blues; Baila
- Instrument: Vocals
- Years active: 1963–2022
- Labels: DKRS, Torana, Nilwala, Tharanga

Nihal Nelson (Sinhala: නිහාල් නෙල්සන්; 9 January 1946 – 13 December 2022) was a Sri Lankan vocalist, songwriter and composer. One of the most influential singers in Sri Lanka, and considered 'undefeated on the concert stage', Nelson holds the record for the most albums recorded by a Sri Lankan artist, at a total of 113.

== Personal life ==
Nelson was born in Moratuwa on 9 January 1946 as the only child in the family. His father, D.C. Hendrick was a businessman and his mother, D.P Weerawardena was an English teacher.

He started primary education at Innocent Maria Mixed School (now known as Rawathawaththa Roman Catholic College). After passing grade 8, he entered Moratu Maha Vidyalaya where he completed his GCE Advanced Level schooling in 1960. It was here that he began to focus on making music.

Nelson married Malini Sriyalatha, the second in a family of four, on 16 May 1974. The couple have one son, Kanchana Tharanga, who was born on 10 January 1978 and works as a radio sound administrator. Nelson's wife Malini died in July 2020.

== Career ==
Nelson was popular on the school stage as well as in Moratuwa as a singer. However, he had to polish his musical ability to enter the music world. During this period, he met Sarath Munasinghe (now a monk, Meegahawela Sumanashantha Thero) who had written many songs. In 1962 during a wedding, he met popular musician A. J. Kareem, who introduced him to composer R. A. Chandrasena. Nelson's first recording Lassanata Pipunu Wanamal, written by Munasinghe, was released in SLBC as an EP on 31 March 1963 under the guidance of Chandrasena. Later, he joined Kandy Lake Club with Chandrasena.

Nelson was among the first Sri Lankan vocalists to release a cassette in 1978 with Gune Ayyage Kamare. The release was on Wijaya Ramanayake's Tharanga label, which introduced the format to Sri Lanka. Nelson was also among the first to release a compact disc in the region.

Nelson's 110th album Nihal 110 Dot Com was released in 2000. It was recorded at Sunflowers Studios in Mahawewa, Chilaw, with Neil Warnakulasooriya conducting and music by the Sunflowers. At this point Nelson had been singing on the concert stage for 55 consecutive years.

He also worked as a playback singer for many films. His maiden playback singing came through the film Pem Kurullo with the song "Kasii Basili Na". It was written by Chandradasa Fernando and the music was composed by Tony Weeratunga. He then did playback for the films Sakvithi Suwaya, Loka Horu, Rodaya, Hari Yanakota Ohoma Thamai, Sanda Wata Rantharu, Loku Thaththa, Mal Warusa, Valampuri, and Diyamanthi. He also sang a song called Hitha Honda Minihage for Gamini Fonseka.

On 15 March 2013, a "50 years old, Nihal Awith" concert was held at the Musaeus College Auditorium to celebrate his 50 years of singing. In 2015, Nelson was awarded the 'Moratupura Ratnavibhushana' award.

== Death ==
On 13 December 2022, Nelson died in his residence after suffering a heart attack, at age 76.

== Legacy ==
In January 2021, it was announced that the third lane of his hometown, Rawathawatte, Moratuwa, would be named after the veteran singer.
