= Prabhavakacarita =

Prabhāvakacarita
- Life of the Prominent

Information
- Religion: Jainism
- Author: Prabhācandra
- Language: Saṃskṛta
- Chapters: 22 Prabandhas
- Verses: 5704

Prabhāvakacarita (Life of the Prominent) is a Jaina text devoted to history, composed by Prabhācandra, an acarya of the Śvetāmbara tradition of Jainism in 1277–78. While Prabhāvakacarita is dedicated to the lives of Jain monks of the Śvetāmbara tradition, it is often quoted in the context of classical and medieval history, often dealing with the time of Acharya Hemachandra. As a historic text, this work serves as a major source of the information on the society in that era. Prabhāvakacarita includes a mention of use a parachute in ancient India.

Prabhācandra was inspired from the Pariśiṣṭaparva, an appendix to Triśaṣṭiśalākāpuruṣacarita by Hemacandrasūri to compose a work that encompasses the lives of Jaina monks prominently and the kings, statesmen, associated or belonging from 1st century C. E. to 12th century C. E. This work has been corrected by Pradyumnasūri, disciple of Kanakaprabhasūri. Prabhachandra gives accounts of acāryas from the first century of the Vikrama era to 13th century, concluding with the account of Hemachandra. It gives an account of 22 ācārya, including Vajrasvāmī, Kālaka, Haribhadra, Bapabhatti, Mānatuṅga, Mahendrasūri (which includes an account of poet Dhanapāla) and Hemachandra. It concludes by including a praśasti of the author himself.

== Contents & Structure ==
This work is divided into 22 prabandhas divided on basis of lives of each personality. It contains 5704 verses prominently in Anuṣṭubh metre.

1. Ārya Vajrasvāmī (also contains account of Ārya Khapuṭācārya)
2. Ārya Rakṣitasūri
3. Ārya Nandila
4. Kālakasūri
5. Pādaliptasūri (also contains accounts of Rudradevasūri, Śramaṇasiṃhasūri, Ārya Khapaṭa, Mahendra Upādhyāya and Nāgārjuna Siddha)
6. Vijayasiṃhasūri
7. Jīvadevasūri
8. Ācārya Vṛddhavādī (also contains accounts of Siddhasena Divākara and king Vikramāditya)
9. Ācārya Mallavādī
10. Haribhadrasūri
11. Bappabhaṭṭisūri (contains accounts of king Yaśovarman, Āma and poet Vākpatirāja)
12. Mānatuṅgasūri (also contains accounts of Saṃskṛta poets Bāṇabhaṭṭa and Mayūra)
13. Mānadevasūri
14. Mahākavi Siddharṣi
15. Vīragaṇī
16. ‘Vādivetāla’ Śāntisūri (also contains accounts of Bhoja)
17. Mahendrasūri (also contains accounts of Dhanapāla, Śobhana and poet Kaula)
18. Sūrācārya (also contains accounts of Jineśvarasūri and Buddhisāgarasūri)
19. Abhayadevasūri
20. Vīrācārya
21. Vādī Devasūri
22. Hemacandrasūri (also contains accounts of Siddharāja Jayasiṃha, Kumārapāla)

== Editions ==
- Prabhāvakcaritra by Candraprabhasūri, Ed. by Hīrānanda M. Sharma, Published by Nirnay Sagar Press – 1909
- Prabhāvakacarita by Prabhācandrasūri, Ed. by Jinavijaya, Published in Singhi Jain Series no. 13 – 1940

== Translations ==
- Gujarati Translation published by Atmamand Sabha, Bhavnagar – 1930 (based on Nirnay Sagar edition)
- Hindi Translation by Dr. Shreeranjan Suridev, Published by Research Institute of Prakrit, Jainology and Ahimsa – 2013 (based on Singhi Jain Series edition)

== Bibliography ==
- Prabhācandra. Prabhāvakacarita, ed. Jinavijaya, Ahmedabad/Calcutta, 1940.
