= Anbu Engey =

1958 film directed by D. Yoganand

- Theatrical release poster
- Directed by: D. Yoganand
- Screenplay by: Rajendra
- Story by: Murasoli Maran
- Produced by: V. Govindarajan
- Starring: S. S. Rajendran; Pandari Bai; K. Balaji; S. V. Ranga Rao
- Cinematography: B. S. Selvaraj
- Edited by: R. Rajan
- Music by: Vedha
- Production company: Jubilee Films
- Release date: 12 December 1958
- Running time: 142 minutes
- Country: India
- Language: Tamil

Anbu Engey (transl. Where is love?) is a 1958 Indian Tamil-language drama film, directed by D. Yoganand and produced by V. Govindarajan. The story and dialogues were written by Murasoli Maran, and the screenplay by Rajendra. The film stars S. S. Rajendran, K. Balaji, Pandari Bai and S. V. Ranga Rao, with Devika, T. R. Ramachandran, Manorama and Mynavathi in supporting roles. It was released on 12 December 1958.

== Cast ==
- S. S. Rajendran as Somu
- K. Balaji as Ramu
- Pandari Bai as Amudha, Ramu's wife
- S. V. Ranga Rao as Masilamani Mudaliar
- Devika as Parvathi
- T. R. Ramachandran as Appavu
- Mynavathi as Kamu
- Manorama in guest appearance
- V. S. Raghavan in guest appearance
- S. A. Ashokan in guest appearance
- Suriyakala as Mala
- Lakshmi Prabha as Alamelu
- S. D. Subbulakshmi as Amudha's mother

== Soundtrack ==
The music was composed by Vedha, with lyrics written by Pattukkottai Kalyanasundaram, Kannadasan, Thanjai N. Ramaiah Dass, Vindhan and V. Seetharaman.

The two songs Melay Parakkum Rockettu and Dingiri Dingale (the songs with Baila music, which in turn was influenced by Portuguese music) topped the charts. The song Dingiri Dingale (Meenachi) was covered in Sinhala as Pissu Vikare (Dagena Polkatu Male) by H. R. Jothipala, Milton Perera, M. S. Fernando. And it was covered again in Sinhala as a folk song named Digisi/Digiri Digare (Kussiye Badu). The song Dingiri Dingale was recreated by Sulaiman Kakkodan for the 2021 Malayalam film Kurup.

| Song | Singers | Lyrics | Length |
|---|---|---|---|
| "Melae Parakkum Rockettu" | K. Jamuna Rani | Thanjai N. Ramaiah Dass | 03:28 |
| "Amirtha Yogam" | T. M. Soundararajan & P. Leela | Thanjai N. Ramaiah Dass | 03:17 |
| "Kadhal Endral Enna" | K. Jamuna Rani | Thanjai N. Ramaiah Dass | 02:58 |
| "Kaayaa Pazhamaa Sollu Raajaa" | Radha Jayalakshmi | Thanjai N. Ramaiah Dass | 01:45 |
| "Poovil Vandu" | A. M. Rajah & K. Jamuna Rani | Thanjai N. Ramaiah Dass | 03:10 |
| "Aana Aavanna" | K. Jamuna Rani | Pattukottai Kalyanasundaram | 03:16 |
| "Sollu Nee Raajaa" | R. Balasaraswathi Devi | Vindhan | 01:46 |
| "Ethanai Kodi Panam" | P. Suseela | Kannadasan | 03:45 |
| "Dingiri Dingale" | T. M. Soundararajan | V. Seetharaman | 04:52 |

Pedda Kodalu (Telugu) songs

The music was composed by M. Ranga Rao. Lyrics were by Narapa Reddy. The musical compositions for the songs in both languages are identical.

| Song | Singers | Length |
|---|---|---|
| "Mintiki Povu Rockettu" | K. Jamuna Rani | 03:28 |
| "Amruthayogam Vache" | P. B. Sreenivas & S. Janaki | 03:17 |
| "Aashanindenela Adhiganchu" | K. Jamuna Rani | 02:58 |
| "Naa Valganuleganchi Bhavinchenu" | S. Janaki | 01:45 |
| "Poovuluvanchu Mohamuninchu" | Mrutyumjaya Reddy & K. Jamuna Rani | 03:10 |
| "Antha Levandi Enno Cheyandi" | K. Rani | 03:16 |
| "Vennelaradha Vedanelena" | R. Balasaraswathi Devi | 01:46 |
| "Lakshalu Vunna Phalamanukoku" | P. Susheela | 03:45 |
| "Dingiri Dingale" | P. B. Sreenivas | 04:52 |
