= Sooriya Records =

- Parent company: Wickremesooriya & Co. Colombo (Private) Ltd.
- Founded: 1968
- Founder: Gerald Wickremesooriya
- Distributor: The Children's Bookshop
- Genre: Various (Sinhala pop, Western pop, Tamil pop, Baila, Light Classical, Traditional Folk, Traditional Drums, Theatre music etc.)
- Country of origin: Sri Lanka
- Official website: www.sooriya.lk

Sooriya Records Sinhala: සූරිය is a Sri Lankan record label founded by Gerald and Dulcie Wickremesooriya in 1968.

== History ==
The Children’s Bookshop, started in 1959 located near the Fort Clock Tower at No. 20, Queens Street, originated as a store for children's books and later on extended to selling children's records. Gerald Wickremesooriya eventually began importing EP discs of famous singers and bands like Jim Reeves, Beatles which then led to producing records on own under the record label: "Sooriya".

== Artists & releases ==
"The Moonstones" were the first band to record on the newly established Sooriya label in 1968 with the EP "More Hits by The Moonstones" bearing the catalogue number CHB001. Similarly, Dharmaratne Brothers hit the popular "Varsity Kollo", and Mendis Foursome along with Maxwell Mendis hit "Swarna Hamuwuwe". Veteran Saxophonist Stanley Peiris first recorded his music on Sooriya which became the first instrumental record of Sinhala Pop in Sri Lanka.

Gerald Wickremesooriya's residence at 5, Sea Avenue in Colombo was the location for weekly auditions where talents were discovered. Golden Chimes, Super Golden Chimes, The Three Sisters, Stanley Peiris and The Fortunes, M.S Fernando, Paul Fernanado, Shiromi Fernando, Samanalayo, La Bambas, Los Flamencos, Desmond De Silva, Dalrene Arnolda, Noeline Honter, Claude and the Sensations, Winslow Six, A.E. Manoharan, Priya Suriyasena, Eranga and Priyanga, Spitfires, Milton Mallawarachchi, and many more owe their stardom and fame in pop music to Sooriya.

Sooriya produced many hits like "Dilhani", "Gonwassa", "Ramani", "Muhudu Ralla", "Kalu Kella Mamai", "Maala", "Paan Mama", "Kimada Naave", "Cock-a-Doodle-Doo", "Durakathanaya", "Call Me Fisherman", "City of Colombo", "Sakala Bujang", "Konda Namagena", "Roshi", "Bohoma Bayauna", "Kandasuriduni", "Podi Nona", and Victor Ratnayake's "SA".

The Children's Bookshop was one of the most popular hangouts in Colombo Fort especially during the lunch hours where evergreen artists like Wally Bastian and Clarence Wijewardena often visited.

== Sooriya Show ==
Sooriya went on with a weekly radio programme "The Sooriya Show" as well as with the always "Sold Out" Sooriya live concerts.

Sooriya CHB LP 1 featuring "The Sooriya Show" was the first Sinhala LP released in Sri Lanka.

== Special contributions ==
As much as Sooriya was Gerald and Dulcie Wickremesooriya, Vijaya Corea was an integral part of building Sooriya and Sinhala pop music. "Without Vijaya, there wouldn’t be Sooriya" is often said by Gerald Wickremesooriya.

Mervyn Rodrigo, the recording engineer at Sarasavi Studio Kelaniya where most recordings were done and A.M. Harischandra who designed the sleeves of most records and cassettes were also important figures of this era.

== See also ==
- Vijaya Corea
- Clarence Wijewardene
- Dharmaratne Brothers
- Wally Bastian
- Annesley Malewana
- La Bambas
