= Gerald Wickremesooriya =

- Born: Gerald Wickremesooriya; 22 March 1920; Ambalangoda
- Died: 9 January 2006 (aged 85–86)
- Occupation: Record producer
- Known for: Sooriya Record Label

Gerald Wickremesooriya (Sinhala: ජෙරල්ඩ් වික්‍රමසූරිය; 1920 – 9 January 2006) was the founder of the Sooriya Record label that produced many popular hits from the late 1960s to the early 1980s.

== Personal life ==
Gerald Wickremesooriya was born in 1920 at Ambalangoda, Sri Lanka. After his early education at Dharmasoka College Ambalangoda, he completed his education at S. Thomas' College, Mt. Lavinia.

Gerald pursued interests in Agriculture travelling every weekend to his estates located in southern Sri Lanka. Due to partial blindness, Gerald, driven by his wife in their Austin A 40 would not only walk every inch of his fields but on Sunday's sell vegetables grown in his back yard at Colpetty, at the weekly Jathika Pola, held at Bullers Road, Colombo 07, Sri Lanka.

== Early years ==
In 1948 Gerald started his career in the Plantation sector by joining EPA Bogala Estates Ltd. He ventured into his own business “The Children’s Bookshop” in 1959. Originally dealing in the sale and distribution of Children's books, he went on to sell vinyl records, which eventually led him to his next venture: The Sooriya Record label.

With his natural ability to play instruments by ear Gerald played the Esraj in the orchestra of Ananda Samarakoon.

== Accomplishments ==
Wickremesooriya popularized Sinhala pop music amongst a widely western speaking audience. He was able to recognize and pick talent and transform them into stars in the Sinhala Pop scene: Golden Chimes, Mendis Foursome along with Maxwell Mendis, Stanley Peiris and The Fortunes and produced countless hit songs for which Sooriya is well known today.

Gerald lobbied and wrote articles in the newspapers supporting artiste's and their creations when popular songs were banned by the then Radio Ceylon considering this music “Thuppahi music”: unsuitable for the intellect.

He was bold enough to produce Tamil pop music when it was not in vogue. He fused instruments used in Hindu temple rituals with electrified music of the Sinhala pop idiom, synthesized the sounds of local Drum Rhythms with that of a symphony written by Winston Jayawardena, recorded and produced Nurthi Gee (songs of the old Sinhala theatre) and brought to life Tower Hall music in an era when this music was unheard amongst the public.

Gerald pioneered in offering royalties for music creators under the Intellectual Property Rights in Sri Lanka's music industry, which was unheard of in the 1980s.

The weekly Sooriya radio show and live concerts featuring the stars of the Sooriya label were one of the most popular and sought after shows in the country. The “Sooriya Show” in 1974 was produced by Gerald on a floating stage at the St. Joseph's swimming pool which had shadow dancing basing dancers on the diving boards of the pool.

== Late career ==
A secret in his life was that Gerald was blind in one eye, due to a sports accident in his mid-teens. Gerald lost his vision completely in 1981 due to a failed cataract operation. He contributed to the Sri Lanka Council for the Blind, while his wife Dulcie continued to look after the interests of Sooriya.

Gerald Wickremesooriya died on 9 January 2006 at the age of 86.

== See also ==
- Sooriya Records
- Vijaya Corea
- Clarence Wijewardena
- Wally Bastian
- Dharmaratne Brothers
