= Dhanapala Udawaththa =

Sri Lankan singer

Dhanapala Udawatta ධනපාල උඩවත්ත
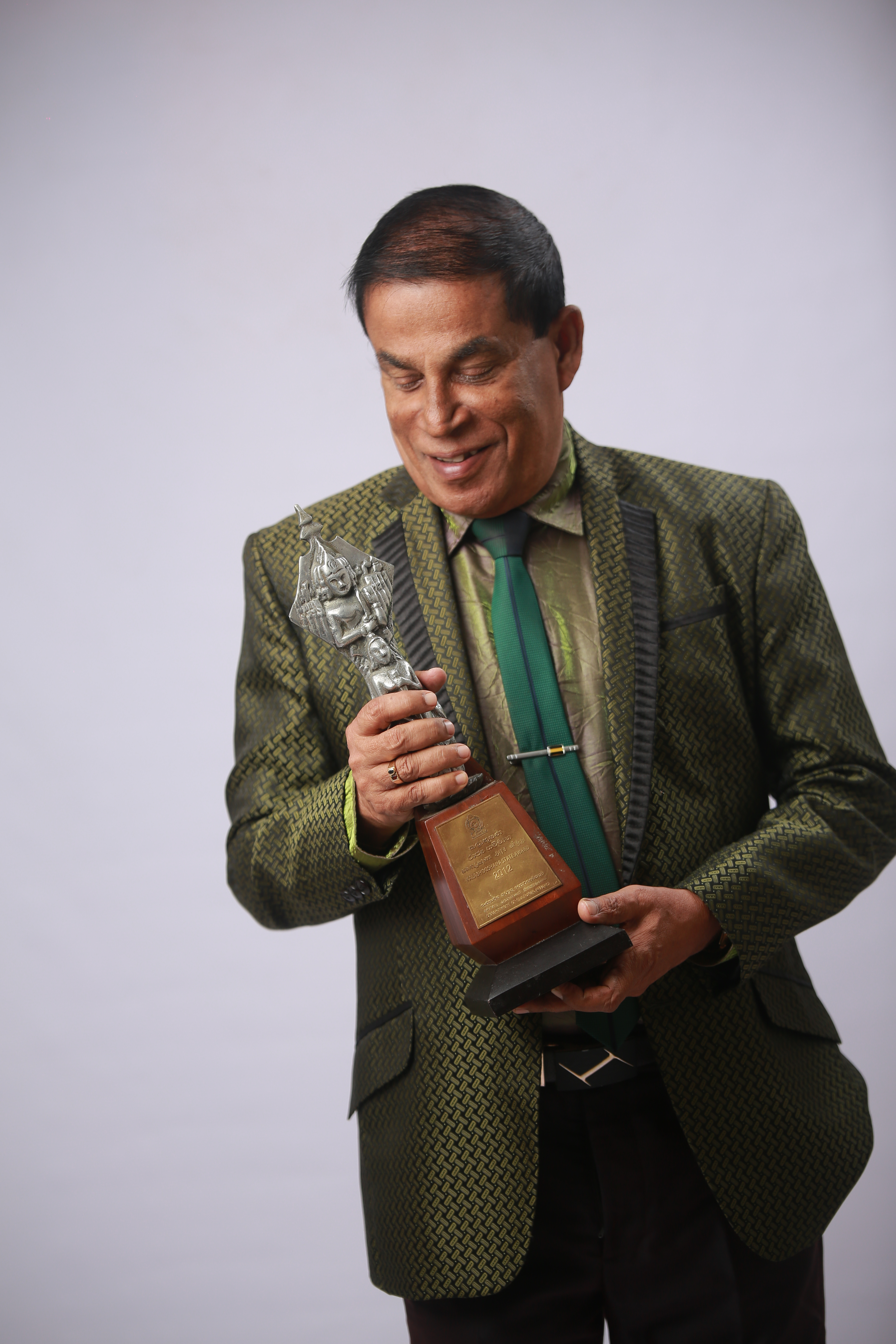
- Dhanapala Udawaththa in 2022
- Born: Thelge Wayaman Peiris; 1 November; Moratuwa, Sri Lanka
- Education: Sri Sunandopananda Vidyalaya
- Occupations: Singer, justice of the peace
- Spouse: Shiromi Damayanthi de Silva
- Children: 2
- Awards: Kala Bhushana; Kolomtota Bhushana
- Musical career
- Genres: Pop; soul; rhythm and blues; Baila
- Instrument: Vocals
- Years active: 1965–present
- Labels: Sisara; Nilwala; Ransilu

Kala Bhushana Thelge Wayaman Peiris (Sinhala: ධනපාල උඩවත්ත; born 1 November), popularly known by stage name Dhanapala Udawatta, is a Sri Lankan singer. An indispensable singer on the outdoor stage, Udawaththa has been able to show his talents and sang several popular baila songs such as Ae Neela Warala, Ma Adaraneeya Mage Amma Wethatai, Man Italiye Thani Una, Nelum Wile Nelum Nelana and Ranga Nadeeka.

== Personal life ==
Udawatta was born on 8 November in Egoda Uyana, Moratuwa as the eldest of the family. He was educated at Egoda Uyana junior school and then in Egoda Uyana Sri Sunandopananda Vidyalaya. His father Thelge Edwin Peiris was a popular theater actor. His mother Muthuthanthrige Evelyn Cooray was a housewife. Dhanapala is also a justice in peace.

Udawaththa is married to Shiromi Damayanthi de Silva from Batapola, Ambalangoda. When Udawaththa went to a concert in Batapola in 1990, a girl came up to me on stage and asked to sing the song Ae Neela Varala Peerala. Later they became friends and exchanged letters for a long time. Then the friendship turned to love and he married her. The couple has two sons – Gayan Udawatta and Shameen Udawatta.

Eldest son Gayan is also a popular singer who follows in his father's footsteps as well as a sound administrator. He completed education from Prince of Wales College, Moratuwa and studied music up to G.C.E O/L. Later he did A/L in Commerce and completed a degree in sound management. He currently works as a sound administrator for the Gypsies band. Meanwhile, he formed the band 'Plus Minus'.

== Career ==
During school days, he sang songs sung by Rukmani Devi and Indrani Wijebandara. At the age of 13, he had the opportunity to play a character called 'Udawaththa Mudalali' in a stage play held at school. He won the best actor award at the school level and then everyone called him 'Udawaththa'. He had the opportunity to pass the GCE Ordinary Level Examination and obtain a high pass in music under the guidance of Anura Mahanama.

Then he continued to sing baila songs with fellow singers. His first song was his own production composed after the Bandarawela Dowa bus accident. In 1968–70, Udawaththa made his first cassette tape under the label 'Sisara' produced by Sing Lanka, which included 14 songs. One of the songs, Kaiyi Mihiri Katha composed by R A Chandrasena and wrote by Saman Chandranath Weerasinghe. Since then, the song is still popular among fans. In 1970, he sang the song Ae Neela Varala Peerala.

In 1980, he received a song written by a songwriter named Hector Wijesiri. The song was written as Ma Adaraniya Mage Amma Wethatai. At that time war was raging in Sri Lanka and he thought this was the best time to sing this song. Because at that time there were no such war hero songs. But he did not record the song on the day it was supposed to be recorded. This was because the second and fourth lines did not touch his mind. He changed the two lines and showed it to Hector. Two or three times he read the two lines Udawaththa had written and he rolled up the paper and knocked it to the ground and said ‘I will never write songs for you again’ came out of the studio. However, Udawaththa later recorded the song, which is the first song composed for war heroes in Sri Lanka. The song sung for the encouragement of war heroes in the country. However, he has not been praised by any government for singing such a devotional song. He has sung over 1,500 songs of various genres for 28 cassettes.

During the July 83 riots, Udawaththa went for an outdoor musical show. Suddenly a stranger approached him and told that two people on the other side of the stage were looking forward to meeting him. Udawaththa went to see those two men with their faces covered with a black cloth. One of them held a gun to his head and said that he would kill him if Udawaththa sang the song Ma Adaraniya Mage. Totally horrified by that incident, that day he sang the song Ae Neela Warala five times to that shock. Finally the guitarist whispered and said he sang it five times. On another day in Bahrain, while Udawaththa was singing that song Ma Adaraniya Mage, a large glass bottle was brought on stage by former LTTE supporters.

In 1993, he became an A-grade baila singer on the Sri Lanka Broadcasting Corporation (SLBC), ranking first out of eighty-eight participants. After that he was invited to sing for the films Sathweni Dawasa and Jeewanthi. At that time he also joined amateur bands as a regulatory singer. Later he performed two solo concerts called 'Suranganavi' and 'Nelum Vile'. Meanwhile, Udawatte made the songs about almost all the special events that took place in the Sri Lanka including Aranthala LTTE attack, Indira Gandhi incident, Hasalaka Gamini, Bandaranaike assassination case, Upali Wijewardene disappearance case, Ahungalla incident and Rishana Nafiq murder case. Through it, he was able to educate the society and get a lot of attention for each story.

On 27 June 2015, he performed a 'Dhanapala Udawatta Live in Concert with Plus Minus' at 6.00 pm at Panadura Town Hall to celebrate fifty years of his music career. It was the third solo concert performed by him. Udawaththa also sang a song attached to a series of films made in the country. He sang the first political song, Kathira Paara, as well as the first tribute song sung to Malini Fonseka.
