= Bhaktāmara Stotra =

Jain Sanskrit prayer

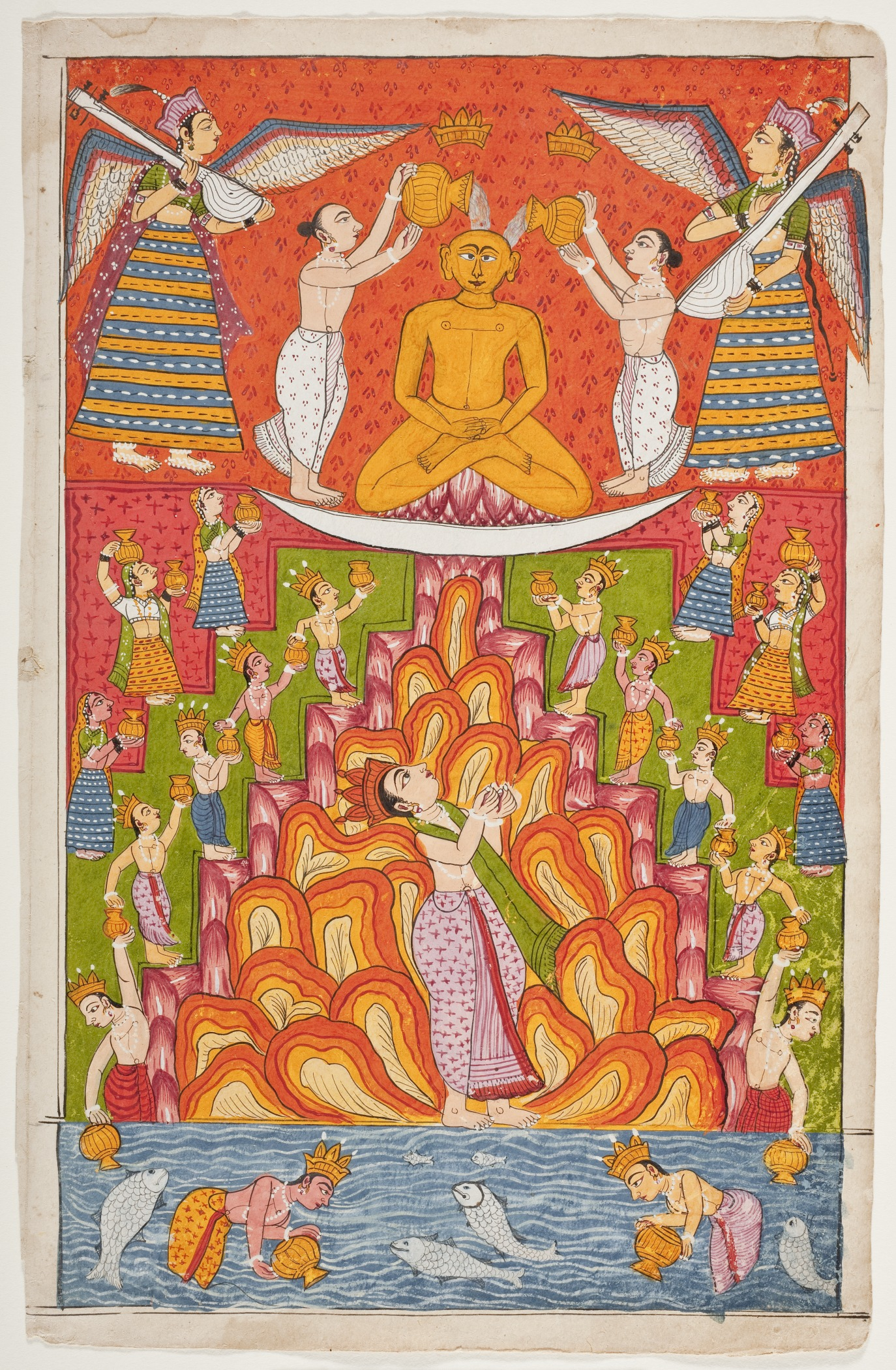
- Illustration of Rishabhanatha in a manuscript of Bhaktāmara Stotra

Information
- Religion: Jainism
- Author: Acharya Manatunga
- Language: Sanskrit
- Period: 7th century CE
- Verses: 48 (originally 52) Verses as per the Digambara Sect and 44 Verses (Originally as per ancient scriptures) as per the Shwetambara Sect

The Bhaktāmara Stotra (Sanskrit: भक्तामरस्तोत्र, romanized: bhaktāmara-stotra, lit. 'Hymn of an immortal devotee') is a Jain religious hymn (stotra) written in Sanskrit. It was authored by Manatunga (7th century CE). The Digambaras believe it has 48 verses while Śvetāmbaras believe it consists of 44 verses.

The hymn praises Rishabhanatha, the first Tirthankara of Jainism in this time cycle.

== History and authorship ==
The authorship of the Bhaktāmara Stotra is universally attributed to the Jain monk Manatunga. However, the historical reconstruction of his life is heavily obscured by medieval sectarian legends, requiring modern scholars to separate the traditional hagiography surrounding the text's composition from its actual historical dating.

=== Legend of composition ===
According to medieval Jain hagiographies, the Bhaktāmara Stotra was composed under miraculous circumstances. While Śvetāmbara and Digambara accounts vary in specific details, the core narrative revolves around Manatunga being imprisoned by a powerful monarch, frequently identified in later chronicles as King Bhoja. According to texts like the 1305 CE Śvetāmbara Prabandha-Chintamani, the king sought to test the mantric powers of Jain ascetics against those of his Hindu court poets, Bāṇabhaṭṭa and Mayūrabhaṭṭa, who had allegedly performed divine physical miracles.

When Manatunga refused to demonstrate his spiritual powers on royal command, declaring his ascetic detachment from worldly affairs, the infuriated king had him bound in heavy iron chains and locked in a dungeon. In deep devotion, Manatunga composed the Bhaktāmara Stotra in praise of Rishabhanatha, the first tirthankara. The legend asserts that with the recitation of each stanza, one of his physical restraints miraculously shattered. This resulted in the breaking of 44 chains in the Śvetāmbara tradition and 48 chains in the Digambara tradition. Witnessing this profound display of mantric power, the king supposedly surrendered at the monk's feet, establishing the superiority of Jain devotion.

=== Historical dating ===
Modern Indologists and historians universally reject the medieval legend's timeline, placing Manatunga firmly in the early 7th century CE. Linguistic analysis pioneered by scholars such as Hermann Jacobi confirms that the hymn's sophisticated Vasantatilakā meter perfectly matches the classical Sanskrit kāvya style of the 7th-century post-Gupta period, ruling out later medieval authorship. Furthermore, the rival poets mentioned in the core legend—Bāṇabhaṭṭa and Mayūrabhaṭṭa—were historically verified contemporaries of King Harsha of Kannauj (r. 606–647 CE), aligning Manatunga exactly with Harsha's 7th-century era.

Consequently, the association with "King Bhoja" is recognized by scholars as a deliberate historical anachronism. The famous Paramara King Bhoja of Malwa ruled in the 11th century (c. 1010–1055 CE), approximately four centuries after Manatunga's life. Historians conclude that medieval Jain chroniclers, writing centuries later, intentionally relocated the 7th-century ascetic into the court of the 11th-century Paramara king. Because King Bhoja was revered across India as the ultimate Hindu scholar-king, he served as the strongest possible literary foil to demonstrate the triumph of Jain asceticism over royal authority. Unverified claims associating Manatunga with the legendary Vikramaditya or the Navaratnas are similarly dismissed by modern scholarship as hagiographical conflations.

Furthermore, there is no contemporary 7th-century archaeological or epigraphic evidence corroborating Manatunga's imprisonment. The earliest known physical inscription recording the chain-breaking legend is the Mallishena Epitaph at Shravanabelagola, carved in 1128 CE. Modern epigraphists and scholars point to this approximately 500-year gap between Manatunga's life and the inscription, viewing the epitaph not as contemporary proof of the event, but as retrospective hagiography demonstrating when the mythology was formally institutionalized in stone.

== Structure and sectarian variations ==
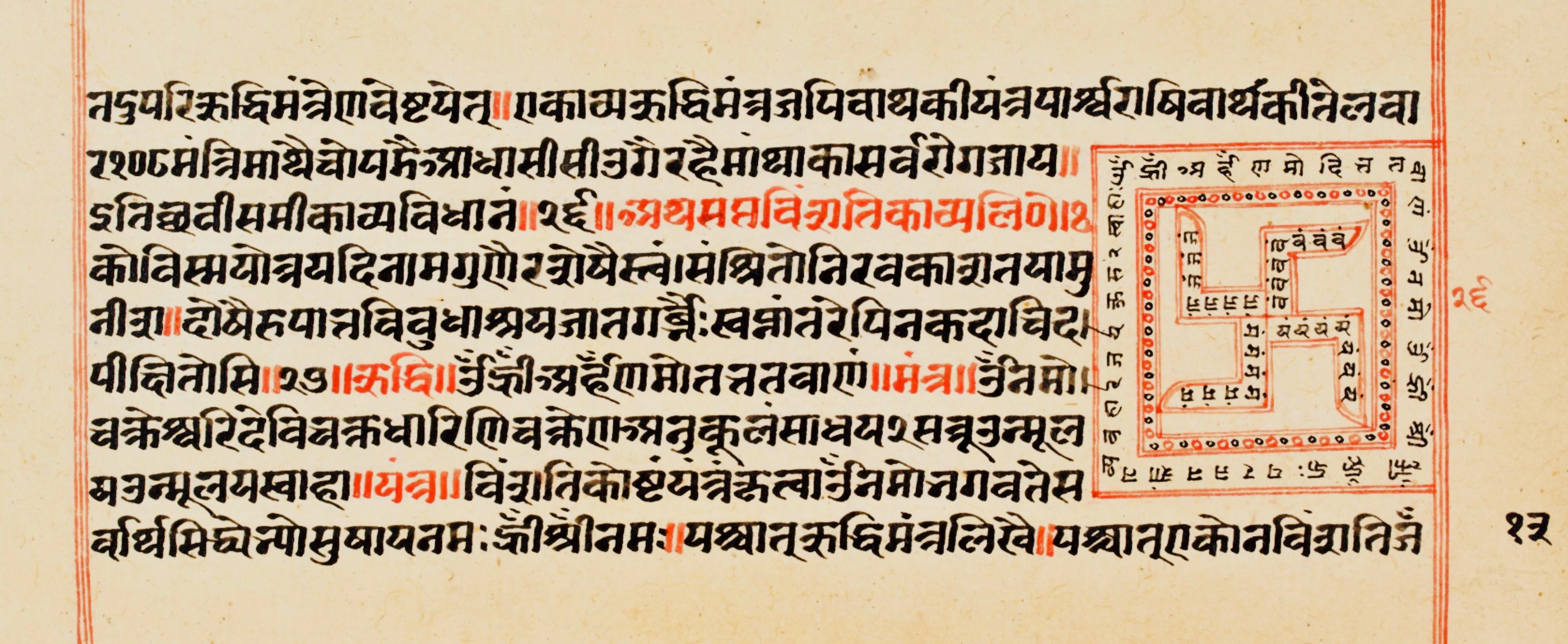
Photo of Bhaktāmara Stotra manuscript- now owned and preserved by the British Library (Manuscript ID: Or 13741)

=== Poetic structure and theme ===
The Bhaktāmara Stotra is a classical Sanskrit hymn (stotra) composed in the highly ornate kāvya style. The entire text is structured using the complex Vasantatilakā meter, a classical rhythmic pattern consisting of exactly 14 syllables per quarter-verse (pāda). Thematically, the hymn functions as an elaborate panegyric dedicated to Rishabhanatha (also known as Adinatha), the first tirthankara of the current Jain cosmic time cycle. Rather than petitioning the tirthankara for worldly intervention, the structural focus of the poem is entirely oriented around praising Rishabhanatha's supreme spiritual detachment, infinite knowledge, and victory over inner passions.

=== The sectarian divide ===
A fundamental division exists between the Śvetāmbara and Digambara traditions regarding the canonical length of the text. The Śvetāmbara sect formally recognizes and recites a 44-verse recension of the hymn. This exact number corresponds directly to their hagiographical tradition, which asserts that Manatunga was bound by 44 iron chains that were broken one by one as he composed each stanza.

In contrast, the Digambara sect recognizes and recites a 48-verse recension. Digambara liturgy strictly adheres to this longer version to align with their sectarian legend, which claims Manatunga was secured in a dungeon by 48 distinct locks.

=== Scholarly consensus on interpolations ===
Modern Indological and linguistic analyses strongly conclude that the 44-verse Śvetāmbara recension represents the original, historically older core of the text. The pioneering Indologist Hermann Jacobi, who conducted the first critical linguistic analysis of the hymn, concluded that the extra verses found in the Digambara version (specifically verses 32, 33, 34, and 35) are later interpolations.

Scholars suggest these four verses were artificially inserted by medieval Digambara redactors to extend the text to 48 verses—a number that holds prominent ritual and geometric significance in later Digambara tantric and mantric traditions. Because the structural and linguistic integrity of the poem is complete at 44 verses, Śvetāmbara institutions generally exclude the interpolated verses from their formal daily liturgy, or solely include them as uncanonical appendices in modern printed editions.

== Influence ==
Bhaktāmara Stotra has influenced other Jain prayers, such as the Kalyānamandira Stotra, devoted to the twenty-third tirthankara, and the Svayambhu Stotra, devoted to all the twenty-four Tirthankaras. Additional verses here praise the omniscience of Adinatha.

Bhaktāmara Stotra is widely illustrated in paintings. A 1332 CE palm leaf manuscript of the stotra illustrating only the 44 verses (as believed by Śvetāmbaras) is well-preserved at the Patan library. It is considered to be the oldest surviving manuscript.

At the Sanghiji temple at Sanganer, there is a panel illustrating each verse. There is a temple at Bharuch with a section dedicated to the Bhaktāmara Stotra and its author Manatunga.

Devotees believe that the verses of Bhaktāmara Stotra possess magical properties, and associate a mystical diagram (yantra) with each verse.

== Modern translations ==
An English translation was published by Vijay K. Jain in 2023.
