= Manatunga =

7th century Indian Jain ascetic

Acharya Manatunga
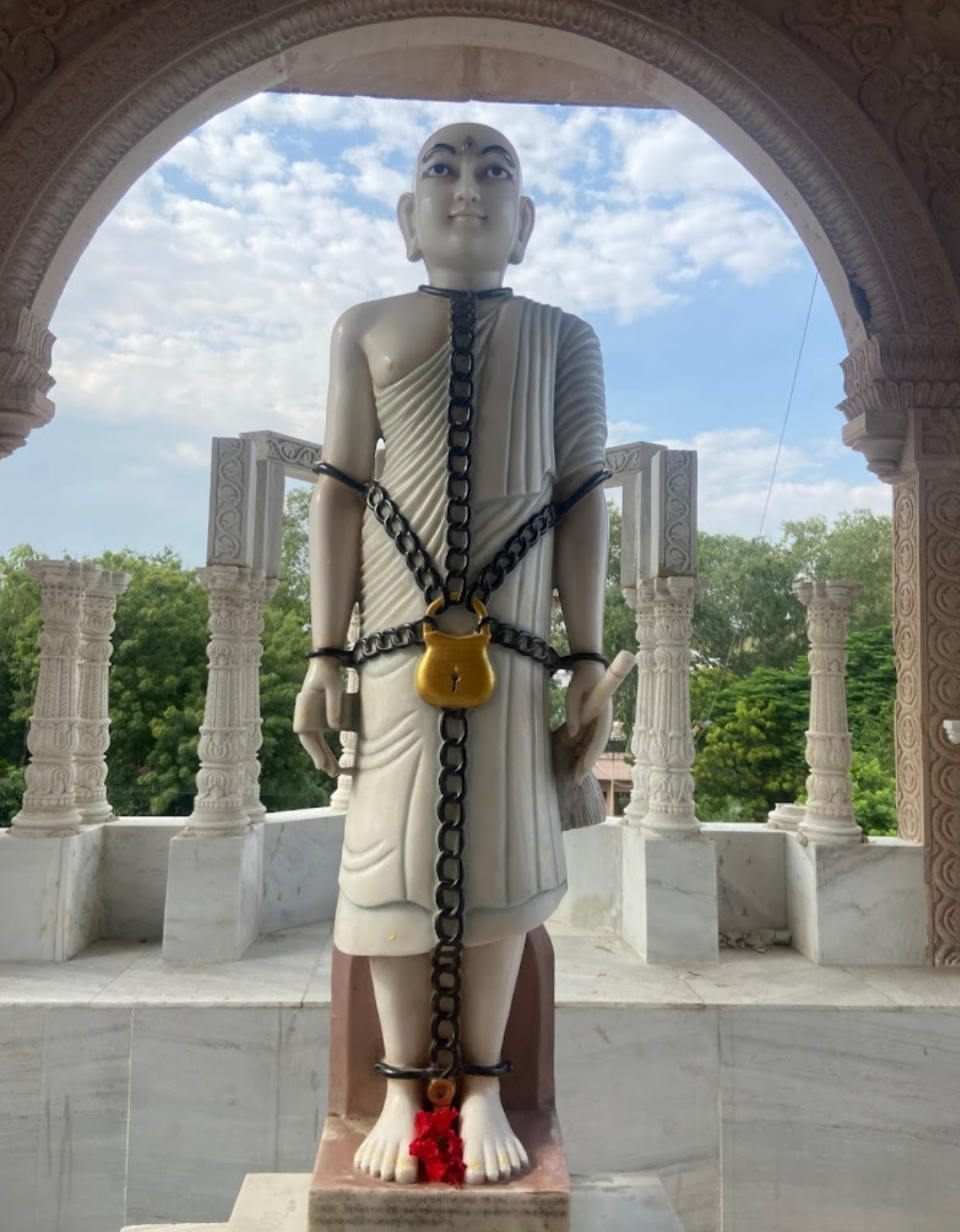
- Modern statue of Manatunga tied up with chains and locks

Personal life
- Born: 7th century CE

Religious life
- Religion: Jainism

Acharya Manatunga (c. seventh century CE) was the author of the Jain prayer Bhaktamara Stotra. His name only appears in the last stanza of the said prayer. He is also credited with composing another Śvetāmbara hymn titled Namiun Stotra or Bhayahara Stotra, an adoration of Parshvanatha.

According to a Digambar legend, Manatunga composed the Bhaktamara Stotra when he was locked up in prison for failing to appear before the royal court of King Bhoja. A Śvetāmbara legend as stated in the 14th century text Prabandha-Chintamani says that he was locked up to test the mantric powers of Śvetāmbara Jain monks. As he composed each stanza of the Bhaktamara Stotra, the 44 (Śvetāmbara tradition) or 48 (Digambara tradition) locks of his chain were broken one by one.

The Śvetāmbara literature contains extensively described biographies of Acharya Manatungsuri. The oldest mention of the legend of the composition of the Bhaktāmara Stotra is in Acharya Prabhachandrasuri's Prabhavakacarita written in 1277 CE.

== Historicity ==
There is no contemporary historical, archaeological, or epigraphic record detailing the physical life of Manatunga. Modern historians of Sanskrit literature, such as A. K. Warder, utilize linguistic analysis of his classical poetry (kāvya), firmly date him to the early 7th century CE during the post-Gupta period. Consequently, scholars recognize that all specific biographical details regarding his birth, lineage, and monastic initiation are not contemporary facts, but rather retrospective hagiographies derived entirely from medieval Jain chronicles (Prabandhas) composed centuries after his death.

== Śvetāmbara accounts ==
The earliest and most extensive biographical narratives concerning Manatunga are preserved within the Śvetāmbara literary tradition. The oldest detailed account is found in the Prabhavakacarita, written by Prabhācandra in 1277 CE (roughly 600 years after Manatunga's life). According to this text, Manatunga was born in Varanasi. His father is identified as Dhandeva, a member of the Brahmakshatriya caste. The chronicle states he was initiated into the Jain monastic order by Jinasimhasuri of the Vanavāsi Gaccha (a monastic lineage of the Śvetāmbara Murtipujaka sect).

Subsequent Śvetāmbara literature heavily expanded upon his life. The 1305 CE Prabandha-Chintamani, authored by Merutunga, places his foundational miracle—the composition of the Bhaktāmara Stotra to break his physical chains—in Varanasi. Further sectarian details and corroborations of the Prabhavakacarita lineage are also found in the Bhaktamar Stotra Vritti, composed by Gunakarsuri in 1370 CE.

== See also ==
- Devardhigani Kshamashraman
- Hemachandra
- Hiravijaya

== Sources ==
- Cort, John E. (2001a), Jains in the World : Religious Values and Ideology in India, Oxford University Press, ISBN 978-0-19-513234-2
- Dalal, Roshen (2010) [2006], The Religions of India: A Concise Guide to Nine Major Faiths, Penguin books, ISBN 978-0-14-341517-6
- Dundas, Paul (2002) [1992], The Jains (Second ed.), London and New York: Routledge, ISBN 0-415-26605-X
- Granoff, Phyllis (1990), The Clever Adulteress and Other Stories: A Treasury of Jaina Literature, Motilal Banarsidass, ISBN 978-81-208-1150-8
- Shah, Umakant Premanand (1987), Jaina-rūpa-maṇḍana: Jaina iconography, Abhinav Publications, ISBN 81-7017-208-X
- Warder, A. K. (1983), Indian Kāvya Literature, vol. 4: The Ways of Originality (Bāṇa to Dāmodaragupta), Motilal Banarsidass, ISBN 978-81-208-0449-4
