= Hemachandra =

Jain polymath (1088–1173)

Acharya Hemachandra Suri
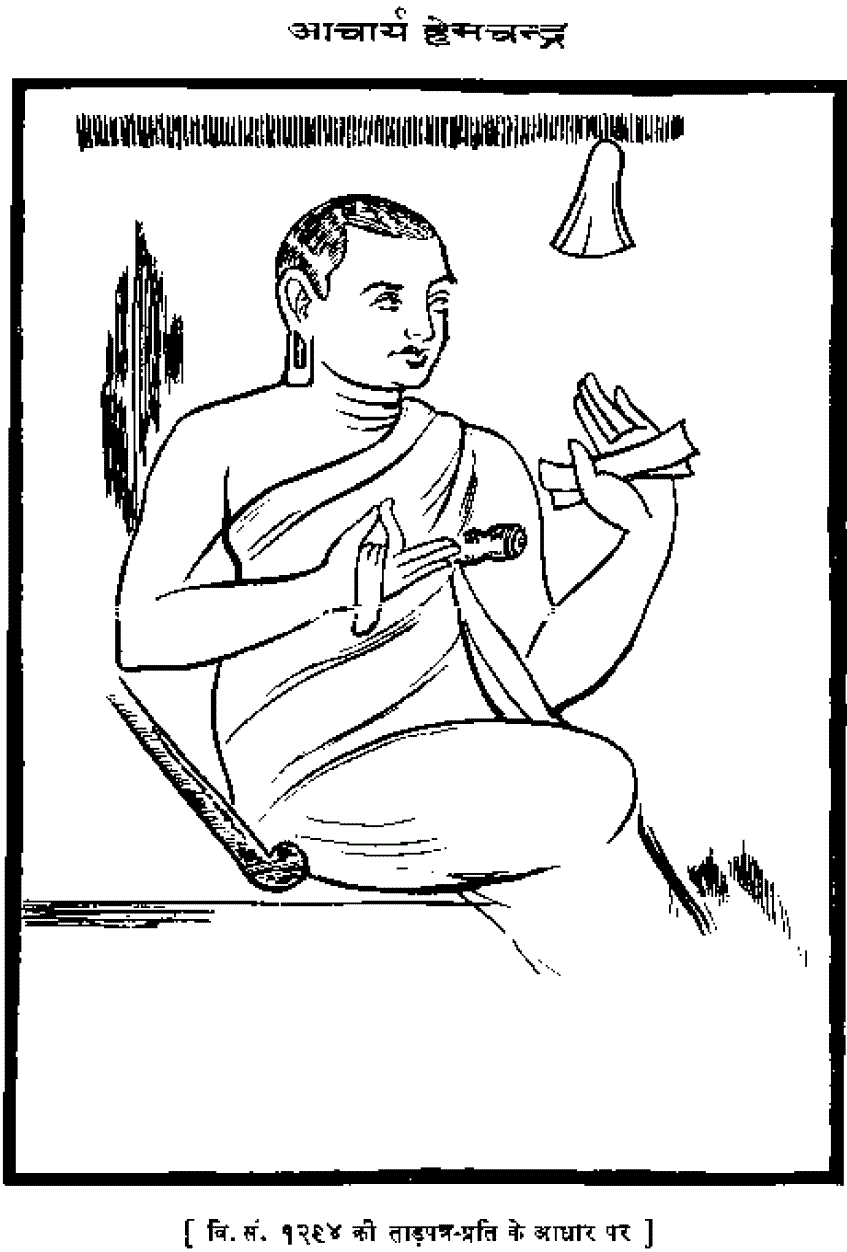
- Drawing of Hemchandra based on Vikram Samvat 1294 palm leaf
- Official name: Acharya Hemchandra Suri

Personal life
- Born: Changadeva c. 1088 (see notes) Dhandhuka
- Died: c. 1173 (see notes) Anhilwad Patan
- Parent(s): Chachinga, Pahini
- Notable work(s): Siddha-Hema-Śabdanuśāśana, Yogaśāstra, Parishishtaparvan, Sthaviravalicharitra

Religious life
- Religion: Jainism
- Sect: Śvētāmbara
- Initiation: Somchandra; Khambhat by Devchandrasuri

Religious career
- Post: Acharya (Jainism)

Hemachandra (c. 1088 – c. 1172/1173) was an 11-12th century Śvetāmbara Jaina ācārya, scholar, poet, mathematician, philosopher, yogi, grammarian, law theorist, historian, lexicographer, rhetorician, logician, and prosodist. Noted as a prodigy by his contemporaries, he gained the title kalikālasarvajña, "the knower of all knowledge in his times" and is also regarded as father of the Gujarati language.

Born as Caṅgadeva, he was ordained in the Śvetāmbara school of Jainism in 1110 and took the name Somacandra. In 1125 he became an adviser to King Kumārapāla and wrote Arhannīti, a work on politics from Jaina perspective. He also produced Triśaṣṭi-śalākā-puruṣacarita ("Deeds of the 63 Illustrious Men"), a Sanskrit epic poem on the history of important figures of Jainism. Later when he was consecrated as ācārya, his name was changed to Hemacandra.

== Early life ==
Hemacandra was born in Dhandhuka, in present-day Gujarat, on Kartika Sud Purnima (the full moon day of Kārtika month). His year of birth differs according to sources but 1088 is generally accepted. (Note: The dates of birth and death differs according to sources. He was initiated aged 21.) His father, Cāciga was a Moḍha Bania. His mother, Pāhini, was a Jaina. Hemacandra's birth name was Caṅgadeva. In his childhood, the Jaina monk Devacandra Sūri visited Dhandhuka and was impressed by the young Hemacandra's intellect. His mother and maternal uncle concurred with Devachandra, in opposition to his father, that Hemacandra be a disciple of his. Devachandra took Hemacandra to Khambhat, where Hemacandra was placed under the care of the local governor Udayana. Cāciga came to Udayana's place to take his son back, but was so overwhelmed by the kind treatment he received, that he decided to willingly leave his son with Devachandra.

Some years later, Hemacandra was initiated a Jaina monk on Magha Śukla Chaturthī (4th day of the bright half of Magha month) and was given a new name, Somacandra. Udayana helped Devacandra Suri in the ceremony. He was trained in religious discourse, philosophy, logic and grammar and became well versed in Jaina and non–Jaina scriptures. At the age of 21, he was ordained an acārya of the Śvētāmbara school of Jainism at Nagaur in present-day Rajasthan. At this time, he was named Hemacandra Suri.

== Hemacandra and Siddharaja ==
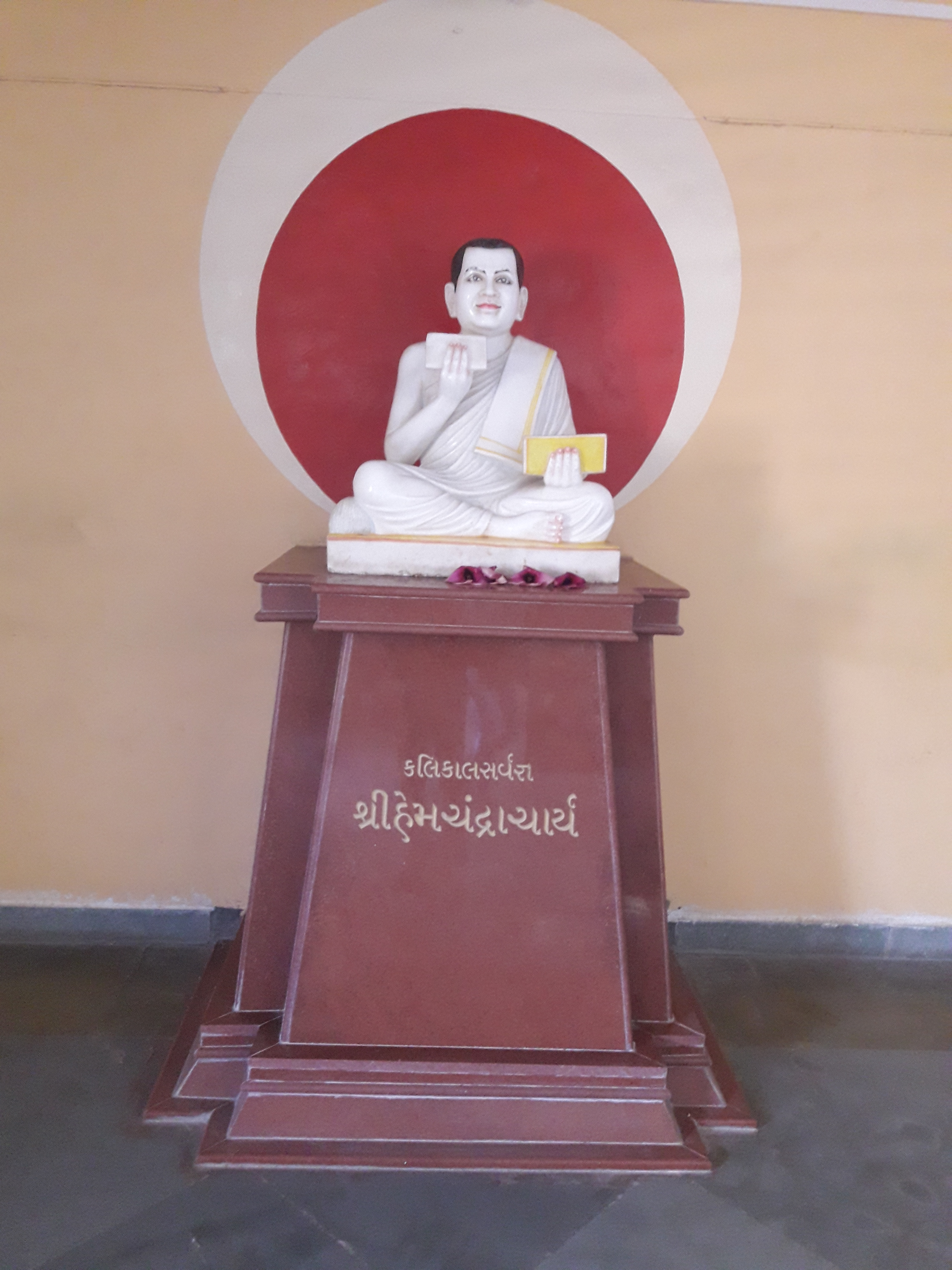
Bust of Hemacandra at Hemchandracharya North Gujarat University

At the time, Gujarat was ruled by the Chaulukya dynasty from Aṇahilavāda (Patan). It is not certain when Hemacandra visited Patan for the first time. As Jain monks are mendicants for eight months and stay at one place during Chaturmas, the four monsoon months, he started living at Patan during these periods and produced the majority of his works there.

Probably around 1125, he was introduced to Jayasiṃha Siddharāja (fl. 1092–1141) and soon rose to prominence in the Caulukya royal court. According to the Prabhavakacarita of Prabhācandra, the earliest biography of Hemacandra, Jayasiṃha spotted Hemacandra while passing through the streets of his capital. The king was impressed with an impromptu verse uttered by the young monk.

In 1135, when Siddharāja conquered Malwa, he brought the manuscripts of Bhoja from Dharā aalong with other things. One day Siddhraja came across the manuscript of SarasvatiīKanṇṭaābharanṃ (also known as the Lakshana Prakash), a treatise on Sanskrit grammar. He was so impressed by it that he told the scholars in his court to produce a grammar that was as easy and lucid. Hemachandra requested Siddharaja to find the eight best grammatical treatises from Kashmir. He studied them and produced a new grammar work in the style of Pāṇini's Aṣṭādhyāyī. He named his work Siddha-Hema-Śabdanuśāśana after himself and the king. Siddharaja was so pleased with the work that he ordered it to be placed on the back of an elephant and paraded through the streets of AnṇaiīwdvāḍaPatan. Hemacandra also composed the Dvyasśaya Kāvya, an epic on the history of the Chaulukya dynasty, to illustrate his grammar.

== Hemacandra and Kumārapāla ==
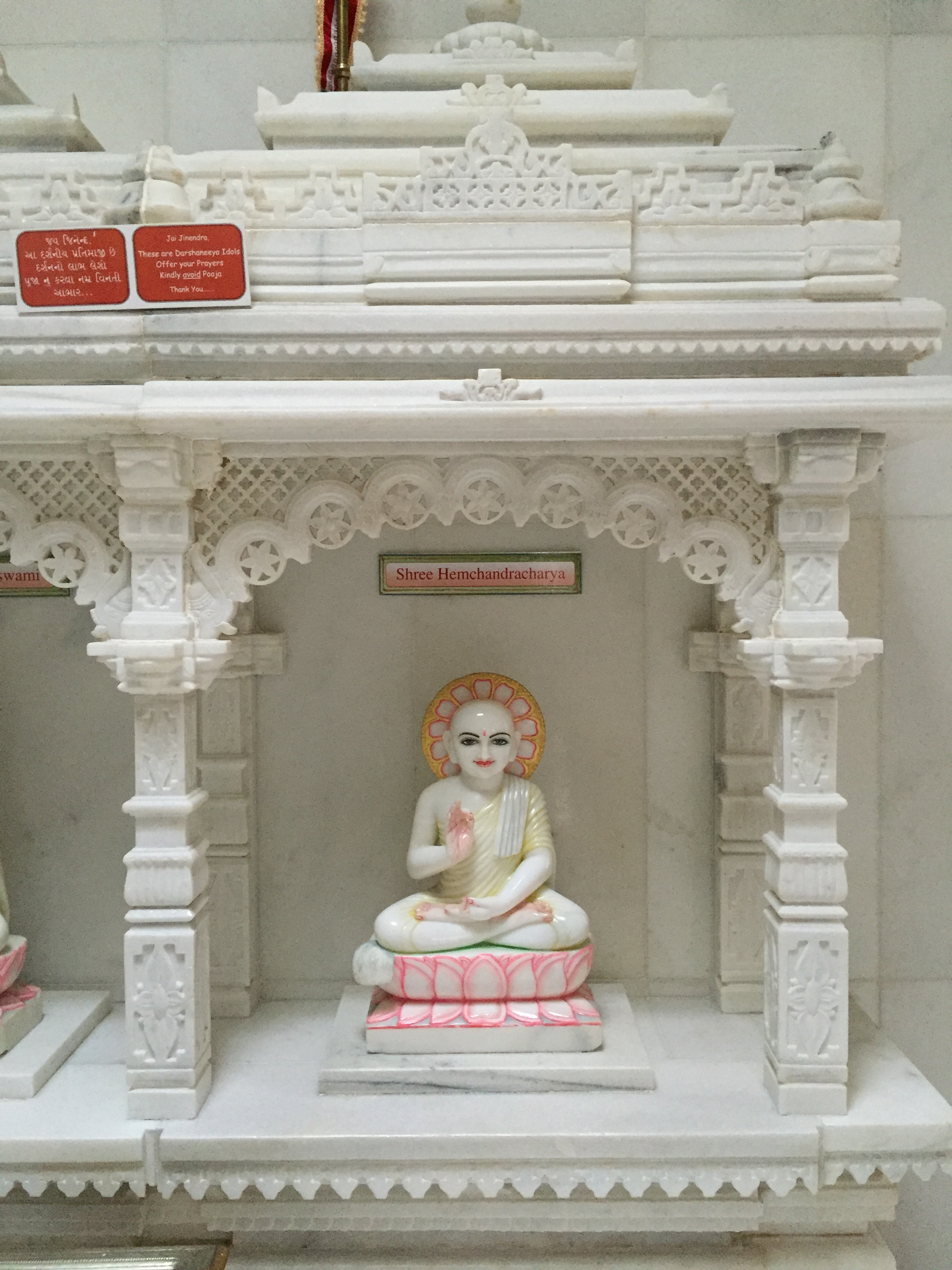
Idol of Hemacandra at Jain Center of New Jersey, US

According to the Prabhācandra, there was an incident where Siddharāja wanted to kill his nephew Kumarāpala because it was prophesied that the kingdom would meet its demise at Kumarapāla's hands. Hemacandra hid Kumarapāla under a pile of manuscripts to save him. However, such motifs are common in Indian folk literature, so it is unlikely it was an actual historical event. Also, many sources differ on Siddharāja's motives.

Hemacandra became the advisor to Kumārapāla. During Kumarapala's reign, Gujarat became a center of culture. Using the Jaina approach of Anekantavada, Hemacandra is said to have displayed a broad-minded attitude, which pleased Kumārapāla. Kumārapāla was a Shaiva and ordered the rebuilding of Somnath at Prabhas Patan. Some Hindu saints who were jealous of Hemacandra's rising popularity with the Kumārapāla complained that Hemacandra was a very arrogant person, that he did not respect the vedic deities and that he refused to bow down to Hindu God Shiva. When called upon to visit the temple on the inauguration with Kumārapāla, Hemacandra readily bowed before the lingam but said:

"भवबीजाङ्कुरजनना रागाद्याः क्षयमुपगता यस्य। ब्रह्मा वा विष्णुर्वा हरो जिनो वा नमस्तस्मै॥

I bow down to him who has destroyed the passions like attachment and malice which are the cause of the cycle of birth and death; whether he is Brahma, Vishnu, Shiva or Jina.

Ultimately, the king became a devoted follower of Hemacandra and a champion of Jainism.

Starting in 1121, Hemacandra was involved in the construction of the Jain temple at Taranga. His influence on Kumārapāla resulted in Jainism becoming the official religion of Gujarat and animal slaughter was banned in the state. The tradition of animal sacrifice in the name of religion was completely uprooted in Gujarat. As a result, even almost 900 years after Hemacandra, Gujarat still continues to be a predominantly lacto-vegetarian state, despite having an extensive coastline.

== Death ==
He announced about his death six months in advance and fasted in his last days, a Jaina practice called sallekhana. He died at Aṇahilavāḍa Patan. The year of death differs according to sources but 1173 is generally accepted.

== Works ==
A prodigious writer, Hemacandra wrote grammars of Sanskrit and Prakrit, poetry, prosody, lexicons, texts on science and logic and many branches of Indian philosophy.

=== Jain philosophy ===
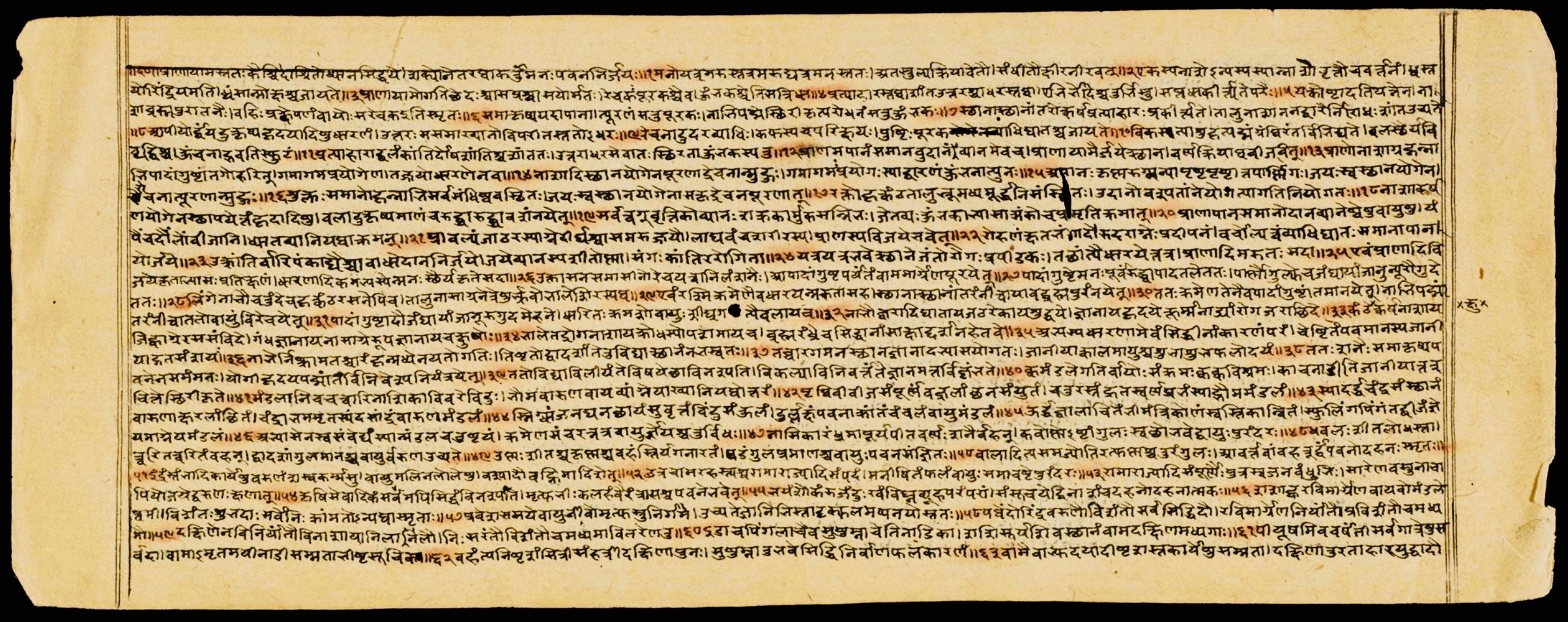
A 12th-century manuscript of Hemacandra's Yogasastra in Sanskrit. The text is notable for using 1 mm miniaturized Devanagari script.

His systematic exposition of the Jain path in the Yogaśāstra and its auto-commentary is a very influential text in Jain thought. According to Olle Quarnström it is "the most comprehensive treatise on Śvetāmbara Jainism known to us".

=== Grammar ===
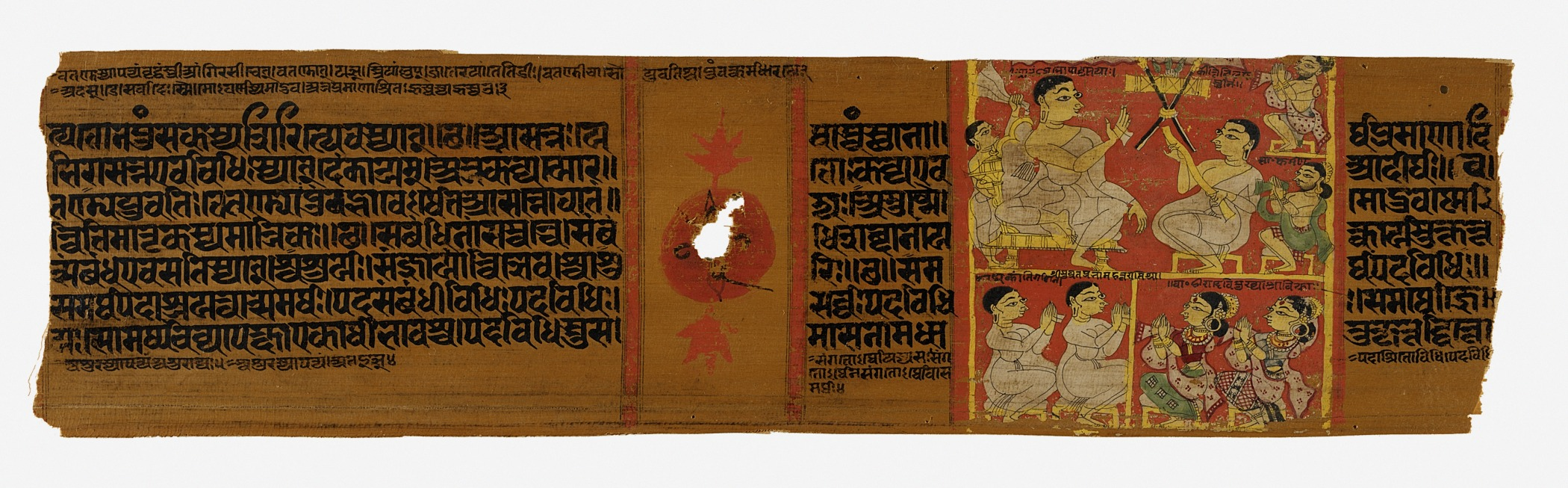
Hemacandra's grammar text Siddhahemashabdanushasana in Sanskrit

The Siddha-Hema-Śabdanuśāśana includes six languages: Sanskrit, the "standard" Prakrit (virtually Mahārāṣṭrī Prākrit), Śaurasenī, Māgadhī, Paiśācī, the otherwise-unattested Cūlikāpaiśācī and Apabhraṃśa (virtually Gurjar Apabhraṃśa, prevalent in the area of Gujarat and Rajasthan at that time and the precursor of Gujarati language). He gave a detailed grammar of Apabhraṃśa and also illustrated it with the folk literature of the time for better understanding. It is the only known Apabhraṃśa grammar. He wrote the grammar in form of rules, with 8 Adhyayas (Chapters) and its auto-commentraries namely – "Tattvaprakāśikā Bṛhadvṛtti" with "Śabdamahārṇava Nyāsa" in one year. Jayasimha Siddharaja had installed the grammar work in Patan's (historically Aṇahilavāḍa) state library. Many copies were made of it, and many schemes were announced for the study of the grammar. Scholars like Kākala Kāyastha were invited to teach it. Moreover, an annual public examination was organized on the day of Jñāna-pañcamī. Kielhorn regards this as best grammar of Indian middle ages.

=== Politics ===
In 1125, he became an adviser to Kumārapāla and wrote the Arhannīti, a work on politics from a Jain perspective.

=== Poetry and poetics ===
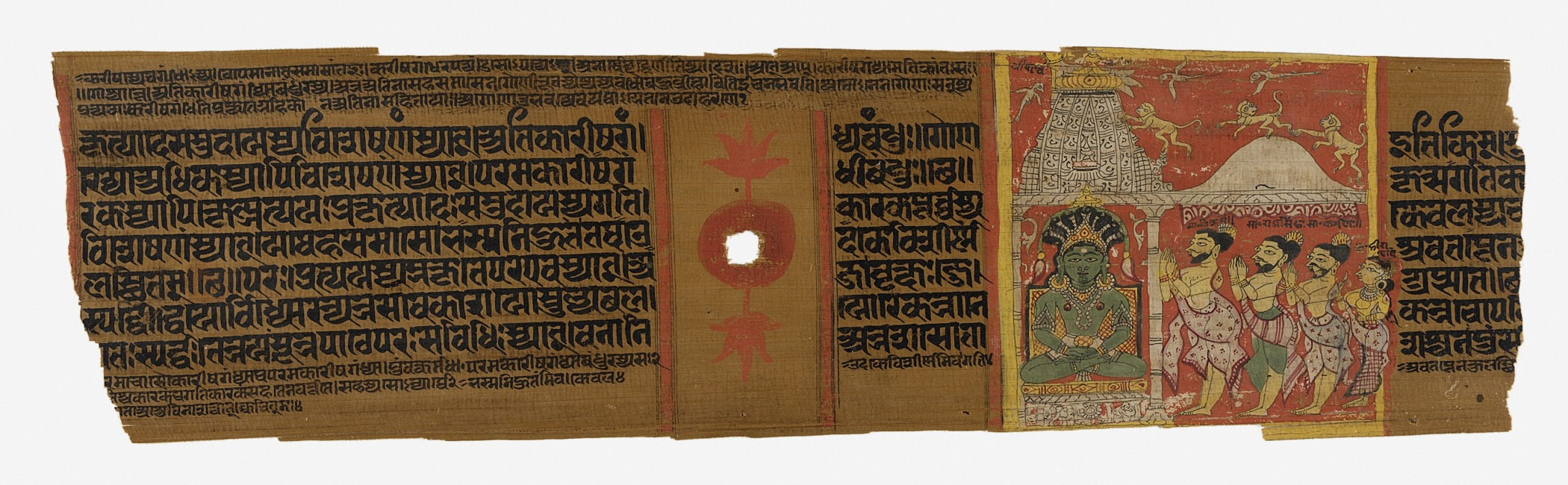
Worship of Parshvanatha, Folio from the Siddhahemashabdanushasana

To illustrate the grammar, he produced the epic poetry Dvyāśraya Kāvya on the history of Chaulukya dynasty. It is an important source of history of region of the time. The epic poem Triṣaṣṭi-śalākā-puruṣa-caritam or "Lives of Sixty-Three Great Men" is a hagiographical treatment of the twenty four Tīrthaṅkaras and other important persons instrumental in defining the Jain philosophical position, collectively called the "śalākāpuruṣa", their asceticism and eventual liberation from the cycle of death and rebirth, as well as the legendary spread of the Jaina influence. It still serves as the standard synthesis of source material for the early history of Jainism. The appendix to this work, the Pariśiṣṭaparvan or Sthavirāvalīcarita, contains accounts of the ācārya tradition starting from Jambūsvāmī. It has been translated into English as The Lives of the Jain Elders. In the test, Hemachandra accepts the polyandry of Draupadi and further suggests that Draupadī was Nāgaśrī in one of her previous lives and had poisoned a Jaina monk. Therefore, she had to suffer in hell and animal incarnations for several lives before being born as woman who later became a Jaina nun. After her death, she was reborn as Draupadī and was married to five Pāṇḍavas.

His Kāvyānuśāsana follows the model of Kashmiri rhetorician Mammaṭa's Kāvya-Prakāśa. He has authored a commentary called Alaṅkāracūḍāmaṇi and annotation called Viveka. He has quoted other scholars like Ānandavardhana and Abhinavagupta in his works.

=== Lexicography ===
Abhidhānacintāmaṇi is a Saṃskṛta lexicon while Anekārthakoṣa is a lexicon of words bearing multiple meanings. Deśīnāmamālā is the lexicon of local or non-Sanskrit origin. Nighaṇṭu Śeṣa is a botanical lexicon.

=== Prosody ===
He composed the Chandonuśāsana, a work on prosody, with commentary.

=== Mathematics ===
Thirteen ways of arranging long and short syllables in a cadence of length six, here shown with Cuisenaire rods of length 1cm and 2cm

Hemacandra, following the earlier Gopala, described the Fibonacci sequence in around 1150, about fifty years before Fibonacci (1202). He was considering the number of cadences of length n, and showed that these could be formed by adding a short syllable to a cadence of length n − 1, or a long syllable to one of n − 2. This recursion relation F(n) = F(n − 1) + F(n − 2) is what defines the Fibonacci sequence.

He (c. 1150 CE) studied the rhythms of Sanskrit poetry. Syllables in Sanskrit are either long or short. Long syllables have twice the length of short syllables. The question he asked is How many rhythm patterns with a given total length can be formed from short and long syllables? For example, how many patterns have the length of five short syllables (i.e. five "beats")? There are eight: SSSSS, SSSL, SSLS, SLSS, LSSS, SLL, LSL, LLS. As rhythm patterns, these are xxxxx, xxxx., xxx.x, xx.xx, x.xxx, xx.x., x.xx., x.x.x

=== Other works ===
His other works include a commentary in rhetoric work called Pramana-Mīmāṃsā (a work on logic and epistemology), Vitaraga-Stotra (praise of Jina).

== See also ==
- Devardhigani Kshamashraman
- Manatunga
- Hiravijaya

== Notes ==
- As per Dundas, (1089–??)
- As per Datta and Jain World, (1088–1173)
- As per Gujarat Gazetteers, Volume 18, (1087–1174)
- As per Indian Merchants and Entrepreneurs, (1089–1173)
