= M. S. Fernando =

Sri Lankan musician (1936–1994)

- එම්. එස්. ප්‍රනාන්දු
- Born: Magage Samson Fernando; 4 March 1931; Moratuwa, British Ceylon
- Died: 9 April 1994 (aged 58); Colombo, Sri Lanka
- Education: St. Anthony's College, Wattala; Christ Church College, Dehiwela
- Occupations: Singer; composer; playback singer
- Spouse: Tulin Fernando
- Children: 7
- Parents: Laron Fernando (father); Lilee Gomes (mother)
- Relatives: Walter Fernando (brother)
- Musical career
- Genres: Pop; Baila; rhythm and blues; Country music
- Instrument: Vocals
- Years active: 1956–1994
- Labels: Singlanka; Tharanga

Mahagamage Samson Fernando, (Sinhala: එම්. එස්. ප්‍රනාන්දු; 4 March 1936 - 9 April 1994) was a Sri Lankan singer and musician. He is a major player in the development of Baila music and was widely popular among Sri Lankan audiences commonly referred to as the "Baila Chakkrawarthi" (Baila emperor).

== Personal life ==
Fernando was born on 4 March 1936 in Moratuwa to Laron Fernando and Lilee Gomes as the eldest child of the family. He attended St. Anthony's College, Wattala and Christ Church College, Dehiwela. He had three younger sisters and one younger brother.

Fernando was married to Tulin Fernando and they had seven children: Susil, Telina, Shantha, Sarath, Sujitha, Sujeewa and Sunimal. He also has 17 grandchildren.

== Career ==
Fernando studied under veteran musician J. A. Sathyadasa. He debuted as a singer with the duet, "Malak Kada Konde Gasala," done with Pushparani Ariyaratne. It was written by Karunaratne Abeysekera. The song became popular and allowed Fernando to become a playback singer. His first song in the field, "Sili Siliye Nava Suvandak," for the 1964 film Sasaraka Hati, sang with was also a success. Fernando would eventually lend his voice to over 150 films. He also pursued an acting career appearing in over 25 films and several teledramas, most notably Udagira. He made duets with Angeline Gunathilake in several films such as: Geetha, Hathara Denama Surayo, Edath Adath Suraya, Sujeewa, Ava Soya Adare and Sergeant Nallathambi.

While singing M.S Fernando also was working at the Central Bank of Sri Lanka at a middle class position.

Fernando received many accolades in his long career including the Golden Lotus Award presented by Sri Lankan President William Gopallawa in 1973 and over 159 silver trophies in various Baila contests he entered. He was able to sing in five languages and incorporated dancing into his act. Fernando performed in England, France, Australia, Canada, Singapore and Middle East to Sri Lankan audiences.

After 23 days of treatment at the hospital, he later made playback in the film Maruwa Samaga Vase directed by Titus Thotawatte and film Sasara by K.A.W. Perera. Meanwhile, he has acted in more than 25 films especially with supportive roles. In 1972, he sang the song "Punchi Panchi Kale" for the film Hithaka Pipunu Mal, which shows another level of his singing ability. In 1974, he sang the popular song "Rosa Kekula Rosa" along with H. R. Jothipala for the film Lasanda. In 1975, Fernando made the song "Dili Dili Dilisena Eliyak" for the film Sikuru Liya under the music by Clarence Wijewardena. For the film Nedeyo in 1976, he made vocals with Latha Walpola for the song "A Rankanda Pemkanda", composed by George Leslie.

The Sinhala Baila song Pissu Vikare (Dagena Polkatu Male) by H. R. Jothipala, Milton Perera, M. S. Fernando is a cover version of the Tamil song Dingiri Dingale (Meenachi) from the 1958 Tamil film Anbu Engey. And it was covered again in Sinhala as a folk song named Digisi/Digiri Digare (Kussiye Badu).

In solo singing, the majority of the songs sung by Fernando showcased his experience drawn from rural or urban life or the news of life, including the popular song Mama Taxikaraya. In the morning of his date of death, he attended a musical concert in the Jawatte, Colombo.

== Filmography ==
Year	Film	Roles	Ref.
1964	Sasaraka Hati	Playback Singer	
1965	Yata Giya Dawasa		
1965	Hathara Maha Nidhanaya	Pavement Opportunist	
1967	Iwasana Danaa	Playback Singer	
1967	Rena Giraw	Playback Singer	
1969	Oba Nathinam		
1969	Mee Masso	Playback Singer	
1970	Dan Mathakada	Playback Singer, Lyricist, Singer	
1970	Athma Pooja	Playback Singer	
1970	Geetha	Playback Singer	
1970	Thevetha	Playback Singer	
1970	Penawa Neda	Playback Singer	
1971	Poojithayo	Playback Singer	
1971	Hathara Denama Surayo	Playback Singer, Lyricist, Robert	
1971	Samanala Kumariyo	Playback Singer	
1972	Adare Hithenawa Dakkama	Playback Singer, M. S.	
1972	Edath Suraya Adath Suraya	Playback Singer	
1972	Sujeewa	Playback Singer	
1972	Singapore Charlie	Playback Singer	
1972	Hithaka Pipunu Mal	Playback Singer	
1973	Sadahatama Oba Mage	Playback Singer	
1973	Hathdinnath Tharu	Playback Singer, Himself	
1973	Hondama Welawa	Playback Singer	
1973	Sinawai Inawai	Playback Singer	
1974	Kasthuri Suwanda	Playback Singer	
1974	Surekha	Playback Singer	
1974	Susee	Playback Singer, Beach singer	
1974	Sagarika	Playback Singer	
1974	Lasanda	Playback Singer	
1974	Vasthuwa	Playback Singer	
1975	Raththaran Amma	Playback Singer	
1975	Awa soya Adare	Playback Singer	
1975	Kohoma Kiyannada	Playback Singer	
1975	Amaraneeya Adare	Playback Singer	
1975	Lassana Kella	Playback Singer	
1975	Gijulihiniyo	Playback Singer	
1975	Damayanthi	Playback Singer	
1975	Sikuruliya	Playback Singer	
1975	Hadawathaka Wasanthaya	Playback Singer	
1975	Sangeetha	Playback Singer	
1976	Nayanaa	Playback Singer	
1976	Harima Badu Thunak	Playback Singer	
1976	Saradielge Putha	Playback Singer	
1976	Nedeyo	Playback Singer	
1976	Ran Thilaka	Playback Singer, Singer	
1977	Chin Chin Nona	Playback Singer	
1977	Chandi Putha	Playback Singer	
1977	Maruwa Samaga Wase	Playback Singer	
1977	Yakadaya	Playback Singer	
1978	Saraa	Playback Singer	
1978	Kundala Keshi	Playback Singer, Migara	
1978	Sasara	Playback Singer	
1979	Sarungale	Playback Singer	
1979	Muwan Palessa	Playback Singer	
1979	Hari Pudumai	Playback Singer	
1980	Tak Tik Tuk	Playback Singer	
1980	Seetha	Playback Singer	
1980	Doctor Susanthaa	Playback Singer	
1980	Sasaraka Pathum	Playback Singer	
1980	Raja Dawasak	Playback Singer	
1982	Sakvithi Suwaya	Playback Singer	
1983	Sasara Wasana Thuru	Playback Singer	
1983	Loku Thaththa	Playback Singer	
1988	Chandingeth Chandiya	Playback Singer	
1990	Pem Rajadahana	Playback Singer	
1990	Honda Honda Sellam	Playback Singer	
1992	Ranabime Veeraya	Playback Singer	
1993	Sergeant Nallathambi	Playback Singer	
2007	Hai Master	Playback Singer	
