= Calypso-style baila =

Sri Lankan music genre

Calypso-style baila is a genre of Sri Lankan music and a subgenre of baila music. It grew out of Sri Lankan musicians' fascination with the music of the Caribbean in the 1960s, particularly Harry Belafonte and calypso music. It typically uses acoustic guitars, rhumba shakers and conga/bongo drums.

Sri Lankan groups such as Los Cabelleros led by Neville Fernando (first ever Sinhala pop group), Las Bambas, The Humming Birds, Los Muchachos, and The Moonstones (whose members included Annesley Malewana and Clarence Wijewardane) practiced this music, which melded Caribbean rhythms to traditional Sri Lankan baila music. Noel Ranasinghe's Le Ceylonians became the most famous group of this genre.

== See also ==
- Bayila
