= Dhanapala =

Dhanapala is both a given name and a surname. Notable people with the name include:

- Dhanapala Attygalle, Ceylonese lawyer
- Dhanapala Udawaththa, Sri Lankan singer
- Dhanapala Weerasekera (1924–2011), Ceylonese politician
- D. B. Dhanapala (1905–1971), Sri Lankan journalist
- Jayantha Dhanapala (1938–2023), Sri Lankan diplomat
- Thiran Dhanapala (born 1996), Sri Lankan cricketer
