= Hiravijaya =

Indian Jain ascetic (1526–1595)

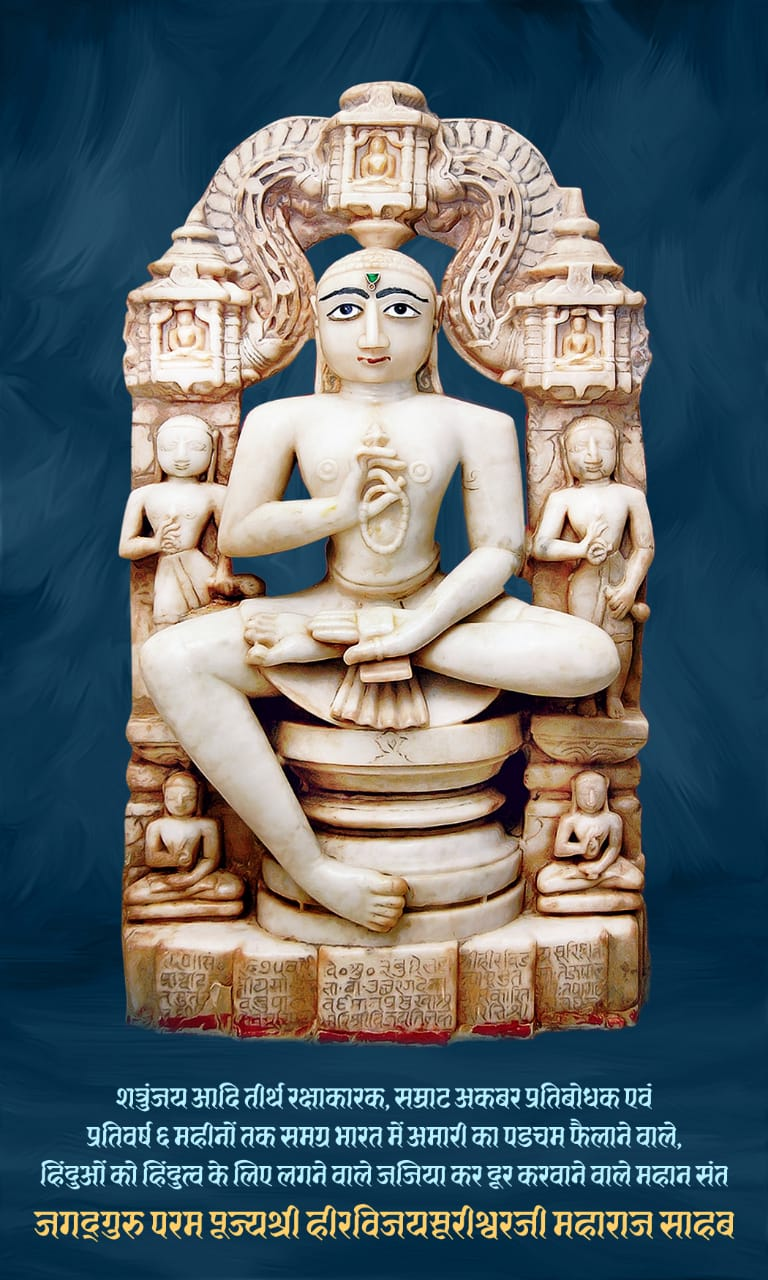

Personal life
- Born: 1526
- Died: 1595 (aged 68–69)

Religious life
- Religion: Jainism
- Sect: Śvetāmbara

Hiravijaya (1526–1595), also known as Muni Hiravijayji and Hiravijay Suri, was a high priest of the Tapa Gaccha monastic order, following the Jain Śvetāmbara tradition. He is known for propounding the Jain philosophy to Mughal Emperor Akbar and turning him towards vegetarianism.

== Early life and monkhood ==
Hiravijaya was born in a Jain Oswal family in Palanpur in Gujarat in 1527. His parents had died when he was still an infant, and he was brought up by his two elder sisters. He became the disciple of a Jain monk, Vijayadana Suri, a monk in lineage of Acharya Jagatchandrasuri in 1540 at the age of 13, and a new name Hira Harsh was given to him. He was taken to Devagiri – a center of Sanskrit learning in those days, for further education. He successively won the title of Pandit in 1550, Upadhyaya in 1552 and Suri in 1553. This last title he won at Sirohi and became an Acharya. Hence-forth he was known as Acharya Hiravijayasuri. In 1556 when his guru died, the Śvetāmbara Tapa Gaccha community of Gujarat selected him as their Acharya (head of congregation). At that time there was a large community of around 2,000 students studying under him.

== Influence on Akbar ==
In 1582, Emperor Akbar invited Hiravijaya to explain him the principles of Jainism. He first discussed the various aspects of religion and philosophy with Abul Fazal and the later with Akbar. The emperor was so impressed with Hiravijaya that he bestowed on him the title of Jagatguru which means World Teacher or the Preceptor of the World. Akbar was so much influenced by the religion of non-violence preached by the Jain monk that he became vegetarian most of the days, prohibited slaughter of animals and birds, released prisoners and gave up fishing and hunting which were his favourite pastime. Hiravijaya is reported to have told Akbar: "How could a man’s stomach be a tomb of animals?" creating an aversion for meat eating in mind of Akbar. Out of respect for Jainism, Akbar declared firmans (royal decree) for Amari Ghosana banning the killing of animals during the Jain festivals of Paryusana and Mahavir Janma Kalyanaka (birthdate of Mahavira). He rolled back the Jazia tax from Jain pilgrim places like Palitana. Furthermore, he issued firmans for ban on slaughter of animals for six months in Gujarat, abolishing the confiscation of property of deceased persons and removal of the Sujija Tax (Jazia) and a Sulka (possibly a tax on pilgrims).

Indologist and biographer of Akbar, Vincent Smith notes: "Akbars action in abstaining almost wholly from meat and in issuing stringent prohibitions, resembling those of Asoka, restricting to the narrowest limit the destruction of animal life, certainly was taken in obedience to the doctrine of his Jaina teachers." Akbar developed such fondness for the Jain ideology that he repeatedly requested Hiravijaya to send his itinerary one after another. At the request of the Emperor he left behind his brilliant disciple Shantichandra with the Emperor, who in turn left his disciples Bhanuchandra and Siddhichandra in the royal court. Akbar again invited Hiravijaya’s successor Vijayasena in his court who visited him between 1593 and 1595.

== In literature ==
In Ain-i-Akbari, Abul Fazal gives a list of 140 influential learned persons during Akbar's time. Out of this, he places 21 persons in the highest class as “persons who understands the mysteries of the both worlds”. He thus places Hiravijaya Suri in this list of twenty-one most learned persons in the Mughal Empire. His ardent disciples Devavimal Gani composed Hira Saubhagya Kavya and another disciple Padmasagara composed Jagatguru Kavya in his honour. Both works of poetry written in Sanskrit were composed in 1590.

== See also ==
- Devardhigani Kshamashraman
- Manatunga
- Hemchandra

== Bibliography ==
- Bakshi, S. R. (2005), Early Aryans to Swaraj, Sarup & Sons, ISBN 81-7625-537-8
- Jaini, Padmanabh (1998), The Jaina Path of Purification, New Delhi: Motilal Banarsidass, ISBN 81-208-1578-5
- Mehta, Shirin (September–October 1992), "Akbar as Reflected in the Contemporary Jain Literature in Gujarat", Social Scientist, 20 (9/10), New Delhi: 54–60, doi:10.2307/3517717, ISSN 0970-0293, JSTOR 3517717
- Roy, Ashim Kumar (1984), A history of the Jainas, New Delhi: Gitanjali Pub. House, OCLC 11604851
- Sharma, S. R. (1999), Mughal Empire In India : (A Systematic Study Including Source Material), Vol. 1, Revised Ed, Atlantic Publishers & Distributors, ISBN 81-7156-817-3
