= Moratuwa =

Moratuwa මොරටුව
- City
- Nickname: MRT
- Location within Colombo District Location within Sri Lanka
- Coordinates: 6°47′56.66″N 79°52′36.04″E
- Country: Sri Lanka
- Province: Western Province
- District: Colombo District

Government
  - Type: Municipal Council
  - Mayor: K. D. Nishantha Ferdinando

Area
  - Land: 23.4 km^{2} (9.0 sq mi)
- Elevation: 28 m (92 ft)

Population (2012)
  - Total: 168,280
- Time zone: UTC+5:30 (SLT)
- Postal Code: 10400
- Website: moratuwa.mc.gov.lk/si/?page_id=1355&lang=en

Moratuwa (Sinhala: මොරටුව) is a large municipality on the southwestern coast of Sri Lanka, near Dehiwala-Mount Lavinia. It is situated on the Galle–Colombo (Galle road) main highway, 18 km (11 mi) south of the centre of Colombo. Moratuwa is surrounded on three sides by water, except in the north of the city, by the Indian Ocean on the west, the Lake Bolgoda on the east and the Moratu river on the south. According to the 2012 census, the suburb had a population of 168,280.

Moratuwa is the birthplace of Veera Puran Appu, a resistance fighter against British rule in Matale, the philanthropist Sir Charles Henry de Soysa and the musician Pandit W. D. Amaradeva.

== Suburb structure ==
Moratuwa consists of 24 main areas: Angulana, Borupana, Dahampura, Egoda Uyana, Idama, Indibedda, Kadalana, Kaduwamulla, Kaldemulla, Katubedda, Katukurunda, Koralawella, Lakshapathiya, Lunawa, Molpe, Moratumulla, Moratuwella, Puwakaramba, Rawathawatta, Soysapura, Thelawala, Uswatta, Uyana and Willorawatta.

== History ==
Both Moratuwa and Lakshapathiya are mentioned in the 15th century poem Kokila Sandesha, written by a monk poet of Devundara to celebrate Prince Sapumal during the reign of King Parakramabahu VI. Lunawa, Uyana and Rawathawatte are mentioned in 16th century chronicles and church records of martyrs, the latter commemorates Revatha Thera, the chief incumbent of a temple built by King Vijayabahu I. Lakshapathiya, meaning commanding a hundred-thousand, was once the land awarded to Lak Vijaya Singu, a Commander of King Nissanka Malla. Subsequent to the Wijayaba Kollaya and the division of the Kotte Kingdom, the hamlet of Koralawella was created as part of Raigam Korale, which again became part of Moratuwa in 1735, however losing Ratmalana and parts of Borupane to Dehiwala. The name Moratuwa is derived from "Mura Atuwa" meaning sentry turret in Sinhalese which once existed at Kaldamulla.

About twelve miles (19 km (12 mi)) from Colombo, the chief town of Ceylon, on the high road to Galle, which is the second town, there is a belt or bar of land, lying between the sea on the one side, and, an extensive lake, or rather lagoon, on the other. And as the sea in this quarter abounds in fish, and this lagoon has many arms leading from its ample basin into canals stretching along the coast, and into rivers, flowing from the mountains, so as to form a great harbour, the surrounding country, which is very fertile, has become very populous. On the bank of land referred to, stands the thriving village of Morotto, remarkable for its fishermen and its carpenters.

— Dr. John Gibson MacVicar, Chaplain of St. Andrews' Church, Colombo (1830 - 1853)

== Industries ==
Industries in Moratuwa include the manufacture of furniture, rubber products, batteries, transformers, and wood handicrafts. This suburb is also a fishing and trading center. Of these, Moratuwa is most well known for its furniture.

== Attractions ==
The Bolgoda lake situated in Moratuwa is the largest natural lake of Sri Lanka. It is a tributary of the Kalu Ganga which originates at Adam's Peak and is a popular resort for swimming, angling and boating. Bolgoda lake spreads, twisting from Ratmalana via Moratuwa and Panadura till it meets the sea at Wadduwa and Moratuwa via the Moratu ganga. Moratuwa is home to the oldest church dedicated to St. Sebastian and the Holy Emmanuel Church, which was once the tallest building in Sri Lanka. A monument to Puran Appu stands in the premises of the Moratuwa Municipal Council and a museum is housed at the Weera Puran Appu Vidyalaya.

== Music ==
Moratuwa is famous for its music and is home to some well-known musicians such as W. D. Amaradeva, C.T. Fernando, M. S. Fernando, Paul Fernando, Nihal Nelson, Priya Peiris (La Bambas), Sunil Perera (The Gypsies),Maxwell Mendis, and Niranjala Sarojini.

The town also has a famous theme song, Punsada paaya Moratuwa dillenna (meaning "Moratuwa in the splendour of the full moon"), which is a staple at most musical events held in Moratuwa. Clarence Wijewardena also composed Moratuwa Moratuwa mea nomakena nama song in tribute to the town.

== Sport ==
Moratuwa is famous for its notable cricket players, such as Duleep Mendis, Susil Fernando, Roger Wijesuriya, Ajantha Mendis, Amal Silva, Romesh Kaluwitharana, Sajeewa de Silva, Dinusha Fernando, Lahiru Thirimanne, Prasanna Jayawardene, Angelo Perera, Kusal Mendis, Vishwa Fernando, Amila Aponso, Avishka Fernando, Sadeera Samarawickrama, Nishan Madushka, Dunith Wellalage,Vishwa Fernando,Oshada Fernando,Nuwanidu Fernando and Praveen Jayawickrama

An international cricket stadium, De Soysa Stadium (Tyronne Fernando Stadium) is situated in Moratuwa.

== Demographics ==
Moratuwa is a Buddhist majority area. Moratuwa consisting of all ethnic and religious groups seen in Sri Lanka. This suburb has a highest percentage of Christian population after Negombo, which is significantly higher than the national average.

Ethnicity	Population	% Of Total
Sinhalese	158,738	94.33
Sri Lankan Tamils	4,988	2.96
Indian Tamils	405	0.24
Sri Lankan Moors	2,698	1.60
Other (including Burgher, Malay)	1,451	0.86
Total	168,280	100

Religion	Population	% of Total
Buddhist	114,784	68.21
Catholics	33,319	19.80
Other Christians	13,059	7.76
Islam	3,339	1.98
Hindu	3,549	2.11
Others	230	0.14
Total	168,280	100

== Public library ==
The Public library of Moratuwa Municipal Council “Janasetha Kala Ketha” at Galle Road, Katubedda, Moratuwa, Sri Lanka was opened in 1987. This was constructed by the funds raised by Moratuwa municipal council to the amount of rupees 15 laks and 50 laks by the Japanese organization “World Exposition Commemorative”. The library was constructed according to Japanese architecture. Among the other facilities provided by the main library are art and stories hour and Tamil language hour for children, Computer classes for children and adults, conference, lectures etc. Every year the library celebrates the literature month (September) and National reading month (October), conducting various activities to develop reading habits among the children. Janasetha Kala Ketha, the public library of Moratuwa, has been awarded as The Best Public Library in Colombo district in the years 2012 and 2013 and as The Best Public Library in the Western Province of the Island in 2012.

== Transport ==
The main road transport link to Moratuwa is the Colombo-Galle Highway (Galle Road), which links the suburb from the North and South. Moratuwa is linked to the outside by four bridges, Old Moratuwa Bridge at the town centre, New Galle Road Bridge at Modara, Kospalana Bridge and Borupana Road Bridge, all across the Bolgoda Lake. The town is linked by Galle Road to the North at Ratmalana, to Panadura to the South and to Pilyandala in the East. Access to the Southern Expressway from Moratuwa is either through Kottawa or by Horana Road. There are two Sri Lanka Transport Board Depots in Moratuwa: Moratuwa S. L. T. B. Depot and Katubedda S. L. T. B. Depot.

The Coastal Railway Line from Colombo to Matara runs through Moratuwa along the coast. There are five railway stations in Moratuwa: Angulana, Lunawa, Moratuwa, Koralawella and Egodauyana.

== Architecture ==
Unlike most other cities in Sri Lanka, Moratuwa is characterised by many Christian schools and a large variety of church buildings, e.g. Anglican Holy Emmanuel Church which was built 1857–1860 in a neogothic style with a tall clock tower, the modern Methodist Church dating from 2016 in Moratuwella and St. Sebastian's Church, a neobaroque Roman Catholic church. Few buildings dating from colonial times are preserved, e.g. the Clock Tower and the Post Office.

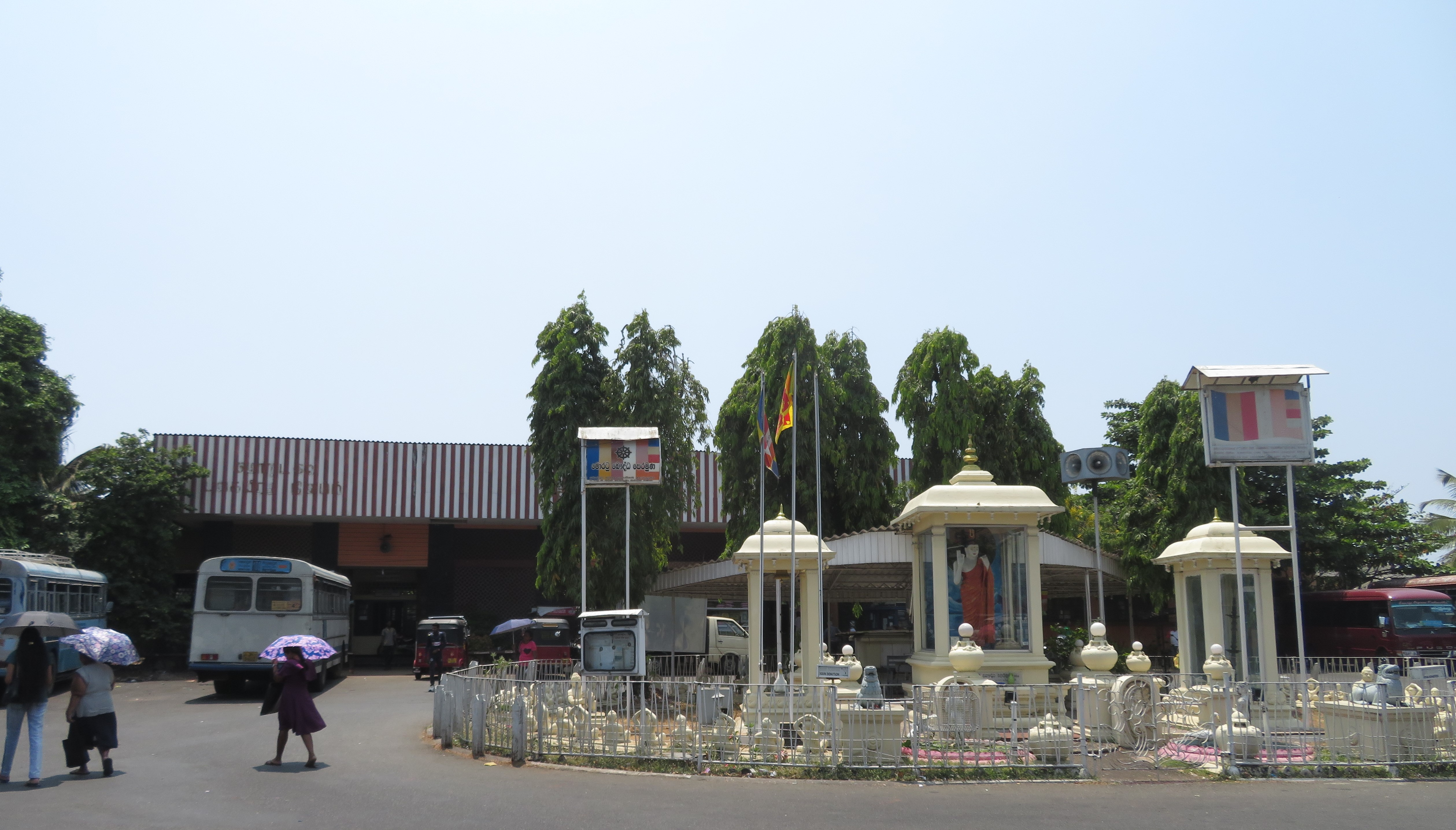
Moratuwa Railway Station

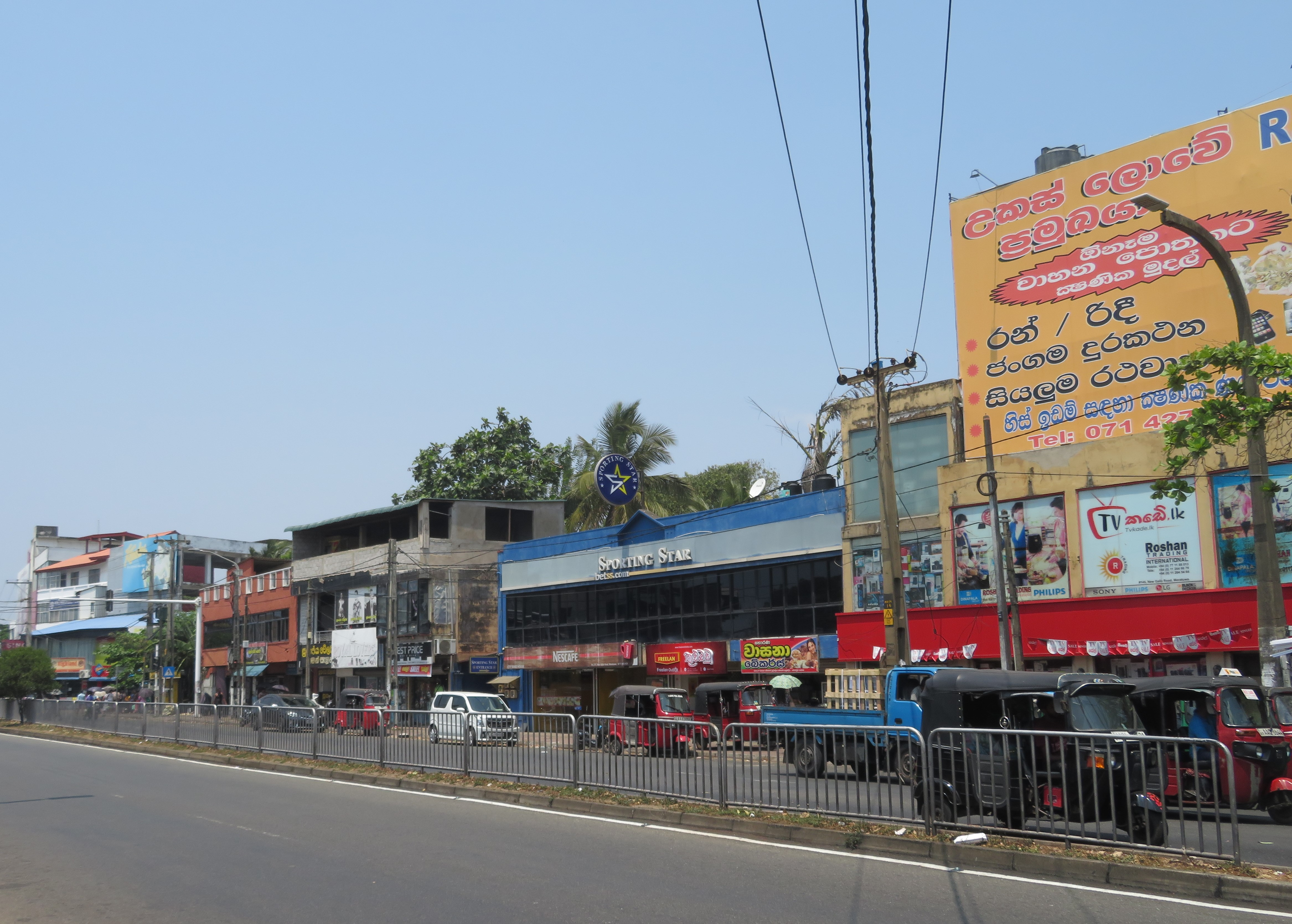
Galle Road

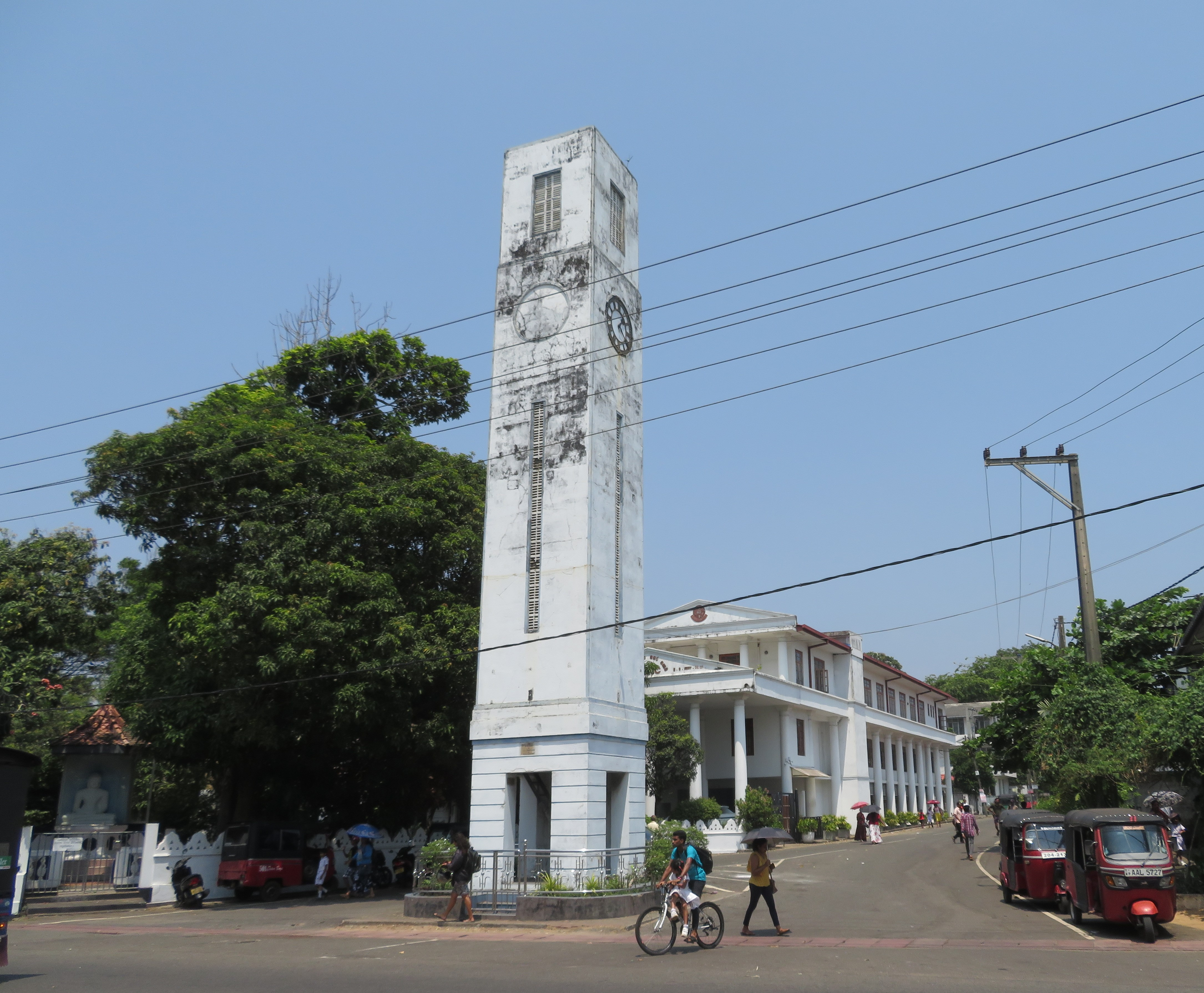
Clock tower and Urban Council

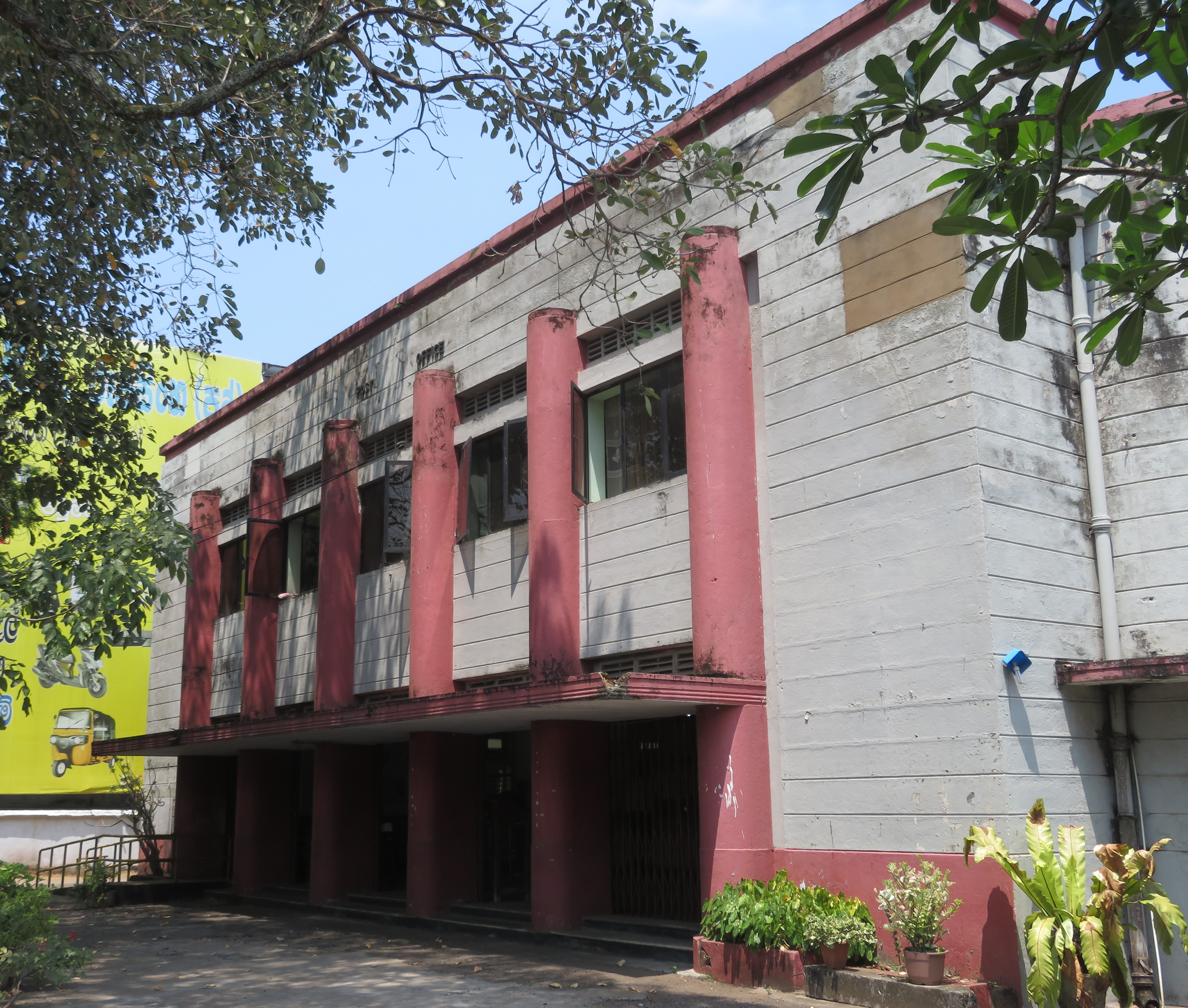
Post Office

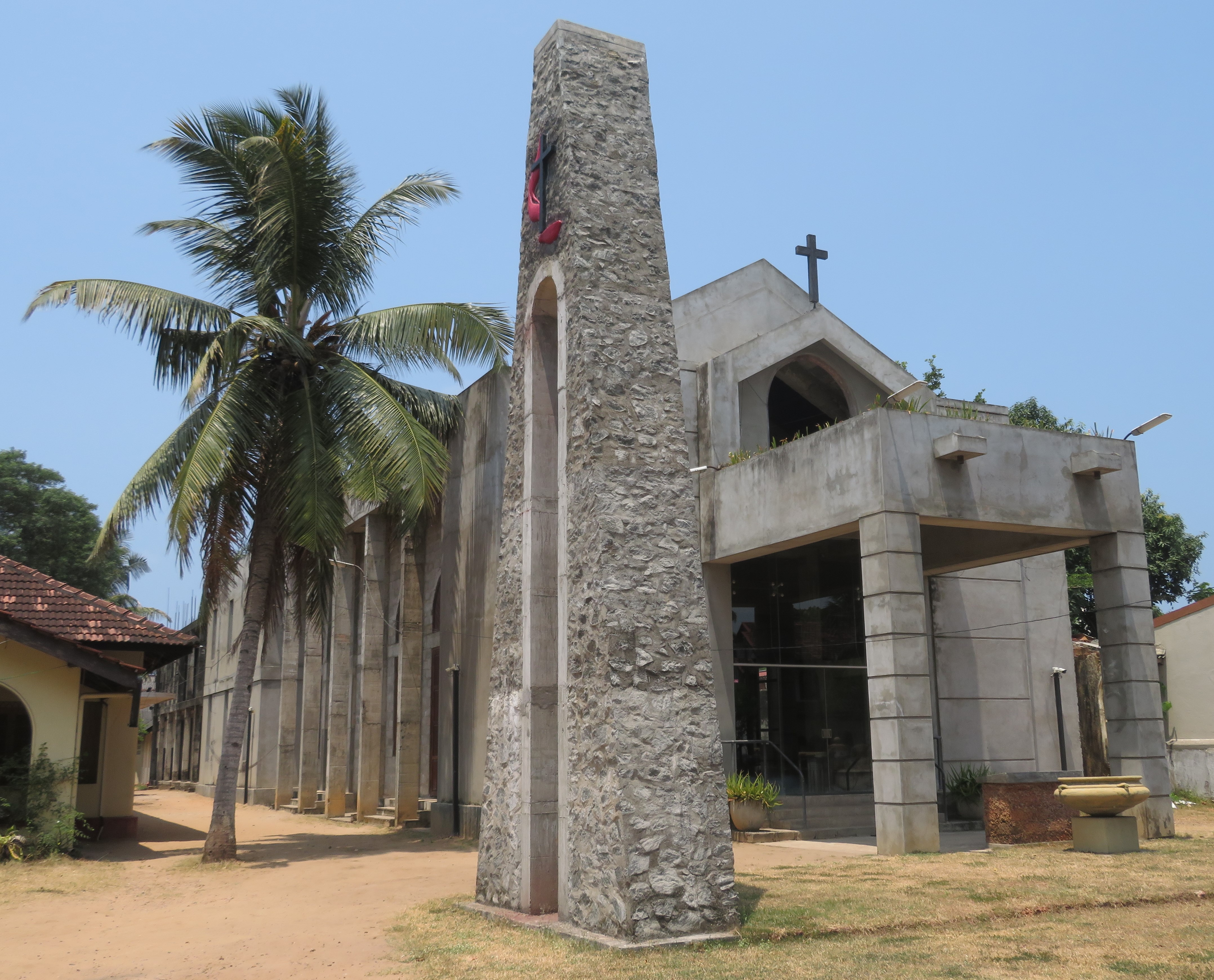
Methodist Church in Moratuwella

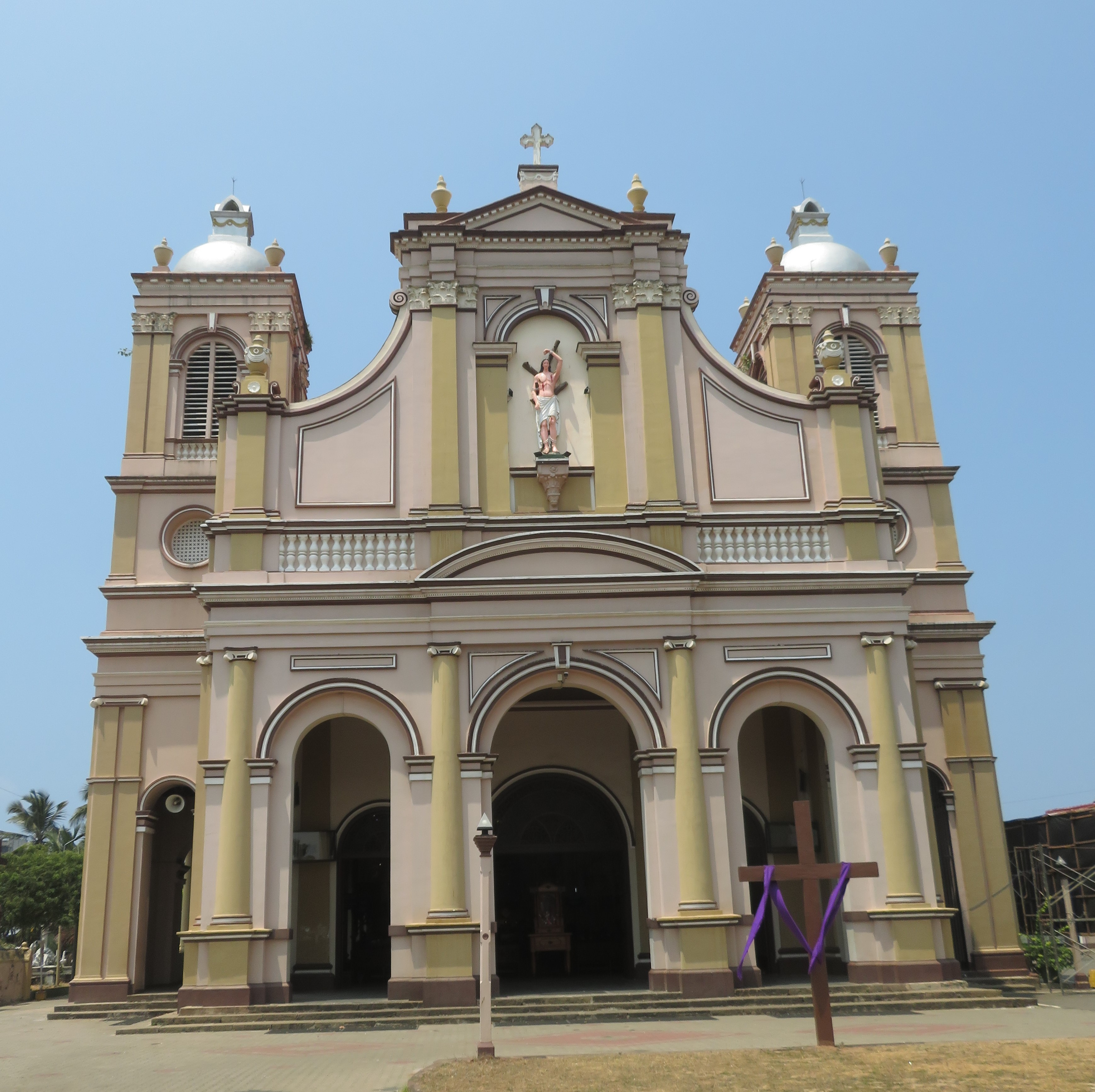
St. Sebastian's Church

== Maps ==
- Detailed map of Moratuwa vicinity and Sri Lanka
