= Sunflowers (band) =

Sri Lankan band

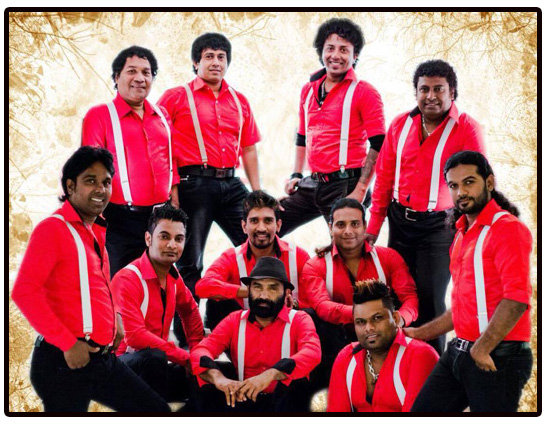

Background information
- Origin: Dankotuwa, Sri Lanka
- Genre: Pop
- Years active: 1983–present
- Label: Torana
- Members: Neil Warnakulasuriya; Nilantha Kurera; Ranil Wasantha; Sudath Nawalage; Dinesh Ananda; Chaminda Hettiarachchi; Ruwan fernando Jagath Sohantha; Sihina Malaka; Hashan Fernando
- Past members: Noel Raj; Athula Adhikari; Anton Perera; Kasun Chamikara; Nelson Vass; Shyamen Dangamuwa

Sunflower is a Sri Lankan pop band established in the early 1980s, led by Neil Warnakulasooriya. The band's name, "Sunflower" was reportedly given by veteran Sri Lankan musician, Clarence Wijewardena.

== Career ==
Sunflower performed their first show on 4 September 1983 in Dankotuwa. The original band consisted of Neil Warnakulasooriya, Nelson Vas, Ivor de Mel, Erny peiris, Christopher liyanage, Lushan alahakoon and Athula Adhikari.

== Members ==
=== Current ===
- Neil Warnakulasuriya - vocals
- Nilantha Kurera - guitar
- Ranil Wasantha - drums
- Sudath Nawalage – vocals, rhythm guitar
- Dinesh Ananda -bass
- Chaminda Hettiarachchi – octapad
- Ruwan fernando -keyboards
- Jagath Sohantha - vocals
- Sihina Malaka- vocals, keyboards
- Hashan Fernando -vocals

=== Former ===
- Shirantha Fernando - bass guitar
- Dilantha Dias – keyboards
- Chalana piyumantha – lead guitar
- Ivor de Mel - rhythm guitar, bass guitar, vocals
- Erny Peiris – bass guitar, vocals
- Gayan Fernando - bass guitar
- Mahinda Silva - drums, vocals
- Paul Fernando -saxophone
- Marlon Dileepa Fernando - bass guitar
- Manjula Gamage – lead guitar, vocals
- Christopher Liyanage - vocals
- Noel Raj – vocals
- Ruwan Bandara - vocals, rhythm guitar, darabouka
- Athula Adhikari – keyboards, vocals
- Anton Perera – keyboards
- Lucien Alahakoon - drums
- Kasun Chamikara - vocals
- Roshan Perera – drums
- Sujith Marasinghe - octapad, darabouka
- Indika Kalugama - vocals
- Roshan Thisera - keyboards
- Prabath Thamel - drums
- Shirantha Fernando - bass guitar
- Suranga-vocals
- Dangamuwa - Vocals
- Suresh-bass guitar
- Dinesh Dissanayake - keyboards
- Amila - drums
- Anuruddha perera-octapad
- lasantha- bass guitar
- sarath -Drums
- Nelson vass -Vocals
