= Dharmaratne Brothers =

Sri Lankan musical group

- Origin: College Street Kotahena, Sri Lanka
- Genres: Sri Lankan music
- Years active: 1967–present
- Labels: Phillips; Sooriya
- Members: Melroy Dharmaratne; Maxwell Dharmaratne; Christie Dharmaratne
- Past members: Ronald Dharmaratne

Dharmaratne Brothers was an influential Sri Lankan music group, composed of the brothers Christie, Maxwell, Melroy and Ronald Dharmaratne. They were the first all family Sinhala pop group, and racked up several hits in the late '60s and early '70s.

== Early years ==
The brothers first began singing together at family gatherings. By 1967, they had decided to pursue a musical career. They sang on stage for the first time at "Asiri Kusum," a fund raiser for St. Bridget's Convent. They shared the bill with other harmony vocal groups like La Ceylonians, Moonstones, La Lavinians, Los Flamingos, Humming Birds, La Bambas, Los Muchachos and Trio Los Serenaders. In July, the following year, the group recorded some songs written by Melroy on the Phillips Label (after being discovered by Patrick Corea), that included "Vessa Wahinawa," "Punchi Hurathala," and "Kandukare." These proved to be successes, each selling over 3,000 copies.

== Success ==
The Dharmaratne Brothers next recorded for the Sooriya label, and had hits with "Varsity Kello", "Suhada Pathum", "Sahodarayo Hathardena" and "Kellani me Ahapalla." Around this time, in the early '70s, their niece Shiromie Fernando also entered the music field, and had hits of her own.

With the popularity of the group, Melroy got the chance to write songs for other popular musicians of the time. He was particularly happy to work with his idol H. R. Jothipala. For Jothipala, Melroy composed "Oba Nidanna," "Mal Ethano," "Gangawai-Mahamuhudai," and "Malin Peeregiya" among others.

== Dissolution and comeback ==
Over the years the group slowly drifted apart; Christie accepted a job in the Middle East in 1978 causing the group to go on hiatus, and Ronald died in 1987 in a bus accident. In recent years, the three remaining group members have reconvened and regained some of their early popularity. In addition to music, Melroy has done directing work for films and stage dramas, written television and film script writing and has worked as a freelance journalist for several publications including Lake House. He has also authored several novels.
