= Papare (music) =

Papare is a form of music which originated in Sri Lanka. Adopted from Sri Lanka fast beats songs of band music, they normally play in festivals times. Papare is a very lively genre of music, and is a popular music culture throughout the South Asian region. There are a lot of papare bands in Sri Lanka that play mostly at cricket matches to boost the morale of supporters. Papare is played most popular songs in Sri Lanka such as “Kekiri pelena, kada suriduni obe,kandy lamissi, gedara hitiya Rosa kekula,yaman bando, enna nangi enna malli etc.
