= La Bambas =

- Origin: Moratuwa, Sri Lanka
- Genres: Sri Lankan music
- Years active: 1966–Present
- Members: Priya Peiris; Rolinson Ferdinando; Brian Fernando; Lasla Fernando/Erinton Perera
- Past members: Late Lasla Fernando / Brian Fernando

La Bambas was an influential Sri Lankan music group, composed of Priya Peiris, Rolinson Ferdinando, Brian Fernando, Erinton Perera and Lasla Fernando. They were one of the first Sinhala groups to utilize a box guitar, and were popular in Sri Lanka during the late '1960s; their hits include "Cock-a-doodle-do", "Nuwara Menikela", "Himidiriye (Piyakaru Mala)" and "Lak Nadhee".

== Formation ==
Brian Fernando was inspired to form the group after spotting an advertisement for a talent show in The Ceylon Observer. Fernando drawing inspiration from Sinhala musicians like Noel Ranasinghe and the La Ceylonians in his music, called on his friends Lasla, Rolinson, and Priya to complete the band. They applied for the contest and received a letter from the pop group Mignonne and the Jetliners inviting them to audition for the show in February 1966.

The auditions were successful, and the La Bambas appeared on stage for the first time on May 25, 1966, at the Coconut Grove inside Galle Face Hotel. It didn't go as well as they wished, however, as they were booed and jeered off the stage.

== Success and reunion ==
This was just a minor setback, and the La Bambas recovered to become one of the most popular Sinhala bands of the 1960s. After the band broke up, Priya Peiris pursued a solo career; in the early 2000s (decade), he represented the group at several nostalgia shows. Radio Ceylon, the oldest radio station in South Asia helped popularise their songs.
