= Chief architect (Sri Lanka) =

The Chief Architect was a position created in 1865 by Governor Hercules Robinson and the Executive Council of Ceylon to design and oversee the construction of public buildings across Ceylon.

Previously the Public Works Department, which was established in 1849 was managed by British engineers.

The chief architect worked within the Public Works Department and the first chief architect was James George Smither. The position was retained following the country's independence in 1948 however it was not until the appointment of Homi Billimoria in 1953, that a Ceylonese architect assumed the role. In 1969 the Public Works Department was abolished and replaced with the Department of Buildings. The department was established as the sole authority and consultancy institution in the construction of government buildings. In 1977 the position of Chief Architect was re-instated, with the appointment of Panini Tennekoon. He was the last recognised Chief Architect, following which the position reverted to Director - Architecture within the department, reporting to the Director General of Buildings.

List of Chief Architects
Name	Tenure	Birth date	Birthplace	Death date	Death place	Notable works
James George Smither OBE	1865-1883	January–March 1833	Ireland	1910	Camberwell, England	All Saints' Church, Galle (1868); Old Colombo Town Hall & Edinburgh Market (1870); Grand Oriental Hotel (1873); Colombo National Museum (1875); Colombo General Hospital; Custom House Jaffna Clock Tower (1880)
There are no records of a Chief Architect being appointed until 1925
Austin Woodeson OBE	1925 - 1932	3 May 1873	Reading, Berkshire, England	24 November 1935	Bournemouth, England	Ceylon University College (1921-27); Old Parliament Building, Colombo (1929); General Treasury Building (1930)
Tom Neville Wynne-Jones CBE, CMG	1932-1953	19 November 1893	Swansea, Glamorgan, Wales	21 June 1979	Frinton-on-Sea, Essex	Independence Memorial Hall (1949); Panagoda Cantonment (1953); Survey Department building, Colombo; Radio Ceylon studios (1950); Cathedral of Christ the Living Saviour (1967)
Homi Billimoria OBE	1953-1956	23 May 1901	Colombo, Ceylon	June 1956	Colombo	Mumtaz Mahal, Colombo (1928); Tintagel Colombo (1929); Independence Memorial Hall, Colombo (1948); Kandy Masonic Temple (1951); Young Men's Buddhist Association building, Colombo (1955); Navroz Baug (Fire Temple), Colombo
Justin Samarasekera	1956-1962	21 May 1916	Colombo, Ceylon	3 November 2003	Colombo, Sri Lanka	Independence Memorial Hall, Colombo (1948); Sri Lanka Association for the Advancement of Science, Colombo (1959); Institute of Practical Technology, Katubedde, Moratuwa (1959); Kalutara Chaitya, Kalutara (1965); Indian Pavilion and Ceylon Paper Corporation Pavilion, International Industrial Exhibition, Colombo (1965); Atchchuveli Industrial Estate, Jaffna (1970); SLFP Party Headquarters, Colombo (1970); University of Kelaniya Library, Kelaniya (1973); Kollupitiya Market, Colombo (1976); Yala Safari (1976); Wornel's Reef Hotel, Beruwala (1974); University of Ceylon Physics and Chemistry buildings (1979); Co-operative Wholesale Establishment, Colombo (1981); Sripada National College of Education, Kotagala (1982-89)
Velayuthampillai Kandavel (acting)	-1969					Ceylon Pavilion - World Expo, Montreal (1967); School of Architecture building, University of Ceylon (1968)
In 1969 the Public Works Department was abolished and replaced with the Department of Buildings.
Panini Tennekoon	1977-1979	5 February 1922		17 July 2007	Colombo, Sri Lanka	Colombo Library (1975); National Archives building (1975); Teaching Hospital complex at Colombo South General Hospital, Kalubowila; Bandaranaike Samadhi, Horagolla; Siyane Teachers Training College, Nittambuwa - assembly hall, female teacher trainees hostel and library; Kalubowila Hospital; Kollupitiya police station; Wadduwa police station; Peradenyia post office; Ministry of Buddha Sasana Complex, Colombo; Clock tower, New Town Anuradhapura; Zoological Gardens, Dehiwala - aquarium, entrance feature, reptilium, restaurant, and management office complex; Central Supermarket, Pettah (1979); Supreme Court Complex, Hulftsdorp (1978); Lady Ridgeway Hospital for Children, Borella; Sepala Wimaladharma Molligoda ~1981
Upali Iddawala	1997-1999	1940	Ambepussa, Sri Lanka			
Tamara Nandani Welikala Dayaratne						
Menaka Mangalanantha (acting)	2017 - 2019					
Ranathunga Arachchige Thushari Sajeewanee Ranathunga	2019–present					
