= Panini Tennekoon =

Sri Lankan architect (1922–2007)

- Born: 5 February 1922
- Died: 16 July 2007 (aged 85); Colombo, Sri Lanka
- Resting place: Borella Cemetery
- Occupation(s): public servant; architect
- Known for: Chief Architect of Sri Lanka
- Term: 1977 - 1979
- Predecessor: V. Kandavel
- Spouse: Nandani Bulankulama
- Children: Nalinda, Shiran

Panini Tennekoon (5 February 1922 – 16 July 2007) was a Sri Lankan architect. He spent most of his career as a public servant, working in the Public Works Department, serving as the country's chief architect, before running his own architectural practice, designing low-cost housing and investigating sustainable timber use in construction. He was a fellow of Sri Lankan Institute of Architects and the Royal Australian Institute of Architects.

== Early life and education ==
Tennekoon was educated at S. Thomas' College, Mount Lavinia.

He then joined an apprentice course in architecture run by Peradeniya University architect, Shirley de Alwis, in 1945. He was selected to join a five-year course at the Bartlett School of Architecture but decided not to travel to England and join the course due to the adverse living conditions in London at the end of the Second World War. In 1955, upon winning a Colombo Plan Scholarship to the School of Architecture at the University of Melbourne, he completed the five-year course in only three years, graduating in 1958 with a Graduate Diploma in Architectural Design. He was the first Asian to win the Wunderlich Annual Prize given by the school in recognition of general excellence by students.

== Career ==
In 1958, Tennekoon returned to Sri Lanka and was appointed assistant architect in the Public Works Department. In 1977, he was appointed as the chief architect. During his tenure at the Public Works department he was responsible for designing the National Library, Colombo (1976); Bandaranaike Samadhi, Horogolla; Prime Minister D. S. Senanayake's memorial, Colombo; Supreme Court Complex in Hulftsdorp (1978); Siyane Teacher Training College; teaching hospital complex at the Colombo South Hospital, Kalubowila; Kollupitiya police station; and the Department of National Archives.

In 1979 he became the chief architect of the Greater Colombo Development Authority (now known as the Urban Development Authority). Between 1991 and 1993, he was the consultant architect of the Architectural Unit of the Central Engineering Consultancy Bureau, where he was responsible for preparing the development scheme and master plan for the Lady Ridgeway Hospital for Children, and designing of the Central Engineering Consultancy Bureau premises. Tennekoon is credited with giving architecture a more central role in a culture of public commissions that were heavily centred in engineering, and using perspectival drawings to convey the importance of aesthetic aspects of buildings.

He died on 16 July 2007, at the age of 85, and was buried at Borella Cemetery.

== Notable honours ==
- 1955 - Colombo Plan Scholarship to the School of Architecture at the University of Melbourne
- 1956 - Wunderlich Annual Prize for General Excellence, University of Melbourne
- 1959 - Associate Royal Institute of British Architects
- 1970 - Fellow Royal Australian Institute of Architects
- 1976 - Fellow Sri Lankan Institute of Architects

== List of architectural works ==
=== Monuments ===
- Bandaranaike Samadhi, Horagolla
- D. S. Senanayake memorial, Independence Square, Colombo
- General Sir. John Kotelawala memorial, Colombo
- Manamperi memorial, side of road to Kataragama (1979): the memorial is a precast concrete structure adorned with a mural and which hosted a clay pot with drinking water for devotees of the nearby Kataragama Shrine.
- Aukana statue Layout, Bauddhaloka Mawatha, Colombo
- Clock tower, New Town Anuradhapura

=== National Parks Structures ===
- Kotmotte National Park bungalow, office complex and entrance feature, at Wilpattu National Park: The structure was built with tree trunks fallen in the park, which were used to construct A-frame structural elements. Tennekoon was interested in minimising damage done to the surrounding areas when building in natural reserves.
- Gonawiddgala Park bungalow and Timirigasmankada Park Bungalow, Udawalawe National Park
- Park bungalow, Giritale National Park
- Aquarium, entrance feature, reptilium, restaurant, management office complex, Zoological Gardens, Dehiwala

=== Housing ===
- Hostel Accommodation for Male Medical Students, Norris Canal Road
- Hostel for Female University Students Colombo Campus, Buller's Lane, Colombo
- Circuit Bungalow for Commissioner of National Housing, Kandy
- Public Works Department Circuit Bungalow, Arugambay
- Tourist Guest House Complex, R. A. de Mel Mawatha, Colombo
- Low-Cost Housing for Dwellers of Low Income High-Density Housing Areas, Colombo City Suburbs (1971)
- Low-Cost House, Kumbuke (1995)

=== Educational Buildings ===
- Academy of Administrative Studies, Longdon Place, Colombo
- Assembly hall, female teacher trainees hostel and library, Siyane Teachers Training College, Nittambuwa
- Sri Sanghabodhi Central College extension, Central Maha Vidyalaya
- Teaching Hospital complex at Colombo South General Hospital, Kalubowila
- Botany and Zoology Faculty Complex Colombo Campus, Thurstan Road, Colombo
- St. Bridget's Convent Assembly hall, Colombo

=== Commercial Buildings ===
- Laksala branches, Kegalla and Ratnapura
- Post Office complexes, Peradeniya and Veyangoda
- Police stations, Wadduwa, Beruwala and Kollupitiya
- Ministry of Buddha Sasana Complex, Colombo
- United Nations Development Program Complex extensions, Colombo
- Supreme Tourist Office complex, Colombo
- Central Finance Co. Office complex, Colombo
- Department of National Archives, Reid Avenue, Colombo: composed of three circular wings, with curved façades, linked by a three-storey exhibition hall. The building presents an innovative shading design consisting of precast vertical concrete elements in front of regular glass windows.
- Central Engineering Consultancy Bureau, Colombo
- Central Supermarket, Pettah (1979): the multi-story complex was designed to separate spaces where fish was sold from the rest of the market, utilising a central courtyard and two tapered funnels which direct air circulation, inspired by a steam-engine passenger ship.
- Supreme Court Complex, Hulftsdorp (1978): the buildings octagonal form was derived from the Paththirippuwa at the Temple of the Tooth, Kandy, and the roof was inspired by the traditional greeting, 'Ayubowan', with the joining of two palms.
- Secretariat complex, Kalutara
- Provincial Council Secretariat, Anuradhapura
- Courts Complex, Vavuniya
- Lady Ridgeway Hospital for Children, Borella
- National Library, Colombo (1976): British architect, Michael Brawne, appointed by UNESCO, worked closely with Tennekoon, in designing the five-storey reference and archival library.

== See also ==
- Geoffrey Bawa
- Minnette de Silva
- Valentine Gunasekara
- Justin Semarasekara
