= Sunil Santha =

- සුනිල් සාන්ත
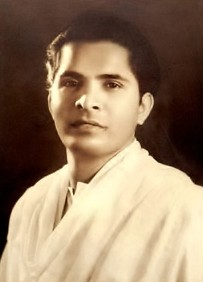
- Born: Baddaliyanage Don Joseph John; 14 April 1915; Ja-Ela, Sri Lanka
- Died: 11 April 1981 (aged 65); Colombo, Sri Lanka
- Education: St. Aloysius College; St. Benedict's College, Colombo
- Alma mater: Bhatkhande Music Institute
- Occupations: Composer; singer; songwriter
- Spouse: Bernadet Leelawathi Jayasekara
- Children: Sunil Santha Jr. Eng. Lanka Santha Jagath Santha Dr. Kala Santha
- Musical career
- Genres: Classical; soul; rhythm and blues; Sri Lankan music
- Instrument: Vocals
- Years active: 1945–1981
- Label: His Master's Voice
- Website: https://gurudevisunilsantha.lk/

Sunil Santha was a Sri Lankan composer, singer and lyricist. Known as the "Father of the Modern Sinhala Music" He was pivotal in the development of Sinhala music and folk songs in the mid to late 1940s and early 1950s. He composed the beloved soundtracks to Lester James Peries' films Rekava and Sandesaya in 1956 and 1960. In a later comeback, he produced several experimental works.

== Personal life ==
Sunil Santha was born on 14 April 1915 on the Sinhalese New Year's Day in Dehiyagatha, Ja-Ela, Sri Lanka. Both his parents died before he was two years old, and Santha was raised by his grandmother. At an early age he came to the limelight when he played King Dutugamunu in a village play. One villager adorned him with a battery-powered, lighted necklace. He had his education at Dehiyagatha Vidyalaya, St. Benedict's College, Colombo, Thudella school and St. Aloysius' College, Galle.

At St. Benedict's College, Santha passed the school leaving certificate examination as the first in the island, with the highest marks in his class as a young adult and was awarded the Weeraratne Award. In 1933, he completed the Teachers’ Final Examination and began his career as a teacher at Mt. Calvary School, now known as St. Aloysius' College, Galle. During his tenure, Santha guided the school to three consecutive victories at the Southern Schools Music Competition. In 1939 he passed the Intermediate Gandarva Examination and received a certificate in physical training. He also learned to play the piano and guitar at that time. He acted and produced several dramas including "Hamlet" during this period.

In 1952, he married school teacher Bernadet Leelawathi Jayasekara.

Santha died on 11 April 1981 from a heart attack shortly after his son Jagath drowned under mysterious circumstances in a swimming pool. His other son, Lanka Santha is an engineer who is married to Calista Rohini, an agricultural graduate.

== Music career ==
In 1940 Santha gave up teaching and travelled to Shantiniketan to study music. The following year Santha enrolled at the Bhatkhande Music Institute and worked to get his Visharadha Degree in 1944. He passed the final exam as the first in the first division in Sitar and Vocals, the first non-Indian Asian to do so. Joseph graduated in “Sangeetha Vishaarada” from the Bhathkanda University of Musicology and returned to Sri Lanka in 1952 and shunned his English name, Joseph John and adapted Sunil Santha. He then adopted the name "Sunil Santha". During his studies in India he regularly contributed to Sri Lankan newspapers.

On 2 March 1946 Santha held a recital for the Kumaratunga Commemoration ceremony and was asked to record for Radio Ceylon. Over the next six years, he would have a string of popular songs including "Olu Pipila", "Handapane", "Ho Ga Rella Negay", "Bowitiya Dan Palukan Vare", "Suwada Rosa Mal Nela", "Kokilayange", and "Mihikathanalawala." The song "Olu Pipila" is the first song to be recorded at then Radio Ceylon. Santha stressed his Sinhala heritage in his songs opting to sing in Sinhala rather than English and not copy Hindustani and Tamil songs of India. In the meantime, he joined Hela Havula literary association. A diligent songwriter himself, Santha sang songs written by lyricists like Huberth Dissanayake, Kumaratunga Munidasa, Raipiyel Tennakoon, Arisen Ahubudu and Fr. Marcelline Jayakody.

In 1952, Santha was banned from Radio Ceylon after refusing to audition for Indian classical musician S.N. Ratanjankar, whom the corporation had brought from India to oversee the direction of music on their stations. Santha experienced monetary problems after being terminated from Radio Ceylon. His songbooks were plagiarised, his songs were sold without consent or royalties by copyright violators. He tried his hand at various trades like photography, selling clothes and electronics over the next few years.

In 1953, Santha started a small school at the Maradana Newton building, vowing to teach 10 pupils for free. He often helped fellow artists and promising talent. He wrote to newspapers about the plight of Ananda Samarakoon and tried to bring attention to the composer of the national anthem. At a time when Albert Perera (later known as W.D. Amaradeva) who used to play violin at Sunil's performances, was in need of help, Sunil gave him two of his music classes at Panadura to teach and make a living. Sunil also helped collect money to send Amaradeva for further studies in India.

In 1955 journalist DB Dhanapala started a campaign to expose Santha's plight and raised some money through his column on Lankadeepa. In 1967 Director General Mr. Neville Jayaweera asked Santha to come back to the national radio service. Santha worked with W.D. Amaradeva and H. W. Rupasinghe to audition the artists.

Santha moved into his uncle's house in 1970 as he was evicted from the rental house he lived in. In 1977 a record titled Sunil Gee was produced. In 1980, a record titled Seegiril Gee was produced. This contained a set of songs written and composed by Sunil with melodies using only four notes. The lyrics were based on Sigiri Kurutu Gee (sigiri graffiti). The songs are remarkable in that they used traditional Sri Lankan drums and other instruments to create a unique sound.

== See also ==
Hela Havula
