= Anton Jones =

Sri Lankan singer and composer

- ඇන්න ජෝන්ස්
- Born: 3 June 1937; Hulftsdorp, Sri Lanka
- Died: 22 February 2016 (aged 78); Kalubowila, Sri Lanka
- Education: St.Sebastian's College, Moratuwa
- Occupation(s): Singer, songwriter, stenographer
- Spouse: Iris Jones
- Children: 4
- Relatives: Wally Bastiansz (uncle)
- Musical career
- Genres: Baila
- Years active: 1956–2008
- Labels: Torana

Anton Jones (Sinhala: ඇන්ටන් ජෝන්ස්; 3 June 1937 – 21 February 2016) was a Sri Lankan singer and songwriter. Considered as a prominent Baila singer in Sri Lanka, Jones had several hits, including Mini Gawuma and Uyala Pihala. His songs are composed about special events that took place in this country, thus becoming the only singer who sang based on real events.

== Personal life ==
He was born on 3 June 1937 in Colombo to a Burgher family in Hulftsdorp. His father was a businessman. He is an alumnus of St. Sebastian Maha Vidyalaya, Hulftsdorp. He has one elder sister.

For the duration of his musical career, Jones also worked as an English stenographer for the Bank of Ceylon and private company Julius & Cruise since 1963. He retired in 1997 completing 35 years of service.

Jones was married to longtime partner Iris Jones. Jones first met Iris at the Talawila Church in 1978. Iris had his education from St. Mary's Convent in Chilaw. They got married on August 31, 1960, at St. Lucia Church, Kotahena. The couple has two sons – Tyrone, Roshan; and two daughters – Roshini and Priyanka.

In 2010, while riding a motorcycle, he lost his left arm and fell off the bike twice. The next morning when he was getting ready to go for the medicine he fell in the bathroom. He was rushed to Nawaloka and received treatment for one week. After seven years of clutches, Jones was admitted to the hospital again on 15 February 2016. He could not eat properly, so depended on drink only. He returned home on 18 February. However, he died on 21 February 2016 at the age of 79 while receiving treatment at the Colombo South Teaching Hospital in Kalubowila. His remains were laid to rest at his residence at Kawdana, Dehiwala Road and later moved to National Art Gallery.

== Career ==
He entered music under the guidance of his friend Wally Bastiansz in the early 1950s. Jones played a member of Bastiansz's band, initially got to join the choir. In 1958 he performed for the first time in front of a live audience for a Radio Ceylon event with the song Kanthoruwa Kanthoruwa.

Jones had released 37 cassettes and eight CDs and often tackled contemporary events in his songs which include Maru Sira, Sepala Ekanayake, Kanthoruwa, Premawathi Manamperi and Podi Vijay. He had sung only a single duet in his career, with Angeline Gunathilake. Many of his songs were composed by Jones himself. He also composed many of the songs.

His most recent album Sebe Siddhi discussed the effects of the tsunami that hit Sri Lanka. He also joined the cast with the song Komala Papa sung for the film Ohoma Hondada.

In December 2015, a tribute ceremony for Jones was organized by the Hanwella Branch of the All Ceylon Middle East Service Organization.
