= High Security Zones (Sri Lanka) =

Government reserved military area in Sri Lanka

High Security Zones (HSZs) in Sri Lanka refer to specific geographic areas designated by the Government of Sri Lanka as militarized zones with restricted civilian access, primarily for national security reasons. These zones have played a significant role during and after the Sri Lankan Civil War, particularly in Colombo, the Northern Province and Eastern Province, as well as other parts of the island.

During World War II, the British military requisitioned private buildings for use as barracks and hospitals, these included private schools, as well as private residences such as Tintagel, Mumtaz Mahal, Obeyesekere Walawwa, Saifee Villa.

Following the 2022 Sri Lankan protests, the government declared several areas in Colombo as High Security Zones these included the Parliament, the Supreme Court, the High Court and Magistrate Court in Colombo, Attorney General’s Department, Presidential Secretariat, President’s House, headquarters of the Armed Forces and Police, Ministry of Defence, Prime Minister’s Office, Temple Trees, residencies of Defence Secretary, Armed Forces Commanders and the IGP.

The Public Security Ordinance, enacted shortly after independence, grants the government broad powers to declare areas as "security zones" during times of emergency or threat to public order. Under the PSO, authorities may impose restrictions on movement, assembly, and occupation of land within designated areas to maintain security.

Since 2024 the Sri Lankan government has reduced the extent of High Security Zones and started a process of returning the seized landholdings back to their rightful owners. This initiative was part of a wider approach to land reform in parts of Sri Lanka, and was in part the government's response to long-standing protests against the land sequestrations from within the Tamil community. In a ceremony in May 2025, President Dissanayake distributed 1,286 land deeds to residents in the Jaffna district under the "Urumaya" programme.
