= Hela Havula =

Sri Lankan literary organization

- හෙළ හවුල
- Formation: 11 January 1941; 85 years ago
- Founder: Munidasa Kumaratunga
- Website: helahavula.org

Hela Havula is a national movement in Sri Lanka dedicated to the preservation, promotion, and development of the worldly trinity of the Sinhalese – the Sinhalese language, race, and land. Founded on 11 January 1941 by Cumaratunga Munidasa, during British colonial rule, it emerged as a national movement advocating for the independence of Ceylon. The organization gained formal recognition as a statutory body through the Hela Havula Incorporation Act No. 38 of 1992, passed by the Parliament of Sri Lanka. Renowned for its contributions to Sinhalese language reform, poetry, grammar, music, and nationalistic discourse, Hela Havula publishes the esteemed journal Subasa, which serves as a key platform for linguistic scholarship and national dialogue. As it marks its 84th anniversary, Hela Havula, under the leadership of Srinath Ganewatta, continues its mission by offering free language proficiency courses, conducting public lectures, and fostering a profound appreciation for Sinhalese heritage across the country. Hela Havula is the only organisation in Sri Lanka to protect and uplift the Sinhalese language, the Sinhalese race, and the Sinhalese land.

== History ==
Kumaratunga started a magazine called 'Subasa' on July 10, 1939, with the intention of launching a new magazine in an effort to preserve the Sinhala language. By this time he had gained a reputation in the world of linguistics and was financially strong as his book also sold well. After the commencement of 'Subasa' in 1939, he completely got rid of Sanskrit and adopted the 'Pure Sinhala' language. He also adapted the local names of the writers who contributed to 'Subasa' magazine according to 'Pure Sinhala'. By the time of the publication of 'Lakmini Pahana' and 'Subasa' magazines, many of those who provided poems and novels also knew Kumaratunga by the 1940s and had gathered around him.

With the re-launch of the Lakmini Pahana newspaper in 1934, he became more and more active in socio-cultural activities. During this time, Kumaratunga briefly associated with S. W. R. D. Bandaranaike's 'Sinhala Maha Sabha'. Also, during the 'Lakmini Pahana' period, on January 5, 1935, Kumaratunga initiated the establishment of a ten-member organization called the 'Sinhala Samajaya' at the Pahan Paharuwa office in Maradana, Colombo.

Jayantha Weerasekera gave the name 'Hela Hawula' to the well-wishers who had gathered at Kumaratunga Munidasa's house. Founder members include Munidasa Kumaratunga, Sri Charles de Silva (teacher, Linguist, author), Jayantha Weerasekera (journalist), Raipiyel Tennakoon (poet) and Amarasiri Gunawadu (poet). Anton Perera Jayamanne, then a lecturer at the Maggona Teacher Training College, became the chairman of the first meeting. Afterwards, Kumaratunga Munidasa explained the objectives of 'Hela Havula', whereas Eddie Panandu and Abaram Gamhewa were appointed as its first thrift (treasurer) by consensus. It is stated that the first meeting of the 'Hela Havula' was held on 15 February 1941 at the Mahanama College premises in Panadura where Kumaratunga Munidasa, became its chairman.

Under the guidance of Kumaratunga Munidasa, the 'Hela Havula' initially held meetings in and around Panadura and Kalutara, and later in cities such as Moratuwa and later in Buddhist schools such as Ananda College, Colombo. The main focus of those meetings was to make the public aware of the correct rules of Sinhala grammar and to conduct drama and music programs in Sinhala. In a short period of time, several branches have been established such as Southwestern Hela Hawula and Matara Hela Hawula. Arrangements were made to hold the first meeting of the Southwest Hela Hawula on December 13, 1941, at Ambalangoda. Although thugs were sent by the British that day to kill Kumaratunga Munidasa, however, the attacks were successfully repulsed.

By the beginning of the 1960s, the Hela Hawula was the strongest force in the country in terms of the Sinhala language and literature. At that time the 'Hela Havula' had branches not only in Ahangama, Unawatuna, Rathgama, Galle, Kalutara and Kandy but also in schools such as Mahinda College in Galle and S. Thomas' College, Mount Lavinia. After the death of Munidasa on 18 June 1949, Jayantha Weerasekera became its acting chairman. He held these posts until his death on June 18, 1949. Then the great poet Raipiyel Tennakoon took the responsibility of leading the Hela Hawula where he held the position until his death on 8 March 1965.

On 8 March 1965, Amarasiri Gunawadu assumed duties as the third Chairman of the 'Hela Havula'. Under his leadership for completed 25 years, he held its Silver Celebrations for two days at Rex House, Borella and Ananda College, Colombo. After the death of Amarasiri Gunawadu on July 8, 1977, Ven. Kodagoda Gnanaloka Thero became the chairperson. The 50th-anniversary celebrations of the Hela Hawule have been held at the Colombo Public Library under the leadership of Ven. Warakagoda Silruwan Thero who became the Chairman after the demise of Gnanaloka Thero. In December 1991, A. D. Chandrareskara became the sixth Chairman. During this period 'Hela Hawula' has been recognized as a statutory body by the adoption of the Hela Hawula Establishment Act No. 38 in the Parliament of Sri Lanka Act No. 1992. Thereafter, Arisen Ahubudu, Anandapiya Kudathihi and Amarasiri Ponnamperuma have been the Chairman of the 'Hela Havula' respectively. From November 2012 to date, Sri Nath Ganewatta is the Chairman.

The movement advocates the replacement of Sanskritic words with Hela (native) versions. It was incorporated in 1985. Besides founder members, other prominent members included:

== Notable members ==
Given below is an incomplete list of prominent past members of Hela Havula, arranged in the alphabetical order of their surnames:

- Abhayagunawardena, V. W. (Wilmot Abhayagunawardena)
- Ahubudu, Arisen (Aryasena Ashubodha) Arisen Ahubudu
- Ahubudu, Sanda (Chandra Ashubodha)
- Ahutusu, Amarasen (Amarasena Ashuthosha)
- Alagiyawanna, K. P.
- Alwis, Dr. William
- Alwis, Watson
- Ananda Maitreya Nayaka Thera, Ven. Balangoda
- Ananda Thera, Ven. Ahangama
- Balasuriya, P. B. B. A. P. B. Balasuriya
- Chandajothi Thera, Ven. Mirisse
- Chandrasekara, A. D.
- Coparahewa, Sandadas (Chandradasa Coperahewa)
- Cumaratunga, Dhamsiri (Dharmasri Cumaratunga)
- Cumaratunga, Munidasa Cumaratunga Munidasa (founder)
- Cumaratunga, Nandanapala
- de Silva, D. V. Richard
- de Silva, Eng. Aelian (Totwatta Don Emmanuel Aelian de Silva)
- de Silva, Nelson
- de Silva, Peiris
- Dennis, Visharad Ivor
- Dias, D. D.
- Dissanayake, Hubert
- Dissanayake, Mahanama
- Edmund, Dr. K. B. A.
- Fernando, Eddie
- Fonseka, Henry Martinus
- Gallage, Punyawardhana
- Gamhewa, Abiram (Abraham Gamhewa)
- Gnanaloka Thera, Ven. Kodagoda
- Gunapala, D. G. U.
- Gunapala, E. W.
- Gunaruwan, H. A. M. (H. A. M. Guneratne)
- Gunatillake, Simon
- Gunewadu, Gamhewa (Gamhewa Gunewardena)
- Gunawadu, Meddewatte Amarasiri (Don Simon Amarasiri Gunawardena)
- Jayakody, Fr. Marcelline Fr. Marcelline Jayakody
- Jayamaha, Koggala Wellala
- Jayamanne, Anton Perera
- Jayasekara, Aberuwan (Abhayaratna Jayasekara)
- Jayasekara, D. S.
- Jayawardena, Pinto
- Jayaweera, Vesantha
- Kalanaruwan, Sumanadas (Sumanadasa Kalyanaratne)
- Kodagoda, Prof. Nandadasa Nandadasa Kodagoda
- Kudathihi, Anadapiya (Anandapriya Kudachchi)
- Kulasuriya, Prof. Ananda Salgado
- Kumarage, Kiriwatthuduwe J. D.
- Kumarasinghe, Kitsiri
- Liyanage, Jinadas (Jinadasa Liyanage)
- Lokubandara, Hon. W. J. M. W. J. M. Lokubandara
- Madurawati, C.
- Maitreepala, M.
- Malalasekara, Sirisena
- Metias, L.
- Mohotti, D. D.
- Mohotti, D. H.
- Pannapala, K. W.
- Pemadasa, Prof. Alawattagoda
- Perera, Fr. Moses
- Perera, Koralawelle K. J.
- Perera, Prof. A. D. T. E.
- Piyasoma, Boosse T.
- Prananda, Kuliyapitiye Sri
- Puranandu, Jinadas Gunasekara (Jinadasa Gunasekara Fernando)
- Rahula Nayaka Thera, Ven. Ampitiye
- Ranawella, Prof. Sirimal
- Sabihela, Alaw-Isi (Surabiyel de Alwis)
- Samarakoon, D. A.
- Samarakoon, Wajirasena
- Santha, Visharad Sunil (Badde Liyanage Don Joseph John) Sunil Santha
- Seelaratana Thera, Ven. Warakagoda
- Senadheera, Dr. Gunapala
- Silva, S. J. P.
- Sumanaratana Thera, Ven. Sitinamaluwe
- Surasena, Totagamuwe K.
- Susith, C. P. (C. P. T. Susith)
- Tennakoon, Raphael Raipiyel Tennakoon
- Thilakawardena, Gamini
- Thotawatta, Titus (Totawatte Don Manuel Titus de Silva)
- Vajirajnana Nayaka Thera, Ven. Palane
- Vitharana, Prof. Vinnie
- Weerakoon, Gandarawatte D. D. N.
- Weerasekara, Jayantha
- Weerasinghe, Prof. S. G. M.
- Wickremasekara, D. H.
- Wijayaratna, P. A. S.
- Wijayaratna, R.
- Wijesena, K. D. F.
- Wikramasena, W. S.
- Wimal, M. A.
- Wimalatissa Thera, Ven. Dikwelle
