= Vincent Somapala =

Vincent Somapala වින්සන්ට් සෝමපාල
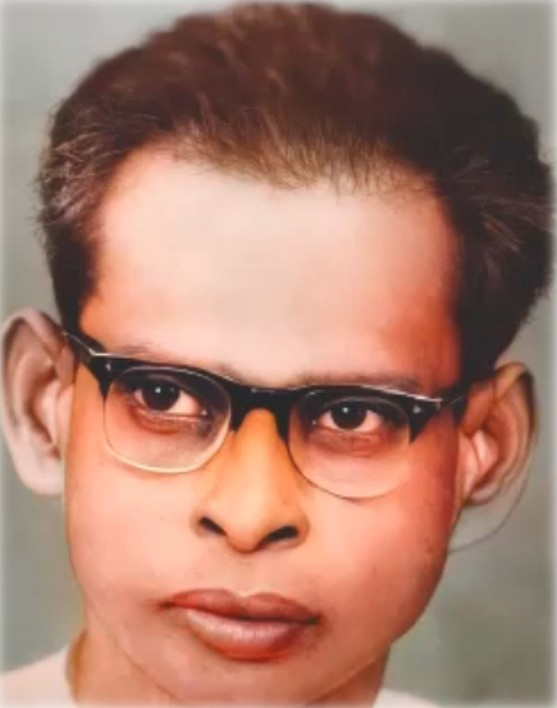
- Born: 19 May 1906; Sarikkamulla, Panadura, Sri Lanka
- Died: 7 June 1989 (aged 83)
- Occupations: composer, musician, lyricist, author, and teacher
- Years active: 1934 - 1989
- Known for: Sri Lankan music

Vincent Somapala (Sinhala: වින්සන්ට් සෝමපාල), (19 May 1906 – 7 June 1989) was a Sri Lankan composer, musician, lyricist, author, and teacher.

== Early life and education ==
Vincent Somapala was born on 19 May 1906, in Sarikkamulla, Panadura, the eldest son of the veteran Nadagam artist, G. Don Martelis.

He received his early education in Panadura Gorakana Buddhist Mixed School. He was a highly learned scholar with exceptional proficiency in languages and literature. Fluent in Sinhala, Pali, Sanskrit, and English, he refined his language skills under the guidance of Weliwitiye Sri Soratha Thero, Palane Vajiragnana Thero, as well as through his studies at Panadura Sri Sumangala College and St. Anthony's Night School in Moratuwa. His music teachers included J. Sadiris Silva and H. W. Rupasinha.

After completing his school education, he joined the editorial staff of the newspapers Swadesha Mitraya, Lakwasiya, Lakmini Pahana, and Lakmina.

However, he felt that the role of a journalist was a hindrance to his musical journey, so he recommenced his musical journey. For this, he received the support of scholars such as Kumaratunga Munidasa, P. de S. Kularatne, and Jayantha Weerasekara.

== Career ==
In 1934, he entered the field of writing by compiling the scholarly work named 'Geetha Vidya (ගීත විද්‍යා)'.

In 1938, he was entrusted with the task of composing the melodies for 'Hela Miyasiya (හෙළ මියැසිය)', a work compiled by Kumaratunga Munidasa with the aim of establishing Sri Lankan music.

In 1946, he was appointed as the music instructor at Piliyandala Central College, making him Sri Lanka's one of the first music teachers.

The current Sri Lanka's national anthem, which was chosen as the national anthem in 1949, was previously known as 'Namo Namo Matha (නමෝ නමෝ මාතා)'. It was revised to 'Sri Lanka Matha (ශ්‍රී ලංකා මාතා)' under the guidance of him.

In 1951, he was appointed as a lecturer at Katukurunda Teachers' Training College, and in 1953, he was promoted to music inspector.

Songs such as 'Sri Rahula Himige Name (ශ්‍රී රාහුල හිමිගේ නාමේ)', 'Mawpiyo Aadee (මව්පියො ආදී)' and 'Silpa Satara Loke (ශිල්ප සතර ලෝකේ)', which were very popular during the Gramophone era, were his compositions.

He conducted numerous music research with the aim of building a local identity, and for his work 'Geetha Kala Nidhi (ගීත කලා නිධි)', he was awarded the title 'Sangeetha Visharada.' This was the first instance where that title was bestowed upon someone for a specific work.

He contributed to the field of music with several more music texts, including 'Thala Gnanaya (තාල ඥානය)’, 'Dasathala Lakshanaya (දශ තාලලක්ෂණය),' 'Pasal Gee (පාසැල් ගී),' and ‘Bhavika Geetha (භාවික ගීත).

He founded the Gayatri Art Institute in Kesbewa, which became a nurturing ground for musical talent. His son, Wijesiri Govinda, later relocated the Gayatri Art Institute to Piliyandala and continued to run it until late 2022.

He cultivated a renowned generation of students, including Premadasa Mudunkotuwa, Basil Mihiripenna, Neela Wickramasinghe and Punya Kathriarachchi. His passion for music deeply influenced his family, with his children Jayantha Aravinda, Wijesiri Govinda, and Neetha Mangalika continuing his legacy through their own contributions to the musical landscape of Sri Lanka and beyond.

He was honoured with the Kala Suri award in 1982, in recognition of his significant contributions to Sri Lankan music.
