= Tom Neville Wynne-Jones =

- Born: 19 November 1893; Swansea, Glamorgan, Wales
- Died: 21 June 1979 (aged 85); Frinton-on-Sea, Essex, England
- Occupations: public servant; architect, civil engineer
- Known for: Chief Architect of Ceylon
- Term: 1932 - 1953
- Predecessor: Austin Woodeson
- Successor: Homi Billimoria
- Spouse: Mabel
- Parent: Augustus Theophrastus Morgan

Tom Neville Wynne-Jones CBE, CMG (19 November 1893 - 21 June 1979) was a Welsh architect, who served as the Chief Architect of Ceylon.

Tom Neville Wynne-Jones was born on 19 November 1893 in Swansea, Glamorgan, Wales, the youngest son of Augustus Theophrastus Morgan (1857–1936). He studied in Cardiff and served as a second lieutenant in the Royal Engineers in the first world war, between 1915 and 1919.

In 1919 he joined the Ceylon Civil Service, taking up a role as an architectural assistant in the Public Works Department. In 1932 he was formally appointed as Chief Architect. During his career he was responsible for over 2,000 projects, including significant public buildings such as the Survey Department on Kirula Road, Radio Ceylon studios, Panagoda Cantonment (Ceylon Light Infantry headquarters), the Independence Memorial Hall and the Cathedral of Christ the Living Saviour.

As Ceylon had no professional architectural body Wynne-Jones joined the Engineering Association of Ceylon and in 1950 was elected the Association's president.

In 1943 New Year Honours he was appointed an Officer of the British Empire, in the 1950 New Year Honours a Commander of the British Empire and in the 1954 New Year Honours was granted a Companion of the Order of St Michael and St George.

He retired from his position as chief architect in 1953, after the country's independence, and was succeeded by Homi Billimoria. Wynne-Jones however continued to work for the Public Works Department and was the main consulting architect for the University of Peradeniya, succeeding Shirley de Alwis upon de Alwis' death.

He later returned to England, where he died on 21 June 1979, at the age of 85, at Frinton-on-Sea, Essex.

== Notable projects ==
- Boake Gates (1937)
- Independence Memorial Hall (1949)
- Panagoda Cantonment (1953)
- Cathedral of Christ the Living Saviour (1967)
