= National Defence College, Sri Lanka =

National Defence College
- Type: Defence Service Training Institute
- Established: 2021
- Commandant: Major General Sujeewa Senarath Yapa
- Location: Colombo, Sri Lanka
- Website: www.ndc.ac.lk

The National Defence College, located in Colombo, is the defence service training institute and highest seat of strategic learning for officers of the Sri Lankan Armed Forces, Sri Lanka Police and the Public Services. This is a very prestigious course attended only by selected officers of One-Star rank and public servants of the senior grade of class 1. Foreign course participants from friendly foreign countries including India are also invited to attend. This college provides strategic leadership to the Government of Sri Lanka in national and international security matters and also acts as a think tank.

== History ==
After Ceylon gained its independence in 1948 and the regular forces were formed, senior officers of the Ceylon Army, Royal Ceylon Navy and the Royal Ceylon Air Force attended the Imperial Defence College (IDC) in the United Kingdom as the armed forces expanded, senior officers attended the Royal College of Defence Studies, National Defence College, India, National Defence University, Islamabad, National Defence College, Bangladesh and the PLA National Defense University. With the limited number scholarships available to these institutes, the Ministry of Defense announced that national defence college will be established in Colombo in 2020.

== Location ==
In 2020, it was proposed to establish the new NDC at Visumpaya, the former state guest house. It was eventually established at its present location on Galle Road at Kollupitiya in Colombo. The British-era building known as Mumtaz Mahal designed by Homi Billimoria was built in 1928 and served during World War II as the residence of Admiral Sir Geoffrey Layton in his role as Commander-in-Chief, Ceylon the first unified command for British military, naval and air units in an area of operation. Mumtaz Mahal then served as the official residence of the Speaker.

== Course ==
The National Defence and Strategic Study Course will span for 11 months consisting of 2 semesters, covering nine subjects and include local and overseas visits. On completion of the course, the participants can use the post nominal letters ndc and be awarded a MSc degree from the General Sir John Kotelawala Defence University. Further study could lead to a MPhil degree from the General Sir John Kotelawala Defence University.

== See also ==
- Ministry of Defence (Sri Lanka)
- Military academies in Sri Lanka
- Defence Services Command and Staff College
