= Woodeson =

Woodeson is a surname. Notable people with the surname include:

- Austin Woodeson (1873–1935), British architect
- Nicholas Woodeson (born 1949), English actor
