= Raipiyel Tennakoon =

Sri Lankan poet (1899–1965)

- රැයිපියල් තෙන්නකෝන්
- Born: Tennakoon Arachchige Don Raphael; 19 December 1899; Negambo, British Ceylon
- Died: 8 March 1965 (aged 65); Gampaha, Sri Lanka
- Other names: Raphael Tennekoon
- Education: Raddoluwa Buddhist School
- Occupations: Poet, writer, teacher, historian
- Years active: 1925–1965
- Children: 3

Mahakavi Kiwisuru Tennakoon Arachchige Don Raphael (19 December 1899 – 8 March 1965; Sinhala: රැයිපියල් තෙන්නකෝන්), popularly known as Raipiyel Tennakoon or Raphael Tennekoon, was a prominent Sri Lankan poet, teacher principal, historian and a writer.

== Personal life ==
He was born in 1918 in Ganepola Walallavitigalle village in Negombo, Sri Lanka as the youngest child of the family with six siblings. His father Tennakoon Arachchige Don Suddappu was an Ayurvedic doctor. His mother was Kotarupe Abeysekera Wannaku Arachchige Dona Francesina Hamine. He had one elder brother and five elder sisters.

He received his primary education from Raddoluwa Buddhist School in Negombo. He learned Sanskrit and Pali from Ven. Pagnananda Thero of Raddolugama Temple and developed his knowledge of the language from Ven. Dhammananda Thero who was the second in command of the temple. Meanwhile, he studied English from Kotugoda Jayawardena Notary Ralahamy. Raipiyel became the favorite student of Heenatiyana David de Silva, the first teacher of Raddoluwa Buddhist School.

The couple had one son: Keerthi and two daughters: Neetha and Vineetha. His grandson Kithsilu Wickramasinghe is a musician.

He died on 8 March 1965 in Parakum Deniya village, Gampaha.

== Career ==
=== Teaching ===
As a child, Raphael intended to become a driver, thinking that the driver would make more money than the teacher. However, he later turned to teaching. Therefore after finishing school, he attended to Teacher Training College where he met Kumaratunga Munidasa who was the principal of the college at that time. At the College, Raipiyel excelled in history, geography and literature. Kumaratunga later offered the post of lecturer due to his excellence. He became a member of Hela Havula led by Munidasa. Raphael Tennakoon, Jayantha Weerasekera and Amarasiri Gunawadu were the leading figures in the Hela Havula. Later he became the head of Balapitiya Training College. After the death of Jayantha Weerasekera on 18 June 1949, Raipiyel took the responsibility of leading the Hela Hawula. He held the position until 8 March 1965.

However, rulers harassed his skills in several times and ended his career as the head of the Training College after few years. Seven years from 1952 to 1957, he was the principal of Gangodawila School at Wijerama Junction. To honor him, the college was named as Raipiyel Tennakoon College. It is currently connected to the Maharagama President's College. After serving as the principal of several schools, Raipiyel finally retired from the education administrative career.

=== Poetry ===
In 1939, he composed the poetry with 557 poems and published with the title Wawuluwa. He was forty years old at the time of writing of Wawuluwa. In addition, he wrote the poems: Kukulu Hewilla, De Vinaya, Pandu Ambula, Ruppe Andaraya, Muluthena Andaraya and Gamayanaya with 5302 verses.

In 1954, D. B. Dhanapala, the editor of the Lankadeepa newspaper, and Mahanama Dissanayake, the deputy editor, started a competition to select a national 'Maha Kaviya' (epic poet). The aim of this competition was to select a poet who can write the history of the Sinhala nation of 2500 years for the 1954 Sinhala New Year. Raipiyel later won the competition and received the Opportunity to write the history of Sinhala nation in 2500 verses from the time Prince Vijaya came to Sri Lanka to the time of the Prime Minister Sir John Kotelawala. Then in 1956, this book 'Sinhala Vansaya' was published as a Saman publication. He published nineteen books of poetry. His six great poems include: Sak Pubuduwa, Kuveniwata, Gamayanaya, Amuna, Parangi Samaya, Kopi Andaraya.

Later Kumaratunga Munidasa honored Raipiyel with the honorary tile 'Kiwisuru'. On the occasion of the 2500th anniversary of the Sinhala nation, he was honored as 'Mahakavi' who wrote the great poem 'Sinhala Vamsaya' with 2500 poems. The poetry later won state awards. His prose essay 'Kawuduwa' was published in 1954. His other prose works include Giyakala, Baspara, and literary critics such as Ape Kavi and Ape Asun Kavi. He also wrote commentaries on the Guttila, and Sandesha Kavya such as the Hansa, Gira and Selalihini.

== Legacy ==
In 2013, the house where Raipiyel lived has been completed as the 'Raphael Tennakoon Memorial Studio' known as Susara Studio.
