= Tintagel (disambiguation) =

Tintagel is a village and civil parish in Cornwall, England, UK.

Tintagel may also refer to:

- Tintagel (Bax), a 1919 musical composition by Arnold Bax
- Tintagel Castle, near the village
- HMS Tintagel Castle, a World War II era ship of the Royal Navy
- Tintagel Colombo, residence of Sri Lankan Prime Ministers Solomon and Sirimavo Bandaranaike
- Tintagel, three drawings by John William Inchbold
- Tintagel, an English Christian folk rock band who performed at the Greenbelt Festival in 1991
