= James Smither =

James George Smither
- Born: 1833; Ireland
- Died: 1910 (aged 76–77); London, England
- Occupation: Architect
- Practice: Ceylon Public Works Department
- Buildings: All Saints' Church, Galle, Grand Oriental Hotel, former Colombo Town Hall, Jaffna Clock Tower, Colombo General Hospital, National Museum of Colombo

James George Smither FRIBA (1833–1910) was an Irish architect and a Ceylonese public servant.

He served as Ceylon's first Government Architect in the Public Works Department, for eighteen years, between 1865 and 1883.

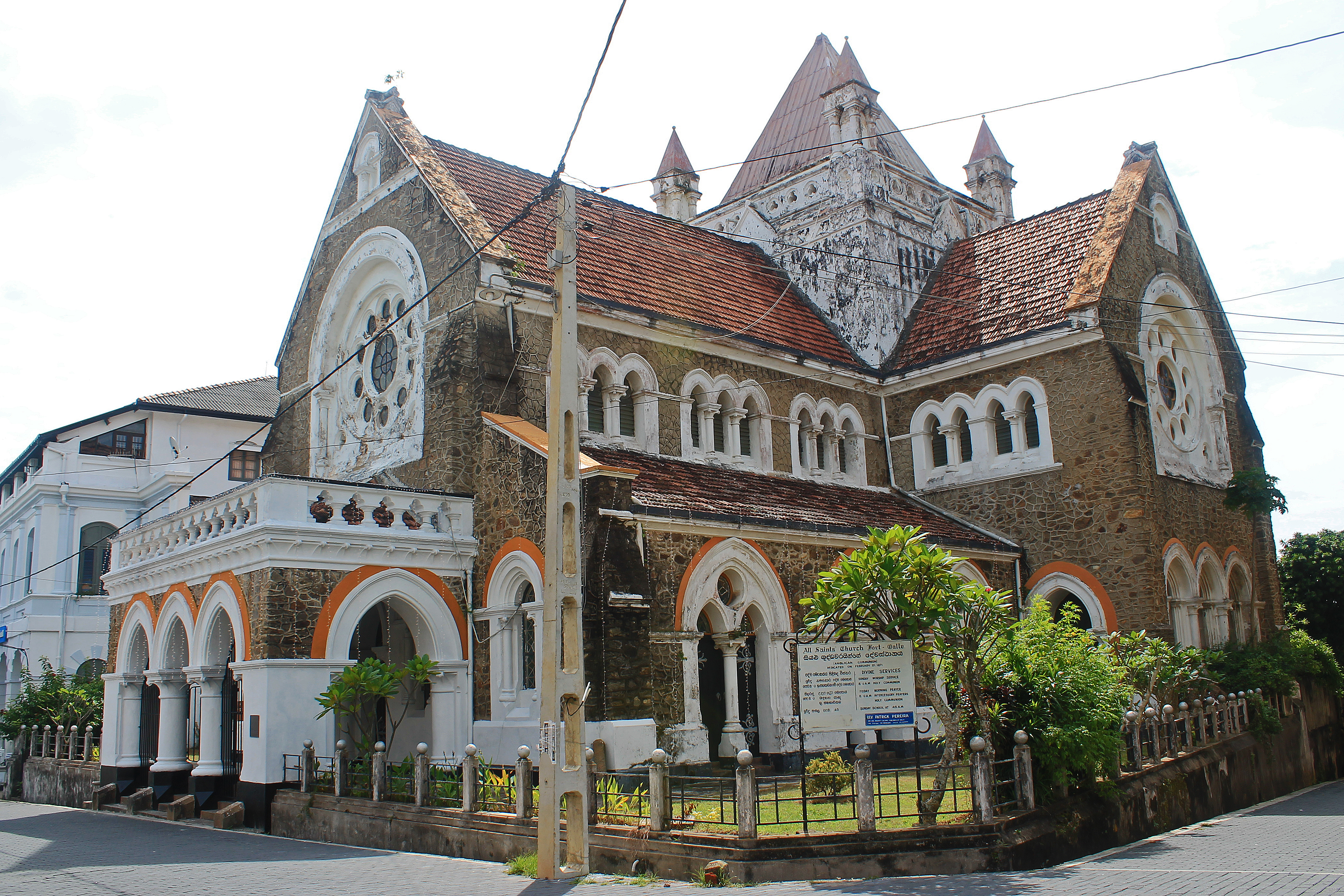
All Saints' Church in Galle Fort

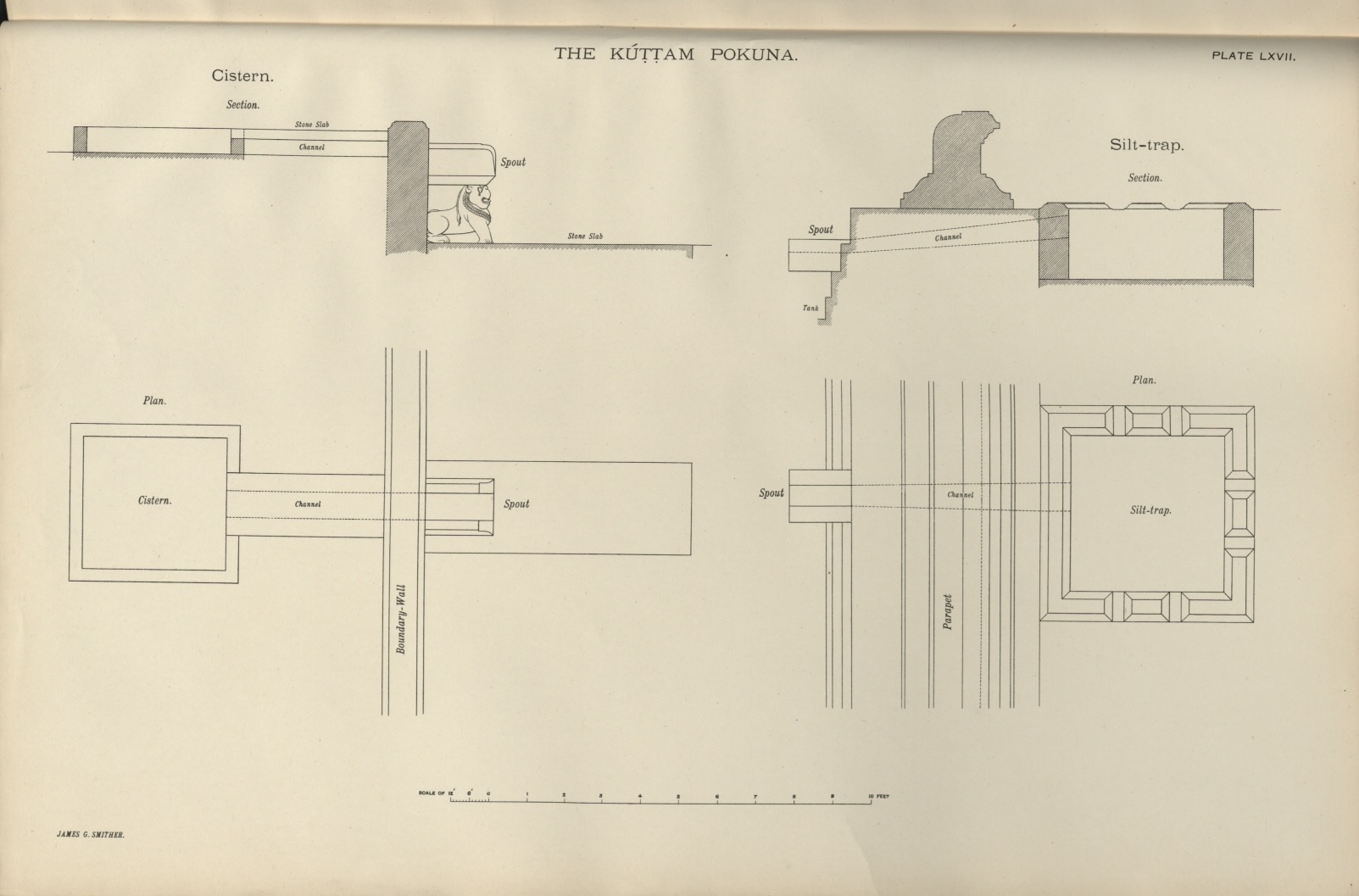
Architectural drawing of Kuttam Pokuna in Architectural remains: Anuradhapura, Ceylon, comprising the Dagabas and certain other ancient ruined structures

In 1869 he was made a fellow of the Royal Institute of British Architects. The same year he designed the Victorian Gothic Revival style All Saints' Church in Galle Fort.

In 1873 he was responsible for designing and overseeing the reconstruction/conversion of the Grand Oriental Hotel and the construction of the former Colombo Town Hall, together with the adjoining public markets (Edinburgh Hall). The structure has a "Cruet-like top" and was flanked and backed by the Edinburgh Hall, so called because His Royal Highness, Prince Alfred Duke of Edinburgh, laid the foundation stone for the building in April 1870.

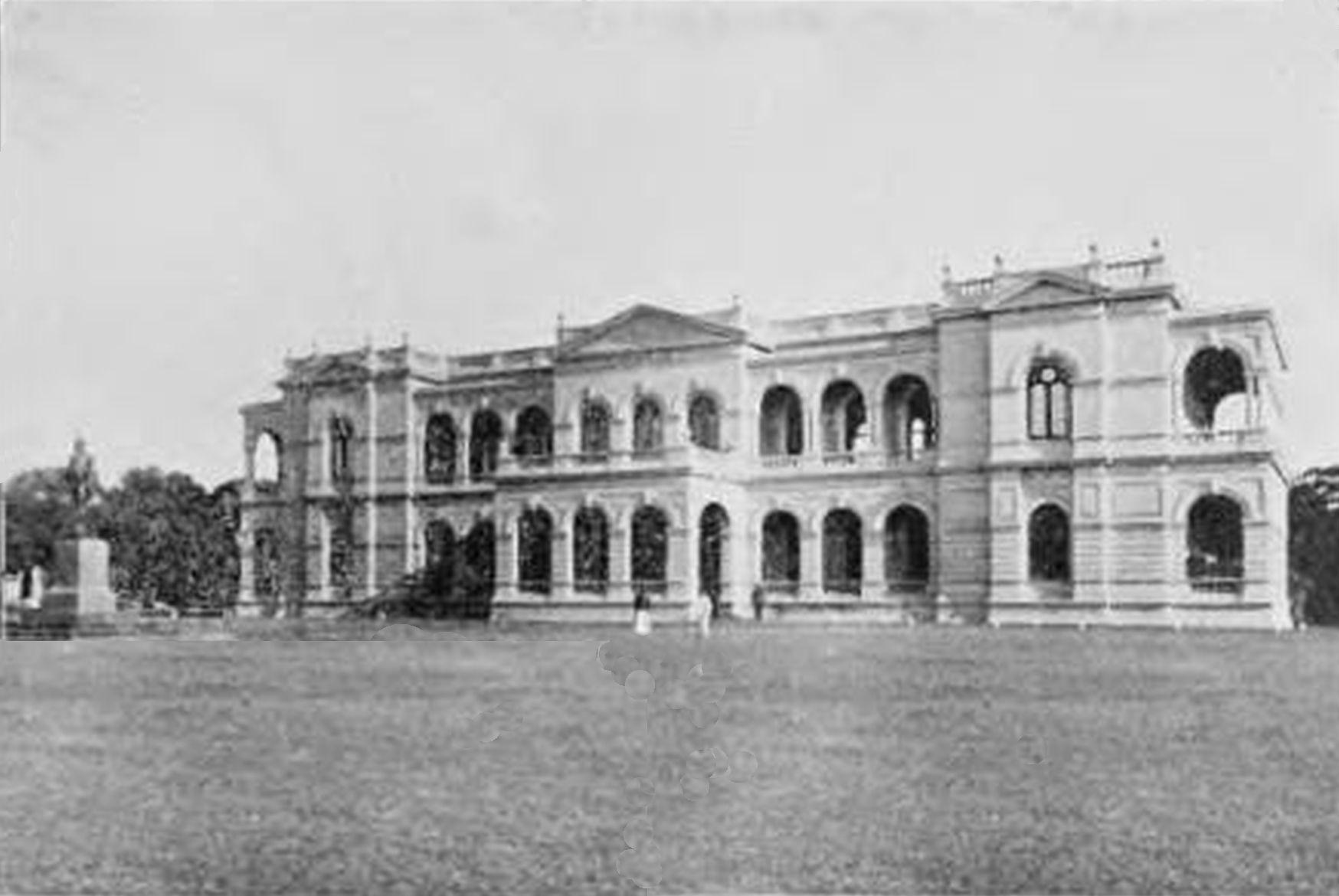
National Museum of Colombo in 1896

Between 1873 and 1875, under the direction of Governor Sir William Gregory, a complete site survey of structural remains at Anuradhapura was undertaken. The work was carried out by Smither, who subsequently published in 1894, Architectural Remains Anuradhapura, Ceylon: the Dugabas and Certain Other Ancient Ruined Structures, which comprised information on Anuradhapura's stupas and other ancient ruined structures.

In 1875 Smither designed the Jaffna Clock Tower and was also responsible for designing the Colombo General Hospital.

In 1875 he designed the National Museum of Colombo, a two-storey Italianate-style building with open verandahs, arches and pillars with ornate capitals and mouldings.

In 1879 Smither designed a block of outbuildings at Coole Park, County Galway, Ireland for Sir William Gregory.

Smither retired to England but was called upon in 1886 to design and carry out the buildings of the Ceylon Court at the Colonial and Indian Exhibition in London (including the 'Ceylon Tea House' and the 'Ceylon Porch' at the old Imperial Institute). The dagoba forming the central feature and other works for the Ceylon Court at the 1888 International Exhibition of Science, Art and Industry in Glasgow. In 1889 he designed the ornamental screens enclosing the Ceylon Court and other works at the Exposition Universelle.

He retired from architectural practice in 1899 and died an invalid in 1910, at the age of 78, at his residence in Camberwell. He was buried in the South Metropolitan Cemetery on 6 January 1911.

== Bibliography ==
- Smither, James George (1894). Architectural Remains Anuradhapura, Ceylon: the Dagobas and Certain Other Ancient Ruined Structures. London: Cooper and Budd.
