= Sri Lanka Armed Forces Training Institutions =

The Sri Lankan Armed Forces have established numerous academies and staff colleges across Sri Lanka for the purpose of training professional soldiers in military sciences, warfare command and strategy, and associated technologies.

== Ministry of Defense ==
Several education and military establishments come under the direct preview of the Ministry of Defence and admit members of the armed forces, police and civilians.

Kotelawala Defence University : The General Sir John Kotelawala Defence University (KDU) (Sinhala: ජෙනරාල් සර් ජෝන් කොතලාවල ආරක්ෂක විශ්ව විද්‍යාලය), Ratmalana was founded in 1981 as the Kotelawala Defence Academy to conduct bachelor's degree programs for military cadets from all three services. It has since expanded to include post graduate studies and admits both armed forces personal and civilians.

National Defence College : The National Defence College, Colombo (NDC), established in 2020 is the highest level of strategic training for senior officers of the armed forces, police and civil servants.

Defence Services Command and Staff College : The Defence Services Command and Staff College (DSCSC) (Sinhala: ආරක්ෂක සේවා අණ හා මාණ්ඩලික විද්‍යාලය), Makola, established on 1 January 1997 as the Sri Lanka Army Command and Staff College serves as the principle staff college for the armed forces.

Language Training School: The Language Training School, Kotmale is the principle school of Languages for the armed forces.

Defence Services School : The Defence Services School, Colombo was established on 17 of January 2007 as a national school for the children of armed forces and police personnel.

== Sri Lanka Army ==
The institutions under the Army Training Command that train officers and other ranks of the Sri Lanka Army are:

1. Sri Lanka Military Academy (SLMA)(Sinhala: ශ්‍රී ලංකා යුද්ධ හමුදා විද්‍යාපීඨය) - The Sri Lanka Military Academy, Diyatalawa provides initial training for all regular army officers.
2. Officer Career Development Centre (OCDC)(Sinhala: නිලධාරි ප්‍රගමන ප්‍රවර්ධන මධ්‍යස්ථානය) - The Officer Career Development Centre provides mid-career training officers.
3. Army School of Logistics (ASL)(Sinhala: යුද්ධ හමුදා භට කාර්ය සම්පාදන විද්‍යාලය) - The Army School of Logistics provides mid-career training for logistics officers.
4. Volunteer Force Training School (VFTS) - Training for volunteer force personal
5. Army Training School (ATS)(Sinhala: යුද්ධ හමුදා පුහුණු පාසල)
6. Infantry Training Centre (ITC)(Sinhala: පාබල පුහුණු මධ්‍යස්ථානය)
7. Combat Training School (CTS)
8. Army Physical Training School
9. Marksmanship and Sniper Training School (MSTS)(Sinhala: ප්‍රගුණ හා සැඟවුණු වෙඩික්කරු පුහුණු පාසල)
10. Army Vocational Training Center
11. Institute of Peace Support Operations Training (IPSOTSL)(Sinhala: ශ්‍රී ලංකා සාම සාධක මෙහෙයුම් පුහුණු ආයතනය) - Training for United Nations peacekeeping.
12. Army Physical Education Centre (Sinhala: යුද්ධ හමුදා ශාරීරික අධ්‍යන පුහුණු පාසල)
13. Commando Regiment Training School
14. Commando Regimental Special Warfare Training School
15. Special Forces Combat Diving Training School
16. Special Forces Training School
17. Special Forces Jungle Warfare Training School

== Sri Lanka Navy ==
The Sri Lanka Navy has numerous training establishments;

- Naval & Maritime Academy - SLN Dockyard
- Advanced Naval Training Centre - SLNS Nipuna
- Naval Artificer Training Institute - SLNS Thakshila
- Naval Recruit Training Centre - SLNS Shiksha
- Naval Recruit Training Centre/Combat Training School - SLNS Pandukabaya

== Sri Lanka Air Force ==
The Sri Lanka Air Force has numerous training establishments and units;

Training establishments

- Air Force Academy – SLAF China Bay
  - SLAF Junior Command & Staff College – SLAF China Bay
  - No. 1 Flying Training Wing – SLAF China Bay Pilot Navigators
    - No. 14 Squadron – SLAF China Bay
  - Combat Training School – SLAF China Bay
  - NCO Management School – SLAF China Bay
- Training Wing – SLAF Diyatalawa – Ground combat Recruit course
- Advanced & Specialized Trade Training School | A&STTS – SLAF Ekala. Aircraft Technician, Fixed wing and Rotary wing- Airframe & Powerplant, Aviation Electronics, Safety.
- Basic Trade Training School – SLAF Katunayake. Non-technical administrative, IT training and basic Technical staff
- Regimental Training Centre – SLAF Ampara Combat and EOD
- Gunner Training School – SLAF Palaly Instructors
