= P. A. Ediriweera =

Piyadasa Ariyasena Ediriweera
- Born: October 1915; Ahangama, Sri Lanka
- Died: 1985
- Occupations: Travel agent, journalist, entrepreneur

Piyadasa Ariyasena Ediriweera (1915–1985) was a Sri Lankan travel agent, journalist and entrepreneur. Ediriweera Is credited as establishing Sri Lanka's first travel agency.

== Journalism ==
Ediriweera was born in Ahangama, Sri Lanka in October 1915. He left school to work as a 'cub' reporter in the 'Daily News' as provincial correspondent in Ahangama and later joined The Times of Ceylon as a journalist in the Colombo office working his way up to being a war correspondent and making influential friends and contacts in the international press and in particular at The New York Times. His subsequent success is attributed to publicity stemming from a cocktail party held to receive him by his American war correspondent friends at the Waldorf Astoria hotel, to which members of the American travel industry were invited. Ediriweera is reputed to have generated interest through his contacts at The New York Times writing articles on Sri Lanka targeting the American reader, and an advertising campaign.

== Travel industry ==
Ediriweera formed the company Ceylon Tours in July 1946 with Justin Kotalawala (brother of Sir John Kotelawala) as Chairman, Ediriweera as Managing Director, with Directors DB Dhanapala (who worked with him at the Times group as a reporter), Rosaline Koch and D.P Abeywardena. His business interests expanded and diversified. In 1949, Ediriweera opened an office at the Queens Hotel in Kandy and operated vehicles in Colombo from the Colombo Swimming Club. In the latter part of that year, he leased a hotel in Anuradhapura called Grand Hotel and acquired the island resort at San Michelle in Bolgoda which belonged to Sir John Kotelawala who leased it to Ceylon Tours. He later bought and operated the Mount Lavinia Hotel (where parts of Bridge on the River Kwai was filmed), Grand Oriental Hotel (Taprobane Hotel) and the Times of Ceylon where he became chairman of the board.

== Film industry ==
Ediriweera visited Los Angeles in 1954 and met with executives of Universal Studios, United Artists and Horizon pictures who were persuaded to visit Ceylon to consider it a venue for film shoots. He also visited the United Kingdom, leading to the movie Outcast of the Islands (1951) directed by Carol Reed being shot on locations in Ceylon in 1951 (the first British film to be shot in Ceylon). This was followed by The Planter's Wife by Ken Annakin 1952, The Purple Plain in 1954 directed by Robert Parrish and starring Gregory Peck, Elephant Walk (1954) directed by William Dieterle, the Academy Award-winning film The Bridge on the River Kwai filmed in Sri Lanka in 1957 starring William Holden and Sir Alec Guinness, Never So Few (1959) directed by John Sturges, and Kommissar X (1966) directed by Rudolf Zehetgruber. Ediriweera is said to have accompanied the film's director David Lean to meet Prime Minister S. W. R. D. Bandaranaike to secure permission for the film to be shot in Sri Lanka.

His daughter Ranjini Suranimala (who married DB Suranimala son of his friend DB Dhanapala and youngest son Chandra Ediriweera acted in the film Wer stirbt schon gerne unter Palmen (1974).
