= Sujeewa Senarath Yapa =

Major General Sujeewa Senrath Yapa සුජීව සෙනරත් යාපා
- Born: 2 June 1968 (age 57)
- Allegiance: Sri Lankan
- Branch: Sri Lanka Army
- Service years: 1987 – present
- Rank: Major General
- Commands: Commandant, Sri Lanka Army Volunteer Force
- Awards: Rana Wickrama Padakkama; Rana Sura Padakkama
- Spouse: Nayani Samanthi

Major General D G S Senarath Yapa RWP, RSP, ndu was a Sri Lanka Army general. He is the incumbent Commandant of the National Defence College, Sri Lanka and former Deputy Chief of Staff of the Army. Before that he was the 49th Commandant of the Sri Lanka Army Volunteer Force. Prior to join SLVF, he served as the Commander of Security Forces (West) and (Jaffna).

== Early life and education ==
Yapa educated at Piliyandala Central College, Colombo District. After that he joined the Sri Lanka Army as an Officer Cadet on 16 March 1987 under the Intake 27. As an officer, he completed his Master of Science in management (Defence) from the Kotalawala Defence University, Sri Lanka and then again gained Master of Science in Strategic Military Studies from National Defence University of Beijing in China.

== Military career ==
Yapa served as General Officer Commanding (GOC) of 57 and 14 Infantry Divisions. He also served as the Colonel of the Regiment of Sri Lanka Army Special Forces. In early years, he was the brigade Commander of Special Forces Brigade and Brigadier General Staff of the Security Forces Headquarters. He was promoted to Major General on 2 June 2020. On 14 December 2022 he assumed the post of Deputy Chief of Staff (DCOS), 3rd most senior appointment of the Sri Lanka Army.

== Personal life ==
General Yapa happily married to Mrs. Nayani Samanthi and the couple is blessed with two sons. His eldest son is Gavesh Yapa who studied at Royal College, Colombo.
