= B. A. P. B. Balasuriya =

Sri Lankan politician

Balasuriya Arachchige Punchi Banda Balasuriya
- Constituency: Galigamuwa

Personal details
- Born: 15 September 1907
- Party: Sri Lanka Freedom Party
- Occupation: Politician
- Known for: Member of Parliament

Balasuriya Arachchige Punchi Banda Balasuriya (15 September 1907 - 19??) was a Sri Lankan politician. He was a member of Parliament of Sri Lanka from Galigamuwa representing the Sri Lanka Freedom Party.

He first contested from Galigamuwa in the March 1960 general election, and lost to Wimala Kannangara. He was able to win the July 1960 general election defeating Kannangara and was elected to parliament. He lost the 1965 general election to Kannangara and defeated Kannangara at the 1970 general election.
