= General Treasury Building =

- Former names: New Secretariat Building

General information
- Location: Fort, Colombo, Sri Lanka
- Completed: 1930
- Cost: Rs 450,000
- Client: Government of Sri Lanka

Design and construction
- Architect: Austin Woodeson

Website
- npd.treasury.gov.lk

The General Treasury Building (also known as the Treasury or the Treasury Building) is the building that houses the Treasury of Sri Lanka and the Ministry of Finance, Planning and Economic Development along with several of its departments. It was formerly known as the Secretariat Building therefore it is still officially called The Secretariat. It is situated in the Colombo fort precinct next to the old Parliament Building, which is now the Presidential Secretariat.

== Building ==
With the expansion of the Legislative Council of Ceylon, the need for a new building to house the council and the civil administration of Ceylon was suggested by Sir Henry McCallum. A proposal made by a committee to construct the new building for the Secretariat, Council Chamber and Government offices on reclaimed land at the northern end of Galle Face' was accepted by the Ceylon Government in 1920. The chief architect of the Public Works Department, Austin Woodeson, was responsible for the design of the building. The initial estimate of Rs 400,000 for the scheme was later revised by the Public Works Advisory Board to Rs 450,000, taking into account the extra expenses involved. The building was opened on 29 January 1930, by Governor Sir Herbert Stanley.

The new building was of two parts, the smaller but grander Council Chamber with a Neo-baroque façade, which faced the Indian Ocean to the west. The Secretariat, a larger however the more simple building compared to the Council Chamber situated to the east of it.

The Council Chamber was to house Legislative Council, however it was only for a year as the Legislative Council was replaced by the more powerful State Council of Ceylon in 1931. The Secretariat housed the civil administration of the colony, with the offices of the Colonial Secretary and the Treasurer along with their staff and several government departments. Effectively the two building became the centre of the government of the island for the next twenty years till Ceylon gained independence in 1949. For many years after independence the headquarters of the CID of the Police was based here on the fourth floor which gain much ill fame.

Following independence, new government ministries and departments were set up to carry out policy formulated by the Cabinet of Ministers. Many key departments were housed here including the Treasury and the Ministry of Finance. Soon many of the government ministries and departments moved out of the building to new buildings due their expansion. By the 1950s the building was known as the General Treasury and by the 1980s the building was completely occupied by the Ministry of Finance and its departments.

== Building extensions ==
This building is undergoing a process of extension. Construction project is handled (Consulted) by Consultancy Division of state Engineering Corporation of Sri Lanka.

== See also ==
- Old Parliament Building, Colombo
- Republic Building
