= Cathedral of Christ the Living Saviour =

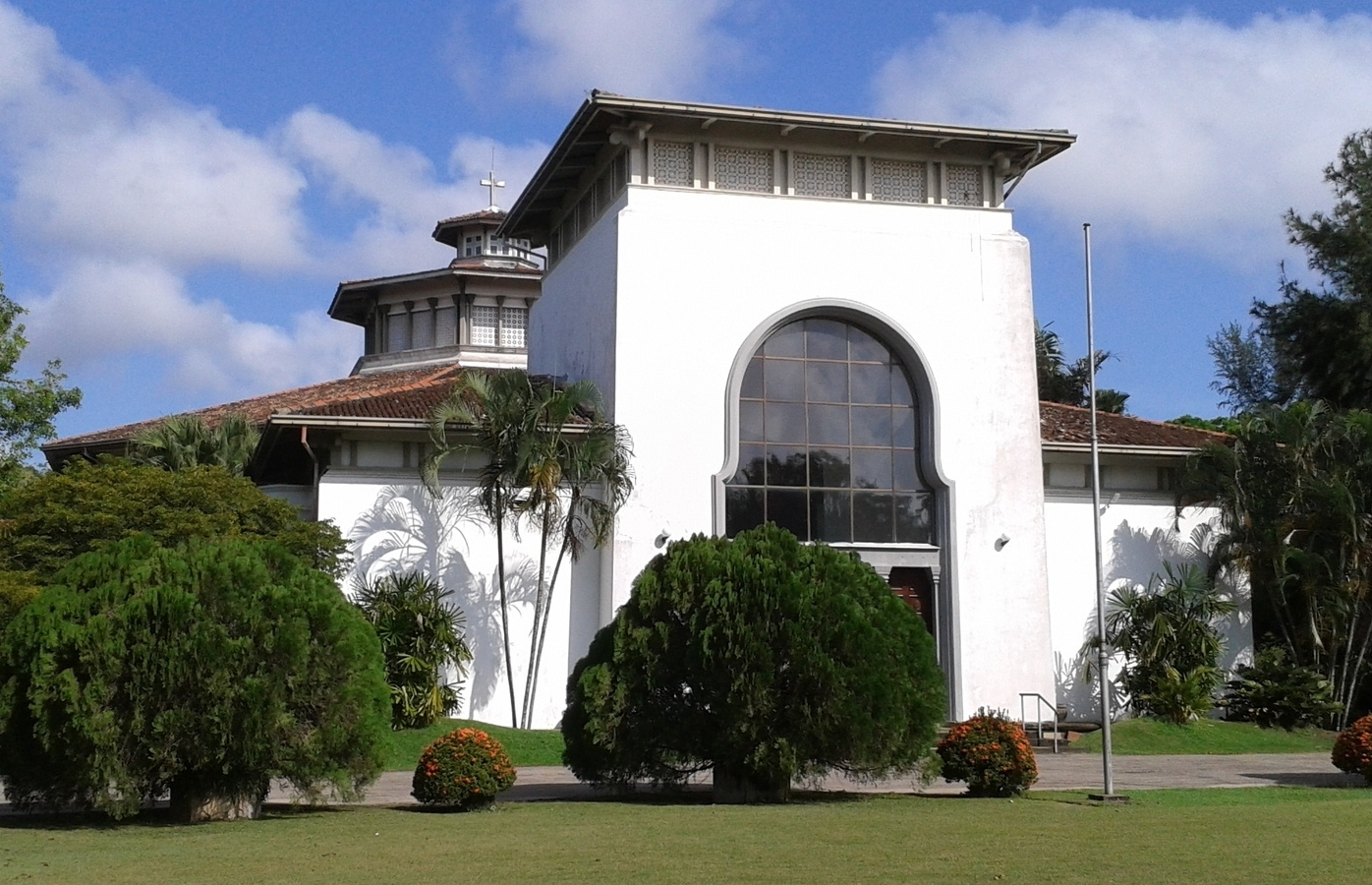

- Location within Colombo District

Religion
- Affiliation: Anglican, Church of Ceylon
- Year consecrated: 1973
- Status: Active

Location
- Location: Colombo, Sri Lanka
- Coordinates: 6.903619°N 79.873222°E

Architecture
- Architects: Tom Neville Wynne-Jones, P. H. Wilson Peiris
- Type: Church
- General contractor: U. N. Gunasekera
- Groundbreaking: 28 October 1968

Website
- www.cathedral.lk

The Cathedral of Christ the Living Saviour is located in Cinnamon Gardens (Colombo 07) a suburb of Colombo, Sri Lanka. It is the primary Anglican cathedral, affiliated to the Church of Ceylon.

The decision to build the Anglican cathedral in Colombo, to replace the old cathedral in Mutwal, was initiated by Bishop Harold de Soysa, the first Ceylonese Anglican Bishop of Colombo. It was designed by P. H. Wilson Peiris (architect of the Cathedral of Christ the King, Kurunegala) and the architect of the structure was Tom Neville Wynne-Jones CBE (architect of the Independence Memorial Hall). The construction was undertaken by the firm of U. N. Gunasekera.

The foundation stone for the cathedral was laid on 28 October 1968 by Bishop de Soysa, who died in 1971 before its completion. The construction was subsequently overseen by his successor, Bishop Cyril Abeynaike, whose ideas were incorporated into some of the church's features. The cathedral was consecrated on 7 November 1973 and has subsequently been used for all the Church of Ceylon's major religious ceremonies, including the consecration of all the bishops of Ceylon.

The cathedral is based on the traditional style of Sri Lanka architecture, in this case the hexagonal form of a Buddhist temple, using modern concrete technology. It is the seat of the Bishop of Colombo.

== See also ==
- Cathedral of Christ the King, Kurunegala
- Theological College of Lanka
