= Austin Woodeson =

British architect (1873–1935)

Austin Woodeson OBE, FIBA
- Born: 3 May 1873; Reading, Berkshire
- Died: 24 November 1935 (aged 62); Bournemouth, England
- Citizenship: British
- Education: University of Reading
- Occupation: Architect
- Title: Chief Architect of Ceylon
- Spouse: Clara Grace Tringham
- Parent(s): Thomas Henry Woodeson (father), Eliza née Pike (mother)

Austin Woodeson OBE, FRIBA (3 May 1873 - 24 November 1935) was a British architect, who served as the Chief Architect in Ceylon.

Austin Woodeson was born on 3 May 1873 in Reading, Berkshire, the son, and the fifth of six children, to Thomas Henry Woodeson (1838-1916) and his second wife Eliza née Pike (1857-1936). In 1892 he was articled to Cooper and Howell, after completing his apprenticeship he remained with the firm as an assistant for a number of months. Whilst at Cooper and Howell he attended classes at University of Reading Extension College. In August 1895 he took up a position as an architectural assistant at Davy and Salter, in Maidenhead, before moving to Glasgow as an assistant with Stark and Rowntree in 1896.

Woodeson emigrated to Ceylon in November 1898 to take on the role of chief architectural draughtsman at the Public Works Department.

In October 1905 in married Clara Grace Tringham in Southampton, Hampshire, England.

He passed the architectural qualifying examinations in October 1906 and was admitted to the Royal Institute of British Architects on 3 December that year and was elected as a fellow to the Institute in 1914. Woodeson served as the Secretary of the Engineering Association of Ceylon for twenty years, from 1912 to 1931.

As the Public Works Department in Ceylon expanded, his role was combined with that of the quantity surveyor to become chief architect. By 1925 Woodeson was supervising a large number of qualified architects, draughtsmen and quantity surveyors. In the same year he travelled to India, for a month, studying architectural styles in relation to a recent commission for Ceylon University. Three years later he spent some of his annual leave working in London on Sir Herbert Baker's plans for the new Queen's House, and in the following year he was sent again to India for two months in connection with the Government's housing and town planning schemes. His most notable work was designing the Parliament Building, which housed the State Council (1931-1947); the House of Representatives (1947-1972); the National State Assembly (1972-1978); the Parliament of Sri Lanka (1978-1982) and from September 1983 the Presidential Secretariat. He was also responsible for designing the General Treasury Building, formerly known as the Secretariat Building, which housed the council and the civil administration services of Ceylon. Both buildings were designed in Neo-Baroque architectural style, with highly modelled façades embodying a continuous double-height ionic order above a rusticated podium.

Woodeson established a number of evening classes in building construction, drawing and quantity surveying, and was himself a popular lecturer. From 1912 to 1931 he served as the honorary secretary of the Engineering Association of Ceylon. He was an active freemason, and was elected Deputy Grand Master in Ceylon in 1928 and District Grand Master in 1930.

Woodeson was awarded an OBE in 1932 for his services in Ceylon. He retired back to England and died at Bournemouth on 24 November 1935.

== Notable works ==
- Ceylon University College (1921–27)
- Old Parliament Building, Colombo (1929)
- General Treasury Building (1930)
