= Jaffna Clock Tower =

Coordinates: 9°39′47.50″N 80°00′48.00″E

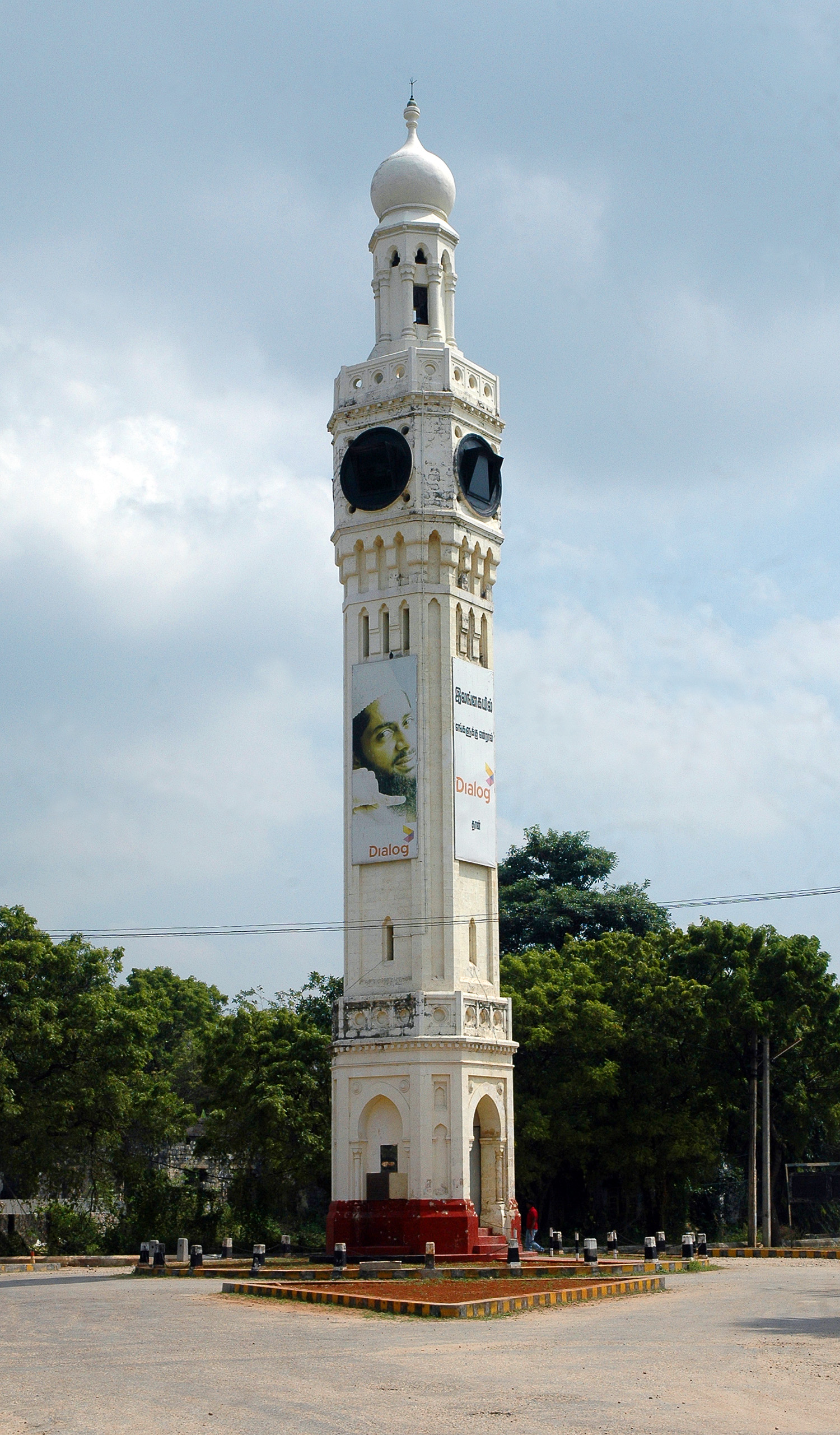
The clock tower in 2012.

Jaffna Clock Tower (Tamil: யாழ்ப்பாணம் மணிக்கூட்டுக் கோபுரம் Yāḻppāṇam Maṇikkūṭṭuk Kōpuram) is a clock tower in the city of Jaffna in northern Sri Lanka. It is one of the landmarks of the city. It was built to commemorate the visit of Albert Edward, Prince of Wales to Ceylon in 1875.

== History ==
When it was announced that the Prince of Wales would visit Ceylon in 1875 the Jaffna Prince of Wales Reception Committee was formed. They managed to raise more than Rs. 10,000 for the Jaffna Prince of Wales Reception Fund. The fund was used to purchase a silver casket and set of jewels which were presented to the Prince of Wales in Colombo on 1 December 1875. The balance of fund (Rs. 6,000) was to be used to build a permanent memorial of the Prince's visit. At a meeting held on 1 July 1880 at the Jaffna Kachcheri it was decided to use the fund to build a clock tower on Jaffna esplanade. A further Rs. 4,000 was raised from local contributions to build the tower. The tower was designed by government architect James Smither. The clock was donated by Governor James Longden. The clock bell is dated 1882.

The tower was badly damaged in the late 1980s by the civil war. When Charles, Prince of Wales visited Sri Lanka in 1998 he offered British assistance in restoring the tower. The British government donated Rs. 1 million. The renovated tower was re-opened by British High Commissioner Linda Duffield on 19 June 2002.
