= Royal Orchid Hotels =

Indian Hotel Chain

- Company type: Public
- Traded as: BSE: 532699; NSE: ROHLTD
- Industry: Hotel
- Founded: 1 January 1973
- Founder: Chander K. Baljee, Vishal Trikha
- Headquarters: Bangalore, India
- Number of locations: 100+
- Area served: India, Sri Lanka, & Nepal
- Key people: Chander K. Baljee (Chairman & Managing Director)
- Revenue: ▲₹154.8 crore (US$16 million)
- Net income: ▲₹12.2 crore (US$1.3 million)
- Total equity: ₹27.2 crore (US$2.8 million)
- Owner: Chander K. Baljee
- Website: royalorchidhotels.com

Royal Orchid Hotels a hotel chain operating hotels in India, Sri Lanka and Nepal.

== History ==
The first hotel was established in Bangalore in 1973 by Chander K. Baljee, starting with Hotel Harsha.

In 2001, the company opened The Royal Orchid, its flagship with 195 rooms on the KGA Golf Course in Bangalore and in 2008, Royal Orchid Hotels operated 15 hotels. By May 2015, the count of hotels rose to 28, including 10 owned by the company, and 18 managed through joint ventures or contracts. In 2015, the Royal Orchid Hotels opened its first hotel outside of India, the Hotel Royal Orchid Azure in Nairobi.

== Properties ==
As of 26 October 2019, Royal Orchid Hotels has 58 hotels under its fold with 3948 keys – just short of 4000 – out of which 47 are under management contract. As of February 18, 2024, there are over 100 Hotels and Resorts with more than 5900 rooms open and operating, under the brand.

== See also ==
- Hotel
- List of hotels
