= Justin Samarasekera =

Sri Lankan architect

- Born: 21 May 1916; Colombo Sri Lanka
- Died: 19 October 2003 (aged 87)
- Education: Nalanda College, Colombo
- Occupation: Architect
- Known for: Architecture

Justin Samarasekera (21 May 1916— 19 October 2003) was a Sri Lankan architect. He is considered to be one of the founding fathers of the architectural profession in Sri Lanka and a pioneer of architectural education in the country.

== Early life ==
Justin Samarasekera was born on 21 May 1916, in a small village on the coast, near Dondra, the son of a school teacher. He completed his secondary school education at Ananda College and then Nalanda College, Colombo. In 1938 he enrolled at the Sir J. J. College of Architecture in Bombay. During his time in India he became involved in the country's independence movement, which influenced his later contributions to Ceylon's national identity.

== Career ==
Upon his graduation in 1943 he returned to Ceylon where he joined the Public Works Department. In 1946 he travelled to London, to successfully pass the Royal Institute of British Architects' final examinations. He then worked for the architectural firm, Thomas Bennett and Son, in Holborn, a prominent firm in the UK New Town Movement. He returned to Sri Lanka and continued to work at the Public Works Department, where in 1948, under the leadership of Tom Neville Wynne-Jones, he and seven other architects including F. H. Billimoria, Shirley de Alwis, Oliver Weerasinghe, Homi Billimoria, and M. B. Morina, designed the Independence Memorial Hall. Samarasekera was appointed chief architect in 1956.

In 1963 Samarasekera established his own private practice, Justin Samarasekera Associates. He was a founding member of the Sri Lanka Association for the Advancement of Science (SLAAS) which was established in 1944, and was the first architect to be elected General President in 1976.

Samarasekera was a founding member of the Ceylon Institute of Architects, which was established in 1957, and was actively involved in the establishment of architectural courses, at the Institute of Practical Technology in Katubedda, which later became the University of Moratuwa. He served as the president of Sri Lanka Institute of Architects in 1961 and the president of the National Academy of Sciences of Sri Lanka, between 1985 and 1986.

In 1982 he was made an Honorary Fellow of the SLIA and in the same year the University of Moratuwa conferred an honorary doctorate upon him, a Doctor of Science, honoris causa, the first architect to receive such an honour. In 1996 he received the SLIA Gold Medal, the Association's highest honour.

In 1996 following his retirement Samarasekera re-commenced painting, with exhibitions of his works being held in 1997 and 1998.

== Personal life ==
Samarasekera married, living on Model Farm Road, near the Royal Colombo Golf Club, where they raised three children. His wife died in 1991 and he subsequently remarried, moving to an apartment complex he built in Isipathana Mawatha in 1996, following the death of his second wife. In 1997 he was diagnosed with Parkinson's disease, which gradually restricted his physical activities, eventually dying on 19 October 2003, at age 87.

== Notable works ==
- Independence Memorial Hall, Colombo (1948)
- Sri Lanka Association for the Advancement of Science, Colombo (1959)
- Institute of Practical Technology, Katubedde, Moratuwa (1959)
- Kalutara Chaitya, Kalutara (1965)
- Indian Pavilion and Ceylon Paper Corporation Pavilion, International Industrial Exhibition, Colombo (1965)
- Atchchuveli Industrial Estate, Jaffna (1970)
- SLFP Party Headquarters, Colombo (1970)
- University of Kelaniya Library, Kelaniya (1973)
- Kollupitiya Market, Colombo (1976)
- Yala Safari (1976)
- Wornel's Reef Hotel, Beruwala (1974)
- University of Ceylon Physics and Chemistry buildings (1979)
- Co-operative Wholesale Establishment, Colombo (1981)
- Sripada National College of Education, Kotagala (1982–89)
