= Hulftsdorp court complex =

The Hulftsdorp court complex is a large courthouse complex in Colombo, Sri Lanka. The complex is on a short hill known as Hulftsdorp from which it derives its name. With origins dating back to the Dutch colonial era, the complex was built during the British colonial era. Two Special High Courts, eight High Courts, three Commercial High Courts, and eight District Courts are housed in the complex in a collection of colonial buildings.
