= Independence Memorial Hall =

Sri Lankan national monument

Coordinates: 6°54′16.5″N 79°52′02.2″E

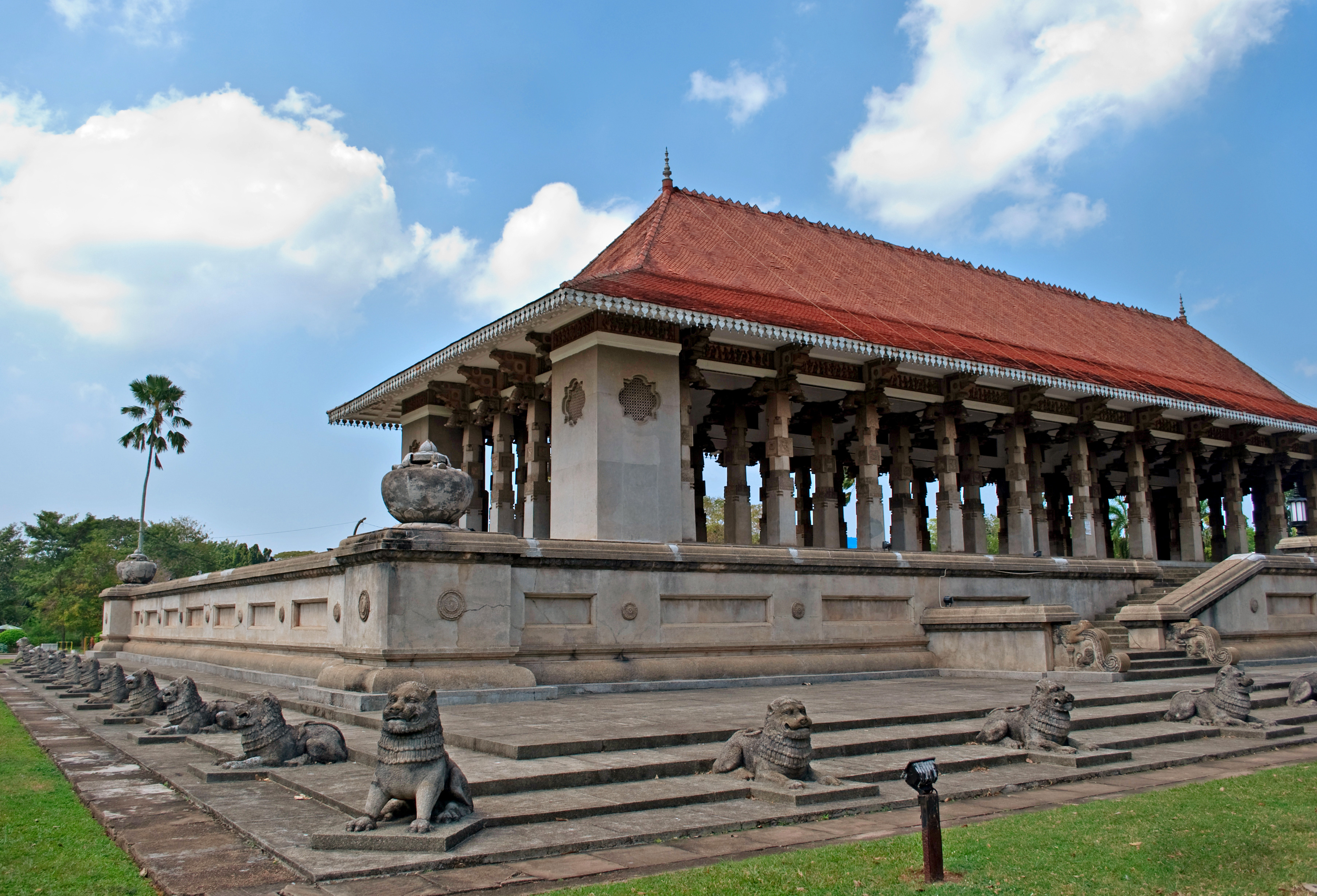

- Location within Greater Colombo
- Alternative names: Independence Commemoration Hall

General information
- Location: Cinnamon Gardens, Colombo, Sri Lanka
- Construction started: 4 February 1949
- Completed: 1953
- Owner: Ministry of Cultural Affairs

Technical details
- Floor area: 930 m^{2} (10,000 sq ft)

Design and construction
- Architect: Tom Neville Wynne-Jones
- Other designers: Shirley D’Alwis

Independence Memorial Hall (also known as Independence Commemoration Hall) is a national monument in Sri Lanka built for the commemoration of the independence of Sri Lanka from British rule, with the restoration of full governing responsibility to a Ceylonese-elected legislature on 4 February 1948. It is located in Independence Square (formerly Torrington Square) in the Cinnamon Gardens, Colombo. It also houses the Independence Memorial Museum.

The monument was built at the location where the formal ceremony marking the start of self-rule, with the opening of the first parliament by Prince Henry, Duke of Gloucester occurred at a special podium on 4 February 1948.

Located at the head of the monument is the statue of the first prime minister of the country Rt. Hon. Don Stephen Senanayake "The Father of the Nation". Most of the annual National Independence Day celebrations have been held here. Apart from being a monument, it served as the ceremonial assembly hall for the Senate of Ceylon and the House of Representatives of Ceylon until the parliament was moved to the new parliament complex. Currently it is the venue for religious events and annual national day celebrations.

== Design ==
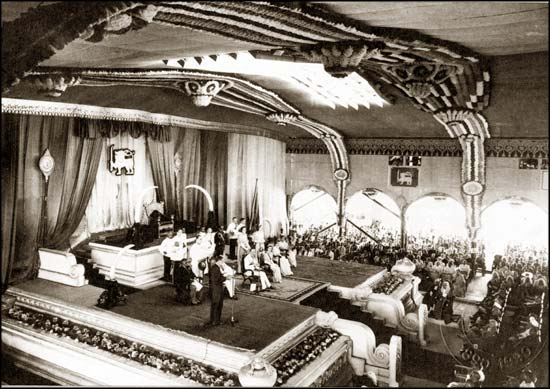
The formal ceremony marking the start of self-rule, with the opening of the first parliament at the special podium at the present Independence Square, Colombo.

The building was designed by a group of eight notable architects led by Tom Neville Wynne-Jones CBE, and included F. H. Billimoria, Shirley de Alwis, Oliver Weerasinghe, Homi Billimoria, Justin Samarasekera, and M. B. Morina. The design of the building is based on the Magul Maduwa (Celebration Hall), the Royal audience hall of the Kingdom of Kandy the last native kingdom of the island, where on 5 March 1815 the Kandyan Convention was signed between the British and the Kandyian Chieftains (Radalas) ending the Kingdom of Kandy.

== In popular culture ==
The Memorial Hall was featured as a pit stop on several versions of The Amazing Race, including:

- The 4th season of The Amazing Race Asia
- The 1st season of The Amazing Race Australia
- The second season of the Israeli edition of The Amazing Race.
- The the flagship American series on its 39th season.

== Events ==
- Independence Celebrations
- Oaths ceremony of President Maithripala Sirisena
- Funeral of Ven. Madihe Pannaseeha Thero
- Funeral of Ven. Gangodawila Soma Thero
- Funeral of Ven. Daranagama Kusaladhamma Thero
- Funeral of Premasiri Khemadasa
- Funeral of President Ranasinghe Premadasa
- Funeral of Gamini Dissanayake
- Funeral of Lakshman Kadirgamar
- Funeral of W. D. Amaradeva
- Funeral of Vijaya Kumaratunga
- Funeral of Lester James Peries
- Funeral of Malini Fonseka
- Funeral of Latha Walpola

== See also ==
- Kandyan Convention
- Sri Lankan independence movement
- Cathedral of Christ the Living Saviour
