= Mumtaz Mahal, Colombo =

Mumtaz Mahal

General information
- Location: Kollupitiya, Colombo, Sri Lanka
- Current tenants: National Defence College
- Construction started: 1928
- Completed: 1929
- Owner: Government of Sri Lanka

Design and construction
- Architect: Homi Billimoria

The Mumtaz Mahal is the former official residence of the Speaker of the Parliament of Sri Lanka, which now houses the National Defence College, Sri Lanka, located in Kollupitiya, a suburb of Colombo. Built in 1929, it was purchased in 1948 to serve as the official residence of the Speaker of the House of Representatives and served in that capacity till a new residence was built in 2000 in close proximity to the New Parliament Complex in Sri Jayawardenapura-Kotte. Since then the house has been used by various government entities.

== History ==
The house was built in 1928, with work commencing in 1927 following the demolition of the French styled villa, St Margaret's, which was located on a plot of land, situated in Kollupitiya along Galle Road and stretching to the Indian Ocean. St Margaret's was built for Mohamed Ali Mohamed Hussain by his father Mohamed Ali. However, Mohamed Hussain tore down villa and commissioned the architect, Homi Billimoria, to build a larger Italian renaissance styled house. Count de Mauny was commissioned to design the gardens and furniture for the house. On the suggestion of Herbert Sri Nissanka, Mohamed Hussain named the new house after his youngest daughter, Mumtaz. A few years after moving into the house, Hussain faced bankruptcy due to the Great Depression and rented the house to the French Consul. Following the fall of the Vichy government in 1943, the French Consul left the island and the house was requisitioned for use by Vice Admiral Sir Geoffrey Layton, Commander-in-Chief, Ceylon who lived in it till the end of the war.

With Ceylon gaining independence, the house was purchased by the Government of Ceylon to be used as the official residence of the Speaker of the House of Representatives, Sir Francis Molamure. It served in this capacity till 2001, when the Speaker moved to a newly built residence in close proximity to the new parliamentary complex at Sri Jayawardenepura Kotte. The house was subsequently used for the Constitutional Council and the Fiscal Ombudsman, until it was taken over by the Buddhist and Pali University. Since then it has become heavy dilapidated, with most of its original fittings and furniture either lost or destroyed. In 2021, it underwent a major restoration by the Ministry of Defence as it was prepared to house the National Defence College.

== See also ==
- Srawasthi Mandiraya
