= Old Parliament Building, Colombo =

Presidential Secretariat office building

Old Parliament Building
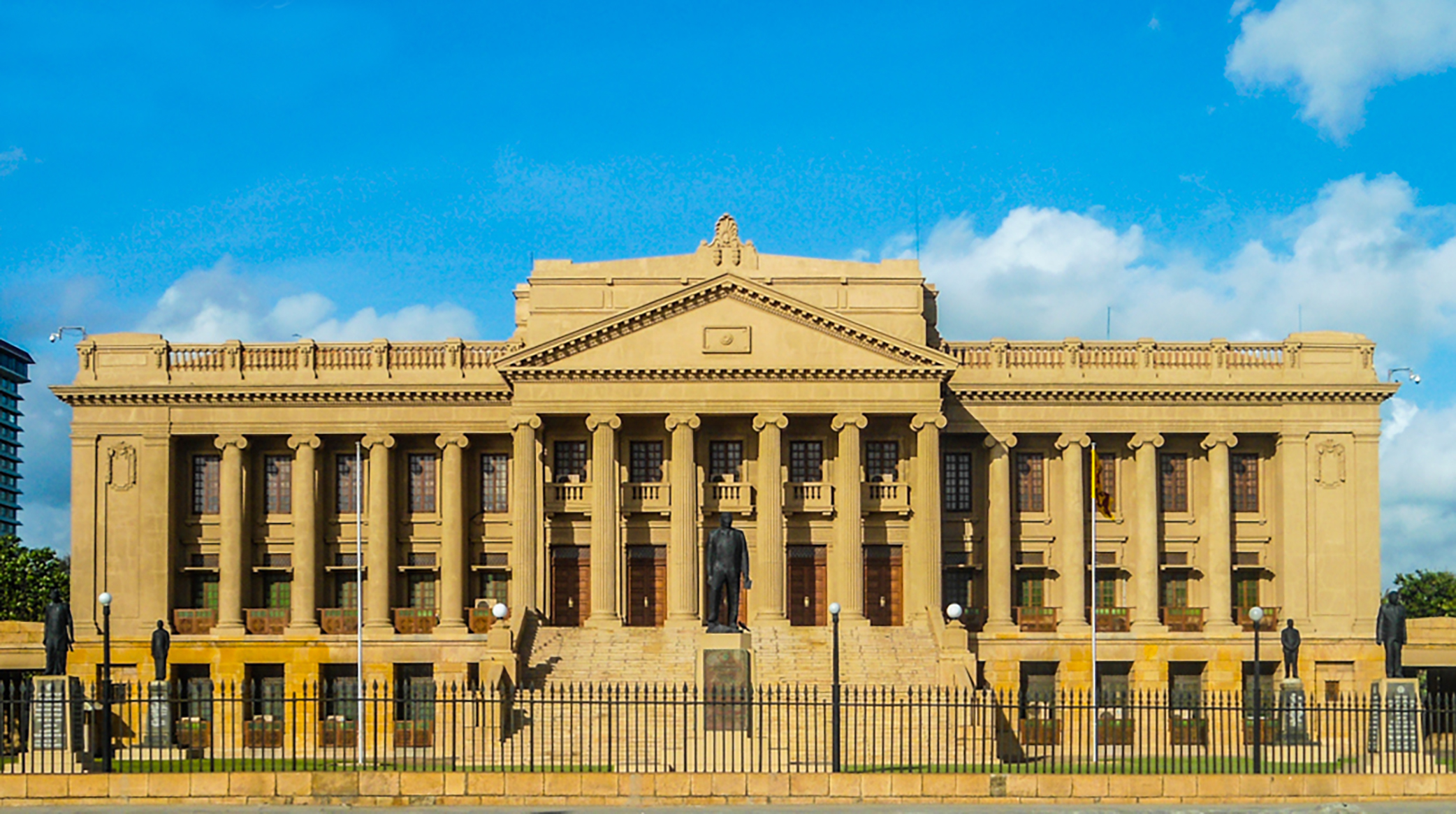
- The Old Parliament Building in Colombo

- Location within Central Colombo

General information
- Architectural style: Neoclassicism
- Location: Fort, Colombo, Sri Lanka
- Coordinates: 6°55′52″N 79°50′35″E
- Completed: 1930
- Inaugurated: 29 January 1930; 96 years ago
- Cost: Rs 450,000
- Client: Office of the President
- Owner: Government of Sri Lanka

Design and construction
- Architect: Austin Woodeson
- Architecture firm: Public Works Department of Ceylon
- Main contractor: Walker Sons and Company

Website
- presidentsoffice.gov.lk

The Old Parliament Building, is the building that houses the Presidential Secretariat of Sri Lanka. Situated in the Colombo fort area facing the sea, it is in close proximity to the President's House, Colombo and adjacent to the General Treasury Building. The building housed the island's legislature for 53 years until the new parliamentary complex was opened at Sri Jayawardenepura in 1983.

== Building ==
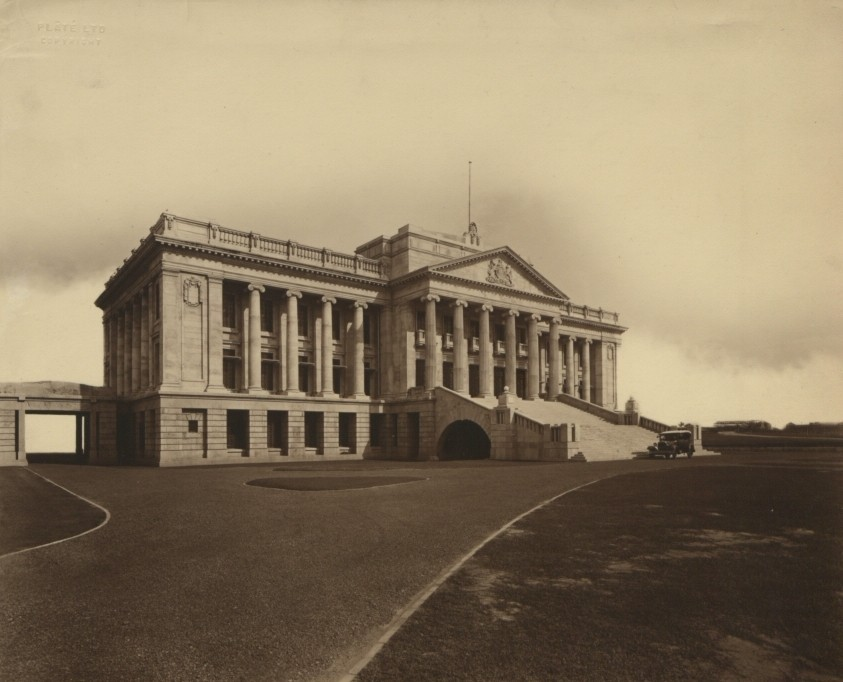
The building as the State Council Building of Ceylon

The Neoclassicist-style building was built during the British colonial era to house the Legislative Council of Ceylon, and was the idea of Sir Henry McCallum. This was subsequently included in a proposal made by a committee to construct the new building for the Secretariat, Council Chamber and Government offices on reclaimed land at the northern end of Galle Face, which was approved by the Government in 1920. Austin Woodeson, chief architect of the Public Works Department of Ceylon, was tasked with the building's design; his initial estimate of 400,000 rupees for the scheme was later revised by the Public Works Advisory Board to 450,000.

The building was opened on 29 January 1930 by Governor Sir Herbert Stanley; a year later it was taken over by the State Council of Ceylon for its use, who were tenants of the building until 1947, when the House of Representatives was formed with the onset of self-rule. Following the adoption of a republican constitution in 1972, the National State Assembly convened in the building until 1977, when it was renamed the Parliament of Sri Lanka.

Parliament then moved out to a purpose-built complex in Sri Jayawardenapura Kotte in 1983; the building then became home to the Presidential Secretariat, housing the Office of the President. The building and the former Council Chamber (formally known as the Parliament Chamber) is a venue for many state events, often the letters of credence of incoming ambassadors and high commissioners are accepted by the President here.

The Royal Coat of Arms of the United Kingdom adorned the top of the building face until 1948, when it was replaced by the arms of the Dominion of Ceylon and was once again replaced in 1972 with the arms of the Democratic Socialist Republic of Sri Lanka.

== Statues ==
The front garden of the Old Parliament Building is host to several bronze statues of eminent statesmen, that include:

- D. S. Senanayake – First Prime Minister of Ceylon
- Dudley Senanayake – Second Prime Minister of Ceylon
- General Sir John Kotalawela – Third Prime Minister of Ceylon
- Sir Ponnambalam Ramanathan – Attorney General and first native elected member of a Legislative Council in the British Empire
