= Marcelline Jayakody =

Sri Lankan priest and writer (1902–1998)

Fr. Marcelline Jayakody
- Born: 3 June 1902; Sri Lanka
- Died: 15 January 1998 (aged 95)
- Other names: Malpale upan Pansale Piyathuma, Modern Gonsalvez
- Education: Roman Catholic Boys' School in Madampe, St. Joseph's College, St. Aloysius Seminary, Borella
- Occupations: Catholic priest, musician, lyricist, author, journalist and patriot

Fr. Marcelline Jayakody (Sinhala: මර්සලින් ජයකොඩි පියතුමා) (3 June 1902 ─ January 15, 1998) was a Sri Lankan Catholic priest, musician, lyricist, author, journalist and an exponent of indigenous culture. He belonged to the Catholic Religious Congregation of the Missionary Oblates of Mary Immaculate (OMI). He is attributed with the epithet 'පන්සලේ පියතුමා' (Pansale Piyathuma - Priest in the Temple). Ven. Dr. Ittapane Dhammalankara Thera authored a book on Jayakody's life, මල් පැලේ උපන් පන්සලේ පියතුමා, (Malpale Upan Pansale Piyathuma), which is recorded as the first book in the world by a Buddhist prelate on a Catholic priest.

== Passion Play of Duwa ==
Jayakody served as the head priest in Duwa, Sri Lanka in 1939. Duwa is the Passion Play Village of Sri Lanka. Originally, the play used traditional puppets as actors. Jayakody wrote the original script for a passion play, influenced by Fr. Jacome Gonsalves, and composed new hymns to the traditional "Pasan". He next introduced live male and female actors instead of puppets. Eventually there were over 250 live actors taking the place of puppets in his adaptation of Dorothy L. Sayers's The Man Born to Be King (Dukprathi Prasangaya in Sinhala). The Duwa passion play was considered as the greatest passion show in Asia at that time.

== Awards ==
- In 1979, his poetry book Muthu (Pearls) won the National State Literary Award (the first Catholic priest to have won a state award).
- In 1982, he was honoured with the title "Kalasuri" by the state, and "Kithu Nandana Pranamaya" by the Catholic Church for his contributions to arts and culture for over six decades.
- In 1983, he won the Ramon Magsaysay Award, considered the Asian Nobel Prize, (along with US$20,000, a medal and a citation) in Manila, Philippines in the category of Journalism, Literature, and the Creative Communication Arts (JLCCA) as appeared on the List of Ramon Magsaysay Award winners.
