= D. B. Dhanapala =

Sri Lankan journalist

Diyogu Badathuruge Dhanapala
- Born: 1905; Tissamaharama, Sri Lanka
- Died: 18 March 1971 (aged 65–66)
- Education: Mahinda College, Galle; Allahabad University
- Occupations: Journalist; biographer; art historian

Diyogu Badathuruge Dhanapala (1905–1971) was a pioneering Sri Lankan journalist and writer.

== Early life and career ==
Dhanapala was born in Tissamaharama and educated at Mahinda College, Galle and Allahabad University in India. After an early career as a writer and a journalist at the Ceylon Daily News, where he wrote under the pen name Janus, in the famous "Blue Page" of the Ceylon Daily News. His pen portraits of prominent people of Sri Lanka became a hallmark of his contributions and made his writing style unique in the country at that time.

After a while his disagreements with the Lake House resulted in him leaving and going on to teaching as the principal of Dharmaloka Vidyalaya Kelaniya. He returned to journalism to found the Lankadeepa, the Sinhala daily which exists to this day as the Sinhala-language daily with the largest circulation. He served as the Chief Editor.

Lankadeepa was unique at the time because it was original journalism in Sinhala. At that time, the Dinamina, which was the only other Sinhala daily newspaper, was a translation of the English-language Ceylon Daily News. Lankadeepa had its own reporters, and was the first to give its reporters bylines in the stories they reported. It devised a special Sinhala font, and created a linotype for itself. It had its own photographers and created special pages for cinema, literature at the same time creating the first ever Sinhala cartoon strip, Neela.

A note in the back cover of the new edition of Among Those Present, D. B. Dhanapala's most famous book, says although Dhanapala's Sinhala writing was neither prolific nor unique, he attained an almost cult status for his writing in the Daily News.

He was also the founder of the Dawasa Group of Newspapers published by M.D. Gunasena & Company under the name and style of Independent Newspapers of Ceylon Limited challenging the supremacy of Lake House during the waning years of the Times of Ceylon.

Dhanapala's pen portraits were of a mix of people ranging from Anagarika Dharmapala to D.S. and Dudley Senanayake, G.P. Malalalasekara, Oliver Goonetilleke, Herbert Hulugalle, John Kotelawela, Nicholas Attygalle, L.H. Mettananda, S.W.R.D. Bandaranaike and many more.

All this gave the Lankadeepa a special identity, which it retains to this day. Most of the noteworthy journalists in Sinhala were products of the Lankapeepa. This in essence led to D.B.Dhanapala being called "the doyen of Sinhala journalism".

== Journalism ==
Dhanapala started in journalism working at the Ceylon Daily News newspaper published by the Lake House Group. He later moved on to take up a position as principal of Dharmaloak Vidyala in Kelaniya. From there he founded the Sinhala newspaper Lankadipa in 1948 – a newspaper which has the largest readership today, and commenced a long-standing friendship with fellow reporter PA Ediriweera. The newspaper began as a six-column tabloid in 1947 and was a standard seven-column daily newspaper by 1949. His ability to influence political thinking in the Sinhala-speaking population is believed to have caused concern among the politicians in power in the incumbent government (from the United National Party) as he supported the campaign of S.W.R.D. Bandaranaike in the 1956 general election.

== Career as author ==
Dhanapala was a well-known biographer of leading personalities in Ceylon and is best known for his book on contemporary political figures Among those Present. His writing also includes work on Buddhist paintings from shrines and temples in Ceylon and the story of Sinhalese paintings.

== Travel industry ==
Together with P. A. Ediriweera he founded the travel firm Ceylon Tours.

== Honours ==
The Sri Lanka Press Institute commemorates his memory through the award of the D. B. Dhanapala Award for the Best Journalist.

=== Family ===
Dhanapala was married to Rathi Dhanapala teacher, poet, artist and author, and his family followed him into the media and creative fields. He was the father of filmmaker D. B. Nihalsinghe and photographer D. B. Suranimala, who married Ranjini Ediriweera (who acted in the film Wer stirbt schon gerne unter Palmen (1974) and later joined her brothers as a director of Ceylon Tours) the daughter of his friend and business partner PA Ediriweera.
