= Colombo South Teaching Hospital =

Hospital in Colombo, Sri Lanka

- Ministry of Health, Sri Lanka
- Sri Lanka Colombo District, Sri Lanka

Geography
- Location: B229 Hospital Rd, Kalubowila, Dehiwala, Sri Lanka
- Coordinates: 6°52′02″N 79°52′36″E

Organisation
- Care system: Public
- Type: Teaching
- Affiliated university: University of Sri Jayewardenepura

Services
- Emergency department: Yes
- Beds: 1,110

History
- Founded: July 2, 1960; 66 years ago

Links
- Website: www.csth.health.gov.lk
- Lists: Hospitals in Sri Lanka

The Colombo South Teaching Hospital (also called Kalubowila Hospital) is located in Kalubowila, Sri Lanka. The University of Sri Jayewardenepura uses the hospital for practical instruction. The hospital treated hundreds of dengue patients during an epidemic in 2014.
