= Kalubowila =

Kalubowila කළුබෝවිල களுபோவிலை
- Suburb
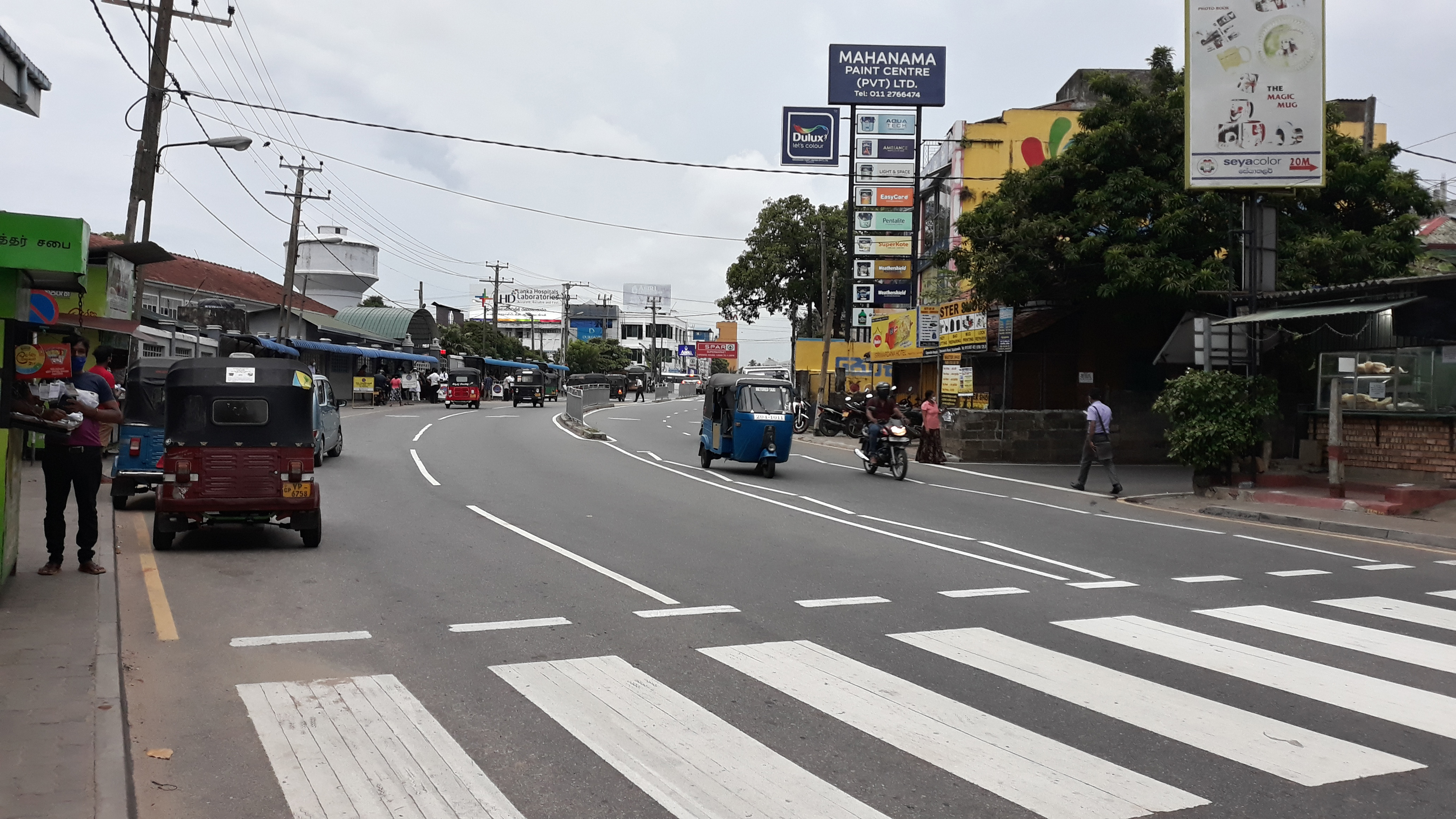
- Kalubowila town

- Location within Colombo District Location within Sri Lanka
- Coordinates: 6°53′0″N 79°53′0″E
- Country: Sri Lanka
- Province: Western Province
- District: Colombo District
- Time zone: UTC+5:30 (Sri Lanka Standard Time Zone)

Kalubowila is a suburb in Colombo, Sri Lanka. It is inside the administration boundary of the Dehiwala-Mount Lavinia Municipal Council. The Colombo South Teaching Hospital is located here.

Other places near Kalubowila include Kohuwala, Pamankada, Kalubowila East, Karagampitiya, Dehiwala.

It is located within the India Standard Time Zone (GMT+5:30)
