= Tintagel Colombo =

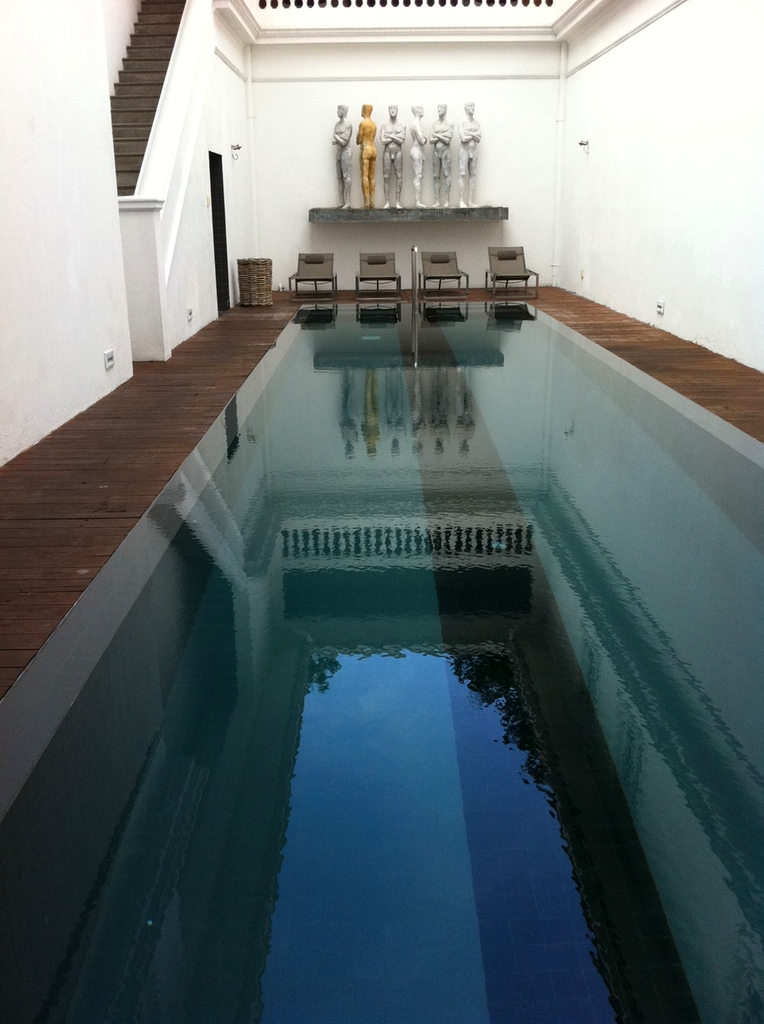
- The pool of the hotel

General information
- Architectural style: Colonial architecture
- Town or city: Colombo
- Country: Sri Lanka
- Coordinates: 6°54′53.8″N 79°52′11.71″E
- Current tenants: Paradise Road Hotels
- Opened: 2005
- Owner: Bandaranaike family

Design and construction
- Architect(s): Homi Billimoria

Other information
- Number of suites: 10
- Number of restaurants: 2

Website
- paradiseroadhotels.com/tintagel/

Tintagel Colombo is a boutique hotel in Colombo, Sri Lanka and the former town residence of the Bandaranaike family. The hotel is situated in Rosmead Place in Cinnamon Gardens.

== History ==
Homi Billimoria designed the Tintagel Colombo in 1929 for gynecologist Dr. Lucian de Zilwa. During World War II, Dr. de Zilwa was asked to vacate the house within seven days by the British military in order to house hundreds of soldiers. Having seen the military occupation had damaged the house, Dr. de Zilwa sold the house to Sir Solomon Dias Bandaranaike for Rs. 160,000. Later Sir Solomon's son, S. W. R. D. Bandaranaike occupied the house. S. W. R. D. became the prime minister in 1956 and was shot on the verandah of the house in 1959. His widow, Sirimavo Bandaranaike became the first female prime minister of the world in 1960. She continued to live in the house during her two other ministries, in 1970 and in 1994, up until her death in 2000.

== Boutique hotel ==
Shanth Fernando of Paradise Road Hotels took over the house in 2005 and converted it to a boutique hotel. Charles, Prince of Wales and Camilla, Duchess of Cornwall stayed at the hotel during their Sri Lankan visit in 2013. The hotel consists of 10 suites and two restaurants, the Courtyard and the Red Bar. The library of the house contains 6,000 books including 5,000 leather-bound volumes.

== See also ==
- List of hotels in Sri Lanka
