= Kumaratunga Munidasa =

Sri Lankan writer (1887–1944)

Kumarathunga Munidasa කුමාරතුංග මුනිදාස
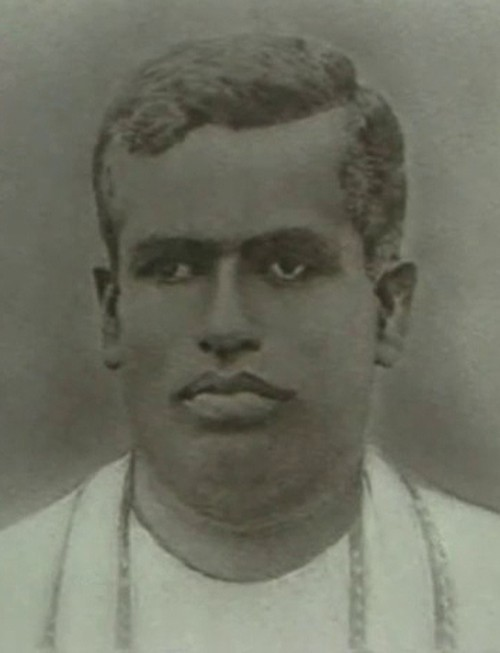
- Born: 25 July 1887; Idigasaara, Dickwella, Matara, Sri Lanka
- Died: 2 March 1944 (aged 56); Panadura, Sri Lanka
- Education: St.Thomas College,Matara
- Alma mater: Dikwella Buddhist School; St.Thomas' College, Matara; Wewurukannala Pirivena
- Occupations: Writer, poet, journalist
- Notable work: Hela Havula
- Spouse: Lilly Laviniya Peiris
- Children: 6
- Awards: 14

Kumaratunga Munidasa (Sinhala: කුමාරතුංග මුනිදාස; 25 July 1887 – 2 March 1944) was a pioneer Sri Lankan (Sinhalese) linguist, grammarian, commentator, and writer. He founded the Hela Havula movement, which sought to remove Sanskrit influences from the Sinhala language. Considered one of Sri Lanka's most historically significant scholars, he is remembered for his profound knowledge of the Sinhala language and its literary works.

== Personal life ==
The second youngest of twelve siblings, Kumarathunga Munidasa was born on 25 July 1887, in Idigasaara village, Dickwella, Matara, Sri Lanka. His mother was Palavinnage Dona Gimara Muthukumarana (or Dona Baba Nona Muthukumarana) and his father was Abious (or Abiyes) Kumaranatunga. His father, a physician who practiced indigenous medicine, kept Pali and Sanskrit manuscripts on Ayurveda medicine, Astrology, and Buddhism.

Munidasa originally attended Wewurukannala Pirivena to learn Pali and Sanskrit in order to become a Buddhist monk, but his family disapproved. He then switched to the government teachers' college in Colombo, graduating in 1907 after two years of training.

In 1921, Munidasa married Lilly Laviniya. Kumarathunga Munidasa died on 2 March 1944, at the age of 56.

== Career ==
His first appointment was as a government teacher in the Bilingual School of Bomiriya. He was later promoted to the position of principal of the Kadugannawa Bilingual School. After 11 years, he was promoted again to the position of inspector of schools. He remained in that role for four years.

His first book, Nikaya Sangraha Vivaranaya, was an analysis of a Scripture on the Buddhist Monastic Orders. Munidasa was a member of the Sinhala Maha Sabha of the Swabhasha movement, which started as a protest against the English-educated elites. In the following years, he made several poetry and short stories such as Udaya, Hath Pana, Heen Seraya, Magul Kema and Kiyawana Nuwana.

Munidasa spoke of language, nation, and the country as a Triple Gem, linking these entities to the Buddhist concept of refuge. To pursue these sources of refuge, he founded the Hela Havula, which consisted of people who shared his views on Sinhala language and literary interest. Members of the group often engaged in debates and discussion of recommended literature. It was the starting point for many Sri Lankan scholars and artists and the organization.

Munidasa revived the Lakminipahana newspaper and started the Subasa and Helio magazines to teach and promote the correct use of Sinhala.

== Novels written by Munidasa Kumaratunga ==
- Hathpana
- Heenseraya
- Kiyawana Nuwana
- Magul Keema

== Poetry written by Munidasa Kumaratunga ==
- Kriya Wiwaranaya
- Kumara Gee
- Kumara Rodaya
- NelawillaPiya Samara
- Virith Vekiya
- Vyakarana Vivaranaya
