= Homi Billimoria =

- Born: Homi Framjee Billimoria; 23 May 1901; Colombo, Ceylon
- Died: June 1956 (aged 55); Colombo
- Education: University of Liverpool
- Occupation: Architect
- Known for: Architecture

Homi Framjee Billimoria OBE, (23 May 1901 - June 1956) was a Ceylonese architect of Parsee origin. He was the first Ceylonese to graduate from Liverpool University and be elected a fellow of the Royal Institute of British Architects.

Homi Framjee Billimoria was born on 23 May 1901 in Colombo, Ceylon, the second of three children and the oldest son of Framjee and Dinbai Billimoria (1877-1945). Billimoria married Munnie Karanjia (1912-?).

In 1938 Billimoria joined the Government service as the country's first town planner. He served as the chief architect of the Public Works Department from 1953 to 1956. In the 1948 Birthday Honours he was appointed a Member of the Order of the British Empire while serving as the deputy chief architect, in 1953 he was conferred with a Coronation Medal and in the 1954 Birthday Honours, he received an Officer (Civil Division) Order of the British Empire. Billimoria was a founding member of the Ceylon Institute of Architects (CIA) and was later elected as a fellow of the Institute. In 1938 Billimoria joined the Government service as the country's first town planner. He served as the chief architect of the Public Works Department from 1953 to 1956. In the 1948 Birthday Honours he was appointed a Member of the Order of the British Empire while serving as the deputy chief architect, in 1953 he was conferred with a Coronation Medal and in the 1954 Birthday Honours, he received an Officer (Civil Division) Order of the British Empire. Billimoria was a founding member of the Ceylon Institute of Architects (CIA) and was later elected as a fellow of the Institute.

== Notable works ==
- Mumtaz Mahal, Colombo (1928)
- Tintagel Colombo (1929)
- Independence Memorial Hall, Colombo (1948)
- Kandy Masonic Temple (1951)
- Young Men's Buddhist Association building, Colombo (1955)
- Navroz Baug (Fire Temple), Colombo.
