= Hulftsdorp =

Hulftsdorp අලුත්කඩේ (Alutkaḍē) புதுக்கடை (Putukkaṭai)
- Suburb
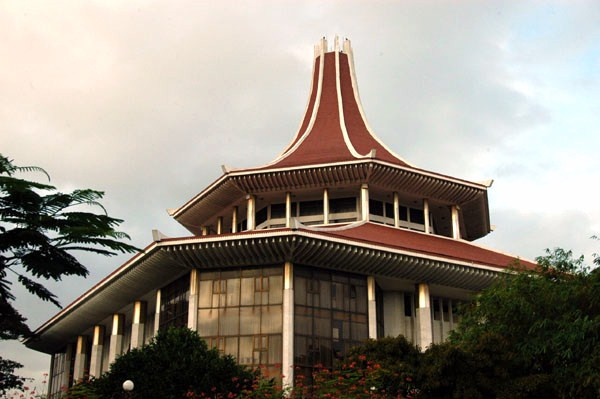
- The Supreme Court Complex in Hulftsdorp

- Location in Central Colombo
- Coordinates: 6°56′33″N 79°51′30″E
- Country: Sri Lanka
- Province: Western Province
- District: Colombo District
- Time zone: UTC+5:30 (Sri Lanka Standard Time Zone)
- Postal Code: 01200

Hulftsdorp (also written, incorrectly as Hultsdorf ) is a suburb in Colombo, Sri Lanka. It is part of the postal area known as Colombo 12. It has been known historically as Hulffsdorp, Hulfsdorp, Hulftsdorp, Hulsdorp, Hulstsdorp and Hülffsdorf.

== History ==
The name of the suburb Hulftsdorp is a commemoration of General Gerard Pieterszoon Hulft, the Dutch East India Company's Director of India and commander in chief of the company's forces in Ceylon (Sri Lanka) and on the Coast of India. Its name in Dutch translates to "Hulft's Town". He was killed while besieging Colombo. The hill on which he had his headquarters was named 'Hulft's Dorp' during the Dutch occupation.

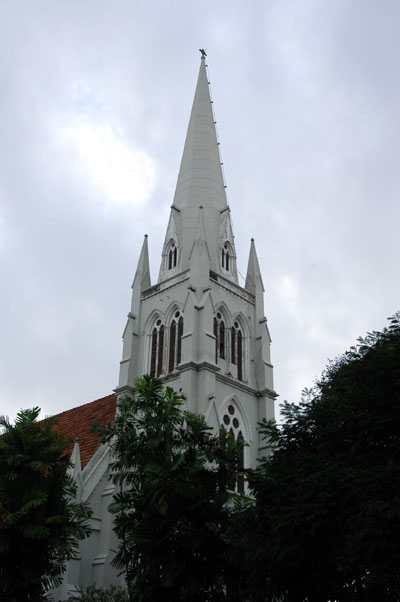
The colonial era All Saints Church in Dam Street, Hultsdorf

== Court Complex ==
Hulftsdorp is regarded as the centre of legal activity in Colombo being the location of the Supreme Court of Sri Lanka, Court of Appeal of Sri Lanka, Hulftsdorp court complex and Sri Lanka Law College.
