= List of Sri Lankan musicians =

This is a list of notable Sri Lankan musicians (music artists and bands) from all genres.

The musicians and bands are listed according to the alphabetical order by first name.

== A ==
- Ajith Bandara
- Allen Ratnayake
- Amarasiri Peiris
- Ananda Samarakone
- Annesley Malewana
- Anton Jones
- Anil Mihiripenna
- Athma Liyanage

== B ==
- Bathiya Jaykody

== C ==
- Ceylon Manohar
- C.T. Fernando
- Chandrasena Hettiarachchi
- Chandralekha Perera
- Chitral Somapala
- Clarence Wijewardane
- Cliff Foenander

== D ==
- Desmond de Silva
- Dinesh Subasinghe
- Dhanith Sri
- Dushyanth Weeraman

== E ==
- Eddie Jayamanne
- Edward Jayakody

== F ==
- Freddie Silva

== G ==
- Gunadasa Kapuge
- Mohammed Gauss
- The Gypsies

== H ==
- H. R. Jothipala
- Henry Caldera

== I ==
- Iraj Weeraratne
- Indrachapa Liyanage
- Indrani Karunarathne

== J ==
- J. P. Chandrababu
- J. A. Milton Perera
- Jackson Anthony
- Jagath Wickramasinghe

== K ==
- Kamal Addararachchi
- Karunarathna Divulgane
- Kasun Kalhara
- Keerthi Pasquel
- Kumar Navaratnam
- Keith Potger

== L ==
- Lahiru Perera
- Lakshman Joseph De Saram
- Latha Walpola
- La Bambas
- Lionel Ranwala

== M ==
- Mariazelle Goonetilleke
- Mathangi Arulpragasam
- Mercy Edirisinghe
- Mignonne Fernando
- Milton Mallawarachchi
- Mohideen Baig
- The Moonstones
- M. S. Fernando

== N ==
- Nuwandhika Senarathne
- Namal Udugama
- Nanda Malini
- Narada Disasekara
- Neela Wickramasinghe
- Nimal Mendis
- Nihal Nelson
- Nalin Jayawardena
- Nirosha Virajini

== P ==
- Pandith Amaradeva
- Paranoid Earthling
- Paul Fernando
- Premasiri Khemadasa
- Priya Suriyasena
- Prince Udaya Priyantha

== R ==
- R. Muttusamy
- Ravi Kesavaram
- Rohan de Saram
- Rookantha Gunathilake
- Rukmani Devi
- Rukshan Perera
- Rohana Weerasinghe
- Ranidu Lankage

== S ==
- Sadiris Master
- Saheli Rochana Gamage
- Sanath Nandasiri
- Santhush Weeraman
- Shihan Mihiranga
- Sisira Senaratne
- Som Wardner
- Stanley Peiris
- Stigmata
- Sunflowers
- Sunil Edirisinghe
- Sujatha Aththanayaka
- Sunil Perera
- Sunil Santha
- Sahan Ranwala

== T ==
- T. M. Jayaratne
- Tanya Ekanayaka
- Tharanga Goonetilleke

== U ==
- Umaria Sinhawansa
- Upali Kannangara

== V ==
- Victor Ratnayake
- Vijaya Kumaranatunga
- Vivienne de Silva Boralessa

== W ==
- W. D. Amaradeva

== Y ==
- Yohani
- Yolande Bavan
