= 2017 in Sri Lanka =

- Decades: 1990s; 2000s; 2010s; 2020s
- See also: Other events of 2017; Timeline of Sri Lankan history

The following lists notable events that occurred and which took place during 2017 in Sri Lanka.

== Incumbents ==
- President – Maithripala Sirisena
- Prime Minister – Ranil Wickremesinghe
- Chief Justice – K. Sripavan

=== Governors ===
- Central Province – Niluka Ekanayake
- Eastern Province – Austin Fernando (until 1 July); Rohitha Bogollagama (starting 4 July)
- North Central Province – P. B. Dissanayake
- Northern Province – Reginald Cooray
- North Western Province – Amara Piyaseeli Ratnayake
- Sabaragamuwa Province – Marshal Perera
- Southern Province – Hemakumara Nanayakkara
- Uva Province – M. P. Jayasinghe
- Western Province – K. C. Logeswaran

=== Chief Ministers ===
- Central Province – Sarath Ekanayake
- Eastern Province – Ahamed Nazeer Zainulabdeen (until 30 September); vacant thereafter (starting 30 September)
- North Central Province – Peshala Jayarathne (until 1 October); vacant (starting 1 October)
- Northern Province – C. V. Vigneswaran
- North Western Province – Dharmasiri Dassanayake
- Sabaragamuwa Province – Maheepala Herath (until 26 September); vacant (starting 26 September)
- Southern Province – Shan Wijayalal De Silva
- Uva Province – Chamara Sampath Dassanayake
- Western Province – Isura Devapriya

== Holidays ==
Below is a list of bank holidays, public holidays and full moon Poya Days in Sri Lanka for the year 2017.

- 12 January – Duruthu Full Moon Poya Day
- 14 January – Tamil Thai Pongal Day
- 4 February – National Day
- 10 February – Navam Full Moon Poya Day
- 24 February – Mahasivarathri Day
- 12 March – Madin Full Moon Poya Day
- 10 April – Bak Full Moon Poya Day
- 13 April – Day prior to Sinhala & Tamil
- 14 April – Sinhala & Tamil New Year Day
- 14 April – Good Friday
- 1 May
  - Labour Day
  - May Day
- 10 May – Vesak Full Moon Poya Day
- 11 May – Day Following Vesak Full Moon
- 8 June – Poson Full Moon Poya Day
- 26 June – Id-Ul-Fitr (Ramazan Festival Day)
- 8 July – Esala Full Moon Poya Day
- 7 August – Nikini Full Moon Poya Day
- 1 September – Id-Ul-Alha (Hadji Festival Day)
- 5 September – Binara Full Moon Poya Day
- 5 October – Vap Full Moon Poya Day
- 18 October – Deepavali Festival Day
- 3 November – Ill Full Moon Poya Day
- 1 December – Milad-Un-Nabi (Holy Prophet's Birthday)
- 3 December – Unduvap Full Moon Poya Day
- 25 December – Christmas Day

== Events by month ==
=== January ===
- 2 January
  - Former Deputy Minister Sarath Kumara Gunaratna has been arrested by the Criminal Investigation Department for alleged misappropriation of funds of the Negombo lagoon development project.
  - Jaliya Wickramasuriya, who was the Former Sri Lankan Ambassador to the United States, arrested on charges of misusing state funds.
- 5 January − Mudiyanselage Suranga Kumara alias ‘Rattaran’, an underworld gang, has been shot and killed by two unknown gunmen.
- 7 January − 21 persons including 3 police officers were injured and hospitalized as a result of the clashes which broke out during the protest in Hambantota. Meanwhile, 52 individuals were arrested on charges of violating court orders and damaging public property. On next day, 28 more individuals were arrested.
- 10 January
  - Ravi Karunanayake was named as the Finance Minister of the Year for Asia-Pacific by The Banker, a magazine of the British daily Financial Times.
  - Parliamentaria Wimal Weerawansa was arrested by the Police Financial Crimes Investigations Division who was accused of misusing several vehicles belonging to the presidential secretariat.
- 11 January − President Maithripala Sirisena inaugurated the filling of water to the Moragahakanda reservoir, the biggest multi-functional irrigation project in Sri Lanka.
- 13 January − Former Sri Lankan district judge Geethani Wijesinghe Widanelage swore as new Resident Magistrate of Fiji.
- 18 January − Disaster management officials stated that about 600,000 people have been hit by the drought in nearly 13 of the 25 districts, making it the worst drought since 2006.
- 31 January − Astrologer Vijitha Rohana Wijemuni was arrested by The Criminal Investigations Department for allegedly misleading the public by making false predictions.

=== February ===
- 5 February − Chamara Sandaruwan alias ‘Kudu Roshan’ was hacked to death by an unidentified group of people in Wanathamulla.
- 10 February − Sri Lanka opened its first hybrid power plant using wind, solar and diesel located on a small island off the Jaffna, that generate 60 MW of electricity.
- 14 February − For significant contributions in reforms in economy, education and human rights in Sri Lanka, Prime Minister Ranil Wickremesinghe conferred an honorary doctorate from Deakin University in Australia.
- 21 February
  - International cricketer Niroshan Dickwella was suspended for two limited-over matches after his accumulated demerit points reached five within a 24-month period.
  - Ministry of Crab and Nihonbashi ranked 29th & 49th at Asia’s 50 Best Restaurants’ awards ceremony.

=== March ===
- 1 March
  - 82 heroes of the 1818 Uva-Wellassa Rebellion were declared as patriots at the ceremony named ‘Uththamaabhiwandana’.
  - Notorious drug trafficker during the late 90’s and early 2000’s, Muniyandi Vappu Balan a.k.a. “Thel Bala,” died in India.
- 2 March − Supreme Court Judge Priyasath Dep took oaths as the new Chief Justice as the 45th Chief Justice of Sri Lanka.
- 11 March
  - Sri Lanka Labour Party leader A. S. P. Liyanage was appointed as the Sri Lankan Ambassador to Qatar.
  - International cricketer Rangana Herath became the most successful left-arm spinner in test cricket history after reaching 366 wickets surpassing blackcap Daniel Vettori.
- 22 March − Major General Mahesh Senanayake was appointed as the chief of staff of the Sri Lankan Army.
- 30 March − Ashoka Priyantha was appointed to fill parliamentarian seat left vacant by Renuka Herath.

== Deaths ==
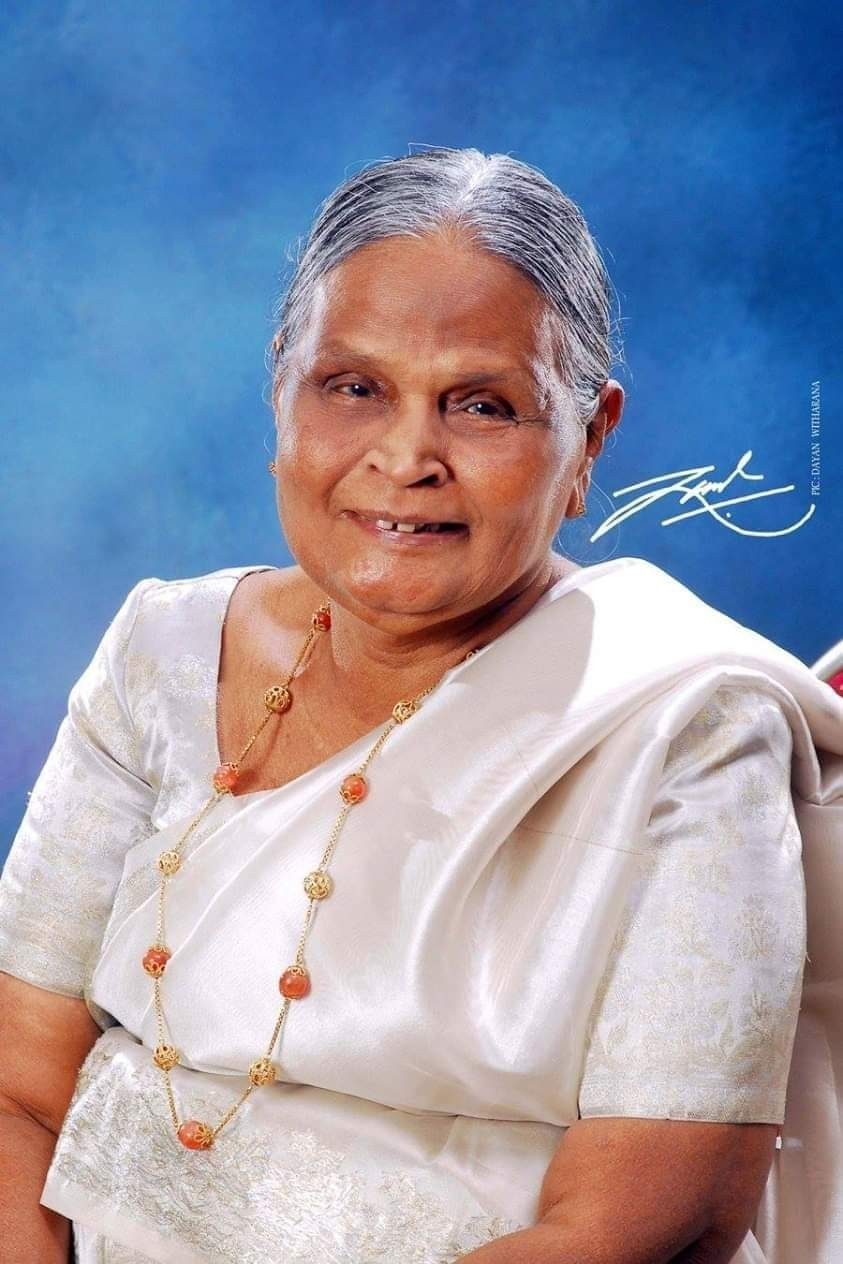
Vivienne de Silva Boralessa (b. 1930)

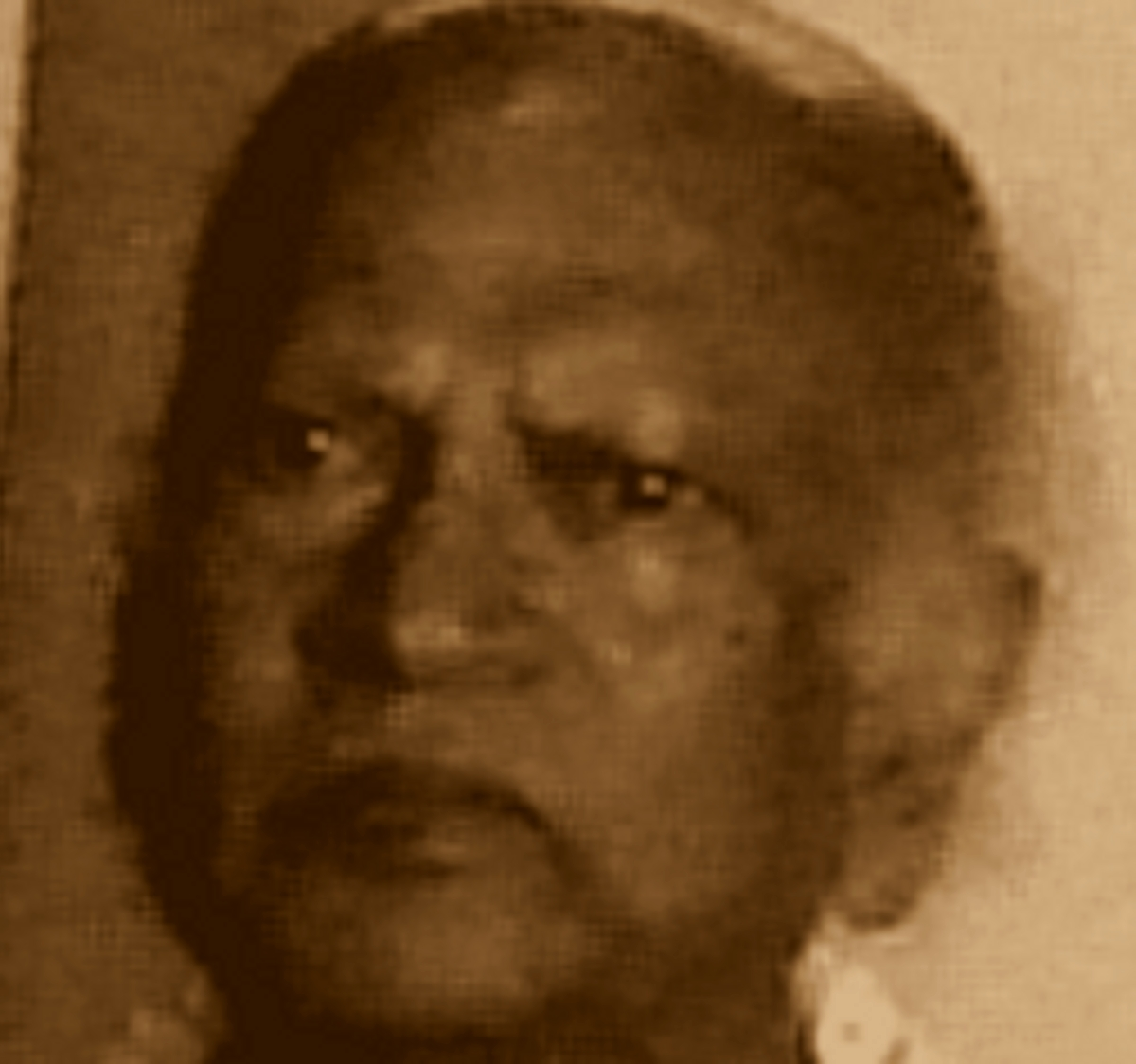
Siri Gunasinghe (b. 1925)

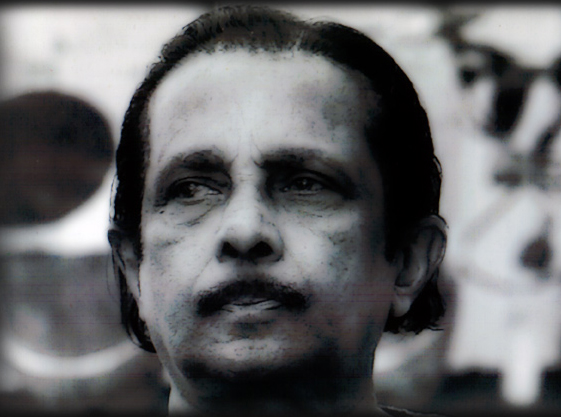
Anil Mihiripenna (b. 1933)

=== January ===
- 5 January – Christopher Weeramantry, 90 (Judge of Supreme Court of Sri Lanka [1967 to 1972], 72nd Judge of the International Court of Justice [1991 to 2000])
- 14 January
  - Deepal Silva, 50 (singer)
  - M. V. Balan, 75 (actor)
- 15 January – H. S. Perera, 68 (actor)
- 21 January – Roy Peiris, 54 (singer)

=== February ===
- 1 February – Baptist Fernando, 83 (actor)
- 10 February
  - Dr. Ariyadasa Pieris, 91 (journalist)
  - Wimal J. Sagara, 84 (singer)
- 13 February – S. A. Francis, (singer)
- 14 February – Boniface Fernando, 83 (actor)

=== March ===
- 10 March – Gamini S. Fernando
- 13 March – Renuka Herath, 71 (politician)
- 16 March – Pushpa Janet, (actress)
- 26 March – Anton Alwis, 73 (scriptwriter)
- 27 March – Shantha Kadiragonna

=== April ===
- 2 April – Vivienne de Silva Boralessa, 86 (songstress)
- 3 April – Davuldena Gnanissara Thero, 101 (Buddhist monk).
- 8 April – Vasantha Obeysekera, 79 (filmmaker).
- 14 April – Dr. Jagath Wijenayake, 60 (film producer)
- 15 April – T. Arjuna, 75 (filmmaker)

=== May ===
- 4 May – Satsorupavathy Nathan, 80 (radio personality).
- 5 May – Prabha Ranatunge, 81 (radio personality)
- 11 May – Premaranjith Tilakaratne, 80 (dramatist)
- 23 May – Daniel Muthumala (actor)
- 25 May – Siri Gunasinghe, 92 (academic)
- 29 May – Ananda Wedisinghe, 46 (motor cycle champion)
- 30 May – Sunil Mihindukula, 56 (journalist)

=== June ===
- 8 June – Prince Udaya Priyantha, 46 (singer)
- 11 June – Anil Mihiripenna, 83 (musician)
- 23 June – D. B. Kuruppu, (author)

=== July ===
- 11 July – Nihal Samarasinghe, (musician)
- 14 July – Dr. Thilokasundari Kariyawasam, 88 (educationist)
- 17 July – Somapala Rathnayake, 69 (musician)
- 20 July – Thilak Atapattu, (film producer)
- 26 July – Daya Kahawala, (author)

=== August ===
- 1 August – Dayawansa Karunamuni, (journalist)
- 16 August – Kumari Manel, 76 (actress)
- 20 August – Binoy Surendra, 76 (journalist)
- 24 August – Narawila Patrick, (author)

=== September ===
- 20 September
  - Sumith Bibile, 87 (actor)
  - Berty Galahitiyawa, 80 (announcer)
  - Dasun Nishan, 29 (actor)
- 23 September – Amaradasa Weerasinghe, (film critique)

=== October ===
- 20 October
  - D. A. Balasuriya, (actor)
  - Senaka Titus Anthony, (actor)

=== November ===
- 1 November – Suvineetha Fernando, (actress)
- 21 November – Dhammika P. Rathnayake, (announcer)
- 28 November – Ruwan Weerasekara, 51 (violinist)
- 30 November – Newton Gunasekara, (writer)
