= Udugama (surname) =

Udugama (Sinhala: උඩුගම, romanized: Udugama) is a Sinhalese surname. Notable people with the surname include:

- Udugama Sri Buddharakkitha Thero (1930–2015), Sri Lankan Buddhist monk, 20th mahanayaka of the Asgiriya chapter of Siyam Nikaya
- Namal Udugama (born 1967), Sri Lankan singer, composer and songwriter
- Richard Udugama (1911–1995), Sri Lankan army general, 5th commander of the army (1964–1966), politician and diplomat

== See also ==
- Deepika Udagama, Sri Lankan professor, academic, administrator and human rights activist
