= Mariazelle Goonetilleke =

Sri Lankan singer and musician (1958–2026)

Mariazelle Goonetilleke මරියසෙල් ගුණතිලක
- Born: 11 June 1958; Nugegoda, Colombo, Ceylon
- Died: 10 July 2026 (aged 68) Kalubowila, Colombo, Sri Lanka
- Genres: Rock; Pop; Sri Lankan music; Baila
- Occupation: Singer
- Instruments: Vocals; guitar; Piano; Keyboards
- Years active: 1960s–2026

Mariazelle Goonetilleke (Sinhala: මරියසෙල් ගුණතිලක; 11 June 1958 – 10 July 2026) was a Sri Lankan singer.

== Early years ==
Mariazelle Goonetilleke was born in Nugegoda located in Colombo, Sri Lanka. She began her music career at the age of seven. At the age of ten Mariazelle won the junior section of the Ceylon Observer All Island Talent Competition. This allowed her to join a pre-teen group of young musicians called the "Junior Rhythmiers", a popular Sri Lankan music group. The group became well known in the 1960s when they were featured on Radio Ceylon, the oldest radio station in South Asia. It "ruled the airwaves" during the 1950s and 1960s, so any exposure on Radio Ceylon was a huge boost to young artists on the island.

== Kandy Lamissi ==
According to the Sunday Observer of Colombo winning the Ceylon Observer Talent Contest "gave her more courage to play with bands like the Emeralds and the Midnight Mist". Recording "Kandy Lamissi" in 1977 was thought to be the turning point in her career. The song was an instant hit and Mariazelle came to be known by that name.

The success of "Kandy Lamissi" allowed her to perform not only in Sri Lanka but also in top hotels like Soaltee Oberoi in Kathmandu, Nepal. In the same year, she met with an accident in Nuwara Eliya and sustained serious injuries to her spine and collar bone. Helped by a classmate at the time, Christine Nadarajah, she claimed that her belief in God and community prayers saw her out from that dark period. After being released from hospital, Mariazelle had the privilege of being helped by Sri Lankan legends like: Clarence Wijewardene, the Emperor of Baila, M. S. Fernando, Stanley Peiris, Ajantha Ranasinghe, Chandral Fonseka and Sunil Perera/Piyal of the Gypsies. The compositions of Clarence and others allowed her to perform with a different style and their songs attracted music lovers. Ajantha's composition "Sihina Nelum Mal" was dedicated to her son, Teshan now studying in England.

== Music genre ==
Goonetilleke performed songs in a wide range of musical genres from western pop music to Sri Lankan Baila. She was well known as a leading Baila singer, performing her massive hit "Kandy Lamissi", all over the world. American Fulbright Scholar, Vasana Kelum de Mel, from the University of California, Los Angeles (UCLA) said, "Since I feel it is an essential issue to study the 'gender Baila' as well, the work of the female Baila singers like Mariazelle Goonetilleke and Corinne Almeida should also be appreciated."

She also collaborated with some of Sri Lanka's top musicians, among them: Sunil Perera of the Gypsies, M.S. Fernando, Dalreen Suby, Ronnie Leitch, Clarence Wijewardena, Desmond de Silva, Annesley Malewana, Damian Wickramatilleke, Maxi Rozairo, Shanelle Fernando, Umara Sinhawansa, Ashanthi De Alwis and Raj Seneviratne.

Goonetilleke spoke about her own struggles, and her rise to fame, in 2003 in an interview with the Sri Lankan Sunday Observer: "To have remained as I am in the music scene for 35 years, retaining and who and what I am is a most difficult thing. It's a feeling of elation because of the struggles I have faced to come out on top."

The Island newspaper in Colombo noted that,

"Kandy Lamissi"'s hitmaker Mariazelle Goonetilleke, is another local artiste who is very much in demand with Sri Lankans, domiciled abroad. She iss regularly seen in Melbourne, London, the Middle East, Canada and most foreign cities where Sri Lankan Associations exist. Her popularity abroad could be attributed to her versatility, she could handle most songs with ease – be it Sinhala, English, Hindi or Tamil.Mariazelle also has the ability to communicate with her audience in a friendly manner. And most people like her style.

== Christian faith ==
Goonetilleke became a committed Christian in 2009. According to The Island newspaper:"Goonetilleke is very much into religion and has taken God as her friend and saviour." She joined the People's Church in Colombo. Goonetilleke said: "I have sung all my life but now there is singing in my heart. The greatest song I sing is with God as my audience."

== Death ==
Goonetilleke died on 10 July 2026, at the age of 68, while receiving treatment for an illness at Colombo South Teaching Hospital in Kalubowila, Colombo.

== See also ==
- Music of Sri Lanka
- Radio Ceylon
- List of Sri Lankan musicians
