= Goonetilleke =

Goonetilleke (Sinhala: ගුණතිලක, romanized: Guṇatilaka) is a surname. Notable people with the surname include:

- H. A. I. Goonetileke (1922–2003), Sri Lankan academic
- Mariazelle Goonetilleke (1958–2026), Sri Lankan singer and musician
- Oliver Goonetilleke (1892–1978), Sri Lankan statesman
- Roshan Goonetileke (born 1956), Sri Lankan Air Force officer, commander of the air force, marshal of the air force, chief of defence staff and governor
- Tharanga Goonetilleke (fl. 1998), Sri Lankan soprano opera singer
- William Alfred Goone-Tilleke (1860–1918), Ceylonese-Siamese lawyer, entrepreneur and aristocrat. His descendants use their surname as "Guna Tilaka" and "Khunadilok" (Thai: คุณะดิลก)
