= Annapolis Brass Quintet =

The Annapolis Brass Quintet (ABQ) was a brass quintet founded by trumpet player David Cran and trombone player Robert Posten in 1971 as America's only full-time performing brass ensemble. During the course of its 22-year career, it played concerts in all fifty states and throughout Europe, the Orient, the Middle East, Central America and Canada.

== Members ==
The original members of the quintet were trumpeters Cran and Haldon "Butch" Johnson, trombonists Posten and John Driver, and horn player Rick Rightnour. Through 1993, 14 different musicians played as regular members, including future social scientist Arthur C. Brooks. At that time, the quintet disbanded, and played again only for a single concert in December 2000 in Annapolis, Maryland to honor the late jazz guitar legend Charlie Byrd. The final roster in 1993 and at the reunion concert were Cran, Posten, trumpeter Robert Suggs, trombonist Wayne Wells, and horn player Sharon Tiebert, the only female member in the Quintet's history.

== Notable performances ==
The Quintet is notable for its 1979 founding of the International Brass Quintet Festival in Baltimore, Maryland, which became recognized as a major forum for brass chamber music. A major highlight of the 1989 festival was the combined appearance of both the East Berlin and West Berlin Brass Quintets with the ABQ two months before the Berlin Wall toppled, a historic collaboration both musically and politically. The festival presented over 200 free public concerts and conducted workshops and seminars for students and professional brass players.

In 1985, the ABQ first performed with the Charlie Byrd Trio as Byrd and Brass. This unique and critically acclaimed blending of Latin, jazz and classical styles, with one of the world's premier jazz guitarists and his trio, led to a long collaboration including over 50 concerts throughout the United States, Christmas concerts in Annapolis, and two recordings, Byrd and Brass and Christmas with Byrd and Brass.

The Quintet made a strong commitment to expanding the repertoire for the medium and has a list of over seventy-five world premieres to its credit. Among the composers who have written works for the ensemble are Douglas Allanbrook, Michael Brown, Bruce Clausen, George Heussenstamm, Warren Kellerhouse, Jiří Laburda, Robert Hall Lewis, Allen Molineux, Lawrence Moss, Jiri Pauer, Karl Pilss, Walter Ross, Jerzy Sapieyevski, Elam Sprenkle, Robert Starer, George Walker and Robert Washburn. Of special interest are four compositions for quintet and orchestra composed for the ABQ and performed with the Baltimore Symphony, the Bavarian Radio Orchestra, the Stuttgart Philharmonic, the Wichita Symphony and the Dublin Radio Orchestra.

== Awards and recognition ==
United States Senator Barbara Mikulski congratulated the Annapolis Brass Quintet for the national record on the floor of the United States Senate on April 27, 1993, on the occasion of their final concert on April 25, and in recognition of the "contributions that the Annapolis Brass Quintet has made to brass chamber music. During its 22-year history, it has entertained people around the world and has positively influenced the development of its genre. Its members have achieved a truly high standard of artistic excellence and, together, represent what is best in American music."

== Discography ==
- Annapolis Brass Quintet (Crystal S-202)
- Quintessence (Crystal S-206)
- Annapolis Sounds (Richardson RRS-3)
- Encounter (Crystal S-207)
- The Spirit of Christmas Brassed (Richardson RRS-5)
- Music of Lawrence Moss: Symphonies (Orion ORS 79362)
- Invitation to the Sideshow (Crystal S-213)
- Music of Lawrence Moss: Flight (AmCam Recordings ACR 10301)
- The Age of Masques and Revels (Antigua DG91.5)
- Synthesis (Crystal S-219)
- New Music for Brass Quintet (Crystal S-235)
- Byrd and Brass (Concord Jazz, Inc.)
- Brass and Pipes (CRS)
- Christmas with Byrd and Brass (Antigua DG91.6)
- Reflections in Brass (Antigua 92)
