= Koththamalli =

Traditional Sri Lankan tea beverage

- Alternative names: Inchi kothamalli thanir, Inguru koththamalli, Coriander ginger tea
- Type: herbal tea
- Region or state: Sri Lanka
- Created by: Traditional
- Main ingredients: coriander seeds, ginger, water
- Variations: peppercorns, jaggery

Koththamalli (Sinhala: ඉඟුරු කොත්තමල්ලි තේ, Tamil: இஞ்சி கொத்தமல்லி தேநீர்) is an herbal tea beverage made by brewing coriander seeds and ginger. It is a traditional Sri Lankan home remedy for the common cold. Coriander and ginger have long been considered to have healing properties according to Ayurveda.

== In popular culture ==
In 2014, the Sri Lankan baila band, The Gypsies, released a song called "Kothtamalli".
