= Jerzy Sapieyevski =

Polish musician und composer (born 1945)

Jerzy Sapieyevski (born Jerzy Sapiejewski in Łódź, 20 March 1945), is a Polish-born pianist, composer and educator who settled in the United States in 1967.

== Career ==
Jerzy Sapieyevski was born in Łódź on 20 March 1945 and began music and engineering studies in his native Poland and settled in the USA 1967. A triple laureate of "Jazz nad Odrą" festivals/competitions (1964, 1965, and 1966) completed his music degree in the United States. In 1968 he received a scholarship from the Koussevitzky Foundation and participated as a pianist and composer at the Tanglewood Music Festival. In the following year he worked as a teaching assistant at the Catholic University of America and in 1971 he was a finalist at an international conducting competition in France. For a while he was married to Anne Lindbergh, some of whose poems he set to music in 1979.

Sapieyevski's music blends popular and classical styles and he has experimented with interactive works, in which electronic instruments were featured, including collaborations in live performances with painters – "Painted Music". In 2001, Sapieyevski foresaw a need for remote collaborations of multimedia artists/performers and music instructions. He designed Method of Multiple Computers Synchronization and Control for Guiding Spatially Dispersed Life Music/Multimedia Performances.

In 2005 the composer was decorated with the Knight Cross of the Order of Merit of the Republic of Poland. Sapieyevski's commissions and performances included the Kennedy Center and the Library of Congress commission and premiere of "Mazurka Variations" based on a Polish folk song.

His classical concert music scores are held in many libraries through the world. His score for the Washington Shakespeare Theatre's Production of "Richard III" was nominated for 1991 Helen Hayes Award.

In 2018, he established AmericanSongClub® serving talent development, social understanding and cultural interaction through workshops and performances of time-honored American music. From 2018 to 2021 Sapieyevski litigated (pro se) alleged infringement of his trademark (MusicHappens®) by Live Nation Entertainment, Inc.

Currently, he is professor emeritus at American University in Washington, DC.

== Compositions ==
- 1971: Lament for Igor Stravinsky
- 1973: Sinfonia Americana
- 1974: Concerto for viola and winds
- 1975: Morpheus: wind symphony
- 1976: Aria for alto saxophone and string ensemble
- 1977: Trio for an Italian journey : violin, cello, piano
- 1977: Summer overture: for orchestra
- 1978: Concerto for trumpet and orchestra ("Mercury")
- 1979: Love Songs (to poems by Anne Lindbergh) for soprano and piano
- 1980: Carolina concerto for flute and oboe
- 1981: Aria: for flute and strings or piano
- 1981: Games for Brass and Percussion
- 1981: Scherzo di Concerto for Wind Ensemble
- 1982: Toada in memory of Heitor Villa-Lobos: for clarinet and piano, commissioned by the Delmar Foundation for the Dumbarton Concerts
- 1984: Aesop suite: for brass quintet and narrator, commissioned by the Annapolis Brass Quintet
- 1986: Mazurka: variations for string quartet, commissioned by the Library of Congress
- 1989: Arioso for trumpet and woodwind quintet, commissioned by The International Trumpet Guild
- 1990: Carolina Concerto for flute and oboe
- 1990: Dance of the Planets, for orchestra and synthesizer
- 1992: Echoes of the spirit, for synthesizer and organ
- 1992: "Songs of the Rose", for synthesizer, chorus and African drum
- 1995: New Century Music, for electronic instruments
- 1996: Illuminata, commissioned by the Washington Ballet,
- 1997: Clio's Triumph, commissioned by the Washington Ballet
- 2004: Concerto, for solo piano and computer
- 2006: Painted Music, for orchestra and painters
