= Desmond de Silva =

Desmond de Silva may refer to:

- Desmond de Silva (singer)
- Desmond de Silva (barrister)
