= Malinee Peris =

Sri Lankan pianist

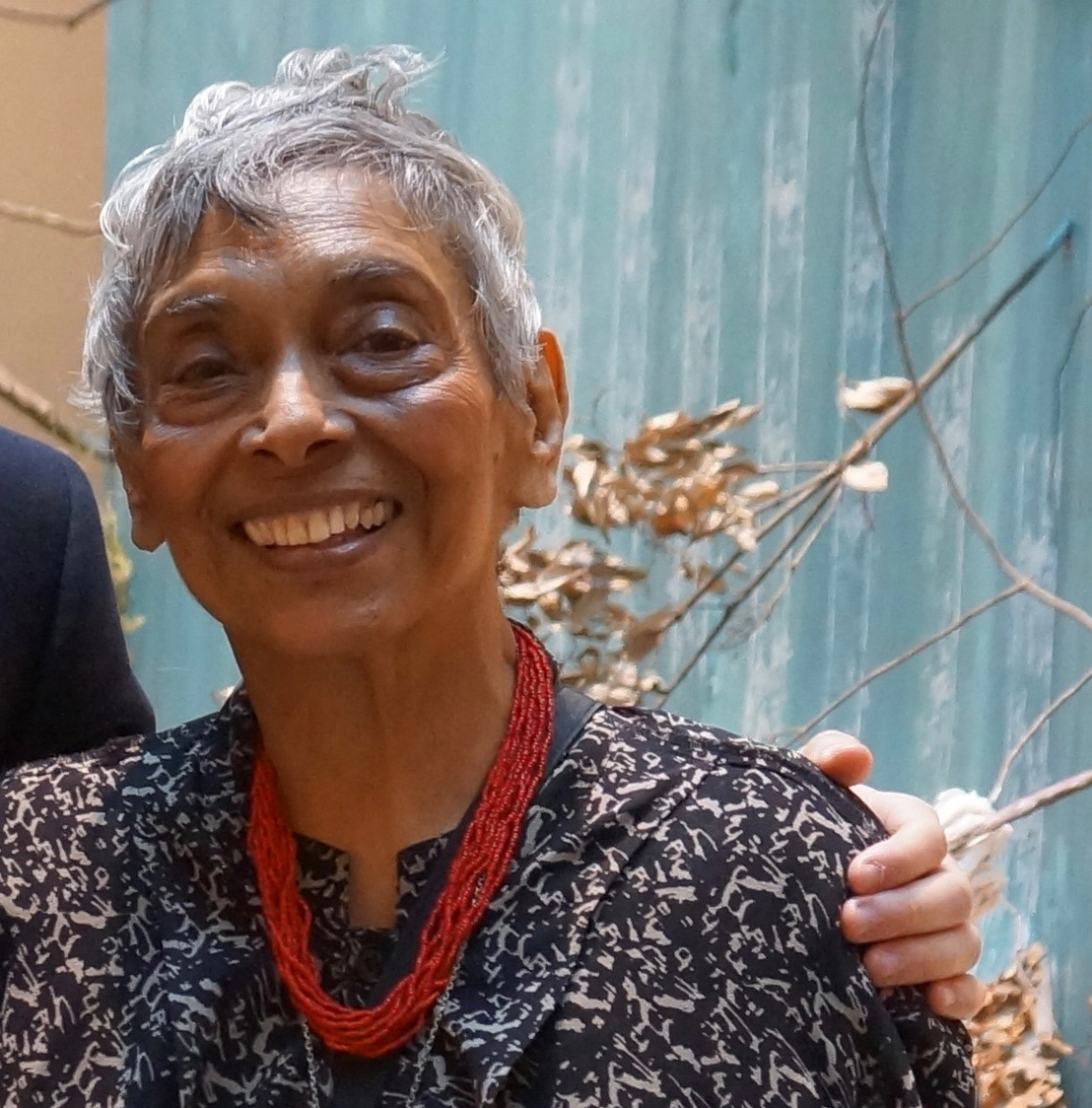
Professor Peris at the Corcoran School of Art

Malinee Peris (born 30 June 1929) is a Sri Lankan classical pianist.

== Biography and career ==
Peris was born Chitra Malinee Jayasinghe-Peris in Colombo, Ceylon (now Sri Lanka) on June 30, 1929 to Herbert Wakefield Bingham Peris and Frances Elfrida Jayasinghe Peris. Her father was Herbert W. B. Peris journalist and private secretary to Sir John Kotelawala prime minister of Sri Lanka, and Frances E. Peris a music teacher.

She attended Princess of Wales College Moratuwa and started piano lessons at the age of 4 with her mother. Her studies continued with Ms. Alix Cockburn who presented her at her first solo recital in Colombo at the age of 12.

She first started studying piano with her mother at 4 years of age. Peris also began violin studies at the age of 7 with Douglas Ferdinand and later with Eileen Prins. She continued the piano with Alix Cockburn and gave her first solo recital at age 12 in Colombo where she performed Johann Sebastian Bach, C.P. E. Bach, Beethoven, Dunhill, Mozart, and Couperin. Even at this age a music critic for the Ceylon Observer commented in a review, on “Her talent, technique, shading and genuine musicianship.”

In 1947, the examiner for The Associated Board of the Royal Schools of Music London recognized her musical talent. She was awarded a scholarship to the Royal College of Music London and at the age of seventeen set sail for London in December of that year to commence her European training. Lacking sufficient funds for living and travel expenses, The Times of Ceylon newspaper established a public fund to help her defray these costs and to enable her to pursue her musical studies in London. Ms. Peris gave her farewell recital at the Colombo Town Hall (3) on 20/11/47. The government of Ceylon followed by granting her another scholarship for her musical studies in Europe as well and she left for London accompanied by her father on October 26, 1947.

== Musical career ==
As an Associated Board scholar, Peris studied piano with Lance Dossor at the Royal College of Music. She continued violin with Isolde Menges at the Royal College, chamber music with Arthur Jacobs, and history and composition with Dr. Herbert Howells. At the same time she was introduced to Hungarian born virtuoso Louis Kentner, who became her mentor and teacher for the next 20 years. Kentner was brother-in-law to violinist Yehudi Menuhin. Their piano trio which included Gaspar Cassado as cellist rehearsed during summers in Gstaad Switzerland. Peris had the privilege to rehearse frequently with them in Gstaad. In the United States Peris has worked with Leon Fleisher, Earl Wilde, and Ilona Kabos. She was awarded The Hopkinson Silver Medal in 1951 from the Royal College of Music. Her first Wigmore Hall recital in 1951 was met with critical acclaim from the London Daily Express and the London Daily Telegraph. In 1955 she competed at the Chopin International Piano Competition in Warsaw, Poland where she won an Honorable Mention. She toured Poland that same year as well as many years that followed.

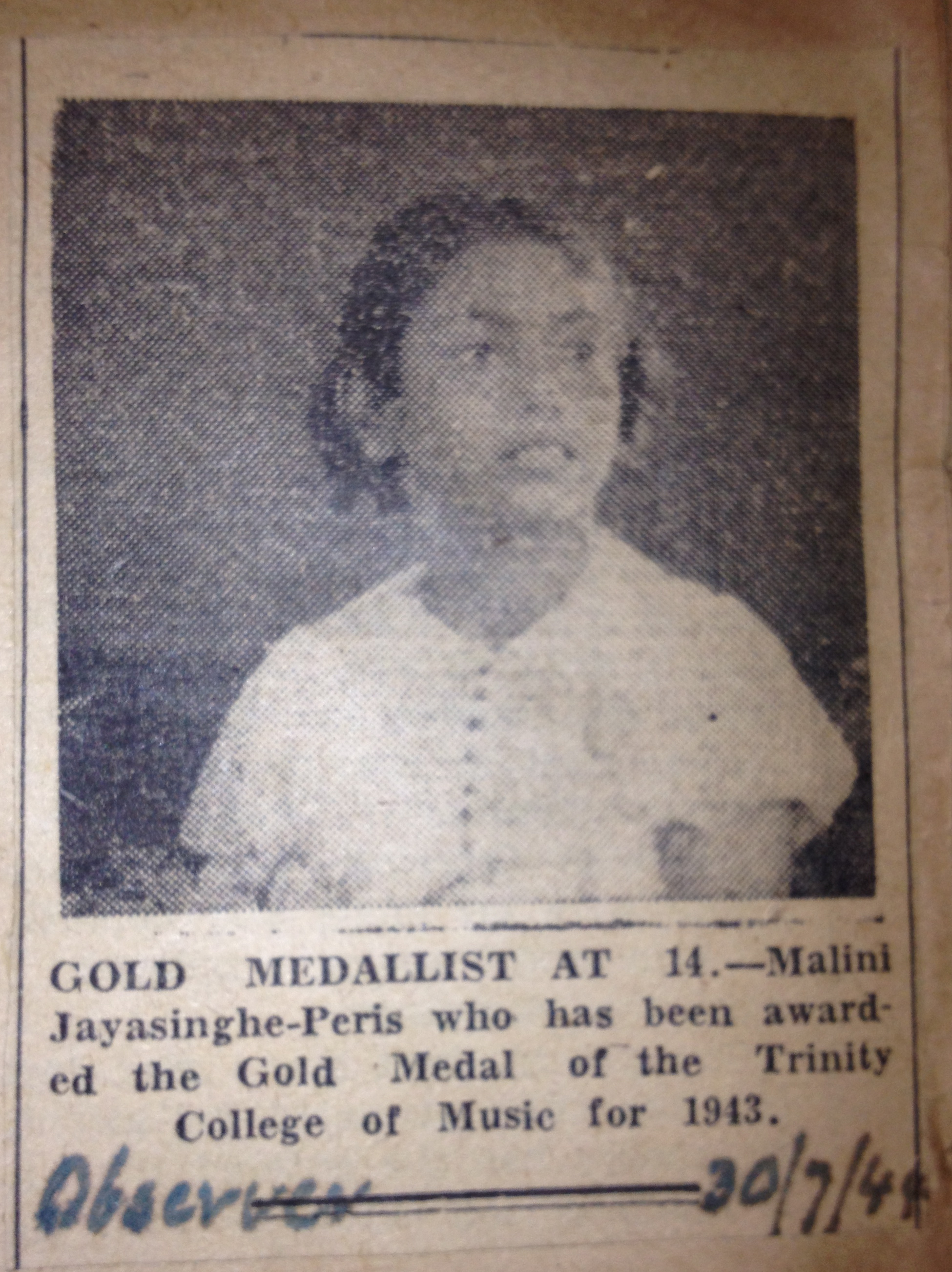
Malinee Paris, the 14 year-old Gold Medalist at Trinity College

She has concertized extensively worldwide. In 1956 she had her American debut in Washington DC to critical acclaim. A critic at The Washington Evening Star exclaimed: ‘I have never heard these much-played pieces in as searchingly beautiful performances.” In 1958 toured the Far East, 1960 Concerts in London and for BBC Radio and Television, and 1964-67 featured engagements in West Germany, Bombay, Madras and New Delhi. During the early days of television in the UK she gave recitals from Alexandra Palace studios in London.

Ms Peris has travelled extensively as a concert pianist. She has performed with major American Orchestras at Lincoln Center, the Kennedy Center, and The Wolf Trap National Park for the Performing Arts and as soloist with orchestras in Europe, Israel and Australia. In 1970, she performed for the United Nations General Assembly in celebration of the 22nd anniversary of its Human Rights Day. Her first solo recital in the US. was at the Washington National Gallery in 1956. Her tours included concerts in Canada ( Expo ’67 in Montreal), Mexico, Israel, Belgium, Czechoslovakia including the Prague Spring Festival, USA, India, China, Australia, Germany, Portugal, and cities in the Far East. She was invited by the Secretary General of the United Nations to play on the 22nd anniversary of Human Rights Day at the General Assembly of the UN. She has given lectures on British Independent Television and played frequently on European radio and TV stations.

Her ideas concerning performance are shaped by a fidelity to compositional intent. Peris stated in 2012, “For me, now, music is about conveying what the composer had in his heart, head and soul. His moods, his feelings.” Her playing has been noted for its tonal color, sensitive phrasing and technical expertise.

In 1958, Peris was on the program of the premiere of the Symphony Orchestra of Sri Lanka’s debut performance where she performed Beethoven’s Fourth Piano Concerto, Op. 58. She was awarded the title of Kala Keerthi by the government of Sri Lanka in 1993, that nation’s highest honor in the arts.

During her career she has collaborated with many contemporary composers. She gave the North American debut of Ned Rorem’s’ 3rd Sonata at a recital at Expo 67 in Montreal, Canada. She has played works by Alan Hovhaness in concert in Germany. She has worked with Paul Ben-Haim in Israel and Zoltán Kodály in Hungary and played their compositions.

== Private life ==
Ms. Peris was married to the late Hon. Douglas A. de Silva (1927-1995) career diplomat, Sri Lankan Ambassador to Belgium, Portugal, and the European Community (1982-1986) and an executive at the World Bank Washington DC. ( IBRD 1968-1982)

She has 3 children Dr. Anil M. de Silva, Dr. Shari M. de Silva, and Dr. Shirin R. de Silva who are physicians in the US and 4 grandchildren; Sandir, Preeya, Karen and Maya.

She continues to play an active role as a reader and Lay Eucharistic Minister at the Washington National Cathedral, and is on the Board of “Dumbarton Concerts” which in addition to its Chamber Music series operates the “ Inner City- Inner Child” program for the benefit of disadvantaged children in Washington DC.

Currently Peris resides in Washington DC and actively performs. As of April, 2016 she has been made Professor Emerita of Music and continues to teach as an adjunct professor of piano at the George Washington University. She was Co-ordinator for Piano and Keyboard Studies for many years She has also reviewed concerts for the Washington Post.

== Awards ==
Among the many awards she received in Sri Lanka were the Gold Medal from the Trinity College of Music London and the Gold Medal from the Associated Board of the Royal Schools of Music London as well as their diplomas for performance. At the Royal College of Music she was awarded the Herbert Fryer Prize, the Marmaduke Barton Prize, and the Hopkinson Silver Medal along with her performance diploma of ARCM.

In February 1993, Malinee Peris was honored by the country of her birth when the President of Sri Lanka bestowed on her the title of "Kala Keerthi", the country's highest honor for excellence in the Arts.

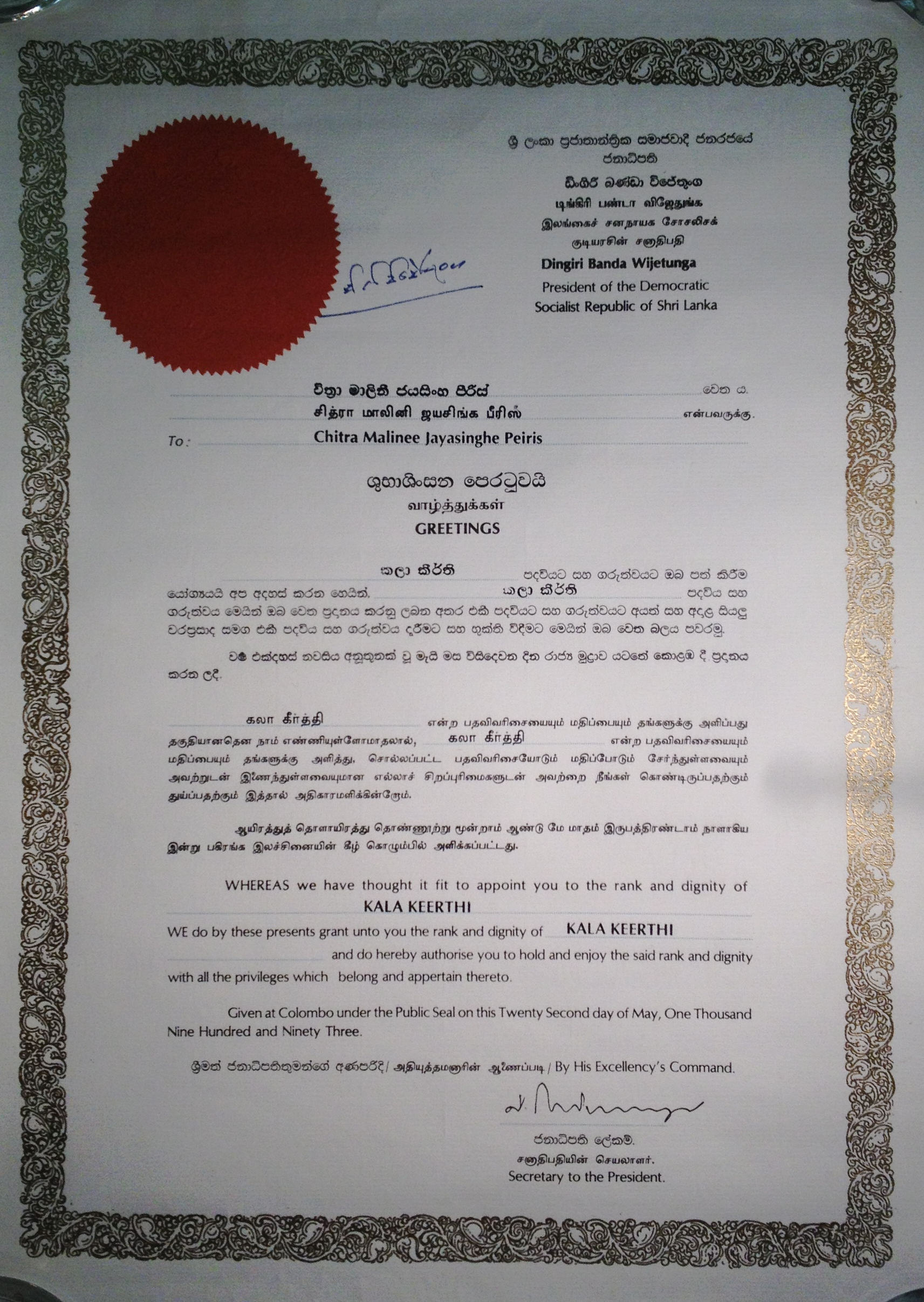
Kala Keerthi Certificate

The Sri Lanka Foundation of America presented Peris with a Lifetime Achievement Award in November 2007.

== Discography ==
Recordings
Year	Title	Label	Catalogue
2010	My Journey from Darkness to Light with Chopin	Amico Artists and Campaign Digital, Inc.	n/a
2007	A Child's Garland of Music	Brioso Recordings	BR154
2005	From Spain to Mexico	Brioso Recordings	BR148
2003	From Portugal to Brazil	Brioso Recordings	BR138
2002	Maurice Ravel and Claude Debussy	Brioso Recordings	BR127
1967	Malinee Peris in a Piano Recital of Works by Debussy, Ravel and De Falla	Ace of Clubs Records	ACL-R 302

Extracts from Paul Hume's (music critic Washington Post) commentary on Malinee Peris's recording of works by Debussy, Ravel and De Falla (Ace of Clubs Records) broadcast by Radio WGMS Washington DC in the series In Recital – February 21, 1968.

Malinee Peris performed several large works for piano, including Debussy's L'isle Joyeuse, Falla's Fantasia Baetica, and Ravel's Gaspard de la Nuit. These compositions are noted for their technical difficulty.

A reviewer noted that Peris' performances in works by composers such as Chopin and Mozart demonstrated her ability to convery the more intimate and lyrical qualities of piano music. The reviewer also observed that her successful performances of technically demanding repertoire highlighted a level of pianistic power that complemented her interpretative sensitivity.
