= Mignonne Fernando =

- Birth name: Mignonette Malathi May Rutnam
- Born: 9 May 1943 (age 81); Colombo, Sri Lanka
- Genres: Soul, R&B, gospel, jazz, rock
- Occupation(s): Singer, songwriter, pianist
- Instrument(s): Singing, piano
- Years active: 1950–present
- Labels: EMI Records (1969–1980)

Mignonne Fernando is a Sri Lankan singer, part of the popular group "The Jetliners".

== Early life ==
Born Mignonette Malathi May Rutnam, she won Radio Ceylon's Talent Contest at the age of seven.

Her interest in law was overtaken by her passion for music, received formal training in Western classical music, speech and drama. This proved to be her greatest strength and an excellent foundation to her musical career that was to follow.

== The Jetliners ==
In 1965, Mignonne along with her group The Jetliners became an instant success under the guidance of manager Tony Fernando who would later become her husband, and their popularity grew. Radio Ceylon, introduced her music not only to a local audience but across South Asia. During the early years of the group the Jetliners enjoyed star billing at the Coconut Grove nightclub situated in the Galle Face Hotel in Colombo.

In 1969, she became the first Sri Lankan to be signed up by EMI Records UK, and Keith Prowse Music London. The Ceylonese song 'Wedding Song' (Mangala Mohotha) was her first song to be copyrighted by KPM.

Her song "Love Don't Let Me Down" won the Embassy Award at the World Popular Song Festival. Another original composition "Someday My Love" won the Matsushita Award and Special Jury Award for Composer and Performer at the Festival of Song.

A Sinhala composition "Oba Nisa" was selected for the finals of the 5th Olympiad of Song in Athens, Greece in 1972 where it won the gold medal. "Coconut Man" made the finals of the World Popular Song Festival in Tokyo, the first time a female singer/composer had ever done so.

== See also ==
- Galle Face Hotel
- List of Sri Lankan musicians
- Colombo
- Radio Ceylon
- Sri Lanka Broadcasting Corporation
