= Symphony Orchestra of Sri Lanka =

Symphony Orchestra of Sri Lanka (SOSL)
- Orchestra
- official logo
- Former name: Symphony Orchestra of Ceylon
- Founded: 1958
- Location: Colombo, Sri Lanka
- Website: www.sosl.org

The Symphony Orchestra of Sri Lanka (SOSL) is based in Colombo, Sri Lanka, and is one of the oldest orchestras in South Asia.

Its first concert was on 13 September 1956 under the baton of Hussain S. Mohamed, and the repertoire was Geminiani's Second Concerto Grosso, Haydn's Symphony no. 92 "Oxford" and Beethoven's Fourth Piano Concerto with Malinee Jayasinghe-Peris as soloist. Kalakeerthi Prof. Earle de Fonseka was the next principal conductor, a position he held from 1960 to 2000. Lalanath de Silva, who was for many years deputy conductor, took over the position of principal conductor from 2000 to 2002.

From 2002 Ajit Abeysekera (2002–2015), Ananda Dabare (2002–2012), Manilal Weerakoon (2002–2011) and Eshantha J. Peiris (2008–2015) have jointly held the position of principal conductor.

The present Principal Conductor is Dushyanthi Perera.

International soloists who have performed with the orchestra include Thomas Brandis and Leon Spierer (violin, then concertmasters of the Berlin Philharmonic Orchestra), Madeleine Mitchell,Gabriel Le Magadure, Domenico Nordio and Hadar Rimon (violin), Margaret Kitchin, Gervase de Peyer and Jonathan Guist (clarinet), Atsushi Kimura, Aron Konczie and Barry Tuckwell (horn), Mayumi Mori (harp), Kimihiko Akiyama and Richard Adeney (flute), Valentin Erben, Paul Olefsky and Rohan de Saram (cello), Rodney Slatford (double bass), Tharanga Goonatilleke (soprano), Druvi de Saram, Peter Cooper, Tanya Ekanayaka, Ian Lake, Robin Zebaida, Anthony Peebles, Ashan Pillai, Natasha Tadson Rimon, Julian Clef, Harsha Abeyaratne, Maxim Puryzhinskiy , Marialena Fernandes, Shani Diluka and Rohan de Silva (piano).

In addition to subscription concerts (the number varies annually), there are other performances on special occasions. It regularly performs at the Ladies College Hall. Sri Lankan, as well as soloists and conductors of other nationalities, including Keiko Kobayashi, James Ross and Gregory Rose, have performed regularly with the orchestra on invitation. In 2013, SOSL gave its first performance at Colombo's new Nelum Pokuna Theatre conducted by James Ross, joined by 35 musicians from the UK and India to form The Commonwealth Festival Orchestra. In February 2017, the Embassy of China invited the SOSL to perform a joint concert with the China National Symphony, China’s national orchestra, to celebrate the 60th anniversary of diplomatic relations between Sri Lanka and China. This concert was held at the BMICH under the patronage of the President and the Prime Minister. Members of the SOSL also frequently perform in the South Asian Symphony Orchestra (SASO).

The SOSL also performed in Tokyo, Japan at the prestigious Tokyo City Opera hall in 2007 with Sri Lankan artists, Harsha Markalanda, Ravibandu Vidyapathi and Jananath Warakagoda as soloists.

== Administration ==
The Governors and the Players' Committees are elected by the players at the Annual General Meeting. The Board of Governors establishes overall policy, raises sponsorship and controls the finances. The Panel of Regents serves in a senior advisory capacity. The Players' Committee makes decisions concerning the music, soloists and the conductors.

== Sri Lankan talent ==
The SOSL takes special interest in fostering young Sri Lankan talent, and dedicates one of its annual subscription concerts to feature Young Soloists, which historically featured the winners of the Concerto Competition, organized by the Symphony Orchestra of Sri Lanka.

The Family Christmas Concert of SOSL is also such an annual event to showcase such young talent. Its Christmas concert of December 2013 held at Bandaranaike Memorial International Conference Hall (BMICH) in Colombo saw the orchestra conducted by Eshantha Pieris and featured vocalists Charin Mendis and Sheranga Perera. In December 2018, the Family Christmas Concert was held at the Ladies College Hall, conducted by Dushyanthi Perera and featured performances by soloists Dmitri Gunatilake and Niran De Mel and performances by the Old Joes’ Choir and the Menaka Singers.

The Junior Symphony Orchestra (JSO) is a training programme run by the Symphony Orchestra of Sri Lanka to develop young musicians, in the art of ensemble playing. The JSO is directed by Dushyanthi Perera, who brings over 50 years of orchestral performance experience, coaching students in interpretation and ensemble skills alongside senior SOSL players who provide technical guidance. The JSO is open to all young musicians under the age of 30.

== SOSL Outreach ==
The SOSL Outreach Programme takes the form of a series of lecture concerts. Children who have never seen a symphony orchestra before are introduced to the instruments that make up the sections of an orchestra. The range, tone, and method of sound production of each instrument is demonstrated. Students, Teachers and Parents are invited, free of charge, to attend these concerts. The first of these concerts took place in Galle, Sri Lanka on 24 April 2010. The Second was in Kilinochchi in the north of Sri Lanka, in November 2011. The Third was at the Veerasingham Hall, Jaffna, on 17 November 2012.

The Junior Symphony Orchestra performed to a full house of students and music educators in Karapitiya Medical Faculty Auditorium, Galle in January 2026.

== Finances ==
The SOSL is a not for profit organisation which depends on public support as well as corporate sector and occasionally diplomatic sponsorship for its activities.
