= Indrani Karunarathne =

Sri Lankan writer, singer

- Occupations: Novelist, short story writer
- Writing career
- Period: 20th century
- Genre: Western Fiction
- Subjects: Thriller, Adventure, Romance
- Movement: Modern literature

Indrani Karunarathne (Sinhala: ඉන්ද්‍රානි කරුණාරත්න) is a Sri Lankan singer and novelist who is best known for her translations of Western novels to Sinhalese.

== Early life ==
She was born on 15 February in Borella, as the second of three girls in the family. Her father, Abeypala Perera was a Buddhist and mother, Muriel Perera was a Christian. She had one elder sister, Mallika and one younger sister, Iranganie. Indrani studied at Presbyterian Girls School in Regent Street. She studied Kandyan Dancing in the school. Her sister Mallika began singing in 1965 where she was the playback singer for the film Sama.

She is married to James Sri Nivasan in 1979. She met him during the production of his song Ha Ha Hore Danuna, where he was the Lotus Disc producer. The couple has one daughter, Anjalie Charukeshi and one son, Pastor Nimendra Dhananjaya. Nimendra is married to Roshani. He went to St. Thomas' College. After that he studied A/L at the Royal Institute. Later in 2009, Nimendra obtained a degree in Business Studies.

== Professional career ==
From a young age, Indrani preferred going to church all dressed up to sing hymns. She started her singing career with the Fire Flies band of Dalrene Suby. In 1969, Indrani sang her first song Dilhani Duwani, which was previously voiced by Annesley Malewana. Then she was invited to join the popular musical band The Moonstones led by Clarence Wijewardena and Malewana. In December 1969, she along with Iranganie and Mallika and formed the female vocal group "Three Sisters". On 31 December 1969, she made her first appearance at a dance show at the Hotel Taprobane with The Moonstones. The Three Sisters sang together in concerts until Mallika died in 1980. After the death of her elder sister, younger sister Iranganie and Indrani sang as a duo, but later Iranganie moved away from singing.

Indrani has sung several popular hits including, Thiline Lesin, Wasanthaye Mal Kekulai, Sudu Asu Pita Nagala, Kageda Gon Wassa, Kumudu Mal and Mathakaya Asurin. In 1973, she sang many songs with The Moonstones such as Sigiriya and Ha Ha Hore. Apart from that, she also worked as a playback singer in many films such as Podi Malli, Dinum Kanuwa, Lassana Kella, Sadahatama Oba Mage and Sikuruliya. In 1970s, she recorded Baila duets with Desmond de Silva and Paul Fernando.

=== Selected awards ===
In 2014, Indrani won the Soul Sounds Award for her contribution to the music industry. Then in 2015, she won an award from the National Catholic Literary Association and in 2016 by the Provincial Literary Association. In 2019, The Janabhimani or Hela Maha Rawana Rajabhimani Awards Ceremony was held at the Jasmine Auditorium at the BMICH where Indrani won the Best Service Award.

=== Translations ===
- Jack Higgins (2007). The Eagle Has Landed [Sinhalese: උකුසු දඩයම]. ISBN 978-955-652-325-6.
- Harper Lee. To Kill a Mockingbird [Sinhalese: පයට පෑගෙන දූවිලි]. ISBN 9552063922.
- Enid Blyton. Tales of Betsy-May [Sinhalese: බෙට්සි මේ ගේ කතා]. ISBN 978-955-890-979-9.
- Piers Paul Read (2005). Alive [Sinhalese: ජීවතුන් අතර]. ISBN 978-955-652-246-4.
- Dave Pelzer. A Man Named Dave -My Story [Sinhalese: පියාපත් ලැබුවෙමු].
- Paul Gallico (2006). The Boy who Invented the Bubble Gun -An Odyssey of Innocence [Sinhalese: ජුලියන්ගේ සිහිනය]. ISBN 978-955-138-780-8.
- Sophia Prokofieva. Adventures on Captains Island [Sinhalese: කපිතාන්ගේ දූපත]. ISBN 978-955-138-795-2.
- Harriet Beecher Stowe (2007). Uncle Tom's Cabin [Sinhalese: ටොම් මාමාගේ ලෝකය]. ISBN 978-955-652-296-9.
- Gillian Rubinstein (2014). Space Demons [Sinhalese: අභ්‍යවකාශ භූතයෝ]. ISBN 978-955-691-076-6.
- Michihiko Hachiya. Hiroshima Doctor [Sinhalese: ආයුබෝවන් හිරෝෂිමා]. ISBN 978-955-652-828-2.
- Gillian Rubinstein. Skymaze [Sinhalese: අහස් දැල]. ISBN 978-955-691-077-3.
- Lionel Davidson. Kolymsky Heights [Sinhalese: කොලිම්ස්කි කලු වලල්ලෙන් එහා]. ISBN 978-955-145-162-2.

=== Other works ===
- Karunạratna, Indraṇi (2011). Meru Sinhalese: මෙරු. ISBN 978-955-017-166-8.
- Hiru Nodutuwemu Sinhalese: හිරු නොදුටුවෙමු. ISBN 978-955-017-147-7.
- Wasanawantha Jeevithayak Sinhalese: වාසනාවන්ත ජීවිතයක්. ISBN 978-955-691-079-7.
- Aprikawe Visi Wasarak Sinhalese: අප්‍රිකාවේ විසි වසරක්. ISBN 978-955-691-095-7.
