= Deepika Udagama =

Sr Lankan academic and activist

- Education: University of Colombo
- Occupations: professor, activist

Dr. Deepika Udagama is a Sri Lankan professor, academic administrator, human rights activist and also served as the Head of the Human Rights Commission of Sri Lanka. She has served as the head of the Department of Law and at the University of Peradeniya. She has specialised on the field of international Human Rights law. She served as Sri Lanka's alternate member to the United Nations (UN) Sub-Commission on the promotion and protection of Human Rights, and the UN Sub-Commission's Co-Special Reporter on Globalisation and its impact on Human Rights. Dr. Udagama was the founding director of the Centre for the Study of Human Rights at the Faculty of Law. She serves as the Chairperson of the Sri Lanka Foundation's Commission on Democracy and Human Rights. She holds and LLB and LLM (University of Colombo) and a JSD (Calif.).

On 3 August 2020, she tendered her official resignation from the position of the head of the Human Rights Commission of Sri Lanka.
