= Kumar Navaratnam =

Kumar Navaratnam was a popular rock and roll singer in Colombo, Sri Lanka during the 1960s and 1970s.

== Sri Lankan music ==
The dominant music genre in Sri Lanka is (and still remains) Sinhalese and Tamil pop songs based on Bollywood film music and the local Baila music. Thus, the emergence of Western rock bands in the 1980s was regarded as an unusual phenomenon. Further, Navaratnam was a minority Tamil musician in a field dominated by Goans, foreigners and other locals.

== End of an era ==
As a musician, he started as a bass guitarist and switched to lead guitar, introducing Rock and Hard Rock to Sri Lankan audiences. His departure to Bourneville, USA at the height of his popularity in the late 1970s created a void in the music scene in Sri Lanka that lasted for sometime. The sheer number of rock music festivals and concerts Navaratnam conducted (famed for running from 6.00pm to 6.00am, particularly at Havelock Park) is yet to be matched by contemporary rock groups on the island. Kumar remains regarded as a pioneer of Sri Lankan Western music.
