= Athma Liyanage =

Sri Lankan singer and songwriter

- Born: June 1st Sri Lanka
- Genres: Sri Lankan contemporary
- Occupations: Singer-songwriter; Instrumentalist
- Instruments: Vocals; keyboards
- Years active: 1989–present

Athma Liyanage is a Sri Lankan singer and songwriter. He became popular in the early 90s with the song 'Liyathambara'. He gained popularity with the Millennial generation with his new songs 'Ayemath adaren' and 'Sitha dura handa'.

== Discography ==
=== Singles ===
- "Liyathambara" (1989)
- Epa Kandulel Sala (1989)
- "Kandu pamula sita"
- "Ayemath adaren" (2011)
- "Sitha dura handa" (2011)
- "Na Thawath Hithak" (2015)
- "Ahimi Nethu Aga" (2016)

=== Albums ===
- Liyathambara One Man Orchestra (1989)
