= Allen Ratnayake =

- Also known as: Allen Master
- Born: Allen Ratnayake; Sri Lanka
- Genres: Folk, Sri Lankan Countrymusic
- Occupation: Musician
- Instrument: Vocals

Allen Ratnayake was an early Sri Lankan singer and musician. Ratnayake sang for various Record labels like His Master's Voice and Columbia and scholars and musicians like Gunapala Perera used to mention his name among the other famous artists in the gramophone era of Ceylon. Ratnayake had given his voice for many Sinhala gramophone records. "Jethawanarame Athi Ramani" is one of his musical albums which consisted of Nine soundtracks. "Anoma Gan Theere", "Jethawanarame athi Ramani" are two famous songs of Allen ratnayake.

== Sound Tracks ==
- Anoma Gan Theere
- Bhagya Shree Sundara
- Bhawa Andhakara Bindahera
- Jethawanarame Athi Ramani
- Lo Natha Gauthama
- Mahamaya Muni Matha
- Matha Pitha Denna
- Poda Ramya Sri
- Pura Pura Shree
