= Tanya Ekanayaka =

- Born: Tanya Nissani Ilangakkone Ekanayaka; 6 May 1977 (age 49); Kandy, Sri Lanka
- Citizenship: Sri Lanka; United Kingdom
- Occupation: Composer-Pianist

Academic background
- Education: University of Peradeniya (BA - Honours); University of Edinburgh (MSc, PhD)
- Musical career
- Genres: Classical; World; Contemporary
- Label: Naxos
- Website: www.tanyaekanayaka.com

Tanya Ekanayaka (born 6 May 1977) is a Sri Lankan-British contemporary virtuoso composer-pianist, classically trained and with a background in Asian and World music as well as a record producer, musicologist and linguist. Notably, she is among the world’s most prolific female composer-pianists.

== Early life ==
She began studying the piano at the age of five, and at the age of twelve made her debut recital. At the age of sixteen, as youngest competitor and joint winner of the biennial concerto competition of the Symphony Orchestra of Sri Lanka, she performed her first concerto.

== Career ==
Ekanayaka's debut album of compositions for solo piano composed, performed and produced by her, Reinventions: Rhapsodies for Piano, was released in 2015. Each work in the album builds upon a motif inspired by the tonality of the works which preceded it in its primary concert performance and adaptations of melodies belonging to genres of Sri Lankan traditional and folk music.

Twelve Piano Prisms, her second solo album of works for the piano, was released on 14 September 2018.

Ekanayaka's debut album contains adaptations of 10 of the 18 Sri Lankan Vannams while her second album contains adaptations of the remaining 8 Vannams along with adaptations of indigenous and traditional melodies of Armenia, China, Japan, the United Kingdom and the United States of America.

The Planets & Humanity - Piano Reflections, her third solo album of works for the piano, was released on 14 May 2021.

The works in this album correspond to reflections on the eight planets of earth’s solar system and earth’s seven continents and most contain trans-creations of melodies of indigenous peoples of Africa, Asia, Australia/Oceania, Europe, North America and South America, specifically, melodies of the Asháninka, Cree, Gond, Hadza, Numbulwar and Sámi people.

18 Piano Sutras & 25 South Asian Pianisms is Ekanayaka's double album, of 43 works for solo piano composed in 2021 and 2022 and released in April 2023.

The 43 compositions draw on 40 human languages and 42 traditional secular songs containing lyrics in these languages, with the 18 languages underlying the 18 Sutras of Disc 1 spread across the six continents of Africa, Asia, Europe, North America, Oceania and South America, being endangered, critically endangered, at risk, threatened, very old, no longer spoken or in some cases extinct, and the remaining 22 languages underlying the 25 South Asian Pianisms of Disc 2 being predominant in the eight nations of Afghanistan, Bangladesh, Bhutan, India, The Maldives, Nepal, Pakistan and Sri Lanka, forming Ekanayaka’s home region, South Asia.

The 40 languages underlying the 43 compositions of 18 Piano Sutras & 25 South Asian Pianisms are Ainu, Bantawa, Bengali, Bhutanese Nepali, Bumthang, Chakma, Chamorro, Dari, Dhivehi, Dzongkha, Efé/Lese, Garifuna, Hindi, Kannada, Karaim, Khowar, Koda, Kolyma Yukaghir, Konomihu, Guna, Mordvinic, Nepali, Nyangatom, Odia, Pashto, Puluwat, Shaninawa (a Yaminawá dialect cluster), Shimaore, Sindhi, Sinhala, Sogdian, Sri Lankan English/English, Sri Lankan Malay, Sri Lankan Tamil, Saptari Tharu, Trinidad Bhojpuri, Tsimané, Urdu, Vedda and Wahgi.

16 Sri Lankan Piano Isles, Ekanayaka’s sixth solo album of sixteen compositions for solo piano drawing on 16 Sri Lankan coastal and inland isles and representing two distinct forms of composition-performance was released on 23 May 2025.

Eight works of 16 Sri Lankan Piano Isles were composed from 2022 to 2024 while the album's eight Extempore Compositions represent a form of composition-performance not presented in any of Ekanayaka’s previous work, involving simultaneous composition-recording on a single day of the album’s recording session, each incorporating a unique musical motif and each in one take.

Ekanayaka is the first Sri Lankan composer, in history, to have complete albums of original music released worldwide by international record labels.

She also developed a music composition project from 2012 to 2014. The project aimed to assist war-affected and impoverished Sri Lankan school children recovering from the country's thirty year civil war.

Ekanayaka holds a Bachelor of Arts (Honours) degree from the University of Peradeniya and a Master of Science degree and PhD from the University of Edinburgh. She is a Fellow (FTCL) of the Trinity College of Music (UK), a Licentiate (LRSM) of the Royal Schools of Music (UK) and Licentiate (LGSMD) of the Guildhall School of Music & Drama (UK) which awarded her its Professional Performer's Diploma (PPD) in 1999.

A distinguishing feature of Ekanayaka’s artistry relates to her unique musical memory which has meant that all her compositions are published in recorded format only; she has never notated any of her compositions but instead all of them (with the exception of her extempore compositions), reside naturally and precisely in her memory enabling her to perform them repeatedly with precise detail. She is also ambidextrous and has a synaesthesia, which influence her style of composition.

== Key works (published) ==
- Adahas: Of Wings Of Roots (2010), for piano
- Dhaivaya: Altering Hue (2011), for piano
- Labyrinth; Vannam Lent (2012), for piano
- Dew Encounters: Of Scottish Walks, Vannam (Udara) & Sri Lanka's Bugs Bunny (2013), for piano
- Vannam (Gajaga, Mayura & Hanuma) & You (2013), for piano
- In Lotus: Olu Pipila With Moment (2013), for piano
- 2013/14 June Echoes (2013–14), for piano
- G – With Paaru Kavi (2016), for piano
- F – Renewal & Goyam Kapuma (2016), for piano
- F Sharp – Kitty & Bambaru (2016), for piano
- E Flat – July 2016/17 (2016–17), for piano
- B Flat – Armenia to a Pearl (2017), for piano
- C – Emerald Lapwing Karpet (2017), for piano
- D Flat – Intuition, Auld Lang Syne & an Asian Sacred (2017), for piano
- E – Arrow-and (2017), for piano
- A – Zuni Sea (2017), for piano
- A Flat Scintilla: Komitas Unto Childhood (2017), for piano
- B – Of Vannam & Zhuang Tai Qiu Si (2017), for piano
- D – Hana Hare (2017), for piano
- Neptune: Asháninka Kindled (2018 & 2020), for piano
- Mercury with Antarctica (2019–20), for piano
- Uranus: Numbulwar Sustaining (2020), for piano
- Venus: Sámi Traced (2019–20), for piano
- Saturn: Gond Inspired (2019), for piano
- Earth – Life (2020), for piano
- Jupiter: Cree Cast (2020), for piano
- Mars: Hadzabe Touched (2020), for piano
- Yelimu (2021–22), for piano
- Ruyanpe (2021), for piano
- Agidu (2021), for piano
- Ushe (2021), for piano
- Yuhuma (2021), for piano
- Tolou (2021), for piano
- Tunder (2021), for piano
- Nim (2021), for piano
- Ekitala (2021), for piano
- Ihua (2021), for piano
- Seiri (2021), for piano
- Anlamach (2021), for piano
- Kandaani (2021), for piano
- Tumaiguini (2021), for piano
- Uvhendza (2021), for piano
- Niyare (2021), for piano
- Takeimalo (2021), for piano
- Pavaz (2021), for piano
- Khirkey (2021), for piano
- Dhatoh (2021), for piano
- Khwe (2021), for piano
- Parun (2021), for piano
- Emrouz (2021), for piano
- Sabaa (2021), for piano
- Kaini (2021), for piano
- Noshwor (2021), for piano
- Ipil (2021), for piano
- Vissaara (2021), for piano
- Lewa (2021), for piano
- Turi (2021), for piano
- Vishraam (2022), for piano
- Neralu (2022), for piano
- Ghara (2022), for piano
- Subhane (2022), for piano
- Aabshaar (2022), for piano
- Iskim (2022), for piano
- Dhwani (2022), for piano
- Cirai (2022), for piano
- Numa (2022), for piano
- Indraikku (2022), for piano
- Siithu (2022), for piano
- Nivahan (2022), for piano
- Ode To South Asia (2022), for piano
- Kera-Extempore (2024), for piano
- Little Barnacle (2022), for piano
- Elubu-Extempore (2024), for piano
- Soliloquy (2022), for piano
- Manthivu-Extempore (2024), for piano
- Sallithivu Scaevola (2023), for piano
- Palaithi-Extempore (2024), for piano
- Cadence (2023–24), for piano
- Analai-Extempore (2024), for piano
- Blue Rock Dove Tell (2022), for piano
- Nai-Extempore (2024), for piano
- Coral Muse (2022–23), for piano
- Ithivu-Extempore (2024), for piano
- Realms (2023–24), for piano
- Riyathi-Extempore (2024), for piano
- Luminary Crows (2023–24), for piano
