= Robert Hall Lewis =

American composer and conductor

Robert Hall Lewis (April 22, 1926 – March 22, 1996) was an American composer, conductor, and trumpet player who taught at Goucher College (1958 – 1995) and Peabody Conservatory (1958 – 1995), both in Baltimore, Maryland. His works were performed widely, by such ensembles as the American Composers Orchestra, Baltimore Symphony Orchestra, Boston Symphony Orchestra, Group for Contemporary Music, Gruppe Neue Musik, London Sinfonietta, London Symphony Orchestra, Parnassus, and the Philharmonia Orchestra, and many have been recorded commercially, often with the composer conducting.

Lewis received BM (1949), MM (1951), and PhD (1964) degrees in composition from the Eastman School of Music in Rochester, New York, where his principal teacher was Bernard Rogers. He also studied composition privately during the 1950s with Nadia Boulanger (in Paris) and Hans Erich Apostel (in Vienna), and conducting with Pierre Monteux.

His style is atonal and textural in orientation. His music is filled with arresting timbral combinations and projects its often densely complex rhythmic structures with the utmost clarity.

== Bibliography ==
- Sam Di Bonaventura (2001), "Lewis, Robert Hall," The New Grove Dictionary of Music and Musicians, edited by Stanley Sadie and John Tyrrell. London: Macmillan.
- Robert Hall Lewis, "Nuances II, Symphony 2, Concerto For Chamber Orchestra," CRI CR596, liner notes.
- Robert Hall Lewis, "[Music of] Robert Hall Lewis," New World Composer Recordings NWCR 569, liner notes.
