= Sadiris Master =

Sri Lankan musician and actor

Jothiratnage Sadiris de Silva (died 1958), better known as Sadiris Master, was a Sri Lankan musician and actor.

Sadiris was born in Matara. He was educated at the Temple in Kalutara and studied oriental language. Sadiris later became a popular musician singing and playing Hindustani and Karnatic music. He also acted in several John de Silva plays taking the lead role; Sirisangabo, Wessantara. Sadiris died on April 8, 1958.
