= Dumbarton Concerts =

Dumbarton Concerts is an American nonprofit organization which presents classical chamber and jazz music performances in Washington, D.C. Since then the late 1970s, Dumbarton Concerts has presented a variety of well-known artists, including Brooklyn Rider, the Salomé Chamber Orchestra, A Far Cry, Matt Haimovitz, Grace Kelly Quartet, Alban Gerhardt, Buck Hill, Nordic Voices, Sharon Isbin and Shirley Horn.

Dumbarton concerts also sponsors Inner City-Inner Child, an arts outreach program for children in the Washington, D.C., area. The program receives funding from the DC Commission on the Arts and Humanities.

== History ==
Dumbarton Concerts was founded by Connie Zimmer and Leah Johnson in 1978. The pair chose Dumbarton United Methodist Church in Georgetown. for its favorable acoustics and Civil War history. The organization began organizing and hosting a variety of musical events. There was no charge for admission the first year, but in the second they charged a small admission fee.

From 2006 to 2011, Domenik Maican was the organization's composer-in-residence; several of his works were performed as part of the concert series during this time. The organization has continued to present works which were specifically commissioned for the venue.

At the end of the 2012/2013 season, Zimmer stepped down after serving as the organization's executive director for 35 years.
