= Prince Udaya Priyantha =

Sri Lankan singer

- ප්‍රින්ස් උදය ප්‍රියන්ත
- Born: 13 June 1970; Elpitiya, Galle
- Died: 8 June 2017 (aged 46); Nawaloka Hospital, Colombo
- Education: Elpitiya Ananda Maha Vidyalaya
- Alma mater: Belwood Music Academy
- Occupations: singer, songwriter, musician
- Musical career
- Genres: Pop; soul; rhythm and blues; Indian classical music
- Instruments: Vocals, violin, keyboard
- Years active: 1991–2017

Prince Udaya Priyantha (Sinhala: ප්‍රින්ස් උදය ප්‍රියන්ත; 13 June 1970 – 8 June 2017) was a Sri Lankan singer, composer and songwriter.

== Personal life ==
Born in the rural village of Siripura, Nawadagala in Galle, Prince started his music career as a keyboard player in the early 1990s, with his inborn abilities. His father Eaton Fernando, was a former violinist in Sri Lanka Broadcasting Corporation, and also a former principal and a music teacher. His mother Rosalyn Palliyaguruge was also principal, who died in 2014 in a Dubai Hospital. Prince has one sister, Shiromi Priyangika, who cared for Prince until his death.

He stated that, though he has not married, he had a relationship with fellow female singer Nirosha Virajini, which did not extend up to the marriage, however.

== Singing career ==
Prince completed his education from Elpitiya Ananda Maha Vidyalaya and showcased his musical abilities at the time of school. His first music teacher was Nihal Gamhewa, but the classes were interrupted due to 1987–89 JVP insurrections. In 1990, Prince attended the Belwood Music Academy of National Youth Services Council and worked as a violinist, under Gamhewa. He completed Bellwood Diploma after three years along with fellow musicians such as Chandana Liyanaarachchi, and Jayasiri Amarasekara. With the completion, he asked his music teacher to write some songs for him. With that, Gamhewa wrote four songs for him, which included Pemwathun Sinase, Werala Konaka Hida, Adare Nam Ai, Sanda Kumariyak. These four songs were highlighted due to the usage of musical instrument Octapad for the first time in Sri Lankan music industry.

He popularized as a singer in 1992 with the song Sanda Kumariyak Digeka Yanawa and made his mark in open stages and television music industry. Some of his most popular songs include Sigiriye Kurutu Geetha, Oba Hamuwu Dine, Sudu Mal Pokurak, Sadarenu Wahena and Samudenna Samuganna Nam.

== Illness and death ==
In 2014, after his mother's death, Prince was hospitalized in Dubai due to trauma. On 17 December 2015, Prince was first admitted to Karapitiya Teaching Hospital due to intense fever and his brain was infected with germs. With his critical condition, many welfare organizations and fellow artists started to collect funds to cure him. After some treatments, Prince was released from the hospital but had to take medicines continuously. When he was at home, many rumors indicated that he was healthier, but his sister denied all those and informed that Prince was not well and he has treatments for diabetes and malfunctioning left leg.

However, in March 2017, Prince was hospitalized again to Nawaloka Hospital due to germ infection to his brain. He has to be treated with injection course each for five consecutive days. Many rumors around the internet informed that he was dead, but were refused by his sister many times. Due to these rumours, the funds for his treatments also reduced and this induced his family to sell their land properties and vehicles as well. Meanwhile, Minister of Parliament Reforms and Mass Media Gayantha Karunathilaka presented a cheque amounting to Rs. 100,000 for his medical treatments as well.

On 8 June 2017, Prince died at the hospital at the age of 47. His body was kept for 4 days at his residence and buried on 11 June 2017. However, the hospital bill was not finalized prior to his death. The total of more than 25 lakhs was finalized after a donation from a musical show organized by the Sri Lanka Singer Association.

== Track listing ==
Sanda Kumariyak album included songs
No.	Title	Length
1.	"Pemwathun Sinase" (Album Version)
2.	"Werala Konaka Hinda" (Album Version)
3.	"Sangeetha Sagare" (Album Version)
4.	"Adare Nam" (Album Version)
5.	"Ma Awanhaledi" (Album Version)
6.	"Hinahenna Yalith" (Album Version)
7.	"Sudu Wali Visitunu" (Album Version)
8.	"Oba Hamuwu Dine" (Album Version)
9.	"Pini Watena" (Album Version)
10.	"Malak Thaniwa pipila" (Album Version)
11.	"Sanda Kumariyak" (Album Version)
12.	"Wijithaya Adaraye" (Album Version)

Sith Ahase album included songs
No.	Title	Length
1.	"Sanda Vimasanneth" (Album Version)	03.41
2.	"Aapasu Herenna" (Album Version)	03.47
3.	"Amawakata" (Album Version)	04.28
4.	"Porondam" (Album Version)	03.35
5.	"Sathuta Bo Langai" (Album Version)	04.00
6.	"Ekama Heenaya" (Album Version)	03.34
7.	"Rae Nethupiyan" (Album Version)	03.06
8.	"Oba Magenam" (Album Version)	03.35
9.	"Kaale Hondanam" (Album Version)	03.30
10.	"Kandula Thawath" (Album Version)	03.35
11.	"Maa Obemai" (Album Version)	03.54
12.	"Rahasin Kiya" (Album Version)	03.23
13.	"Vishmitha Nagaraya" (Album Version)	03.32
14.	"Sith Ahase (title song)" (Album Version)	03.56
15.	"Sathutu Sina Muwa Randawa (title song)" (Album Version)	03.24

Pem Wedana album included songs
No.	Title	Length
1.	"Sudu Mal Pokurak" (Album Version)	04.16
2.	"Oba Pa Pem Sina" (Album Version)	03.24
3.	"Mahada Premadare" (Album Version)	03.34
4.	"Oba Ha Gewu Aththe" (Album Version)	03.23
5.	"Nilwan Guwan Gabe" (Album Version)	03.33
6.	"Ma Handawala" (Album Version)	04.03
7.	"Golu Hadawathakata" (Album Version)	03.52
8.	"Ra Uyan Thalawe" (Album Version)	03.38
9.	"Pem Weedana" (Album Version)	03.47
10.	"Pujasane" (Album Version)	03.31
11.	"Sihilel Wasanthe" (Album Version)	03.40
12.	"Sulange Sali" (Album Version)	03.55
13.	"Oba Kawurundo" (Album Version)
14.	"Samudenna Sumuganna" (Album Version)	03.36
15.	"Siyolanga Dawa" (Album Version)	03.32
16.	"Dahasak De Kiyannai" (Album Version)	03.26

Evoke Album No. 32 Sanda Kumariyak album included songs
No.	Title	Length
1.	"Hinahenna Yalith" (Album Version)	03.04
2.	"Maa Awanhaledi" (Album Version)	03.49
3.	"Malak Thaniwa" (Album Version)	03.19
4.	"Oba Hamu Wu Dine" (Album Version)	02.33
5.	"Pemwathun Sinase" (Album Version)	03.32
6.	"Pini Watena" (Album Version)	03.29
7.	"Sangeetha Saagare" (Album Version)	03.00
8.	"Sudu Wali Visirunu" (Album Version)	03.29
9.	"Vijithaye Adaraye" (Album Version)	03.50
10.	"Werala Konaka Hida" (Album Version)	02.57
11.	"Sanda Kumariyak (title song)" (Album Version)	03.10

Sunflower With Prince 1 album included songs
No.	Title	Length
1.	"Kandulu Ganga Gala" (Album Version)	03.23
2.	"Ma Eda Kiyu De" (Album Version)	03.17
3.	"Maa Handawala" (Album Version)	04.03
4.	"Mahada Premadare" (Album Version)	03.34
5.	"Nilwan Guwan Gabe" (Album Version)	03.33
6.	"Oba Ha Gevu Athethe" (Album Version)	03.26
7.	"Oba Hamuvu Dine" (Album Version)	02.33
8.	"Oba Pae Pem Sina" (Album Version)	03.24
9.	"Pemwathun Sinase" (Album Version)	03.40
10.	"Saapa Karannepa" (Album Version)	02.56
11.	"Sanda Kumariyak" (Album Version)	03.10
12.	"Sithin Iwasanna Bae" (Album Version)	03.18
13.	"Samudenna Samuganna Nam" (Album Version)	03.36
14.	"Sudu Mal Pokurak" (Album Version)	04.16
15.	"Sudu Wali Wisirunu" (Album Version)	03.33
16.	"Werala Konaka" (Album Version)	02.58

Sunflower With Prince 2 album included songs
No.	Title	Length
1.	"Doopathe Yaluwe" (Album Version)	03.38
2.	"Warella" (Album Version)	04.00
3.	"Ninda Nathe" (Album Version)	02.39
4.	"Wijithaye Adaraye" (Album Version)	02.55
5.	"Mage Senehasa" (Album Version)	03.27
6.	"Sudo Sudata" (Album Version)	04.00
7.	"Pini Watena" (Album Version)	03.58
8.	"Adareta Kodukara" (Album Version)	04.01
9.	"Poojasane" (Album Version)	03.31
10.	"Mae Mawathe" (Album Version)	03.26
11.	"Obe Suwanda" (Album Version)	04.16
12.	"Kandulu Mal" (Album Version)	03.05
13.	"Sangeetha Sagare" (Album Version)	03.03
14.	"Maa Awanhale" (Album Version)	03.50
15.	"Oba Pidu Adare" (Album Version)	04.03
16.	"Hinahenna Yalith" (Album Version)	03.03

Rosa Malaka album included songs
No.	Title	Length
1.	"Ahinsakawa Sanda" (Album Version)	04.15
2.	"Sanda Saviya" (Album Version)	03,23
3.	"Sandak Nam" (Album Version)	03.48
4.	"Sanda Raththaran" (Album Version)	03.42
5.	"Ithin Api" (Album Version)	04.08
6.	"Muthu Kanduleli Pisada" (Album Version)	04.08
7.	"Mangala Dawase" (Album Version)	03.28
8.	"Hari Lassana Kandulu" (Album Version)	03.16
9.	"La Maluwe" (Album Version)
10.	"Adai Amawaka" (Album Version)	04.21
11.	"Hasunaka Leewata" (Album Version)	03.41
12.	"Samawa Denu" (Album Version)
13.	"Sanda Diya Balana" (Album Version)
14.	"His Thanak Liya" (Album Version)
15.	"Sonduru Mal Yayaka" (Album Version)	03.43
16.	"Prema Poojawak" (Album Version)	03.09

Adarei Raththaran album included songs
No.	Title	Length
1.	"Da Ne Nil" (Album Version)
2.	"Tharu Wage As" (Album Version)	03.36
3.	"Ahinsaka Poojawak" (Album Version)
4.	"Mage Kandulu" (Album Version)	03.37
5.	"Kandulu Mal Pethi" (Album Version)	03.05
6.	"Kandulu Bindu Bindu" (Album Version)	03.55
7.	"Sudu Nelumak" (Album Version)	04.02
8.	"Adarayen Hithanna" (Album Version)	03.40
9.	"Waraduna Kurumanama" (Album Version)
10.	"Boomalu Kusumaka" (Album Version)
11.	"Sanda Naa" (Album Version)
12.	"Dunu Dunna Kandulu" (Album Version)
13.	"Palamu Senehasa" (Album Version)	04.25
14.	"Sanda Awith Giya" (Album Version)	03.27
15.	"Wasanthayak Doo" (Album Version)
16.	"Daa Tharu" (Album Version)

Liyathambara Mala album by Prince Udaya Priyantha & Chandana Liyanarachchi included songs
No.	Title	Length
1.	"Ambayaluwe" (Album Version)	03.49
2.	"Ei Oba Shokayen" (Album Version)	03.19
3.	"Liyathambara Mala" (Album Version)	03.51
4.	"Niwan Guwan" (Album Version)	03.28
5.	"Obepe Pemsina" (Album Version)	03.33
6.	"Pem Wedana" (Album Version)	03.46
7.	"Poojasane" (Album Version)	03.40
8.	"Samedenna Samuganna Nam" (Album Version)	03.35
9.	"Sudu Mal Pokurak" (Album Version)	04.15
10.	"Sulanga Sali" (Album Version)	03.48

Sigiriye Kurutu Gee album included songs
No.	Title	Length
1.	"Kala Male Kohe Giyado" (Album Version)	04.08
2.	"Kandulu Ketharam" (Album Version)	06.33
3.	"Kavi Kiyanna" (Album Version)	03.17
4.	"Kelani Gangata" (Album Version)	04.24
5.	"Mama Kurulu" (Album Version)	03.31
6.	"Me Ahasa Pura" (Album Version)	04.10
7.	"Moduwela" (Album Version)	03.51
8.	"Obe Susum" (Album Version)	03.02
9.	"Oben Athata" (Album Version)	03.50
10.	"Sandun Aranaka" (Album Version)	03.55
11.	"Sanda Kalum Dena" (Album Version)	04.06
12.	"Sigiriye Kurutu Geetha" (Album Version)	03.49
13.	"Tharu Se Netha" (Album Version)	04.01
14.	"Wairodiya" (Album Version)	03.26
15.	"Vilanda Kewu" (Album Version)	03.43
