= Tharanga Goonetilleke =

American opera singer

- Born: March 1981 (age 45); Badulla, Sri Lanka
- Occupation: Soprano opera singer
- Years active: 1998–present
- Website: Official website

Tharanga Goonetilleke (born March 1981) is a soprano opera singer who was born in Badulla, Sri Lanka, but grew up in Ratmalana. Her singing ability was noticed by a music professor from Converse College while he was visiting Sri Lanka. She is the first woman from Sri Lanka to attend the Juilliard School, one of the world's leading music schools. She lives in New York City, and her career in opera has received international attention.

== Education ==
Goonetilleke began learning to sing in Sri Lanka at the age of 12 under the training of Christine Perera. She began attending Converse College in South Carolina in 2001 and graduated in 2005 with Bachelor of Music degree in Vocal Performance and a minor in biology.

Representing South Carolina, she entered the Metropolitan Opera National Council Auditions and won. Impressed by Goonetilleke's performance, the judges, who happened to be from the Juilliard School, asked her whether she had considered attending graduate school. Consequently, she decided to apply for admission to Juilliard, and in 2005, she was the first Sri Lankan woman to be admitted to the Juilliard School and was provided a full tuition scholarship. Her living expenses were covered by President's Fund of Sri Lanka. She graduated from Juilliard with a Master of Music in Voice and Opera.

== Career ==
In 1998, Goonetilleke made her singing debut with the Symphony Orchestra of Sri Lanka (SOSL), after winning the SOSL concerto vocal competition in 1998. In 2010, she became a member of New York City Opera, and has since performed in numerous operas such as Il trittico, Dialogues of the Carmelites, La bohème, Die Zauberflöte, Iphigénie en Aulide, and Ariodante. She has also performed in concerts in the United States, Europe, India, and South Korea. Her 2011 concert tour in India was considered "timely" by the Sri Lankan High Commission in India since it helped foster a cultural dialogue between the two countries.

== Personal life ==
Goonetilleke grew up in Ratmalana, Sri Lanka, near the capital Colombo. She first became interested in opera when she was thirteen when she heard soprano Kiri Te Kanawa sing. However, she did not think at that time that opera was a career option. A music professor from Converse College, Douglas Weeks, was visiting Sri Lanka and heard her sing; he subsequently arranged for her admission to the college. She had planned to study medical science in Sri Lanka, but to her surprise, when her father found out about the offer for her to attend Converse College, he thought it was a good idea.

Her younger sister Eranga also attended Converse College and afterward obtained her master's degree in Opera and Musical Theater from Southern Illinois University; she is currently a faculty member at Converse College's Lawson Academy of the Arts. Goonetilleke is married, has a daughter, and lives in New York City.
