= Vivienne de Silva Boralessa =

Vivienne De Silva Boralessa
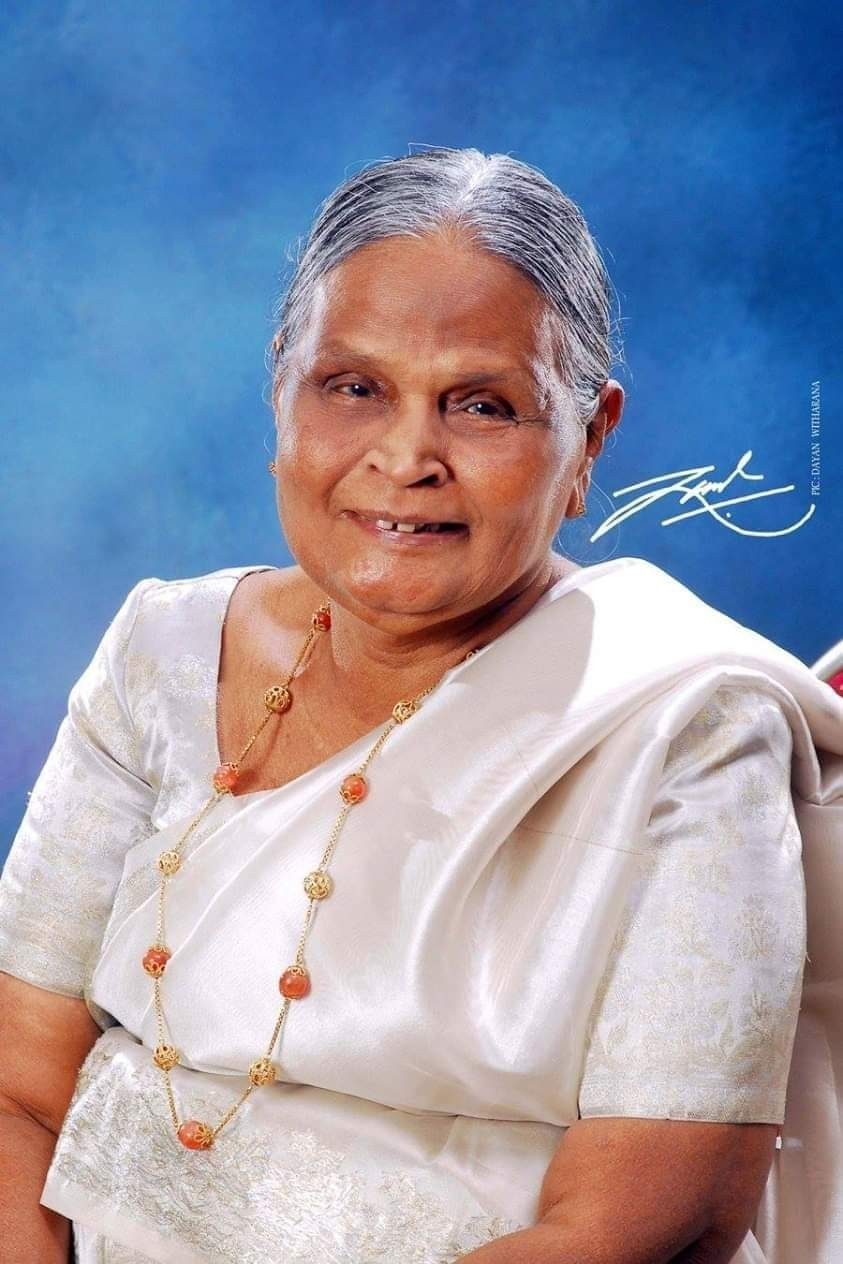
- Vivienne, © 2016
- Born: Vivienne De Silva; 24 November 1930; British Ceylon
- Died: 2 April 2017 (aged 86); Sri Lanka
- Burial place: Borella Kanatte Cemetery
- Education: Maradana Madhya Maha Vidyalaya
- Occupation: Singer
- Years active: 1938-2017
- Spouse: C.D.S. Boralessa
- Children: Udaya, Ajith, Indrani, Devapriya, Kapila, Madhavi
- Parent: G.F.D. Silva · Dona Leela Sahabandu
- Awards: Kalabooshana Award and More
- Musical career
- Genres: Sinhala pop music · Buddhist Music · easy listening
- Instrument: Vocals
- Labels: His Master's Voice; Radio Ceylon

Vivienne De Silva Boralessa (Sinhala: විවියන් ද සිල්වා බොරලැස්ස) (24 November 1930 – 2 April 2017) was a Sri Lankan singer. A legend and an icon of Sri Lankan Buddhist music, She is regarded as one of the most significant cultural figures of the 20th century. Started her music career at the age of 8 years old at Radio Ceylon in 1938. At 12 years old she was signed to His Master's Voice, in what is known as Sri Lanka's 'gramophone era'.

Born to a family with close ties to the Ceylonese arts industry, Vivienne De Silva began her musical career at the age of only 8 years old, Her first public performance took place in 1938, when she sang welcome songs for performances of two of her father's plays: The Sad State of Lanka and Election Echo, gaining the attention of her uncle, G.R. Edward, in the audience. Edward then convinced Boralessa's parents to allow him to perform a duet with her on Radio Ceylon later that year; she successfully auditioned for Radio Ceylon in 1940, before a panel consisting of Gunapala Malalasekera, S.L.B. Kapukotuwa, and B.S. Wijeyratne, becoming part of their in-house roster of live singers. She soon became one of the most popular radio and gramophone singer in Sri Lanka.

Vivienne De Silva was a royalty singer of His Master's Voice company, and became one of few artist under His Master's Voice to presented gramophone records with the full ownership of the artist music catalog for the company.

Vivienne De Silva Boralessa was the only artist to perform at the 2500th- (1956) and 2550th (2006) Buddha Jayanti as well as the 2600th (2011) Sambuddhatva Jayanthi celebrations held in Sri Lanka; she performed "Me pin bime" ("On this hallowed ground"), a song written for the occasion, in a duet alongside her son, Kapila at the latter occasion. She was also awarded the Kalabooshana award by the Sri Lankan Government for her services to the country's music industry.

Some of Vivienne's more well-known songs include:

- Dura Penena Thanithala (Far-seen plains)
- Nangi Nangi Rupika (Sister Rupika)
- Nawathinna Tissa (Tissa, desist)
- Sambudu Mangalle (Blessed (Buddhist) festival)
- Budu Magula Langama Awi (The Buddhist festival draws near)
- Ma Sanghabodhi Swamine (My Lord Sanghabodhi)

While most of Boralessa's work was recorded on gramophone, she released a CD-based album containing her most popular tracks, entitled Sambudu Mangalle, in 2009, under Humali Records (formerly named K.B. Records) founded by her youngest son Kapila Boralessa.

== Early life ==
Vivienne De Silva was born in 1930 to G.F. de Silva (owner/managing director of Safety Tours; a former manager at the De Zoysa Company and surveyor at the Ceylon Chamber of Commerce) and D.L. Sahabandu, in British Ceylon.

An only child, Boralessa grew up in a family with close ties to the Ceylonese arts industry, primarily due to her father G.F. de Silva's work as a playwright and producer, and his patronage of the arts in general. Her first public performance took place in 1938, when she sang welcome songs for performances of two of her father's plays: The Sad State of Lanka and Election Echo, gaining the attention of her uncle, G.R. Edward, in the audience. Edward then convinced Boralessa's parents to allow him to perform a duet with her on Radio Ceylon later that year; she successfully auditioned for Radio Ceylon in 1940, before a panel consisting of Gunapala Malalasekera, S.L.B. Kapukotuwa, and B.S. Wijeyratne, becoming part of their in-house roster of live singers.

As a child singer at Radio Ceylon, Boralessa would initially sing simpler songs, performing live with radio orchestras sourced by her father, quickly being promoted to an A-grade artist in late 1940. Her first solo song was Chandra de piya. By the mid-1940s, Boralessa was a fairly well-known artist, and had caught the attention of a number of more senior members of the local music industry - one of whom was Sunil Shantha, who visited Boralessa's home in 1946 to invite her to perform with him. Boralessa and her family accepted the offer, leading to the release of Ralle Nagenne that same year.

== Career ==
The release of Ralle Nagenne is regarded to have been the turning point in Boralessa's career, the association with an artist like Shantha contributing considerably. Inspired by artists such as Wasantha Senanayake, Vincent de Paul Peiris, Susil Premarathna, Grace Sahabandu, Priscilla Opatha, C.T. Fernando, Kanthi Wakwella and Mohideen Baig, she would go on to perform both solo songs (mostly devotional - and patriotic music) and duets with notable artists such as H.R. Jothipala, Haroon Lanthra, Dharmadasa Walpola and Sisira Senarathne, and eventually with her idol C.T.

Boralessa expressed a desire to enter the playback music industry, but could not visit India for recording due to objections by her parents. Nevertheless, the early 1950s saw Vivienne enter the peak of her popularity, under the guidance and training of musicologists and composers such as H.W. Rupasinghe ("Rupasinghe master"), Lionel Edirisinghe and Eddie master. Notable songwriters that contributed to her career during this (and later) periods include:

- Sarath Wimalaweera
- Karunaratne Abeysekera
- Dharmadasa Dias
- Premakeerthi de Alwis
- C. Weerasekara
- Dayananda Kumarasiri
- Wasanthasiri Kusumpola
- Rangajeewa Salgado

Boralessa's work was scored by some of Sri Lanka's most well-known composers, with B.S. Perera, Victor Perera, Premasiri Khemadasa, Sanath Nandasiri and Clarence Wijewardena among them. Boralessa was also signed on to the His Master's Voice label (then under the local oversight of Cargills (Ceylon)) by Gabrielle Gunaratne in 1950.

Some of Vivienne's more well-known songs include:

- Dura Penena Thanithala (Far-seen plains)
- Nangi nangi Rupika (Sister Rupika)
- Nawathinna Tissa (Tissa, desist)
- Sambudu mangalle (Blessed (Buddhist) festival)
- Budu magula langama ewi (The Buddhist festival draws near)
- Ma Sanghabodhi swamine (My Lord Sanghabodhi)

While most of Boralessa's work was recorded on gramophone, she released a CD-based album containing her most popular tracks, entitled Sambudu Mangalle, in 2009.

De Silva-Boralessa was the only artist to perform at the 2500th- (1955) and 2550th (2006) Buddha Jayanti as well as the 2600th (2011) Sambuddhatva Jayanthi celebrations held in Sri Lanka; she performed "Me pin bime" ("On this hallowed ground"), a song written for the occasion, in a duet alongside her son, Kapila at the latter occasion. She was also awarded the Kalabooshana award by the Sri Lankan Government for her services to the country's music industry.

== Personal life ==
Vivienne de Silva-Boralessa married C.D.S. Boralessa (died. 11 March 2013) in 1953 at the Galle Face Hotel in Colombo. The two met at the wedding of Vivienne Boralessa's uncle G.R. Edward, where Boralessa had approached her as a fan of her work. They had six children- Udaya, Ajith, Indrani, Devapriya, Kapila and Madhavi. Kapila Boralessa is himself a member of the Sri Lankan music scene and, along with his sister Indrani, holds the rights to their mother's estate.

Vivienne de Silva-Boralessa died on 2 April 2017 at the Sri Jayawardenepura General Hospital after a brief period of illness.

== See also ==
- Music of Sri Lanka
- Buddhism in Sri Lanka
