= The Gypsies (Sri Lankan band) =

Sri lankan legendary baila-band

- Origin: Rathmalana, Sri Lanka
- Genre: Baila
- Years active: 1969–present
- Labels: Torana, AirXone
- Members: Piyal Perera; Ranuka Prabhath; Ravi Terrence; Laksiri Ranga; Lal Witiwala; Shenal Nishshanka; Jonathan Jesudason; Joshua Jayathilaka; Dangamuwage Rusiru Dilshan (Shan)
- Past members: Sunil Perera (deceased); Corrine Almeida; Monique Wille; Sharon Nesaduray; Ginger (Judith White); Dileepa Mangala (Rathuu); Ronnie Leitch (deceased); Ranil Vas
- Website: www.gypsies.lk

The Gypsies are a Sri Lankan baila band that performs Sinhala and English songs. The band was founded in the early 1970s and has since garnered a huge fan base across Sri Lanka and is one of Sri Lanka's most famous bands. They are a highly paid band in Sri Lanka, as they constantly perform at parties, dances and at many concerts.

The band was once banned by the Government of Sri Lanka due to many of its songs carrying antigovernmental sentiments.

== History ==
The band was formed in 1970 by Anton Perera, father of lead singer Sunil Perera and a confectioner working for the Glucorasa company. The band composed of his five sons- Sunil, Nihal, Piyal, Nimal and Lal- all of whom had recently completed high school. Anton Perera renovated a portion of his house on Galle Road (in Rathmalana) into a recording studio and the band began recording their first album.

Initially, the band only performed western music, but after a few years, the band began to perform Sinhala songs as well, and eventually the band members began composing their own Sinhala music. The first Sinhala songs released by the Gypsies, Linda Langa Sangamaya and Amma Amma, were released in 1973.

In the thirty years that followed, many changes have occurred in the group's membership that have led to the eight members present today. As of today, Piyal Perera is the only living member from the original line up.

The early success of the Gypsies was thanks to a series of 5 albums released by the band in the late 1970s (entitled Dance With the Gypsies). In the 1980s the group released their first audio cassette containing their novelty hit Kurumitto (Dwarfs), which was a translated cover of Dutch musician Father Abraham's The Smurf Song. With the arrival of CDs in Sri Lanka, the Gypsies released their first CD Gypsies Gold containing 17 songs, and following its success, the band released two more CDs, Dance With the Gypsies and Signore, which were also well received by fans.

The Gypsies have since released many other records and continue to enjoy success. Sunil Perera and the Gypsies were world-famous for their baila music. The Gypsies have also collaborated with other Sri Lankan stars like Desmond De Silva, and are credited for composing the first ever baila non-stop medley.

Their first performance outside of Sri Lanka, in Delhi, as the resident band of the Delhi Taj Hotel for three months, was followed by many more tours in other foreign countries, where many members of the Sri Lankan diaspora reside, such as the United Kingdom, Singapore, United States, New Zealand, Australia and Canada.

Corrine Almeida, the long-standing female vocalist of the group, and Sharon Nesaduray, better known as "Lulu", eventually left the group. followed by Radhika Rajavellu after the departure of female vocalist Ginger (Judith White). Their last female singer, Monique Wille (Ex-Ultimate) also exited in November 2024 after 11 years of working with the Gypsies

Buongiorno was released in 2018, which was the first hit song to be released under Gypsies label after a period of four years.

On 6 August 2021, Sunil Perera tested positive for COVID-19, and was put on oxygen after experiencing breathing difficulties. Rumors of Perera's death began circulating on social media. In spite of his treatment, on 5 September, Perera was re-admitted to the hospital due to pneumonia and died in the early hours of 6 September 2021, one week before his 69th birthday.

The Gypsies celebrated its Golden Jubilee amidst the COVID-19 pandemic in 2021 by arranging several virtual concerts, to commemorate 50 years since the band's formation.

== Members ==
=== Current ===
- Piyal Perera – percussion, vocals
- Lal Witiwalla – drums
- Laksiri Ranga – bass guitar
- Ranuka Prabhath – lead guitar
- Shenal Nishshanka - vocals, rhythm guitar
- Ravi Terrence – keyboards
- Inoch Jonathan – Sound Engineer
- Joshua Jayathilaka - manager
- Rusiru Dilshan (Shan) - music business & social media counselor, manager

=== Former ===
- Sunil Perera – lead vocals (1970–2021)
- Monique Wille - Vocals (2013 - 2024)
- Dushan Jayathilake - keyboards. vocals
- Shezry Shirajudeen - bass guitar
- Nalin Samath - vocals, rhythm guitar
- Ranil Vas – lead guitar, vocals
- Kamal Perera - lead guitar
- Corrine Almeida – vocals
- Sharon Nesaduray – vocals
- Ginger (Judith White) – vocals
- Dileepa Mangala – Keyboards
- Ronnie Leitch – vocals

== Discography ==
- The Beginning
- Signore
- Gold
- Piti Kotapan None
- Dance With The Gypsies
- This Land Belongs To You
- Oye Ojaye
- Lankawe Ape Lankawe
- Kurumitto
- Lunu Dehi
- I Don't Know Why
- Lassana Lokaye
