= Anil Mihiripenna =

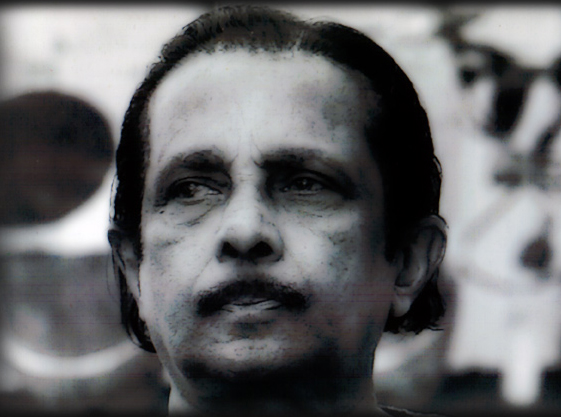
- Shashthrapathi Anil Mihiripenna

Background information
- Born: Siril Mihiripenna; 10 August 1933; Sri Lanka
- Died: 10 June 2017 (aged 83)
- Genres: Hindustani Classical Music, Film Score
- Occupations: Musician, flutist, composer
- Instruments: Bansuri, Esraj
- Labels: Sangeeth Bhawana, Saratha Sankalana

Shashthrapathi Anil Mihiripenna (10 August 1933 – 10 June 2017) was a Sri Lankan classical musician, who played the Bansuri, Esraj and Indian bamboo flute. He played in the North Indian tradition and was the first Sri Lankan to obtain degrees in both flute and esraj. Running his Sharadha Kala Niketanaya, he endeavoured to teach, develop and popularise Indian classical music in Sri Lanka for the last forty years.

== Career ==
He graduated from the Visva-Bharati University India, better known as Santiniketan. He was one of the most talented oriental musicians who played the Flute and the Esraj. He studied under the great Esraj Maestros Ashish Chandra Benerji, Flute from Pandit Gowr Goswamy and Vocals from Pandit Jamini Kantha Chakrawarthi. He was conferred with Master of Arts (Musicology) by the Open International University (U.S.A.) in May 2004.

He has widely traveled on concert tours in the United States of America, Hong Kong, Taiwan, Singapore and several times in India. He was highly regarded as the leading Flutist cum Esraj player in Sri Lanka who could charm anyone with a musical ear.

He has composed music for several ballets, documentary films and feature films. He was a super grade artist at the Sri Lanka Broadcasting and Rupavahini Corporations. They have acknowledged him as an International artist.

He was a visiting lecturer at the University of Kelaniya. He is the founder of Sharada Kala Nikethanaya, an institution that propagates and popularizes Oriental classical music in Sri Lanka. The board of directors and the publication board of the American Biography Institute appointed him as an honorary member of their research board of advisors in 1999.

He was conferred with honorary citizenship by governor of Nebraska State of U.S.A.

The haunting notes that emanated from his flute bore the ample testimony to his talents and experience in his chosen field. His compositions are played throughout the Island by his pupils.

- 1955 – Joined Vishva Bharathi University (Santiniketan) India Studied Flute, Esraj & Vocal.
- 1959 – Graduated from the University First appointment as a Music teacher in the Department of Education.
- 1960 – First appointment as a Music teacher in the Department of Education.
- 1969 – Appointed as a lecturer of music at Govt. College of music.
- 1972 – Appointed as a visiting lecturer at the University of Kelaniya.
- 1974 – Appointed as a lecturer at the Institute of Aesthetic studies.

== Personal life ==
Anil was married to Mrs. Soma Mihiripenna

== Performance ==
- 1960 Selected by an audition, as a super grade artist on Flute & Esraj
- 1961 Started public performances at Lionel Wendt auditorium which was titled as "ABHIRANGA"
- 1964 Initiated series of programmes for intellectual audience
- 1967 The first Oriental Hevisi Band was formed for Ananda College, Colombo
- 1972 Lecture demonstration was held at Ananda College, Colombo
- 1973 Formed first Hevisi band at St. Lawrence's Convent, Colombo
- 1974 Performed for the University students at Horana

== Foreign Tours ==
- 1997 : Invited by following four American Universities

University of Nebraska University of Wesleyan University of Creighton University of Omaha Recorded several programmes to introduce Flute, Esraj, Sitar and Violin for Educational Television Council for Higher Education on oriental music

- 1978 : Invited to perform at Indira Kala University (M.P) India
- 1983 : Invited to perform at Indira Kala University (M.P) India
- 1987 : Taken part in 5th Aspect International Art Festival in Hong Kong & Taiwan
- 1996 : Performed at Benaris Hindu University
- 1999 : Performed at Delhi University
- 2000 : Visited Vishva Bharati University (Shanthinikethan) in the capacity of president Tagore society and performed Flute & Esraj
- 2001 : Performed at Bhatkhande Music University 75th Jayanthi Mahotsava Festival

== Compositions ==
- 1978 : Composition titled "Peacock Dance" was performed by Nebraska Symphony Orchestra ( U.S.A. )
- 1980 & 1997 : Same composition was played at Colombo Symphony Orchestra
- 1985 to 1987 : Composed and directed combined orchestra for Sri Lanka Broadcasting Corporation
- 1985 : Composed and directed opening and closing theme for STX, S.L.B.C

== Ballet Music ==
- 1960 : Ranketiputha
- 1962 : Chandalika
- 1970 : Sebaliya
- 1975 : Omarilatha
- 1976 : Bilipuja
- 1977 : Mother
- 1983 : Snake & Eagle for French Ballet Master
- 1983 : Selalihini Sandesaya
- 1994 : Apeksha The musical score was adjudged as the best music for the year

== Documentary and Featured films ==
- 1984 The Mahaweli feature film for American Embassy
- 1992 Paradise in tears for German Embassy
- 1995 Film Ninja Sri Lanka

== Books ==
- A collection of 'Gat' in the North Indian musical tradition
- Diffusion of Indian Music in Sri Lanka
- Instruments of the East and the West
- Vadya Sankalana (Sinhala)
- Elements of Hindustani Music

== CDs ==
- Sangeeth Bhavana
- Saratha Sankalana

== Watch Live Shows ==
- Bhatiyali folk song
- Floating Flute Part 1
- Floating Flute Part 2
- Floating Flute Part 3
- Esraj
