= Sunil Perera =

Sri Lankan musician (1952–2021)

- Born: Uswatta Liyanage Ivor Sylvester Sunil Perera; 14 September 1952; Narahenpita, Ceylon
- Died: 6 September 2021 (aged 68); Colombo, Sri Lanka
- Education: St. Sebastian's College; St. Peter's College
- Occupation: Musician
- Spouse: Geetha Perera (née Kulatunga) (m. 1981)
- Children: 4
- Musical career
- Genres: Pop; soul; rhythm and blues; Baila; Western Cha-Cha; rock; hip hop; reggae
- Instruments: Vocals, Bass guitar
- Years active: 1969–2021
- Labels: Gypsy Enterprises, Torana
- Formerly of: The Gypsies

Uswatta Liyanage Ivor Sylvester Sunil Perera (Sinhala: සුනිල් පෙරේරා; 14 September 1952 – 6 September 2021) was a Sri Lankan vocalist, guitarist, songwriter and composer. Described as one of the most influential musicians in Sri Lankan music history, Perera was the leader and the lead vocalist of The Gypsies. He was associated with Sri Lanka's baila genre, and gained the nickname "Baila Cakrawarti".

== Personal life ==
Perera was born on 14 September 1952, in a family with ten siblings. His father, Anton Perera, was in the military before becoming a musician and forming the original Gypsies band. Anton was a clerk at the government Postal Department and also run a sweet production company called "Glucorasa". His mother was Dorine Perera. He started his education at St. Sebastian's College, Moratuwa until grade four and then until finishing school in the St Peter's College, Colombo. During his school days he was also a member of the college band. When he was 11 years old, he became a guitarist.

Perera was married to Geetha Perera (née Kulatunga) who was born on 18 March 1967, whom he met while she was studying for her O/L classes. She also meets Sunil while he is attending a concert. Kulatunga's father, Mahinda, is a sub-inspector with the Sri Lanka Police. On 25 October 1981, Perera was arrested by police in Homagama following reports from Kulatunga's parents that he had abducted her; the case was later dropped. When Kulatunga was aged 16, she and Perera got engaged.

He had two sons: Sajith and Gayan, and two daughters: Rehana and Maneesha. Eldest son Sajith is married to the daughter of famous singer Dalreen Suby. His younger son, Gayan is a musician who formed the band "Daddy". His nephew, Lanthra Perera is also a musician and the founder-member of the band "Doctor".

=== Death ===
In August 2021, Perera tested positive for COVID-19 and rumors of his death started circulating on social media. In spite of treatment, on 5 September, he was re-admitted to hospital due to pneumonia and died in the early hours of 6 September 2021, at age 68.

== Musical career ==
At the age of 11, he started to play guitar. His father initially expected him to pursue his higher studies and then to make him a professional doctor. However, he was not able to pursue his higher education due to inadequate results in GCE O/L examinations. His father made arrangements for Sunil to do GCE O/L examination privately, but Sunil again could not produce expected results in order to further continue his studies. Sunil later conveyed his interest in music to his father. In 1969, at the age of 15 when he left school, Sunil joined the band The Gypsies created by his father, Anton Perera, along with his brothers – Nihal, Lal, Nimal, Piyal and uncle's son Neville; there were seven of the crew in all. He learned guitar under Vincent Jayawardane and George Ferdinando and had voice training under Loren Abeysekara, Lily Godridge and Maryanne David.

Later, The Gypsies group consisted of his own brothers and cousins. Accordingly, Nihal, Lal, Nimal and Piyal formed a group of seven including two cousins. Sunil was the main vocalist of the band, along with his brother Piyal Perera. His father also built a studio for the band next to the house on Galle Road in Ratmalana where they were staying at the time. In the '70s, they released nearly 5 albums titled 'Dance with Gypsies'. Their first hit "Linda Langa Sangamaya" was released in 1972/1973 along with "Amma Amma Me Mata". In the mid-1970s, his other brothers left the band and got involved in business activities. In 1980, the Gypsies released the first cassette with the song "Kurumitto". Other tracks sung by Gypsies include, "Kadapathakin", "None Mage Sudu None" (1977), "Lunu Dehi" (1987), "Uncle Johnson" (1987), "Oye Ojaye" (1989), "Piti Kotapan None" and "Signore" (1997). Their song 'Lunu Dehi' released in 1987 was a song that made an amazing difference on the concert stage in the country. In the year 1997, they changed the course of the music field with the song "Piti Kotapan None".

Sunil's recent works, such as "I Don't Know Why" address sociopolitical issues through humor. However, several of his songs have been banned by the state media due to their criticisms of the government. In 2017, he released the song "Koththamalli". He also sang and released "Buongiorno" in 2018, which was the first hit song to be released under the Gypsies label after a gap of four years. In 2019, he sang the song "Diyawannawe Inna" for the film Jaya Sri Amathithuma.

The band The Gypsies celebrated their Golden Jubilee in 2021 by arranging a concert via virtual platforms.

== Ideology ==
Sunil Perera recently came up with his own ideology about the sociopolitical situation in the country. He was highly critical of Sri Lankan society and politics. He openly talked about sensitive topics, such as sex, which are often deemed as taboo subjects in conservative Sri Lanka. He was also a vocal critic of the administration of Gotabaya Rajapaksa and Mahinda Rajapaksa over the years. In 2015, he revealed that he was afraid of being a target of the Rajapaksa family when Mahinda Rajapakse lost the 2015 Sri Lankan presidential election.

In January 2017, Sunil went to the Department of Inland Revenue and insisted that he should pay income tax. Earlier, he had been paying tax for his income as a member of the music group only.

== Filmography ==
| Year | Film | Roles | Ref. |
|---|---|---|---|
| 1989 | Shakthiya Obai Amme | Playback Singer | |
| 1995 | Chitti | Playback Singer | |
| 2001 | Mahadena Muththai Golayo Roththai | Playback Singer | |
| 2001 | Hai Hui Babi Achchi | Playback Singer; Bele Kade Saima 'Kapirimudukuwe Gotaimbre' | |
| 2002 | Bahubuthayo | Playback Singer | |
| 2005 | One Shot | Playback Singer; Minister Pushpakumara | |
| 2007 | Sikuru Hathe | Playback Singer | |
| 2008 | Wada Bari Tarzan Mathisabayata | Playback Singer | |
| 2009 | Leader | Playback Singer, Lyricist | |
| 2011 | King Hunther | Playback Singer | |
| 2013 | Peeter One | Himself, cameo role | |
| 2014 | Ko Mark No Mark | Playback Singer | |
| 2019 | Jaya Sri Amathithuma | Composer, Playback Singer | |
| 2023 | Gajaman | Magodisthuma (Voice) | |

== Discography ==
=== Ma Nowana Mama ===
"Ma Nowana Mama (Acoustic Version)" included songs
| No. | Title | Length |
|---|---|---|
| 1. | "Olu Pipeela" (Acoustic Version) |
| 2. | "Podi Kurullane" (Acoustic Version) |
| 3. | "Lowe Sama" (Acoustic Version) |
| 4. | "Rasa Ahara Kawala" (Acoustic Version) |
| 5. | "Ratak Watinawa" (Acoustic Version) |
| 6. | "Saima Cut Wela" (Acoustic Version) |

=== Dance With The Gypsies Vol. 1 ===
"Dance With The Gypsies Vol. 1" included songs
| No. | Title | Length |
|---|---|---|
| 1. | "One Way Wind" (Album Version) |
| 2. | "Russian Lady" (Album Version) |
| 3. | "You Are The Reason Why" (Album Version) |
| 4. | "Last Farewell" (Album Version) |
| 5. | "We Love To Boogie" (Album Version) |
| 6. | "I Am A Cider Drinker" (Album Version) |
| 7. | "Blue Danube" (Farewell song for cricketer's retirement) |
| 8. | "Lying In The Arms of Mary" (Album Version) |
| 9. | "You, You, You" (Album Version) |
| 10. | "Life Is Too Short Girl" (Album Version) |
| 11. | "Ramaya" (Album Version) |
| 12. | "She Went Into The Water" (Album Version) |
| 13. | "Oma Misste Missisthe" (Album Version) |
| 14. | "Ring Ring" (Album Version) |

=== Dance With The Gypsies Vol. 3 ===
"Dance With The Gypsies Vol. 3" included songs
| No. | Title | Length |
|---|---|---|
| 1. | "No Woman No Cry" (Album Version) |
| 2. | "Heart-ache" (Album Version) |
| 3. | "Brown Girl In The Ring" (Album Version) |
| 4. | "Boogie Shoes" (Album Version) |
| 5. | "Blue Suade Shoes" (Album Version) |
| 6. | "Second-hand News" (Album Version) |
| 7. | "Staying Alive" (Album Version) |
| 8. | "In The Mood" (Album Version) |
| 9. | "Night Fever" (Album Version) |
| 10. | "Mull Of Kintyre" (Album Version) |
| 11. | "Three Times A Lady" (Album Version) |
| 12. | "Rivers Of Babylon" (Album Version) |
| 13. | "Funky Horn" (Album Version) |

=== Signore ===
"Signore" included songs
| No. | Title | Length |
|---|---|---|
| 1. | "Signore" (Album Version) |
| 2. | "Piti Kotapan None" (Album Version) |
| 3. | "Kasade" (Album Version) |
| 4. | "Lorenzo" (Album Version) |
| 5. | "Latha No Katha" (Album Version) |
| 6. | "Dili Dili" (Album Version) |
| 7. | "Oba Lassanai" (Album Version) |
| 8. | "Wayasata Yanawa" (Album Version) |
| 9. | "Kedapathi" (Album Version) |
| 10. | "Obe Rasa Katha" (Album Version) |
| 11. | "Thaththa Mata Anapu" (Album Version) |
| 12. | "Vaadiya" (Album Version) |
| 13. | "Lassana Sahakara" (Album Version) |
| 14. | "Sal Mal Wal Onchili" (Album Version) |
| 15. | "Divya Anganawo" (Album Version) |
| 16. | "Podi Kurullane" (Album Version) |
| 17. | "Lassana Hasarel" (Album Version) |

=== Dance With The Gypsies Vol. 5 ===
"Dance With The Gypsies Vol. 5" included songs
| No. | Title | Length |
|---|---|---|
| 1. | "Trinidad" (Album Version) |
| 2. | "Funky Town" (Album Version) |
| 3. | "Coming Up" (Album Version) |
| 4. | "More Than I Can Say" (Album Version) |
| 5. | "Rest Your Love On Me" (Album Version) |
| 6. | "Rock Around The Clock" (Album Version) |
| 7. | "Anniversary Waltz" (Album Version) |
| 8. | "Breakfast In America" (Album Version) |
| 9. | "American Dream" (Album Version) |
| 10. | "It's Still Rock & Roll To Me" (Album Version) |
| 11. | "Another Brick In The Wall" (Album Version) |
| 12. | "Kurumitto" (Album Version) |

=== Gypsies Gold ===
"Gypsies Gold" included songs
| No. | Title | Length |
|---|---|---|
| 1. | "Ojaye" (Album Version (with Piyal Perera, Rookantha Gunathilake)) |
| 2. | "Sima Cutwela" (Album Version (with Roshan)) |
| 3. | "Lunu Dehi" (Album Version (with Piyal Perera)) |
| 4. | "Uncle Johnson" (Album Version) |
| 5. | "Vaduwa" (Album Version (with Piyal Perera)) |
| 6. | "Ay Ayio" (Album Version (with Mariazelle Gunathilake)) |
| 7. | "Sada Radenne" (Album Version (with Piyal Perera)) |
| 8. | "Adare Soya" (Album Version (sung by Piyal Perera)) |
| 9. | "Amatheka Karannepa" (Album Version (sung by Sanjeewani and Piyal Perera)) |
| 10. | "Pem Suwe" (Album Version (sung by Piyal Perera)) |
| 11. | "Lowe Sama" (Album Version) |
| 12. | "Our Land" (Album Version) |
| 13. | "Birthday Song" (Album Version (sung by Piyal Perera)) |
| 14. | "Wine Women & Song" (Album Version (with Manilal)) |
| 15. | "You're The Best" (Album Version (sung by K. Nimal)) |
| 16. | "Yaluwo - Friends" (Album Version (with Mervin)) |
| 17. | "Thattaya - Baldi" (Album Version (sung by Ronnie Leitch)) |

=== Koththamalli ===
"Koththamalli" included songs
| No. | Title | Length |
|---|---|---|
| 1. | "Apita Kiyanna" (Album Version) |
| 2. | "Koththamalli" (Album Version) |
| 3. | "Sundarai Adare" (Album Version) |
| 4. | "Adareta Adarewela" (Album Version) |
| 5. | "Koththamalli (Reprise)" (Album Version) |
| 6. | "Upandine Udawela" (Album Version) |
| 7. | "Mahela Jayawardene Tribute" (Farewell song for cricketer's retirement) |
| 8. | "Is This A Dream" (Album Version) |
| 9. | "Grandma We Love You" (Album Version) |
