= Namal Udugama =

Sri Lankan singer

Namal Udugama නාමල් උඩුගම
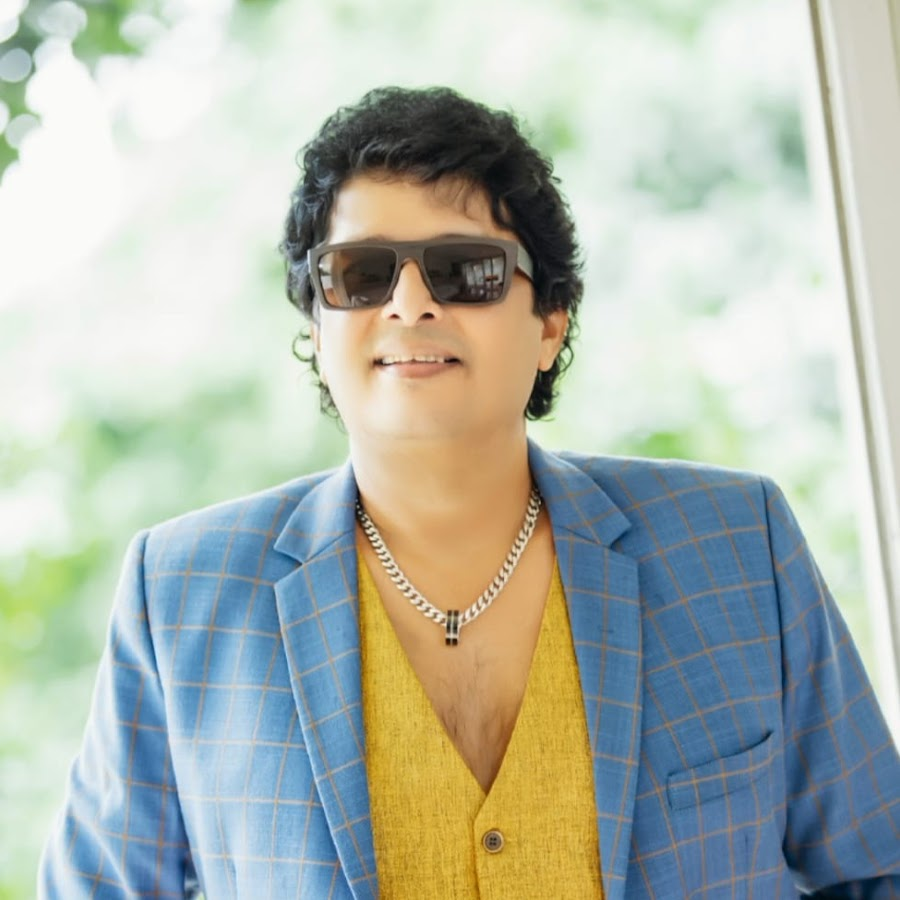
- Born: Prasanna Namal Udugama; October 21, 1967 (age 58); Thalathuoya, Kandy, Sri Lanka
- Education: Thalathuoya National School, Kandy
- Occupations: Singer; dancer
- Spouse: Ruwanthi Mangala
- Children: Dehemi, Nomitha
- Musical career
- Genres: Pop; soul; rhythm and blues; Indian classical music
- Instruments: Vocals, guitar
- Years active: 1990–present
- Label: CEYMUSIC

Prasanna Namal Udugama (born October 21, 1967 නාමල් උඩුගම) is a Sri Lankan singer, composer and songwriter. One of the most popular artists in Sri Lanka, before the era of reality shows, he is regarded as a symbolic icon in modern Sri Lankan music industry. In the 1990s, he was hailed as the prince of dreams(සිහින කුමාරයා) among the youth. The health issues in 2014 made him to slow his singing career. Udugama recovered well from a successful liver transplant in mid-2015.

== Early life and career ==
Udugama's father is a businessman and his mother is a housewife. He has two brothers and two sisters. He is the youngest in the family. Namal was educated at Hewahata Central college in Kandy. At school, he played guitar and performed at school events, before joining a band in Kandy. Udugama moved to Colombo, where he began to release albums. He composed and performed the song "Samuganne Na Wenwanne Na"; the song established his career in the Sri Lankan music industry. Udugama is married to actress Ruwanthi Mangala, and they have one daughter, Dehemi and one son, Nomitha.

In February 2015, Udugama became severely ill due to a liver failure condition and admitted to the intensive care unit of a leading private hospital in Colombo. He was thereafter treated in Global City Hospital in India for the liver transplant. The surgery was done by Dr Gomathy Narasimhan, who is a Senior Consultant HPB & Liver Transplant Surgery at Global Health City, Chennai. He returned to Sri Lanka with a successful transplant on June 5, 2015. Before the surgery he released Sanda Aithiya song and after recovery, he released a solo hit Thamath Oya in 2015, which gathered crowd back towards him.

== Track listing ==
Samuganne Na 01 (Ra Sihine) album included songs
No.	Title	Length
1.	"Samuganne Na (His first song)" (Album Version)	04.48
2.	"Weedana Denne Na" (Album Version)	04.26
3.	"Lowama Nidana" (Album Version)	04.16
4.	"Oba Mula Wee" (Album Version)	03.47
5.	"Nisala Wela" (Album Version)	03.56
6.	"Sanasanna Ma" (Album Version)
7.	"Mal Wayase" (Album Version)	04.15
8.	"Pipuna Kusume" (Album Version)	03.45
9.	"Ra Sihine" (Album Version)
10.	"Sudu Rosa Mal Watila Thibuna" (Album Version)

Thani Unada album included songs
No.	Title	Length
1.	"Ma Muwa Agin" (Album Version)	04.48
2.	"Obe Lowe" (Album Version)	04.26
3.	"Pem Sisile" (Album Version)	04.16
4.	"Thani Vee" (Album Version)	03.47
5.	"Sudu Mal Sugandine" (Album Version)	03.56
6.	"Susumada Kusumaki" (Album Version)
7.	"Mal Wayase" (Album Version)	04.15
8.	"Thani Una Da" (Album Version)	03.45
9.	"Weedana Denne Na" (Album Version)

Samuganne Na 07 (Susumada Kandulaki) album included songs
No.	Title	Length
1.	"Handuva Sitha Maage" (Album Version)	04.48
2.	"Vedana Deneva" (Album Version)	04.26
3.	"Susumada Kusumaki" (Album Version)	04.16
4.	"Samugannam" (Album Version)	03.47
5.	"Rosa Male" (Album Version)	03.56
6.	"Kandulu Thurulu Kala" (Album Version)
7.	"Vile Nelum" (Album Version)	04.15
8.	"Suvanda Misak" (Album Version)	03.45
9.	"Andurak Andurin" (Album Version)
10.	"Samugena Yannata" (Album Version)
11.	"Apa Samugath Da" (Album Version)
12.	"Sihina Malehi" (Album Version)
13.	"Mama Muhudu Yaddi" (Album Version)
14.	"Rahane Rahane" (Album Version)

Wasarawasane album included songs
No.	Title	Length
1.	"Mawatha Pawena" (Album Version)	04.48
2.	"Nayana Yathra" (Album Version)	04.26
3.	"Kadadasi Rosa Mal" (Album Version)	04.16
4.	"Sanda Kimada Giye" (Album Version)	03.47
5.	"Wasarawasane" (Album Version)	03.56
6.	"Mahal Madure" (Album Version)

Namal Udugama WITH Sunflower 01 album included songs
No.	Title	Length
1.	"Apa hamuwi" (Album Version)	04.48
2.	"Meheniyaka" (Album Version)	04.26
3.	"Rathu rosa" (Album Version)	04.16
4.	"Samadara" (Album Version)	03.47
5.	"Sihinen sihinen" (Album Version)	03.56
6.	"Sithe susum" (Album Version)
7.	"Thaniwee" (Album Version)	04.15
8.	"Wedana" (Album Version)	03.45
9.	"Wessanthara biso" (Album Version)

Issara Senehasa album included songs
No.	Title	Length
1.	"Aadaren hadawatha" (Album Version)	04.48
2.	"Alu kobei kirillee" (Album Version)	04.26
3.	"Api aayemath" (Album Version)	04.16
4.	"Atheethaye laso gee" (Album Version)	03.47
5.	"Avaasanavata" (Album Version)	03.56
6.	"Issara senehasa" (Album Version)
7.	"Katha karana kandulu" (Album Version)	04.15
8.	"Kusuma obai" (Album Version)	03.45
9.	"Mage hitha thamath" (Album Version)
10.	"Mal milana wasanthaye" (Album Version)
11.	"Malak wage balannako" (Album Version)
12.	"Mayi mal mavathe" (Album Version)
13.	"Nuwara wewata" (Album Version)
14.	"Sara sande" (Album Version)
15.	"Sihina genena sanda saavi" (Album Version)
16.	"Sithul pavva" (Album Version)

== Solo tracks ==
Solo Tracks
No.	Title	Length
1.	"Hiru Sandu Wage."
2.	"Issara Senehasa."
3.	"Ithin Awasaray."
4.	"Kandula Witharay."
5.	"Katha Karana Kandhulu."
6.	"Kusuma Obai."
7.	"Lowama Nidana."
8.	"Ma Diha Ballanna."
9.	"Ma Muwa Agin."
10.	"Ma Thaniyen Yana."
11.	"Mage Hitha Thamaath."
12.	"Mage Hithe Thamath."
13.	"Mai Mal Mavathe."
14.	"Mal Dekak."
15.	"Mal Mal."
16.	"Mal Milana."
17.	"Mal Wayase."
18.	"Malak Wage."
19.	"Malloke Manamaliye."
20.	"Me Mal Paara Dige."
21.	"Meheniyaka Vee."
22.	"Nathrawa Raththaran."
23.	"Nisala Welaa Hada."
24.	"Nuwara Wewata."
25.	"Oba Mulaavee."
26.	"Obe Lowe Hada Ma."
27.	"Pem Sisile."
28.	"Pethum Mal."
29.	"Pipuna Ksume."
30.	"Ran Tharuka."
31.	"Rathu Rosa Mal."
32.	"Rea Sihinen."
33.	"Sadak Wela."
34.	"Samawenna Awaraye."
35.	"Samuganne Nea."
36.	"Samugena Yado."
37.	"Sanasanna Ma."
38.	"Sandakada Pahanak."
39.	"Sandakata Thanam."
40.	"Sandata Danenawada."
41.	"Sansara Mawathe."
42.	"Sara Sande."
43.	"Sihina Genena."
44.	"Sihinen Sihinen."
45.	"Sitha Padurak Se."
46.	"Sitha Sahas."
47.	"Sithe Susum Paaveelaa."
48.	"Sithul Pavuva."
49.	"Sudu Mal Sugandini."
50.	"Suwanda Kusume."
51.	"Thanivee."
52.	"Tharuwak Nethi."
53.	"Wedanaa Denne Nea."
54.	"Wedanaa Sihina."
55.	"Wessanthara Biso."
56.	"Aadaren."
57.	"Adare Bindi."
58.	"Adare Lan Lan."
59.	"Adaren."
60.	"Alu Kobei Kirilli."
61.	"Apa Hamuveema."
62.	"Api Aayemath."
63.	"Atheethaye Laso Gee."
64.	"Awasanawata."
65.	"Basayana Sanda."
66.	"Epa Ithin."
67.	"Hadawata Mage."
69.	"Malkumari Mage."
70.	"Susuman Kisida Nohelannam."
71.	"Sihinalathavi Oba Kimada Mulavee."
72.	"Sanda Ayithiya sanda sawunta"
73.	"Thamath Oya"
