= Desmond de Silva (singer) =

Sri Lankan singer (1969–2022)

- ඩෙස්මන්ඩ් ද සිල්වා
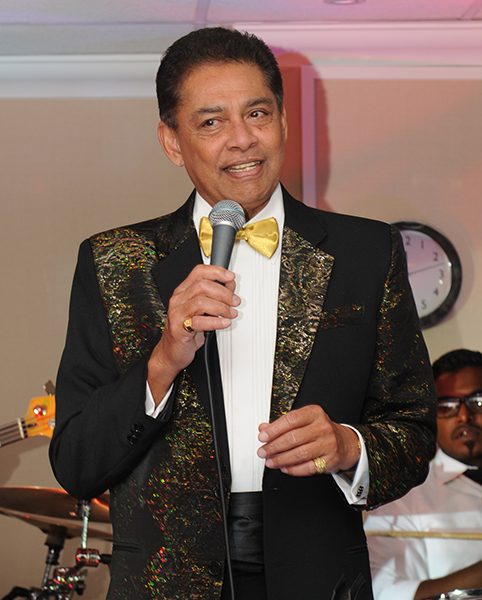
- De Silva in London, 2013
- Born: Desmond Anaclitus Rajiva de Silva; 13 July 1944; Matara, British Ceylon
- Died: 9 January 2022 (aged 77); Melbourne, Australia
- Education: St. Thomas' College, Matara
- Occupations: Singer; songwriter; musician
- Spouse: Phyllis Van Houten (m 2010); Deanna De Silva  Lilamani Wijeratne
- Children: 3
- Parents: Clement Arnold de Silva (father); Olga Correa (mother)
- Musical career
- Genres: Pop; soul; rhythm and blues; Baila
- Instrument: Vocals
- Years active: 1963–2011
- Labels: Nilwala; Ransilu; Evoke

Desmond Anaclitus Rajiva de Silva (ඩෙස්මන්ඩ් ද සිල්වා in [Sinhala]; 13 July 1944 – 9 January 2022), popularly known as Desmond de Silva, was a Sri Lankan singer, background musician and entertainer. Often regarded as the "King of Baila", he is noted for his youthful voice that was said to have changed little over four decades of performing.

== Early life ==
De Silva was born on 13 July 1944 in Matara, Sri Lanka as the eldest of the family with two siblings. His father Clement Arnold de Silva from Matara was a Public Health Inspector (PHI) and mother Olga Correa from Chilaw was a teacher. He had one younger brother (Milroy) and a younger sister (Varena). After moving to Bambalapitiya, he first went to St. Peter's College, Colombo. Then he was boarded at St. Aloysius College due to being stubborn. Later he was sent back to St. Peter's College and finally school life ended at St. Thomas' College, Matara. He did not go to high school and came to Colombo to join the Army. De Silva could not bear the hardships of military life, so he decided to leave. As a result, he left the Army and joined the Air Force. He left the army and became a soil digger at a bank construction site. At that time his daily wage was five rupees.

== Singing career ==
De Silva became a singer at the invitation of a friend. "Des", as he was known to his fans, launched his career in popular music in Colombo in 1963, he was the lead vocalist of the Fire-Flies. His music was featured widely on Radio Ceylon and subsequently the Sri Lanka Broadcasting Corporation, the oldest radio station in South Asia. De Silva also performed with leading Sri Lankan pop groups – "Spitfires", "Gabo and the Breakaways", and the "Jetliners." He sang a song titled 'Oba Nisa' with Mignonne Fernando and the Jetliners – it was hailed as a musical masterpiece at an international song festival. In 1976 he decided to form his own band, "Desmond and the Clan", which performed in various countries in Southeast Asia, including the Maldives. He also represented Sri Lanka at the 5th Olympiad of Songs in Athens, Greece in 1979 and became the champion and at the Yamaha Festival of Song in Tokyo, Japan.

He celebrated 53 years in show business, selling millions of CDs around the world. De Silva was known for his popular renditions of Sri Lankan 'baila' music, which was a style whose origins are in Portuguese and Spanish music. He had a string of baila hits including: Polkatu Hande, Chuda Manike, Mamma No, Miss Sri Lanka, Rajasangabo, Komali Pane as well as popular recordings of anonymous Baila songs. He was also known for a whole range of 'Party Time' non-stop Baila music. De Silva resided in London and performed with London-based backing group Foreign Affairs in the United Kingdom.

De Silva championed the cause of autism spectrum disorders: in August 2005 he was the first Sri Lankan musician to appeal on behalf of autistic children and people with autism in Sri Lanka, urging Sri Lankans to 'speak up for those who cannot speak up for themselves.' De Silva received a standing ovation. He was also a film background singer where he also sang the songs of the film Seetha Devi as well as the baila songs of the films Samanmalee and Mage Amma. He turned to Baila singing because of Wally Bastiansz. De Silva, who became a fan of Wally, one day invited him to his house. He sang some of his songs on the guitar that day and recorded them from his home recorder. Since then, he sang many of Bastiansz' songs such as Yaman bando, and Hai Hui baby Achchi. De Silva also sang record songs and Nadagam songs such as Raja Sangabo Hisa De Dugiyata, Muni Nandana Siripada, Panamure Eth Raja, Amba Damba Naran, Budubawa Pathana Vesathuru Nirinda.

In 1986, De Silva moved to England. On 7 June 2003, he performed in a sold-out concert at BMICH titled 'Desmond Live in Concert'. He launched the first ever Concert for Autism for Sri Lanka in Sydney, Australia on 31 March 2006.

== Personal life and death ==
De Silva married Deanna de Zilwa and they had two sons and a daughter.

His second marriage was to Lilamani Wijeratne.

Desmond met and married his third wife, Phyllis Van Houten, in Sydney, Australia, where they lived. They were in Melbourne where he performed at a New Year’ Eve Dance. He died of a heart attack on 9 January 2022 at the age of 77.

== Discography ==
- Baila 20
- Gramaphone Express
- Chuuda Maanike
- Haadu Hathak
- Komali Pane
- Baila Rajje
- Desmond Silva with Sunflowers

== See also ==
- Music of Sri Lanka
- List of Sri Lankan musicians
