= Andhra Pradesh Handicrafts Development Corporation =

Public Sector Undertaking in India

Lepakshi Handicrafts

Public Sector Undertaking overview
- Formed: 1982
- Type: Handicraft
- Jurisdiction: Andhra Pradesh, India
- Headquarters: Gandhinagar, Vijaywada, Andhra Pradesh, India
- Motto: An Endless Collection
- Parent department: Handicrafts Development Corporation, Government of Andhra Pradesh
- Website: www.lepakshihandicrafts.gov.in/index.html/

Lepakshi Handicrafts is a unit of Andhra Pradesh Handicrafts Development Corporation Ltd. which is an agency of Government of Andhra Pradesh established in 1982 to develop, preserve, and promote the tradition of craftsmanship in Andhra Pradesh.

== History ==
Lepakshi Handicrafts was set up in the year 1982 for the promotion, development and marketing of handicrafts. It also undertakes welfare activities for the benefit of the artisans.

== Products ==
Kondapalli toys, Kalamkari paintings, Bobbili veena, Etikoppaka toys, Leather puppets and Wood works.
