= Liu Zijian =

Liu Zijian may refer to:

- James T.C. Liu (1919–1993), Chinese-born historian
- Law Choo Kiang (born 1970), Malaysian politician
- Lu Zijian (1893–2012), Chinese martial artist
