= Indian 2 =

2024 Indian film by Shankar

- Theatrical release poster
- Directed by: Shankar
- Screenplay by: Shankar
- Story by: Shankar
- Dialogues by: B. Jeyamohan; Kabilan Vairamuthu; Lakshmi Saravanakumar
- Produced by: Subaskaran Allirajah; Udhayanidhi Stalin
- Starring: Kamal Haasan; Siddharth; S. J. Suryah; Rakul Preet Singh; Priya Bhavani Shankar; Vivek
- Cinematography: Ravi Varman; R. Rathnavelu
- Edited by: A. Sreekar Prasad
- Music by: Anirudh Ravichander
- Production companies: Lyca Productions; Red Giant Movies
- Distributed by: see below
- Release date: 12 July 2024
- Running time: 183 minutes (Note: Before the film's release, S. Shankar stated that the film's duration would be approximately 200 minutes (equivalent to 3 hours and 20 minutes) including the intermission pause, which then, excluding the pause, would be 185 minutes (3 hours and 5 minutes). However, according to the Central Board of Film Certification (CBFC), the duration was 180.04 minutes (3 hours and 4 seconds), but the British Board of Film Classification (BBFC) stated the duration was 178.38 minutes (2 hours, 58 minutes and 38 seconds). On the third day after the film's release, however, 20 minutes was removed, leaving the final runtime as 160 minutes (2 hours and 40 minutes).)
- Country: India
- Language: Tamil
- Budget: ₹250–300 crore (Note: The South First, and India Today, reported that the film was made on a budget of ₹250 crore, while The Times of India reported that it was ₹300 crore, and Business Today, and News18 reported it was ₹1.5 billion)
- Box office: ₹150 crore

Indian 2: Zero Tolerance is a 2024 Indian Tamil-language vigilante action film directed by Shankar, who co-wrote the script with B. Jeyamohan, Kabilan Vairamuthu and Lakshmi Saravanakumar. The film is jointly produced by Lyca Productions and Red Giant Movies. It is a sequel to Indian (1996). Kamal Haasan reprises his role as Senapathy, an aging freedom fighter turned vigilante who fights against corruption. The film includes an ensemble cast, with Siddharth, S. J. Suryah, Rakul Preet Singh, Priya Bhavani Shankar, Vivek, Samuthirakani, Bobby Simha, Nedumudi Venu, Delhi Ganesh, Manobala, Jagan, and Gulshan Grover. Kajal Aggarwal and Kalidas Jayaram also appear in cameo roles. In the film, set years after the events in Indian, Senapathy returns to help Chitra Aravindhan and his team deal with corruption in the country.

The project was announced in September 2017. Sri Venkateswara Creations was initially on board, but opted out a month later. Lyca entered the production thereafter. Principal photography commenced in January 2019 and occurred sporadically over five years, before wrapping up in March 2024. In 2020, an accident that killed some crew members and the COVID-19 pandemic delayed filming for two years until Red Giant Movies entered as co-producers. The technical crew includes musician Anirudh Ravichander, cinematographers Ravi Varman and R. Rathnavelu, (Note: Although Rathnavelu shot the film's preliminary portions, he was not credited in the promotional material) editor A. Sreekar Prasad, production designer T. Muthuraj and visual effects supervisor V. Srinivas Mohan.

Indian 2 was released worldwide on 12 July 2024 in standard and IMAX formats. The film received negative reviews from critics and was deemed inferior to its predecessor, criticizing the runtime and the lack of emotional depth in the screenplay, though Haasan, Siddharth and Suryah’s performance received some praise. Despite under-performing commercially, the film grossed ₹150 crore worldwide and became the fifth highest-grossing Tamil film of 2024 by the end of its theatrical run. As the final footage ran for over six hours, the project was split into two films, with the latter part, titled Indian 3: War Mode, facing delays before resuming work in October 2026.

== Plot ==
Chitra Aravindhan is an online media reporter living in Chennai with his mother, Chitra, and his father, Varadharajan, who works at the Anti-Corruption and Vigilance Commission (ACVC). Chitra runs a popular YouTube channel called "Barking Dogs" with his friends Aarthi, Thambesh, and Harish; the channel focuses on parodies and political satires. After a woman named Sunitha commits suicide, the four friends discover that a corrupt government official caused her death. In response, they stage a protest and are arrested by the local police. Chitra's girlfriend Disha bails the four out of jail and tells them that they cannot single-handedly fix the corruption problems of an entire country. In response, Chitra and his friends launch a "Come Back Indian" campaign, hoping to entice Senapathy, a retired vigilante who fought against corruption, (Note: As depicted in Indian (1996).) to return to India and end corruption.

Nilesh, one of Chitra's friends, spots Senapathy in Taipei, Taiwan, and discovers that he is running a martial arts school, teaching Varma Kalai. Nilesh persuades Senapathy to return to Chennai using his senior mentor's passport. Central Bureau of Investigation (CBI) officers Pramod and Elango unsuccessfully attempt to capture Senapathy upon his arrival in Chennai. In a viral Facebook Live video, Senapathy urges his followers and the public to expose corrupt individuals across India through peaceful means, inspired by Gandhian principles, while he will uphold the revolutionary ideals of Subhas Chandra Bose. Senapathy emphasizes that his followers should prioritize addressing corruption at home before tackling external issues. He also emotionally reveals that he reluctantly killed his son Chandru for accepting bribes. (Note: As depicted in Indian (1996).) Senapathy's message motivates Chitra and his friends, who start monitoring their parents' activities. Harish visits his uncle's motel and discovers they serve stale food to customers. Thambesh finds out that his brother-in-law, Nanjunda Moorthy, accepts bribes from customers, as does Aarthi's mother, Kanagalatha, who works as a sub-registrar. They report their findings to the ACVC, leading to their relatives' arrest.

Senapathy targets and kills several corrupt businessmen engaging in embezzlement and financial fraud, including multinational corporation owner Amit Aggarwal and a Gujarati gold trader named Darshan. Pramod investigates the killings and formulates a plan to arrest Senapathy. Meanwhile, Chitra monitors his father Varadharajan, initially finding no evidence of wrongdoing. However, Aarthi's father Thangavel reveals that Varadharajan had met with the corrupt officer who caused Sunitha's death. Initially skeptical, Chitra investigates and discovers the truth: Varadharajan had accepted a bribe from the officer. Chitra reports this to the ACVC, leading to Varadharajan's arrest. After learning that Chitra is responsible for Varadharajan's arrest, Chitra's mother evicts him from their home. Senapathy congratulates Chitra and his friends for their courage, and plans to meet them in person. The next day, however, they learn that Chitra's mother has committed suicide out of shame, and Varadharajan has disowned him. Devastated by the incident, Chitra and his friends meet with Senapathy near a graveyard. Senapathy apologizes for what has happened, but Chitra blames Senapathy for his mother's death and for killing Chandru. He launches a new campaign, "Go Back Indian", which becomes viral and earns Senapathy the wrath of the local populace.

Pramod and Elango locate Senapathy and attempt to arrest him, but he flees on an electric unicycle. During the chase, Senapathy is attacked by a group of gangsters, but fights them off. However, a mob of angry onlookers, including police, criminals, and corrupt officials, surrounds and attacks Senapathy, ignoring his pleas. Pramod and Elango eventually arrive and arrest him, but Senapathy uses Varma Kalai on Pramod, who suffers a brain injury and collapses. Pramod is admitted to a hospital, where the chief doctor informs his father, Krishnaswamy, a retired CBI officer, that Pramod will die in three hours and only Senapathy can reverse the tissue and nerve damage Pramod has suffered. Krishnaswamy then takes the paralysed Pramod to a nearby criminal court, where Senapathy faces conviction for his crimes. Senapathy offers to save Pramod's life in exchange for his release, and the judge reluctantly agrees. Senapathy leaves the court and drives away with Pramod in an ambulance, promising that he will return.

In a mid-credits scene, Senapathy introduces his parents, Veerasekaran Balram and Dhakshayini, to his followers, who, like him, were also freedom fighters during the British Raj in the 1890s and he is planning to bring new changes in India along with Chitra's and his friend's help.

== Cast ==
- Kamal Haasan in a triple role as
  - Veerasekaran Senapathy / Indian, an ex-INA agent turned vigilante
  - Chandrabose "Chandru" Senapathy, Senapathy’s son (archival footage from Indian)
  - Veerasekaran Balram, Senapathy’s father (cameo appearance in the post-credit scene of Indian 3)
- Siddharth as Chitra Aravindan
- S. J. Suryah as "Sakalakala Vallavan" Sarguna Pandian
- Rakul Preet Singh as Disha, Chitra's love interest (Voice dubbed by M. M. Manasi)
- Priya Bhavani Shankar as Aarthi Thangavel, Chitra's friend
- Bobby Simha as Pramod Krishnaswamy, a CBI officer, Krishnaswamy's son
- Vivek as Elango, a CBI officer (Note: Posthumous release) (body double performed by Kovai Babu)
- Samuthirakani as M. Varadharajan, Chitra's father
- Nedumudi Venu as Krishnaswamy, a retired CBI (Voice dubbed by Nassar)
- Delhi Ganesh as V. Krishna Mohan, Aarthi's neighbour
- Manobala as Nanjunda Moorthy, Thambesh's uncle
- Thambi Ramaiah as Thangavel
- Jagan as Thambesh, Chitra's friend
- Rishikanth as Harish, Chitra's friend
- Imman Annachi as Harish's uncle
- G. Marimuthu as Chitra's uncle
- Gulshan Grover as Amit Agarwal
- Zakir Hussain as Darshan
- Piyush Mishra as Kishan Singh
- Renuka as Kanagalatha Thangavel
- Kalyani Natarajan as Chitra Varadharajan, Chitra's mother
- Deepa Shankar as Thambesh's sister
- TSR Srinivasan as Dhanapal
- Vinod Sagar as M. I. Kirubakaran
- Yograj Singh as Amit's bodyguard
- Ravi Venkatraman as K. Kathiravel
- C. Ranganathan as Muthuraj
- Shyam Prasad as Pavan, Health Secretary Krishna Mohan's son
- Kajal Aggarwal as Dhakshayini, Senapathy’s mother (cameo appearance in the post-credit scene of Indian 3)
- Kalidas Jayaram as Nilesh Krishnaa (cameo appearance)
- Demi-Leigh Tebow as a model in the Item song "Calender Song"

== Production ==
=== Development ===
During the production of Indian (1996), its lead actor Kamal Haasan asked the director S. Shankar to make a sequel, but Shankar did not have a concrete story idea then. In September 2011, Shankar said many people asked him to make a sequel following Anna Hazare's anti-corruption crusade, and A. M. Rathnam, producer of the 1996 film, urged him to do so. In May 2015, Ratnam confirmed that he and Shankar discussed making a sequel but doubted the project's viability as the director was busy with the production of 2.0 (2018). Despite delaying starting the sequel due to 2.0, Shankar continued working on a story theme for it, under the tentative title Indian 2. On 30 September 2017, Haasan, the host of the first season of the Tamil reality television show Bigg Boss in Chennai, publicly announced the project during the season finale. Haasan was confirmed as the lead actor, reprising his role, and prominent Telugu film producer Dil Raju's Sri Venkateswara Creations was announced to fund the venture, thus marking his debut in Tamil.

In October 2017, Raju backed out, reportedly due to increased production costs. Shortly thereafter, Allirajah Subaskaran, head of Lyca Productions, took over as the film's producer. The project marks the reunion of Shankar with Haasan after a hiatus of 24 years. The director chose Anirudh Ravichander to score the music, marking their first collaboration, rather than his regular collaborator A. R. Rahman, who also scored music for its predecessor. Anirudh's inclusion was confirmed in late December 2018. cinematographer Ravi Varman, editor A. Sreekar Prasad and production designer T. Muthuraj were hired to be a part of the film's technical crew. Shankar collaborated with Jeyamohan, Kabilan Vairamuthu and Lakshmi Saravanakumar to co-write the film's script and dialogues.

Despite several proposed announcements of starting dates, the film's shoot was delayed throughout 2018 owing to Shankar's commitments with 2.0, which also faced significant production delays. Haasan also decided to use the time to release his long-delayed Vishwaroopam II (2018) and commit to his political career. In August 2018, Shankar and Haasan announced that the film's shoot would commence that December, The production house later publicly announced the project on 7 November, coinciding with Haasan's birthday, confirming its inclusion as the producers. Muthuraj began working on the production design the same month, as the film's shoot was scheduled to start in late that year; however the delay in its set work, made the team to postpone its shoot to early 2019. Haasan would receive around ₹1.5 billion (US$16 million) as remuneration for the film, the highest in his career.

=== Casting ===
In December 2018, Kajal Aggarwal was announced as the lead actress. For her role, Aggarwal learnt the basics of the Indian martial arts form Kalaripayattu. Initially Sivakarthikeyan was considered to play Siddharth's character in the film but declined the role due to his prior commitments. Ajay Devgn agreed to play the antagonist in the film, but production delays meant that he could not commit. Delhi Ganesh, who has frequently acted alongside Haasan, and RJ Balaji were signed to portray supporting roles. However, Balaji opted out of the film in October 2019. Nedumudi Venu was also set to reprise his role from the first film, but died in October 2021 after post COVID-19 complications.

Vidyut Jammwal said he was approached to act in the film but declined due to scheduling conflicts. Rakul Preet Singh also joined the film to star opposite the character played by Siddharth. Aishwarya Rajesh initially agreed to act in the film, but opted out due to call sheet issues; she was replaced by Priya Bhavani Shankar. Vivek confirmed that he will be a part of the project, collaborating with Haasan for the first time, where he plays the role of a CBI officer in the film. It was considered to be one of his posthumous films following his death in April 2021. In March 2023, British actor Benedict Garrett confirmed being a part of the cast, while Kalidas Jayaram also joined the cast in a prominent role during production in Taiwan in April 2023. S. J. Suryah officially confirmed his participation in the film in September 2023. The film also marked the posthumous appearances of Manobala and G. Marimuthu following their respective deaths in May and September 2023.

During a press meet before the release of the film, Shankar gave credit and acknowledgement to prominent Chinese martial artist Lü Zijian by indicating that Zijian is the source of inspiration he took when committing to direct the sequel part, where he developed a mindset to portray Senapathy as a martial arts expert even at the age of 106, highlighting the longevity of Zijian's calibre. Shankar was reportedly quoted as saying, "There is a martial arts master in China. His name is Lu Zijian. At the age of 120, he is performing martial arts. He is flying, kicking, and doing all the stuff." Shankar made such statements when queried and questioned about how Kamal Haasan's Senapathy character in the film could perform such action packed sequences even at an age of 106.

=== Filming ===
Principal photography began on 18 January 2019. A week-long shoot was held at a memorial home near Government General Hospital in Chennai, before the team also shot scenes at a nearby film studio. However the film was again delayed after the makers had trouble with the created sets. The shoot was pushed further owing to the Indian general election in May 2019, where Haasan's political party participated. Throughout the development process in 2018 and early 2019, the makers regularly denied media reports that the film had been shelved. Later, the shooting was resumed in May 2019, post elections. Owing to the long break between the schedules, cinematographer Ravi Varman also left the project after becoming committed to Mani Ratnam's Ponniyin Selvan: I, and was subsequently replaced by R. Rathnavelu who previously worked with Shankar in Enthiran (2010).

The second schedule began on 12 August 2019, at MGR Film City in Chennai, with scenes featuring Rakul Preet Singh being shot. Siddharth and Priya Bhavani Shankar too joined the sets on 16 August, and later Haasan too joined the sets on mid-September, where his portions being filmed. Haasan and team, later moved to a city hotel in T. Nagar, to proceed the shoot further. By 12 September, the second schedule which took place in Chennai had been completed. On 19 September, the team went to Rajahmundry, shoot the film's sequences featuring Haasan. Later on 23 October, Haasan and his team went to Bhopal to shoot the film at its third schedule.

On 25 October 2019, it was reported that a massive political rally along with a fight sequence, involving Haasan and 2000 junior artistes was shot in Bhopal at the cost of ₹40 crore (equivalent to ₹54 crore or US$5.8 million in 2026). On 30 October 2019, it was reported that the makers head to Gwalior for a 12-day long shoot schedule, which was completed within seven days. Post the completion, the actor went to Chennai, to attend a felicitation ceremony for his 60 years in Tamil cinema, followed by a surgery on 22 November to remove an implant that was performed after he met with an accident in 2016. Scenes without featuring Haasan were canned, to complete major portions of the film, and planned to shoot his portions, after his recovery. On 21 January 2020, it was reported that Haasan will shoot for the film post his recovery, and it will take place at the EVP Film City, Chennai which will last for 35 days. It was reported that the film's team will change the location from China to Italy, due to fear of the COVID-19 pandemic. Filming was completed by 25 March 2024.

=== Accident on the sets ===
On 19 February 2020, during the shooting of the film, a crane carrying a heavy flash light fell on the sets, resulting in the deaths of three crew members, including an assistant director and leaving ten more injured. Haasan, Shankar and Aggarwal had narrow escapes. A case was filed against Lyca Productions, along with three other persons by the Chennai police in connection with the accident on 21 February; The crane operator Rajan who absconded post the incident, was arrested and booked under three sections, the same day. Later Haasan and Shankar were summoned by the CBI, to investigate the accident during the sets.

On 26 February 2020, a week after the incident, Haasan wrote a letter to Lyca Productions regarding to conduct a safety audit for the prevention of any unfortunate events. The very same day, Subaskaran released a statement on Twitter, stating the shoot was held completely under the supervision of Haasan and Shankar. On 28 February 2020, Shankar announced that a donation of ₹1 crore (equivalent to ₹1.3 crore or US$140,000 in 2026) will be given to the family of the deceased. Following the accident, the team planned to shift the shooting location from EVP Film City to Binny Mills.

=== COVID-19 shutdown and further delays ===
Filming was further delayed due to the COVID-19 restrictions that came into effect during March 2020. Haasan planned to resume shooting in January 2021, after hosting the fourth season of Bigg Boss. In September 2020, Haasan also signed Lokesh Kanagaraj's Vikram during the intermediate timeline, and Shankar also felt disappointed with the production house for not taking a call on the resumption of the shoot. According to The Times of India, a spokesperson from the production team told that:

"Shankar and his team were hoping that they would resume the shoot once the government allows film shoots with a larger crew. But now, the production house wants to bring down the cost further to make up for the losses as a result of the lockdown. But Shankar, who has already brought down the budget from `400 crore to ` 220 crore after their first disagreement, feels it would be very hard to make the film as he has envisioned with further budget cuts. So, the production house decided to play the waiting game and stayed mum on the resumption of the project. Meanwhile, Kamal Haasan has committed to Lokesh Kanagaraj's film. He was hoping to start that film after wrapping up work on Indian 2, and did not start production work on Lokesh's film. But after seeing the current deadlock, he did a photo shoot with celebrity photographer Venket Ram at AVM Studio a couple of days ago. This has made Shankar realise that he might lose precious time if he keeps sitting idle, waiting for the producers of Indian 2 to take a call on resumption of the shoot. So, he has dashed off a letter to them, asking them to provide him with their plans for the project, and allowing him to work on another film if they intend to delay things even further."

The report also claimed they had been told that Shankar had completed around 60% cent of the film's portions, including the intermission sequence, and "Even though Kamal is now focusing on Lokesh's project, he is also keen on wrapping up this film because he feels the film will give a major boost to his political image in the upcoming state elections, and wants it to release at least by summer 2021." However, the company's COO, P. Kannan, denied it as a baseless rumour and stated that they did not get any kind of such information from the director. He added, "The film requires a huge crew of 500-600 people on the set, so the planning is going on. We are in the process of deciding how to move forward with the shoot, and in fact, we met Kamal Haasan yesterday to discuss this. We are hoping to resume the shoot soon."

In January 2021, due to the 2021 Tamil Nadu Legislative Assembly election, the crew planned to resume the shoot without Haasan in February, with the other cast and the director advised to keep themselves available for the shoot, while Haasan's portions would be filmed post-elections. That same month, Rathnavelu also opted out of the film citing schedule conflicts. Aggarwal, in March 2021, stated that the reason for the delay was that most of the crew members are from the United States, they are unable to travel and work in India due to COVID-19 travel restrictions.

Later in February 2021, Shankar officially announced his debut directorial in Telugu, RC15 (later titled as Game Changer) with Ram Charan, and also planned for the Hindi remake of Anniyan, with Ranveer Singh, which was later shelved. In April 2021, Lyca Productions submitted a suit against Shankar to restrain directing any other film before his commitments with the film. However, Shankar denied Lyca's allegations and also argued that the production house cannot prevent him from making other films. The court ordered Shankar and Lyca Productions to settle this issue amicably, but negotiations failed, with Shankar blaming Haasan and Lyca for the delay. In June 2021, the Madras High Court denied the producer's appeal to stop Shankar directing other films. Filming was further planned to be resumed in December 2021, but pushed back further due to Haasan and Shankar's other commitments.

=== Resumption ===
In May 2022, during the promotions of Vikram, Haasan indicated the plans of resuming the film, once Shankar completes Game Changer. Following the success of Vikram, plans to revive Indian 2 were being initiated, and during June 2022, Udhayanidhi Stalin of Red Giant Movies confirmed he had discussions with Subaskaran and that filming would resume soon, though he did not say whether he would be co-producing or distributing the film. On 24 August 2022, Red Giant Movies came on board as the co-producers, and a preliminary schedule featuring Simha and other artists were filmed. Ravi Varman, who earlier left the project, returned to handle cinematography. During the same time, Shankar announced that he will be filming it simultaneously with Game Changer. Haasan and Aggarwal joined the film's shooting, that was held at Tirupati on 21 September. Both the artists performed the Kalaripayattu and Varma kalai art forms, under the guidance of Dr. A. K. Prakasan Gurukkal, the founder of the spiritual art form. In November 2022, a minor schedule took place in Chennai with other supporting characters after Haasan was unavailable due to his commitments on hosting the sixth season of Bigg Boss.

In February 2023, a month-long schedule was held at the Adityaram Studios in Chennai, where filming would be held for a single stretch and was considered to be the longest schedule. In this schedule, several night shoots took place. After the schedule wrap, the team planned for filming an action sequence set in train at South Africa. On 1 April 2023, the team moved to Taiwan for filming a major sequence, and thereafter, went to Johannesburg for filming the aforementioned train sequence on 12 April 2023. Although being planned as a 12-day schedule, it was filmed within six days. On 10 May 2023, Shankar filmed a major schedule in Chennai, which was completed on 31 May. On 19 June 2023, a sequence was supposed to be filmed at the Chennai International Airport but was interrupted claiming that the crew did not obtain proper permission from the officials.

After a four-month break, in November 2023, filming for the concurrent schedule began in Vijayawada. The crew had shot few sequences at the Alankar Center at Gandhinagar with the presence of 8000 extras for four days, and moved to Visakhapatnam for a 10-day schedule. Shortly afterwards, the team moved to Chennai for filming the remaining sequences and in late-December 2023, the team wrapped the schedule except for filming two songs. In early January 2024, it was announced that the production for the film has been completed. However, Ananda Vikatan reported that filming for few songs were pending which would be shot in India before the 2024 Indian general election. The following month, it was reported that filming was nearing conclusion. A song was filmed for 10 days during early-March 2024 at the housing boards in Chennai painted with silhouettes of Senapathy and featured Siddharth and Priya Bhavani Shankar. On 25 March, Haasan announced that the production of the film has been completed.

=== Design ===
In June 2021, Seema Tabassum, Haasan's make-up artist claimed that the film consisted of using prosthetic makeups for Haasan and Aggarwal. Haasan's friend and makeup artist Michael Westmore, who previously worked in the predecessor, provided inputs for the makeup and design during their meeting in United States in August 2022. Margaux Lancaster also joined the film's crew, post-completion of the Taiwan schedule in April 2023. The production team members claimed that the prosthetic makeup takes around four to five hours, hence Haasan would come to the sets at 5:00 a.m. ahead of the shooting at 9:00 am. The crew had to be fast while shooting his portions as it would be really difficult for Haasan to shoot with the prosthetics due to the increase in temperature, and after filming those sequences, it takes around two hours to remove the prosthetics. Legacy Effects designed prosthetic makeup and animatronics, with Vance Hartwell and Pattanam Rasheed as the makeup artists. Haasan's costume designer Amritha Ram worked on the film, with Pallavi Singh, Gavin Miguel, Rocky and S. B. Satheesan.

=== Post-production ===
The editing of the film began in May 2020, after Tamil Nadu government permitted resumption of post-production works of Tamil films that were interrupted due to the COVID-19 pandemic and were instructed to follow the necessary safety regulations. The team decided to edit most of the available footage that was completed before the prolonged delay of the film's shoot. Due to Vivek and Venu's deaths before production could be completed, Shankar decided to use visual effects to complete their remaining scenes. Vivek's scenes were completed with Kovai Babu being the body double and his face digitally morphed to resemble Vivek.

Full-fledged post-production works began during July 2023. Shankar collaborated with Lola Visual Effects, known for their work in several American films, to showcase younger looks of Haasan through de-aging technology, and work on the visual effects began at the studio lot of Paramount Pictures. V. Srinivas Mohan joined the film as the visual effects supervisor. In October 2023, Haasan started dubbing for his portions in the film held at the Le Magic Lantern Studio in Chennai. and the very same month the production company tweeted that they had received a copy of the first edit for the film.

In January 2024, sources from the production team claimed that the final edit had been locked and the post-production team was working on the digital intermediate, colour grading, previsualisation, computer graphics and several aspects, without making any amendments from the cut. Nearly four reels of the edit had been sent for the sound design and sound effects. Although the team intended to complete the film before the tentative April 2024 release, the producers wanted to announce the date only after being assured by all the post-production units.

=== Splitting into two films ===
Although Indian 2 was conceived as a single film during production, in June 2023 Udhayanidhi stated that they had discussed plans for a sequel. In May 2020, it was reported that the film would be split into two-parts, as the makers had shot footage amounting to six hours of length. In October 2023, Ananda Vikatan said around 80% of the footage had been shot for Indian 3, and only 25 days were needed to complete it. On 24 March 2024, Haasan confirmed the third instalment in the franchise; he stated that Indian 3 was shot alongside Indian 2. At the launch of the trailer of Indian 2, Shankar stated that the split was done because he was impressed with all that was shot and cutting the film to a shorter length would affect its quality. Aggarwal's portions were later confirmed to only feature in Indian 3, although footage from that film including both Aggarwal and Haasan ultimately played at the end of Indian 2 acting like a teaser.

== Music ==
The soundtrack album and background score are composed by Anirudh Ravichander, who is working with Shankar for the first time. He replaces Shankar's frequent collaborator A. R. Rahman, who scored the 1996 film. This will mark the second collaboration of Anirudh with Haasan, after Vikram. After the offer came his way in November 2017, Anirudh started composing for the songs during December 2017, and it took a year to complete the album. He remarked that the delay in the release of 2.0 gave him more time to work on the film's songs.

In November 2023, it was announced that the audio rights for the film were acquired by Sony Music India. The album was officially released on 1 June 2024, which coincided with a promotional event held at Jawaharlal Nehru Indoor Stadium in Chennai, with the presence of the film's cast and crew and all the other celebrities.

== Marketing ==
The film's final trailer was released on 25 June 2024. It received an unfavourable response from viewers, with particular criticism towards Haasan's makeup, Shankar's direction and the writing; some noted the absence of deceased writer Sujatha, whose contributions to the 1996 film were instrumental in its success. Viewers also questioned the title character's seemingly flawless agility and reflexes, despite him evidently being over 100 years old.

== Release ==
=== Theatrical ===
Indian 2 was released worldwide on 12 July 2024 in standard and IMAX formats. In April 2023, Udhayanidhi Stalin stated that they were currently planning on releasing the film in theatres during summer (April–June 2024), as it featured extensive visual effects and needed to be completed within the end of 2023. A year later, on 6 April 2024, the production houses officially announced that the film would theatrically release worldwide that June. However, after a month, the film was revealed to have been postponed to 12 July, due to a few unfinished post-production works and the makers not wanting to compromise on the quality. Indian 2 was the first Indian film to be released in the 4DX format in Saudi Arabia.

=== Distribution ===
Sree Gokulam Movies bought the film's distribution rights for Kerala, and Romeo Pictures did so for Karnataka. Pen Marudhar acquired the North India distribution rights. In Malaysia, the distribution rights were acquired by 3 Dot Movies.

=== Home media ===
In July 2023, it was announced that the film's digital streaming rights were purchased by Netflix for a price of ₹200 crore (US$21 million). The satellite rights were acquired by Kalaignar TV.

== Reception ==
=== Critical response ===
Indian 2 received negative reviews from critics. On the review aggregator website Rotten Tomatoes, 15% of 13 critics' reviews are positive, with an average rating of 4/10.

Sakshi Verma of India TV gave 2.5/5 stars and wrote, "The movie struggles to be real and dramatic, even while it tries to deliver sincere sentiments. But not the actors or technicians, it's the director that fails us. Shankar uses outdated writing structures; the movie feels uninspired and stale. M. Suganth of The Times of India gave 2/5 stars and wrote, "The problem with Indian 2 is that it is filled with writing that lacks nuance and characters who are caricatures. Even in terms of scenes, all the visual excesses that Shankar throws at them – grand sets, visual effects, and frames filled with people – hardly touch us as there's no emotional connect."

B. V. S. Prakash of Deccan Chronicle gave 2/5 stars and wrote: "Director Shankar used Senapathy to trigger the consciousness of youngsters and motivate them to fight corruption but falters in execution since four people is a bit too much since it sidelines Senapathy's feats." Anusha Sundar of OTTPlay gave 2/5 stars and wrote "Indian 2 is a film that has Shankar's stamp visually all over. Kamal Haasan may not have gotten a glorious comeback as he did in Vikram (2022), but the actor tries to save the film as much as possible. But alas, there is only so much an actor can do." Janani K of India Today gave 2/5 stars and wrote "Indian 2 is weak in every aspect. Underneath the mess, there lies ONE interesting idea. But, by then, the film comes to an end – much to the relief of everyone. Performance-wise, Kamal Haasan speaks Hindi, according to the demography, but has been dubbed in Tamil, which is off-putting."

Shubhra Gupta of The Indian Express gave 1/5 stars and wrote,"Indian 2 is nothing but a three-hour time suck, where I was bored out of my wits. The end credits tell us that there's going to be a third part. Help." Latha Srinivasan of Hindustan Times wrote "Indian 2 desperately tries to combine the old and the new, to present to us a story that'll be appealing to the younger audience. Kamal Haasan says he's fighting for India's second Independence in the film. But the audience is left fighting to figure out what's good in this misfire of a film." Gopinath Rajendran of The Hindu wrote "More than #ComeBackIndian, we hope Indian 3 will be a comeback for the veteran filmmaker [Shankar] and the legendary actor [Kamal Haasan]."

Reviewing the dubbed Hindi version, Devash Sharma of Filmfare gave 3.5/5 stars and wrote, "It's Kamal's film all the way, and his screen presence and acting chops make you forget the haphazard screenplay. Siddharth too is in fine form as a young man with a conscience who wants to do the right thing but is unsure of his actions afterwards. Rakul Preet Singh plays the supportive girlfriend to a T and perhaps would have a better arc in the sequel." Titas Chowdhury of News18 gave 2/5 stars and wrote "Hindustani 2 is a great attempt but it loses itself in its own ambitions. Known for taking risks, S Shankar chooses to stay in his comfort zone with this film." Nandini Ramnath of Scroll.in wrote "The aim is to be "pan-Indian". The result is a bloated, brutish film that rejects non-violent solutions to corruption ("elections do not represent change but an exchange). Senapathy's tactics didn't fail the first time round. The success rate is even lower in the sequel."

Reviewing the dubbed Telugu version, Banda Kalyan of Samayam gave 2.5/5 and wrote, "Technically Indian 2 is good. Shankar used the technical team well. The visuals, however, feel grander. Shankar's mark appears on the songs. But those songs do not seem to work to listen to and watch again. are not visible AR Rahman's music for Bharateeyudu will remain forever."

In response to the negative reviews, particularly criticism towards the three-hour-long runtime, 20 minutes of the runtime were removed on the second day of the film's release and began screening in theatres on the third day, leaving the final runtime as 2 hours and 40 minutes.

== Controversy ==
On 9 July 2024, a case was reportedly filed against the makers seeking a ban on the film. Aasan Rajendran, a varma kalai practitioner, claimed that he trained Haasan for the first film, and mentioned in his complaint that his techniques were used in the sequel too. He also mentioned that he had not given permission.

== Future ==
In May 2024, Haasan said they were aiming to release Indian 3 in January 2025, six months after the release of the predecessor. A glimpse of Indian 3 was shown by the makers as a mid-credit scene in Indian 2. However, due to the critical and commercial failure of Indian 2, the fate of Indian 3 became unclear as production on the film slowed down. However, on 8 October 2026, post-production properly resumed. It was later reported that Shankar wanted to film scenes related to Indian 3 for 25 days but was rebuffed by Lyca who asked him to complete the film with existing footage.

== See also ==
- List of films with the longest production time
