= Bummadiya =

Sri Lankan folk instrument

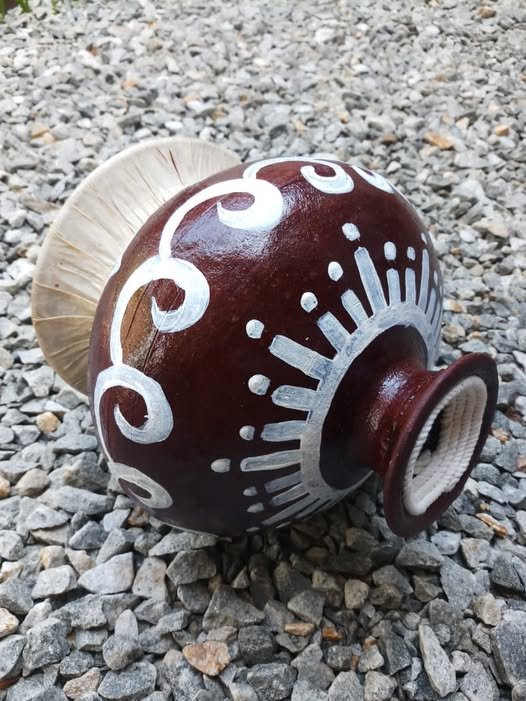
Bummadiya

Bummadiya (Sinhala: බුම්මැඩිය bummæḍiya) is a traditional Sri Lankan folk drum, unique in its construction from clay. It belongs to the 'Athatha' (Played using hand) type of the 'Pancha Thurya Bhanda'. It is shaped like a gourd with an elongated neck or a clay water vessel ("Kalaya"), and has goat skin, monitor skin or monkey skin stretched over its mouth. There are no standard measurements for its construction. The body is made using clay with two openings, while only the opening that is used to produce sounds is covered by the animal skin. It is also known as "Bumgediya" or "Bumbeyya" and has been historically referred to as "Kumbha bera", "Bimbisaka" and "Kala bera" during certain periods of its evolution.

Bummadiya was played while singing harvest songs ("Goyam Kavi"), along with the Udekkiya. These verses often describe the importance of meritorious deeds and the life of buddha.

Sinhala Original	Romanisation	English Translation
කවියෙන් කීවොත් මුනි ගුණ වරුනා දෙසවන් යොමු කර අසනුය මෙ දනා එපිනෙන් දෙව් මනු ලොව වැඩ වමිනා සසරින් එතරව යයි මතු නිවනා	Kaviyen kīvot muni guṇa varunā Desavan yomu kara asanuya me danā Epinen dev manu lova væḍa vaminā Sasarin etarava yayi matu nivanā	Saying buddha's qualities in poems. All these people, lend me your ears. From this virtue, you will be born in the human world or heaven. Then attain nirvana, after ending samsara.
මෙ කපට විසිතා සංකර පොරණේ අප මහ බෝසත් දළිඳුව එදණේ අසරණ මෑණියො සහ නැව් නැගුනේ සිඳු පිට ගිය නැව සුළඟට බිදුණේ	Me kapaṭa visitā saṁkara poraṇē Apa maha bōsat daḷin̆duva edaṇē Asaraṇa mǣṇiyo saha næv nægunē Sin̆du piṭa giya næva suḷan̆gaṭa biduṇē	In the ancient times of this Kalpa, our Bodhisattva was born poor With his helpless mother, he set sail. But the strong winds destroyed the ship.
එතැන් පටන් බව සයුරට බැසලා උපන් ජාතිවල පින් රැස් කරලා නුදුන් දනක් නැත බුදු බව පතලා ඉතින් කියමි විවරණයට බැසලා	Etæn paṭan bava sayuraṭa bæsalā Upan jātivala pin ræs karalā Nudun danak næta budu bava patalā Itin kiyami vivaraṇayaṭa bæsalā	From there, he entered the ocean of samsara. Gathered virtues on all born lives. There were no alms that were not given. So, this is my narration.
කෙතේ ගොයම් කපනව දැන් අපහට ගසයි බෙරය සොඳ ලෙස බෙරකරු හට නැමී තිබෙන ගොයමුත් එක පැත්තට කපමු කපමු පද තාලෙට හනිකට	Ketē goyam kapanava dæn apahaṭa Gasayi beraya son̆da lesa berakaru haṭa Næmī tibena goyamut eka pættaṭa Kapamu kapamu pada tāleṭa hanikaṭa	The fields are being harvested for us now The drum is being played well by the drummer Paddy is also bent to one side Let's quickly harvest to the beat

== History ==
Bummadiya has a long history, dating back to the Anuradhapura kingdom according to some literary and archeological sources. 'Saraththadeepani Teekawa' holds that it is unsuitable for Buddhist monks to play the "Kumbha beraya". A stone carving of a dwarf playing the bummadiya can be found on a stone pillar at the Lovamahapaya Monastery in Anuradhapura. The Thupavamsa and 'Saddharmalankaraya' mentions an instrument called the "Ekas Beraya" (One-eyed drum) which could be a description of the Bummadiya. The instrument is called "Bimbisaka" in the 'Deeganikaya Attakatha' and mentions that it is used in ritualistic practices. 'Vesathuru Da Sanne' includes several types of drums that were used at the time, which includes the, "Kala beraya". 'Thisara Sandeshaya' of the Gampola Kingdom also includes the "Kala beraya" in one of its poems.

Sinhala Original	Romanisation	English Translation
තහලම් කළ බෙර තම්මැට පට තන්තිරි ඩමරු තඹමේ ටක බෙර බොම්බිලි වීණා මිණි සුසිරු බෙර මද්දල කහලම් රසු නිගළම් බඳ සොඳුරු මෙසියල් මහ ගිගුමෙන් පළ කෙරෙමින් සිඳු අයුරු	Tahalam kaḷa bera tammæṭa paṭa tantiri ḍamaru Tam̆bamē ṭaka bera bombili vīṇā miṇi susiru Bera maddala kahalam rasu nigaḷam ban̆da son̆duru Mesiyal maha gigumen paḷa keremin sin̆du ayuru	Thalampata, Kala Bera, Thammattama, Pata Bera (Drum), Thanthiri (Veena), Damaru (Drum), Flute, Udakkiya (Drum), Bombili Veena, Flute made of gemstones, Maddalaya, Kalam (Flute), beautiful Gejji, All of these making a roaring sound, like that of the sea.

Folk poems ("Jana Kavi") also mention "Kala bera wayeema" (Playing the Kala Bera).

Sinhala Original	Romanisation	English Translation
තොසන් වඩන අඟනෝ ලොව සරියේ අසන් මෙමා කී කවි පද සරියේ වසන් නොකර පවසන් ඇති සැටියේ අසන්න කළ ගෙඩි පිඹිනා සැටියේ	Tosan vaḍana an̆ganō lova sariyē Asan memā kī kavi pada sariyē Vasan nokara pavasan æti sæṭiyē Asanna kaḷa geḍi pim̆binā sæṭiyē	To the fair maidens bringing joy to everyone, listen to my verses. Ask and tell us without hiding, the way the kala gediya is played.
ලත් පමණට මැටි ඉද කරවා ගෙන පත් බිඳලා කළ ගෙඩි තනවා ගෙන අත් නෑරම කළ ගෙඩි තෝරා ගෙන සිත් සතොසින් කළ පිඹිනට වෙන වෙන	Lat pamaṇaṭa mæṭi ida karavā gena Pat bin̆dalā kaḷa geḍi tanavā gena At nǣrama kaḷa geḍi tōrā gena Sit satosin kaḷa pim̆binaṭa vena vena	Taking the right amount of clay, and kneading it into the shape desired, a kala gediya is made. Choose them and have them on all your hands. One by one, play them with joy.
ඇඳලා සේලේ රැලි ගවසාලා බැඳලා පුස්කොළ කණේ තබාලා බැඳලා වරලස මල් ගවසාලා පිඹින්න කළගෙඩි එමු ව කියාලා	Æn̆dalā sēlē ræli gavasālā Bæn̆dalā puskoḷa kaṇē tabālā Bæn̆dalā varalasa mal gavasālā Pim̆binna kaḷageḍi emu va kiyālā	(Maidens) Dressed up in the traditional skirt with pleats, with earrings on the ears, and flowers on their tied hair, come out and play kala gedi.

== See also ==
- Music of Sri Lanka
- Ghatam
- Udu
- Cegléd water jug
