= Bhavanipuram =

Neighborhood in India

- Neighbourhood
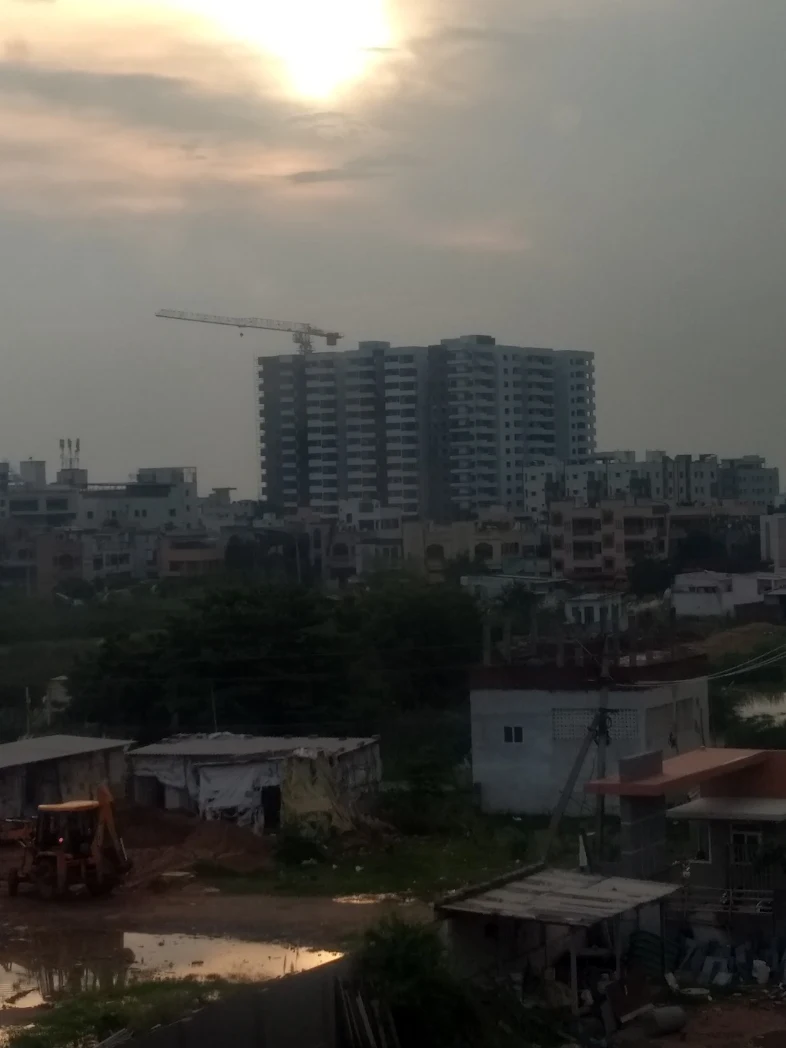
- View of Bhavanipuram

- Location in Andhra Pradesh, India
- Coordinates: 16.511°N 80.64°E
- Country: India
- State: Andhra Pradesh
- District: NTR
- Mandal: Vijayawada West
- City: Vijayawada
- Metro: Andhra Pradesh Capital Region

Government
  - Type: Mayor–Council
  - Body: Vijayawada Municipal Corporation

Languages
  - Official: Telugu
- Time zone: UTC+5:30 (IST)
- PIN: 520012
- Telephone code: 0866
- Vehicle registration: AP16
- Lok Sabha constituency: Vijayawada

Bhavanipuram is a residential hub located to the West Central of Vijayawada in Andhra Pradesh, India. The locality shares its borders with Vijayawada Bypass Road and National Highway 65. Though consisting of vacant plots till a few years back, the area now consists of commercial and residential establishments. Popular areas located close to Bhavanipuram include Undavalli, Krishna Lanka, Gollapudi, Jakkampudi, Vidyadarapuram, Chitti Nagar, and Kabela.

== Transport ==
Bhavanipuram is well connected to other parts of the city by City buses run by APSRTC 23H Penamaluru to BhavaniPuram H.B colony.

== History ==
Until the early 1990s, the area mostly consisted of vacant plots, estates and roadside restaurants to serve the traffic along NH9 headed to Bombay. Commercial activity first shifted here from the center of the city in the 1990s with the expansion of the western suburbs of Vijayawada due to ongoing construction activity in the area and its surrounding areas.
