= Vijayawada Central mandal =

- Mandal
- Interactive Map Outlining Vijayawada Urban mandals
- Location in Andhra Pradesh, India
- Coordinates: 16°32′N 80°35′E
- Country: India
- State: Andhra Pradesh
- District: NTR
- Headquarters: Gandhinagar, Vijayawada

Languages
  - Official: Telugu
- Time zone: UTC+5:30 (IST)

Vijayawada Central mandal is one of the 20 mandals in the NTR district of the Indian state of Andhra Pradesh. It is one of the four mandals that formed from the Vijayawada Urban mandal after bifurcation in 2018 under the reorganization of revenue mandals. It is under the administration of Vijayawada revenue division, and the headquarters are located at Gandhinagar, Vijayawada.

== Wards/villages included ==
in the Vijayawada Central Mandal with Headquarters at Gandhinagar (Existing Mandal Office) covering the Municipal divisions of 15,16,17,18,19,20,21,22,23,24,36,40,41,42,48 & 50 (16 Municipal Divisions)

1. Gandhinagar
2. Governorpet
3. Bavajipet
4. Suryaraopet
5. Ramalingeswara nagar(Part)
6. Satyanarayana nagar
7. Purnachandra Nagar
8. Krishna Lanka(Part)
9. Labbipet
