= Vijayawada Urban mandal =

Mandal in Krishna district (Andhra Pradesh), India

Vijayawada (urban) mandal
- Mandal
- Interactive Map Outlining Vijayawada Urban mandal
- Location in Andhra Pradesh, India
- Coordinates: 16°30′30″N 80°38′30″E
- Country: India
- State: Andhra Pradesh
- District: NTR
- Headquarters: Vijayawada

Area
  - Total: 59.69 km^{2} (23.05 sq mi)

Population (2011)
  - Total: 1,021,806
  - Density: 17,120/km^{2} (44,340/sq mi)

Languages
  - Official: Telugu
- Time zone: UTC+5:30 (IST)

Vijayawada Urban mandal was a mandal in Krishna district of Andhra Pradesh. In 2018 it was bifurcated into 4 mandals under re-organization of revenue mandals and formed Vijayawada Central, Vijayawada North, Vijayawada East and Vijayawada West which were later incorporated into NTR district. It was under the administration of Vijayawada revenue division and has its headquarters at Vijayawada city. The mandal lies on the banks of Krishna River, bounded by Vijayawada (rural) mandal and Penamaluru mandals. The mandal was also a part of the Andhra Pradesh Capital Region under the jurisdiction of APCRDA.

== Demographics ==
As of 2011 census, the mandal had a population of 1,021,806. The total population constitute, 512,417 males and 509,389 females with a sex ratio of 994 females per 1000 males. 100,309 children are in the age group of 0–6 years, of which 51,950 are boys and 48,359 are girls. The average literacy rate stands at 81.35% with 749,635 literates.

== Cities, towns and villages ==
Vijayawada Urban consists of only one City that is Vijayawada and has no villages and hence, it was a fully urban mandal.

In 2018 Vijayawada Urban mandal was bifurcated in to 4 mandals

1. Vijayawada Central
2. Vijayawada North
3. Vijayawada East
4. Vijayawada West

== See also ==
- Vijayawada revenue division
