= Kovai Babu =

Indian comedian and actor

- Born: 29 March 1980 (age 46); Coimbatore, Tamil Nadu, India
- Occupation: Actor
- Years active: 1993–present

Kovai Babu is an Indian actor known for his work in Tamil-language films.

== Career ==
Kovai Babu became popular for his comedy track sequence in the role of Minor Kunjumani where he eventually shared screenspace with comedian Vivek for the film Kadhal Sadugudu (2003). He also made his presence felt in television soap operas with his hilarious performances in Star Vijay sponsored television soap opera Raja Rani.

He was well known for acting as a replacement to veteran actor Vivek in Kamal Haasan starrer Indian 2 who unexpectedly died in 2021 due to congestive heart failure. Vivek's scenes were completed with Kovai Babu being the body double and his face digitally morphed to resemble Vivek.

Due to Vivek and Venu's deaths before production of Indian 2 could be completed, Shankar decided to use visual effects to complete their remaining scenes. Vivek's unprecedented death during the middle of the principal photography meant that the remaining portions involving Vivek had to be wrapped up by bringing on board another person resembling similar to Vivek and as a result the director of the film S. Shankar roped in Kovai Babu as a like-to-like replacement. Kovai Babu eventually completed his film portions in both Indian 2 and Indian 3 by acting as a body double for late actor Vivek.

== Filmography ==
=== Films ===
- Sundara Kandam (1992)
- Parvathi Ennai Paradi (1993)
- Kaalamellam Kaathiruppen (1997)
- Shahjahan (2001)
- Punnagai Desam (2002)
- Kadhal Sadugudu (2003)
- Military (2003)
- Thirumalai (2003)
- Adhu Oru Kana Kaalam (2005)
- Ilakkanam (2006)
- Kalvanin Kadhali (2006)
- Pazhani (2008)
- Thenavattu (2008)
- Sirithal Rasipen (2009)
- Agam Puram (2010)
- Naankam Thamizhan (2013)
- Kaththi (2014)
- Palakkattu Madhavan (2015)
- Adhibar (2015)
- Vindhai (2015)
- Veera Sivaji (2016)
- Hara Hara Mahadevaki (2017)
- Kathanayagan (2017)
- Santharpam (2022) (as writer and producer)
- The Legend (2022)
- Veeran (2023)
- Indian 2 (2024)

=== Television series ===
- Raja Rani (2017–2023)
- Oru Oorla Oru Rajakumari (2018)
- Kannedhirey Thondrinal (2022–2023)
- Pudhu Vasantham (2023–2026)
