= Lü Zijian =

Chinese martial artist (died 2012)

Lü Zijian (Chinese: 吕紫剑; pinyin: Lǚ Zǐjiàn; died 21 October 2012) was a Chinese martial artist and centenarian. He is widely regarded and believed to be the oldest ever martial artist to live in earth. He was very much admired and well respected among the fraternity and to those who were very close to him in social circles.

== Biography ==
He was claimed to have been born in 1893, although there are confusions still surrounding around his actual date of birth.

== Career ==
According to reports, he had been conducting and practicing martial arts at the age of 118 thereby shattering the stereotypes surrounding around the age factor. He is also reported to be a canny operator in terms of having mastered the essence of traditional Chinese medicine. He prioritised and emphasized the paramount importance on the aspect of maintaining a disciplined lifestyle which was enhanced by his medicinal knowledge and it remarkably increased the longevity of his life, while it also helped to build up and shape up his body fitness levels which transformed his physical agility in order to convincingly perform martial arts even at a late age.

He is widely touted to be a multifaceted personality due to having mastered the craft in Xingyiquan (Shape-Will Boxing), Baguazhang (Eight Trigrams Palm), and Taijiquan (Tai Chi Chuan). There are several legends that have been dedicated and incorporated about Lu Zijian including the era during the 1920s, when he single-handedly took down a gang of dacoits by risking himself through carrying the task on his shoulders, he also used his bag of tricks that he learnt in martial arts in order to beat up a pervert factory owner in 1931 and he also escaped the Nanjing Massacre in 1944.

== Death ==
He died on 21 October 2012 at the age of 118, while he was asleep. His cause of death is assumed to have been a major complication that was triggered as a result of an accidental fall at least three years prior to his untimely demise.

== Legacy ==
Popular Indian filmmaker S. Shankar during a press meet prior to his much anticipated big budgeted high-profile film release of Indian 2, a sequel to cult classic vigilante action drama film Indian, gave credit and acknowledgement to Lu Zijian by indicating that Zijian is the source of inspiration he took when committing to direct the sequel part where he developed a mindset to portray Senapathy Indian thatha (donned by Kamal Haasan) as a martial arts expert (Varma kalai) even at the age of 106 highlighting the longevity of Zijian's calibre. Shankar was reportedly saying “There is a martial arts master in China. His name is Lu Zijian. At the age of 120, he is performing martial arts. He is flying, kicking, and doing all the stuff.” Shankar made such statements when queried and questioned about how Kamal Haasan's Senapathy character in the film could perform such action packed sequences even at an age of 106.
