= Plecto Aliquem Capite =

Black metal band

Plecto Aliquem Capite is a noise black metal band based in Colombo, Sri Lanka, formed in 2008.

== Biography ==
Buddhika Karunasekara and Nightmare formed the band in 2008 and was soon joined by Visharada Kasun Nawarathne.

The band has released three EPs, three splits and four singles to date. The current line up includes several musicians from the Sri Lankan underground music scene including Buddhika Karunasekara, Kasun Nawarathne, Sanka Priyankara and Chathuranga Fonseka.

== Discography ==
- 2008: Atrocities
- 2009: "Rewards of Seeking Wisdom" (Single)
- 2009: "As Agony Unfolds" (Split)
- 2009: "Stoned Guru Ramblings" (Single)
- 2010: "Across Death... Through Pain" (Split)
- 2010: As the Sane Crumble
- 2011: "Astral Mantras of Dyslexia" (Split)
- 2016: "Parasomnia" (Single)
- 2016: "Grief" (Single)
- 2016: The End
