= Gandhinagar, Vijayawada =

Gandhi Nagar
- City Centre
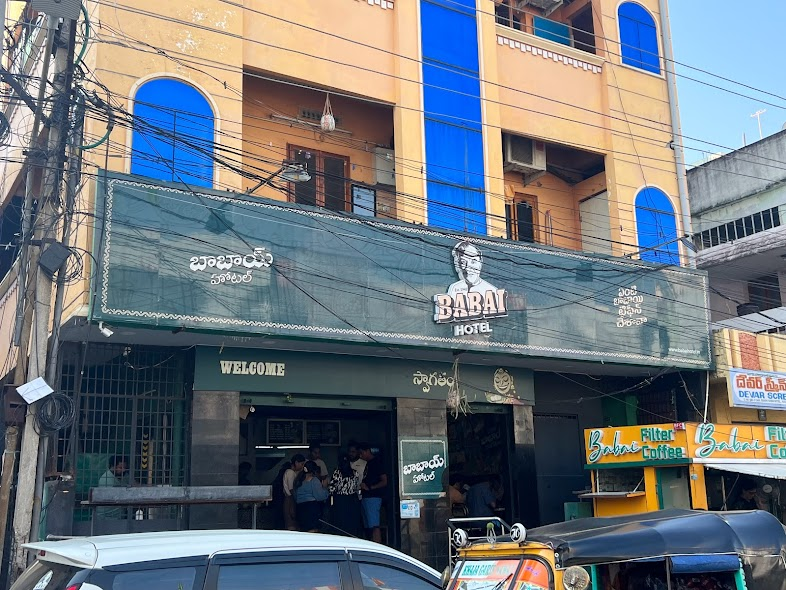
- Babai Hotel, Vijayawada

- Location in Andhra Pradesh, India Gandhi Nagar (India)
- Coordinates: 16°32′N 80°35′E
- Country: India
- State: Andhra Pradesh
- District: NTR
- Mandal: Vijayawada Central
- City: Vijayawada
- Metro: Andhra Pradesh Capital Region

Government
  - Type: Mayor-Council
  - Body: Vijayawada Municipal Corporation

Languages
  - Official: Telugu
- Time zone: UTC+5:30 (IST)
- PIN: 520003
- Telephone code: 0866
- Vehicle registration: AP 16

Gandhi Nagar or Gandhinagar, also Gandhinagaram, is a major commercial area of Vijayawada in Vijayawada Central mandal of NTR district of the Indian state of Andhra Pradesh. It is part of Vijayawada revenue division. Vijayawada railway station was located here, as is the Pushparam Ghat reservoir, built in 1962.
