= Bobbili veena =

Plucked string musical instrument

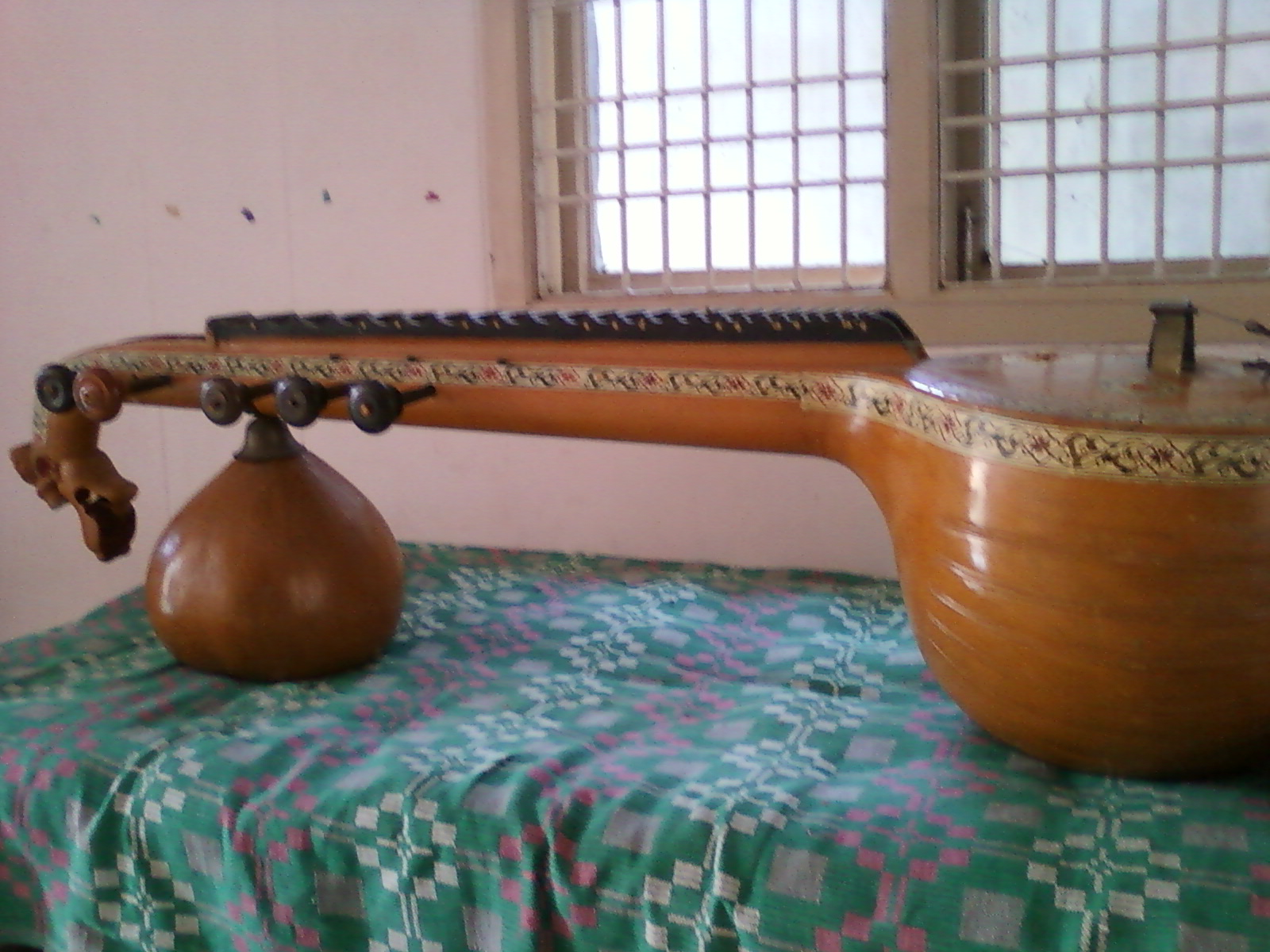
Bobbili Veena

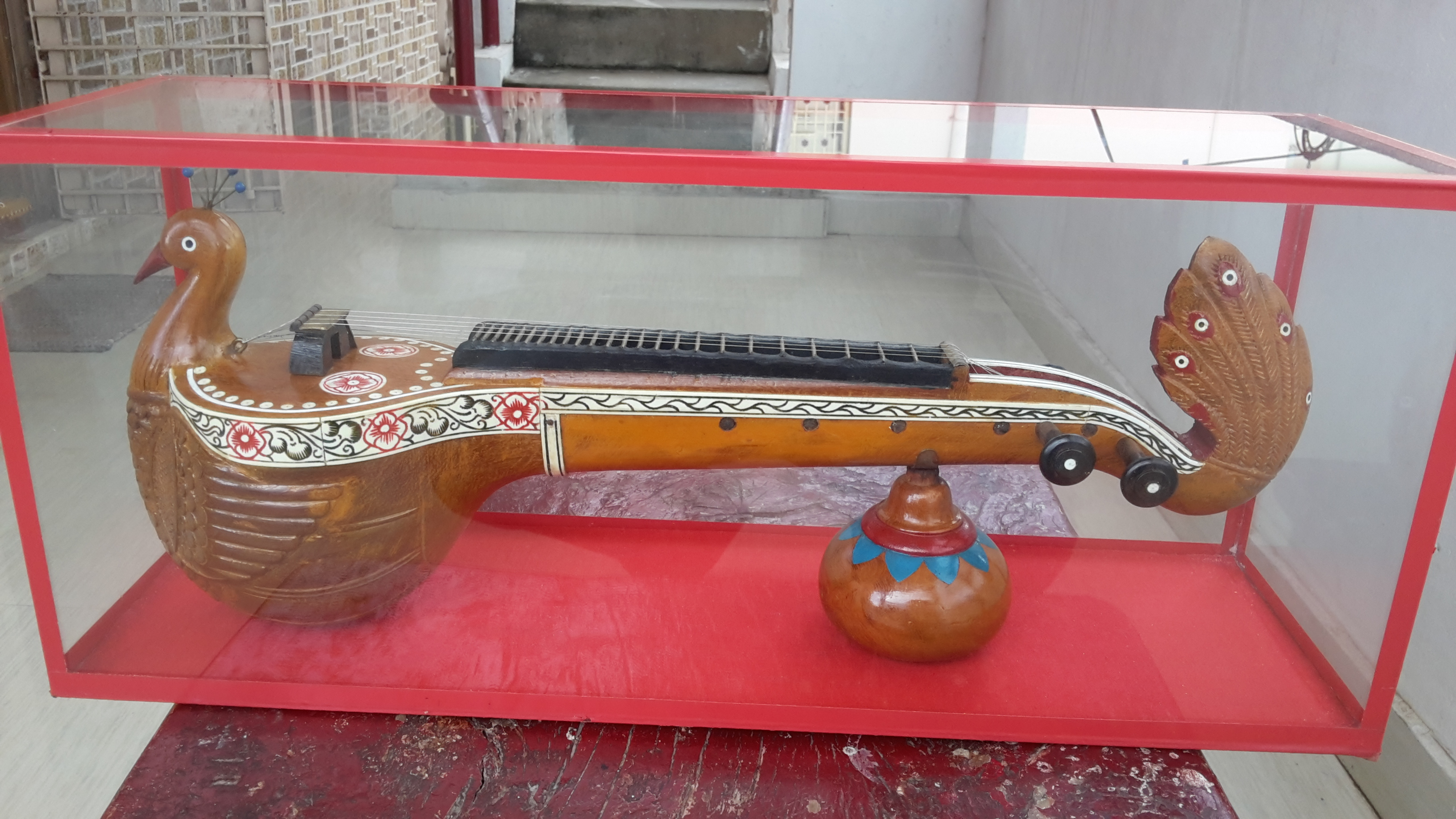
Bobbili Veena, in a glass case for decorative purpose.

Bobbili veena is a large plucked string instrument used in Carnatic classical music. The Veena is named after Bobbili, a place where it was invented. In 2011 the musical instrument got a Geographical Indication tag from the Government of India.

== History ==
Bobbili Veena is considered to be invented in Bobbili of Vizianagaram district, Andhra Pradesh. The making of the Veena started in the 17th century during the reign of Pedda Rayudu. At that time, playing Veena was a common practice in India, specially South India. The entire development process of the Veena took more than three centuries. Bobbili kingdom rulers were fond of music, and many of them learned to play Veena. In the Bobbili kingdom, the Veena used to be supplied by Sarwasiddi community craftsmen. These craftsmen were from Gollapalli. The craftsmen community who make this musical instrument are known as "Bobbili Veena sampradayam" (Bobbili Veena community).

== Description ==
A Bobbili Veena is carved from a single piece of jack wood. It has a bowl called kunda, which is hollowed out and covered with a wooden plate. The neck, called dandi, is typically 51 inches long. Bobbili Veena is a instrument of seven cords.
