= Faculties and institutions of University of Peradeniya =

The University of Peradeniya, in Sri Lanka, is composed of nine undergraduate faculties of study. These faculties contain 79 departments in total. In addition, the university has two postgraduate institutions and six affiliated centres.

== History ==
Founding of the Faculties of the University of Peradeniya
Faculty	Year founded
Faculty of Arts	1942
Faculty of Medicine	1966
Faculty of Science	1961
Faculty of Dental Sciences	1943
Faculty of Agriculture	1947
Faculty of Veterinary Medicine and Animal Science	1947
Faculty of Engineering	1950
Faculty of Allied Health Sciences	2005
Faculty of Management	2014

Under the pioneering work of Sir Ivor Jennings, University of Ceylon was established in 1942. At the beginning, it had only three present day faculties, namely; Faculty of Arts and Oriental Studies, Faculty of Medicine and Faculty of Science. A Faculty of Law also functioned separately. Since then, five other faculties have been added to the university at different times. Latest addition is the Faculty of Allied Health Science which was established in 2005. It drew much attention of the media as well as the professionals of health sector due to circumstances regarding its establishment. Department of Law operate within the faculty of Arts.

== Faculties of Study ==
=== Faculty of Agriculture ===
A faculty of Agriculture was established in the University of Ceylon in-order to meet the requirements of manpower for research and development of the agricultural industry in Sri Lanka. At the beginning, it functioned as the Faculty of Agriculture and Veterinary Science, together with departments of Animal Husbandry and Veterinary Science. It was only by 1973, it became a separate faculty in the University of Peradeniya. The faculty offers two undergraduate degree programs; B.Sc. in Agricultural Technology and Management and B.Sc. in Food Science and Technology. The first one is offered since 2006, replacing the traditional degree, B.Sc. in Agriculture and the latter one since 2004. Faculty of Agriculture has several sub campuses except the main campus located in Peradeniya. Agricultural Farm School is situated in Kundasale, Sri Lanka, 25 kilometers away from the faculty. Another sub campus is located in Mahailuppallama, in the North Central province of Sri Lanka. The faculty maintains two residential facilities for the students in the Mahailuppallama campus.

=== Faculty of Arts ===
Consisting of 16 academic departments of study, several institutions and a museum, Faculty of Arts is considered to be the largest faculty in University of Peradeniya. It was established with the establishment of University of Ceylon in 1942. Initially, it functioned as faculties of Arts and Oriental Studies. It had seven departments; Classics, Economics, English, Geography, History, Oriental Languages, and Philosophy. The Department of Oriental Languages was divided in 1943 into the four separate departments of Sinhalese, Tamil, Pali and Sanskrit. Academic disciplines, Law and Arabic were added in 1945, Sociology, Education and Modern Languages in 1949, Archaeology in 1959 and Buddhist Philosophy in 1964. Latest additions are Fine Arts in 2001 and Management Studies in 2002. Student enrolment in the faculty is around 3000 at present.

=== Faculty of Dental Sciences ===
The faculty of Dental Sciences was established as the Dental School of University of Ceylon in 1943. A part of the faculty was moved to Peradeniya in 1954. It became a department of the faculty of Medicine, University of Peradeniya with its establishment in Peradeniya, in 1961. In 1980, the Dental School was departmentalized into 5 departments, and in October 1986 it achieved Faculty status. Two other departments were added to the faculty in 1990 and 1997. Faculty underwent a massive change with the opening of new faculty building and Teaching Hospital on 12 June 1998.

=== Faculty of Engineering ===
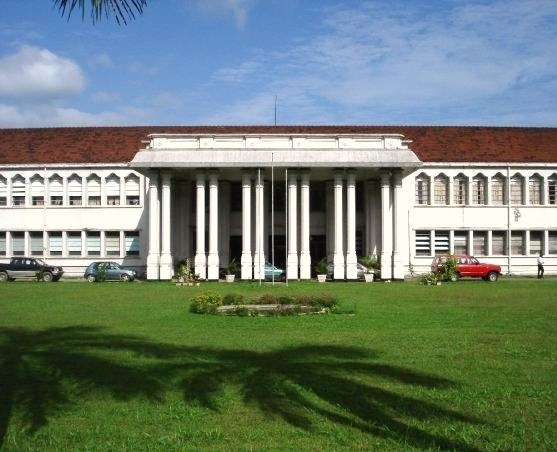
Administrative Building

Faculty of Engineering, University of Peradeniya is the oldest engineering faculty in Sri Lanka, established on 1 July 1950. It offers full-time Undergraduate Courses leading to the degree of Bachelor of Science in engineering (BSc.Eng.) and postgraduate degrees; Master of Science in Engineering (MSc.Eng.), Master of Philosophy (M.Phil.) and Doctor of Philosophy (Ph.D.). Faculty of Engineering is the host for the largest theatre in the university, E.O.E. Pereira memorial theatre.

=== Faculty of Medicine ===
Faculty of Medicine, University of Peradeniya is the second medical school in Sri Lanka, established in 1966.

=== Faculty of Science ===
Faculty of Science was established in 1961. At the beginning it had only the departments of Botany, Chemistry, Mathematics, Physics and Zoology. Admission of the students to the first batch took place in the 1961–62 academic year. Prior to that, the faculty was located in Colombo. Faculty offers general and special Bachelor of Science (B.Sc.) Degrees and several postgraduate degrees.

=== Faculty of Veterinary Medicine and Animal Science ===
Faculty of Veterinary Medicine and Animal Science was established in 1947, along with the faculty of Agriculture. Establishment of both faculties was approved by the Ministry of Education, on 5 April 1947. It was moved to Peradeniya in 1954. In 1973, the Department of Veterinary Science was upgraded to a School of Veterinary Science within a Faculty of Medical, Dental and Veterinary Sciences. By 1980, it received the full faculty status. Faculty was officially opened on 27 March 1980 with Professor S.T. Fernando as its first dean.

=== Faculty of Allied Health Sciences ===
Faculty of Allied Health Sciences is the 1st new addition to the university in 55 years, after the establishment of Faculty of Engineering. But this has drawn much attention of the media as well as the professionals of health sector due to circumstances regarding its establishment. And the controversy has not yet been settled.

== Post-graduate Institutes ==
University of Peradeniya has two postgraduate institutions.

=== Post-graduate Institute of Science ===
Post-graduate Institute of Science (PGIS) is a national institute established by the Ministry of Higher Education, Sri Lanka in 1996.

=== Post-graduate Institute of Agriculture ===
Post-graduate Institute of Agriculture (PGIA) was established in 1975. It offers four postgraduate degrees in total, namely, M.Sc., M.Phil., MBA and Ph.D. in agriculture. PGIA's Master of Business Administration (MBA) degree program was initiated in 1998 and is the first such Programme offered in Sri Lanka outside Colombo, and the third to be offered by a public university in the country.

== Senerath Paranavitana Teaching and Research Museum ==
Senerath Paranavitana Teaching and Research Museum is an affiliated institution to the Department of Archaeology, Faculty of Arts. It was established in 1960.

== See also ==
- Campus of University of Peradeniya
- List of University of Peradeniya people
