= List of University of Peradeniya people =

This is a list of notable University of Peradeniya people. This includes distinguished alumni of various fields and distinguished faculty people.

== Law, politics and international relations ==
- Sarath Amunugama MP, CCS – Cabinet Minister of Public Administration and Home Affairs; former Deputy Minister of Finance and Planning
- Ranjith Bandara, Member of Parliament in Sri Lanka
- Sirisena Amarasekara – Sri Lankan High commissioner to South Africa, Mozambique, Namibia, Zambia, Zimbabwe, Lesotho, Angola, Botswana, and Eswatini.
- Jayantha Dhanapala, SLOS – former Under-Secretary-General for Disarmament Affairs, United Nations
- Amarasiri Dodangoda – former Cabinet Minister of Public Administration and Home Affairs of Sri Lanka
- Justice Mark Fernando – former judge of the Supreme Court of Sri Lanka
- Nandana Gunathilake – former Cabinet minister of posts and telecommunications
- Dayan Jayatilleka SLOS – Permanent Mission of Sri Lanka to the United Nations at Geneva; Consul General for Switzerland
- Sri Lankabhimanya Hon. Lakshman Kadirgamar – diplomat, politician and lawyer
- Vikramabahu Karunaratne – Leader, New Left Front (NLF) and a controversial Politician in Sri Lanka
- W. J. M. Lokubandara – Speaker of the Parliament (2005–2010)
- Athuraliye Rathana Thero – Jathika Hela Urumaya MP
- Neelan Tiruchelvam – Sri Lankan Tamil politician; peace activist; academic; founder and director of the International Centre for Ethnic Studies; founder and director of The Law and Society Trust; assassinated by an LTTE suicide bomber in 1999
- Wiswa Warnapala – former Minister of Higher Education, Sri Lanka
- Harischandra Wijayatunga – leader of the Sinhalaye Mahasammatha Bhoomiputra Pakshaya; compiler of the Gunasena Great Sinhala Dictionary
- Anura Kumara Dissanayake – 10th President of Sri Lanka (dropped out)
- https://en.wikipedia.org/w/index.php?title=Madhura_Senevirathna&oldid=1298766059-Deputy Minister Of Education and higher education.

== Academics ==
=== Professors and scholars ===
- K. M. de Silva – Executive Director of the International Centre for Ethnic Studies
- Gishan Dissanaike – financial economist; Adam Smith Professor of Corporate Governance at the University of Cambridge; head of the Finance Department; Director of the Cambridge MPhil Programme in Finance
- Sucharitha Gamlath – winner of Rowland's gold medal, Jayanayake Prize and the oriental research scholarship; Trotskyist; professor in Sinhala; Dean of Jaffna University; served in the Rajarata University and Ruhunu University; scholar in linguistics; pioneering Sri Lankan Marxist critic; author of many books
- Shelton Gunaratne – Professor emeritus (Mass Communications), Minnesota State University; writer; scholar
- Amal Jayawardane – Sri Lankan historian; visiting professor at the American University; research scholar at the Department of International Relations, London School of Economics
- David Kalupahana – Buddhist scholar; Emeritus Professor of Philosophy at the University of Hawaii
- Gananath Obeyesekere – Emeritus Professor of anthropology at Princeton University; leading anthropologist; entered into an intellectual debate with Marshall Sahlins over the rationality of indigenous people through the details of Captain James Cook's death in the Hawaiian Islands in 1779
- P. D. Premasiri – Buddhist scholar; professor emeritus of Pali and Buddhist Studies at the University of Peradeniya.
- Lakshman Samaranayake – Dean of the Faculty of Dentistry (2004 -), University of Hong Kong; Tam Wah-Ching Professor in Oral Sciences; King James IV Professor, Royal College of Surgeons of Edinburgh; first Asian to receive the latter honour; first dental surgeon in Sri Lanka to receive DSc (honoris Causa) from the University of Peradeniya
- Kala Keerthi, Dharma Shastra Visharadha Kirthi Sri, Prof. Anuradha Seneviratna – scholar
- Pandula Andagama – Anthropologist; Head of the Anthropology Division, and assistant director of the National Museum of Colombo.

=== University Presidents, Chancellors and Vice Chancellors ===
- S. B. S. Abayakoon – Vice-Chancellor of University of Peradeniya; former Dean of the Faculty of Engineering, University of Peradeniya
- Sarath Amunugama – Vice Chancellor of the University of Kelaniya, Sri Lanka
- C. L. V. Jayathilake – Chancellor of the Wayamba University of Sri Lanka; former Vice Chancellor of the University of Peradeniya
- S. "Sam" Karunaratne – former Vice Chancellor of University of Moratuwa; current Chancellor of the Sri Lanka Institute of Information Technology
- Indira Samarasekara – President of the University of Alberta, Canada

=== Deans ===
- Nalin de Silva – former Dean of the Faculty of Science University of Kelaniya; commission member of UGC
- M. P. Ranaweera – former Dean of the Faculty of Engineering, University of Peradeniya

== Medicine ==
- Malik Peiris, FRS Légion d'Honneur – Tam Wah-Ching Professor in Medical Science; Chair Professor, Department of Microbiology at the University of Hong Kong; Scientific Director, HKU-Pasteur Research Centre; first Sri Lankan to be elected a Fellow of the Royal Society; discoverer of severe acute respiratory syndrome (SARS) virus; proposed the Cytokine storm theory of avian influenza

== Science and technology ==
- Anne Perera MNZM, food technologist in New Zealand

== Military and police ==
- Cyril Herath – former Sri Lankan Inspector-General of Police; Permanent Secretary to the Ministry of Defence
- Major General Janaka Perera – RWP, RSP, VSV, USP, RCDS, Psc, CR – Chief of Staff of the Sri Lanka Army; one of the most distinguished generals in Sri Lankan history
- Rear Admiral Sunil Ranjan Samaratunga – RSP, VSV, USP of the Sri Lanka Navy
- Ana Seneviratne – former Sri Lankan Inspector-General of Police; Sri Lankan High Commissioner to Malaysia

== Literature ==
- Rani Seetharan – Sri Lankan Tamil writer, essayist, and academic.
- Sengai Aaliyan – Sri Lankan Tamil writer
- Gunadasa Amarasekera – Sinhala writer, poet, and essayist
- Nihal De Silva – author; winner of International Dublin Literary Award and the Gratiaen Prize
- J. B. Disanayake – head of the Department of Sinhala, University of Colombo
- Siri Gunasinghe – sanskritist, art historian, premier Sinhalese poet, novelist, literary critic and filmmaker
- S. H. M. Jameel - folklorist and author
- Kusuma Karunaratne – first female professor of Sinhala language; first woman to secure a First Class Honours degree in Sinhala

== Film, theatre and television ==
- Gunasena Galappatty – pioneer of suspense drama in Sri Lanka
- Gamini Hattotuwegama – the father of modern street theatre in Sri Lanka
- Dhamma Jagoda – first Head of the Drama Unit at the National Television channel Rupavahini; pioneer theater and television play director and actor in Sri Lanka
- Dharmasena Pathiraja – Sri Lankan film director and screenwriter
- Somalatha Subasinghe – children's playwright; founder of the Children's and Youth Theatre Organisation
- Namel Weeramuni – playwright

== Music ==
- Tanya Ekanayaka – composer-pianist and first Sri Lankan composer to have entire albums of original music released globally by international record labels

== Religion ==
- Bogoda Seelawimala Nayaka Thera – incumbent Head Priest of the London Buddhist Vihara; current Chief Sangha Nayaka of Great Britain
- Katukurunde Nanananda Thera – Buddhist monk, scholar
- Nyanaponika Thera – German-born Sri-Lanka-ordained Theravada monk; co-founder of the Buddhist Publication Society; author of seminal Theravada books; teacher of contemporary Western Buddhist leaders such as Bhikkhu Bodhi
- Bhikkhu Analayo – German-born Sri-Lanka-ordained Theravada monk; former professor of the Numata Centre for Buddhist Studies at the University of Hamburg; Buddhist scholar, researcher and author of several influential Buddhist books including Satipaṭṭhāna, the Direct Path to Realization and Perspectives on Satipaṭṭhāna.

== Journalists ==
- Taraki Sivaram – political analyst and a senior editor for Tamilnet.com

== Civil servants ==
- Susantha De Alwis, SLOS – former Sri Lankan Ambassador to the United States, Japan, South Korea; Permanent Representative to United Nations (Geneva)
- A. S. Jayawardene, – former Governor of the Central Bank of Sri Lanka; Permanent Secretary of the Ministry of Finance & Treasury; Alternate Executive Director of the International Monetary Fund (IMF)
- Nihal Seneviratne – former Secretary General of Parliament (1981–1994); parliamentary affairs adviser to the Prime Minister
- Lalith Weeratunga, CAS – current Permanent Secretary to the President of Sri Lanka
- Wilhelm Woutersz, SLOS – former Permanent Secretary to the Ministry of Foreign Affairs of Sri Lanka; Sri Lankan Ambassador to People's Republic of China, Italy and Yugoslavia

== Faculty ==
- Seneka Bibile – founder of Sri Lanka's drug policy; medical benefactor to humanity
- K. M. de Silva – historian, chairman of the International Centre for Ethnic Studies
- George Dissanaike – former Senior Professor and Head of the Department of Physics, University of Peradeniya; Fellow of the National Academy of Sciences; past President of the Institute of Physics, Sri Lanka
- E. F. C. Ludowyk – professor of English; author
- Gunapala Malalasekera – Sri Lankan scholar and diplomat; compiler of the Gunapala Sinhala-English dictionary
- Gananath Obeyesekere – professor in sociology; emeritus professor of Anthropology at Princeton University; leading anthropologist; entered into an intellectual debate with Marshall Sahlins over the rationality of indigenous people through the details of Captain James Cook's death in the Hawaiian Islands in 1779
- Senarath Paranavithana – pioneering archaeologist and epigraphist of Sri Lanka; once the archaeological commissioner
- Anuradha Seneviratna – Sri Lankan scholar
- Stanley Jeyaraja Tambiah – professor of anthropology (1955–1960); leading social anthropologist and Esther and Sidney Rabb Professor Emeritus of Anthropology at Harvard University; recipient of the Balzan Prize, the highest recognition of the Royal Anthropological Institute of Great Britain and Ireland, the Huxley Memorial Medal and Lecture, and the Fukuoka Asian Culture Prize by the city of Fukuoka, capital of Fukuoka Prefecture, Japan; Corresponding Fellow of the British Academy

== Librarians ==
- H. A. I. Goonetilleke – director of the University of Peradeniya library; first chairman of the Gratiaen Trust; scholar

== Sportsmen and sports administrators ==
- D. H. de Silva – first class cricketer, sports administrator and coach
