= Teaching Hospital, Peradeniya =

- Ministry of Health Care and Nutrition
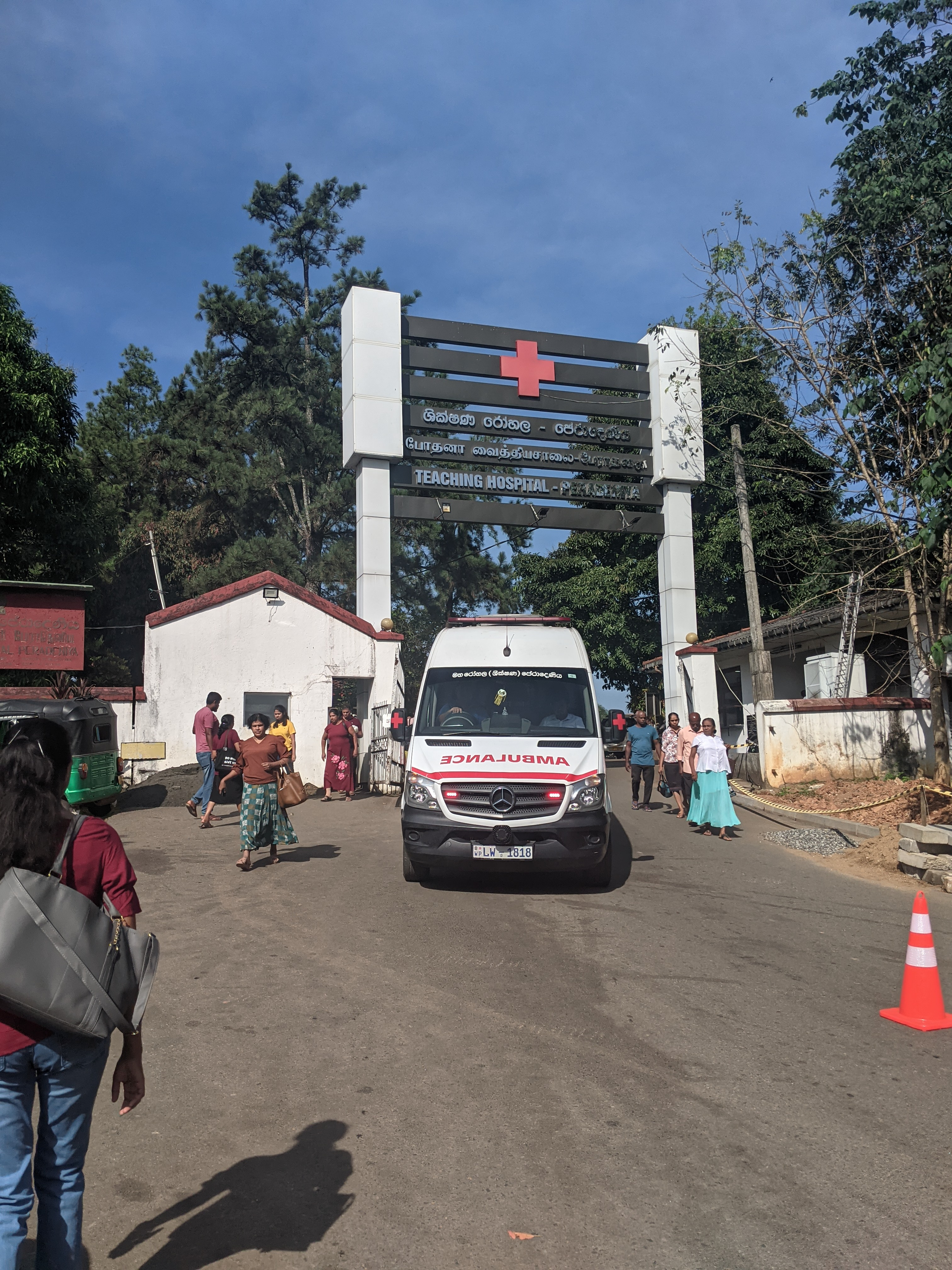

Geography
- Location: Peradeniya, Sri Lanka
- Coordinates: 7.266523°N 80.597676°E

Organisation
- Type: Teaching
- Affiliated university: University of Peradeniya

Services
- Beds: 960

Links
- Lists: Hospitals in Sri Lanka

Teaching Hospital, Peradeniya, is one of the three hospitals in Peradeniya, Sri Lanka. It is one of the leading community teaching hospitals in Sri Lanka, affiliated with the University of Peradeniya. In addition to delivering medical care to patients, it facilitates undergraduate training programmes for the university students studying in the faculties of Medicine, Dental Sciences and Allied Health Sciences. It was established in 1980.

== Location ==
The hospital is situated aside the A1 highway connecting Kandy and Colombo, near the Royal Botanical Gardens, Peradeniya.

== Administration ==
It is established and administered under the purview of the Ministry of Health Care and Nutrition, Sri Lanka. The hospital has a bed strength of 960, as of 2009. It is the second largest hospital in Central Province, Sri Lanka, second only to the National Hospital, Kandy.

== See also ==
- List of university hospitals
- Medical education
