= Legal education in Sri Lanka =

Legal education in Sri Lanka is based on the constitution and the legal framework of Sri Lanka which is mainly based on Roman-Dutch law.

The modern legal education in Sri Lanka dates back to 1833 when the Supreme Court was allowed by Section 17 of the Charter of 1833, to "admit and enrol as Advocates and Proctors, persons of good repute and of competent knowledge and ability upon examination by one or more of the judges of the Supreme Court." In 1874, the Colombo Law College was established to carry out formal legal education.

At present in Sri Lanka to practice as a lawyer one needs to be enrolled as an attorney at law of the Supreme Court of Sri Lanka. This is achieved by passing law exams at the Sri Lanka Law College which are administered by the Council of Legal Education and spending a period of six months under a practicing attorney of at least eight years' standing.

Prospective attorneys can register in the Sri Lanka Law College through an entrance exam and follow a three-year program of legal study undertaking exams on each legal subject at the end of the year. Graduates who have gain an LL.B from a local or foreign university, may gain admission in the Law College and undertake these exams without attending lectures at the Law College.

== Law schools in Sri Lanka ==
- Sri Lanka Law College
- Faculty of Law, University of Colombo
- Department of Law, Faculty of Arts, University of Jaffna
- Department of Law, Faculty of Humanities and Social Sciences, Open University of Sri Lanka
- Department of Law, Faculty of Arts, University of Peradeniya
- Faculty of Law, General Sir John Kotelawala Defence University
