= List of law schools in Sri Lanka =

This is a list of law schools in Sri Lanka.

- Sri Lanka Law College
- Faculty of Law, University of Colombo
- Department of Law, Faculty of Arts, University of Jaffna
- Open University Law School, Sri Lanka
- Department of Law, Faculty of Arts, University of Peradeniya
- Faculty of Law, General Sir John Kotelawala Defence University
