= Campus of University of Peradeniya =

College campus in Sri Lanka

The main campus of University of Peradeniya is in Peradeniya, Sri Lanka. It has an additional sub-campus in Mahailuppallama, North Central province. Other than that, several farms and agriculture-related institutions operate off the main campus and the sub-campus.

== Main campus ==
Summary of the facilities in campus
| Facility | Number |
| Number of institutes | 02 |
| Number of faculties | 08 |
| Number of academic departments | 72 |
| Number of directorates | 03 |
| Number of centres/units | 15 |
| Number of Halls of Residences | 19 |
| Number of University Quarters | 419 |
| Number of Guest Houses | 04 |
| Number of Cafeterias | 28 |
| Number of Banks | 02 |
| Number of Post Offices | 01 |
| Number of Churches | 02 |
| Number of Temples | 01 |
| Number of Mosques | 01 |
| Number of Alumni Associations | 06 |
| Number of Registered Trade Unions | 17 |
| Number of Welfare Societies | 20 |
| Main library and number of branch libraries | 08 |
| Total land extent | 1,695 acres (6.86 km^{2}) |

The main campus is in a site that touches the lower slopes of the lush mountains of Hanthana. Spanned over an area of 700 hectares, University of Peradeniya occupies the largest land area owned by a university in Sri Lanka. Moreover, there is a large number of facilities on campus to facilitate the 6000 plus students who live here. University of Peradeniya is the largest residential university in Sri Lanka. A summary of the facilities are given here.

=== Senate building ===
University Senate is the primary building. All the central administration work is done here. Offices of the chancellor and vice chancellor, main seminar rooms where the council meetings are held, are inside. The Senate building was built entirely on stone pillars, and is of great architectural value. Stone carvings on each of the hundreds of pillars intensifies its beauty.

=== Seven floor library building ===
University of Peradeniya library is adjacent to the Senate building. With more than 800,000 items, it is one of the largest libraries in Sri Lanka. The building is constructed to seven floors including a floor underground.

=== Arts faculty premises ===
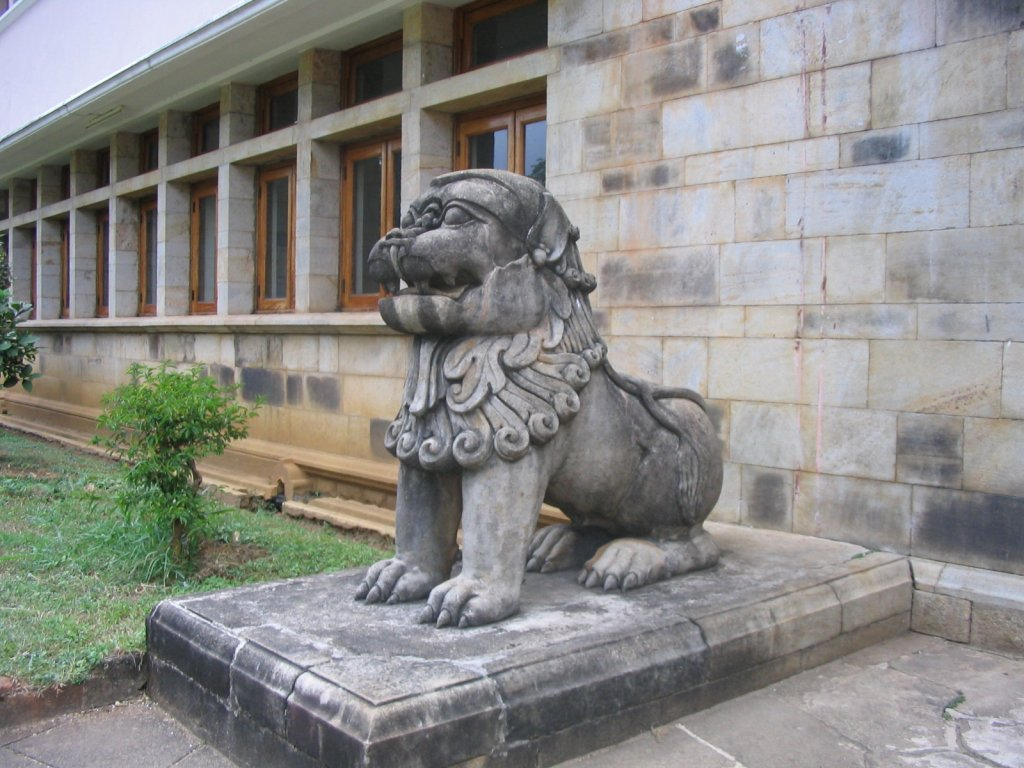
A traditional lion statue in front of the senate building of the university

The Senate building is on the Arts faculty premises. The Arts faculty spans a large area and is of a great scenic beauty. Its beauty was deeply admired by scholars such as Professor Ediriweera Sarachchandra and Professor Ashley Halpe. The famous Sarachchandra open-air theatre a.k.a. wala is in the premises.

=== Science faculty and other buildings ===
The faculty of Science and the other faculties except the faculty of Engineering are on the same side of the river Mahaweli, close to the Arts faculty premises. The faculty of Medicine is on the other side of the road of the entrance of the Botanical Garden of Peradeniya, which is a major tourist attraction of the country.

=== Hanthana range ===
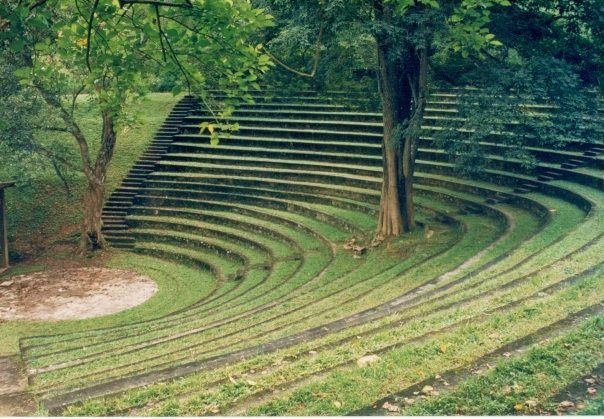
Sarachchandra open-air theatre of University of Peradeniya, a well known historical theatre and the only one of its kind in Sri Lanka. It was built according to the architectural style of ancient Greek theatres. Named in memory of Ediriweera Sarachchandra, Sri Lanka's premium playwright.

A large part of the Hanthana range is owned by the university and remains afforested. Many roads leading to the Hanthana mountains, including the famous upper-Hanthana road runs through university land. The upper-Hanthana lodge which was a tourist guest house, is now owned by the university and facilitates the faculty.

=== Engineering faculty premises ===
The faculty of Engineering is on the other side of the river Mahaweli, on a side of the main road leading to Gampola. The bridge linking the two banks is known as the Akbar bridge and considered a marvel of civil engineering. It was designed by late Prof. A. Thurairajah (Dean of the Faculty of Engineering, 1975-77 and 1982-85) and built by the 1st batch of the faculty, in the year of its inception.

The nearest railway station is Sarasavi Uyana which is on campus. Another bridge known as Yaka Paalama links the railway to the other bank. Daily shuttle bus services operate from Kandy to Galaha junction and Kandy to the university.

== Mahailuppallama sub-campus ==
A subcampus was established in 1968 at Mahailuppallama, North Central province for the Faculty of Agriculture. Separate residential facilities are available in this subcampus.

== Dodangolla farm ==
The university owns a farm near Dodangolla-Kundasale, about 25 km from the main campus. Several institutions affiliated to the faculty of Agriculture are in this facility.

== See also ==
- University of Peradeniya
