= Thalatha Wijerathna =

Sri Lankan novelist and educator

- Education: University of Peradeniya
- Occupations: novelist, writer, educator
- Known for: Little Heroes of Randeniya

Thalatha Wijerathna also spelt as Thalatha Wijeratne is a Sri Lankan children's book author and educator. She has written and published two novels for the children.

== Career ==
She graduated in science from the University of Peradeniya where she also obtained her Master of Arts in higher education. After graduation, she pursued a career as a school teacher and served as a high school teacher for over 36 years. She also served as a member of the Translator's Pool of the Official Languages Department of Sri Lanka. After her retirement, she pursued her interest in writing and publishing novels.

She published her first children's novel Game Dagakarayo in Sinhala. In 2018 she published her second novel titled Little Heroes of Randeniya. The novel was based on an adventure undertaken by 3 children - Wasantha, Samantha and Sarath - and the story revolves around how the lives of the children and their future shape the legacy of the tiny village Randeniya. It was deemed as a milestone as well as a landmark novel of young adult literature in Sri Lanka. The novel also became a finalist in the children's category of the 2019 International Book Awards.

In 2020, she published her second novel, entitled An Adventure of the Little Heroes, which was the sequel to her previous novel Little Heroes of Randeniya.
