= Faculty of Medicine, University of Peradeniya =

Medical school in Sri Lanka

- Type: Public
- Established: 1962
- Academic affiliations: National Hospital Kandy. Teaching Hospital Peradeniya. Sirimavo Bandaranaike Specialized Children's Hospital. Teaching Hospital Gampola. Teaching Hospital Nawalapitiya. Teaching Hospital Kegalle. Teaching Hospital Mawanella.
- Dean: Saman Nanayakkara
- Students: 1500+
- Location: Peradeniya, Sri Lanka
- Campus: University of Peradeniya
- Colors: Purple
- Website: www.med.pdn.ac.lk

Faculty of Medicine is one of the nine faculties in University of Peradeniya. It is considered to be one of the leading medical faculties in Sri Lanka which requires the highest entry qualification in GCE Advanced Level examination.

== Overview ==
Faculty of Medicine is situated at the Galaha Junction, Peradeniya, on the other side of the entrance to the Royal Botanical Garden of Peradeniya. In addition to the buildings located in the main campus, faculty operates a rural field practice area known as "Hindagala Community Health Project" covering 62 square kilometers and with a population of 20,000.

Departments, units and centers of the Faculty of Medicine

- Department of Anaesthesiology & Critical Care
- Department of Anatomy
- Department of Biochemistry
- Department of Community Medicine
- Department of Forensic Medicine
- Department of Obstetrics and Gynaecology
- Department of Medical Education
- Department of Medicine
- Department of Microbiology
- Department of Paediatrics
- Department of Parasitology
- Department of Pathology
- Department of Pharmacology
- Department of Physiology
- Department of Psychiatry
- Department of Radiology
- Department of Surgery
- English Language Teaching Unit (ELTU)
- Nuclear Medicine Unit (NMU)
- Health Emergency & Disaster Management Training Centre(HEDMaTC)
- Research and Development Unit
- Sport Sciences
- Medical Library
- South Asian Clinical Toxicology Research Collaboration (SACTRC)
- Peradeniya Medical School Alumni Association (PeMSAA)
- Center for Research in Tropical Medicine (CRTM)
- Center for Education, Research & Training on Kidney Diseases
- e-Library
- Technical Resources Centre (TRC)

== History ==
Faculty of Medicine is established in the University of Peradeniya in 1962 under the provisions made by the Ministry of Health. Professor Seneka Bibile; Professor of Pharmacology, who was elected Dean of this Faculty of Medicine in 1967, is largely responsible for the faculty's growth. He established the Medical Education Unit in the Faculty, which became a World Health Organization recognized teacher training center for health professionals in the South-East Asian Region. And it was in his period, the plans for the building of a teaching hospital at the Peradeniya Campus were initiated. This 940-bed hospital, Teaching Hospital of Peradeniya was completed in 1980 and does a valuable service to the area.

== Hospitals affiliated to the faculty ==
The students of the faculty of Medicine receive their clinical training at 6 hospitals currently. They are;

- Teaching Hospital, Peradeniya: Serves as the Professorial Unit for the training of final year medical students
- National Hospital, Kandy
- Sirimavo Bandaranaike Specialized Children's Hospital, Peradeniya.
- Teaching Hospital, Gampola
- Base Hospital, Mawanella
- STD Clinic, District Hospital, Katugastota
- Teaching hospital, Kegalle
- M.O.H Office Kandy.
- M.O.H Office Kadugannawa.
- M.O.H Office Peradeniya.
- M.O.H Office Doluwa.
- Specialized Chest Clinic Bogambara

== Deans of the faculty ==
- Seneka Bibile (1966-1969)
- G.E.Tennakoon (1969-1970)
- Ananda Dasan Perera Jayatilaka (1970-1972)
- B.A Jayaweera (1972-1975)
- H Ranasinghe (1975)
- R.G. Panabokke (1975-1981)
- Malcolm Fernando (1981-1984)
- V Basnayake (1984-1986)
- Malcolm Fernando (1986-1994)
- Nimal Senanayake (1994-1999)
- Malini Udupihille (1999-2002)
- Ananda Wijekoon (2002-to 2005)
- Chula Goonasekara
- I. Amarasinghe
- Gamini Buthpitiya (2010-2013)
- M.D Lamawansa (2013-2015)
- Vajira S. Weerasinghe(2015–2018)
- Asiri S. Abayagunawardana(2018-2021)
- Vasanthi Pinto(2021–2024)
- Saman Nanayakkara (2024 - present)
