= Ratnasingham Shivaji =

American mathematician

Ratnasingham Shivaji is an American mathematician, focusing on mathematics and mathematical ecology, currently the H. Barton Excellence Professor at University of North Carolina at Greensboro and formerly a W. L. Giles Distinguished Professor at Mississippi State University.

Shivaji completed his undergraduate studies, earning a Special Degree in Mathematics from the University of Peradeniya, Sri Lanka, in 1977 with a first-class honors. He obtained his PhD in Mathematics from Heriot- Watt University in Edinburgh, Scotland, in 1981.

He was included in the 2019 class of fellows of the American Mathematical Society "for contributions to the theory of semipositone elliptic questions applied to reaction-diffusion systems, for mentoring, and for providing leadership for the inception of a doctoral program in mathematics".

He received the 2024 Conference of Southern Graduate Schools Outstanding Mentor Award and the 2020 Mathematical Association of America Southeastern Section Distinguished Teaching Award.
