= Faculty of Science, University of Peradeniya =

- Type: Public
- Established: 1961
- Dean: Prof. R. G. S. C. Rajapakse
- Administrative staff: 230
- Students: 2000
- Location: Peradeniya, Sri Lanka
- Campus: Suburban
- Website: sci.pdn.ac.lk

Faculty of Science is one of the eight faculties in University of Peradeniya. It was established as the second Faculty of Science in Sri Lanka in 1961.

== Overview ==
Faculty of Science is situated about half a kilometre from the Galaha Junction, Peradeniya. Faculty consists of 110 academic and 120 non-academic staff.

== Degree Programs ==
The Faculty of Science offer undergraduate level programmes that leads to Bachelor of Science (BSc) and Bachelor of Science Honours (BSc (Hons)) degrees. It also offer postgraduate programmes leading to Master of Science (MSc), Master of Philosophy (MPhil), Doctor of Philosophy (PhD) degrees and postgraduate diplomas. Postgraduate programmes are conducted by the Postgraduate Institute of Science (PGIS), which can be considered as the postgraduate arm of the Faculty of Science.

=== Undergraduate Degree Programs ===
The Bachelor of Science (BSc) degree is a 3 academic-year (1 academic year = 2 semesters) study programme. The principal subject areas offered for Bachelor of Science study programme are

- Biology
- Botany
- Chemistry
- Computer Science
- Geology
- Mathematics
- Molecular Biology & Biotechnology
- Physics
- Statistics
- Zoology

The Bachelor of Science Honours (BSc (Hons)) degree is a 4 academic-year study programme. The subjects areas offered for Bachelor of Science Honours study programme are

- Biology
- Botany
- Zoology
- Chemistry
- Computer Science
- Environmental Science
- Geology
- Molecular Biology and Biotechnology
- Mathematics
- Physics
- Statistics
- Data Science
- Biomedical Science
- Microbiology

The following 4 academic-year study programmes in the following subject areas are also offered

- Statistics and Operational Research leading to Bachelor of Science Honours in Statistics and Operational Research.
- Computation and Management leading to Bachelor of Science Honours in Computation and Management. This study programme is no longer offered.

Additionally, a 4 academic-year study programme leading to Bachelor of Science Honours in Applied Science degree is also offered. The subjects areas this programme is based on are

- Biology
- Geology
- Chemistry
- Mathematics
- Physics
- Statistics/Computer Science

== Departments and institutions ==
The faculty consists of nine departments, six units, a separate library and the Postgraduate Institute of Science (PGIS).

Departments of the Faculty of Science

- Department of Botany
- Department of Chemistry
- Department of Geology
- Department of Mathematics
- Department of Molecular Biology and Bio-technology
- Department of Physics
- Department of Statistics and Computer Science
- Department of Zoology
- Department of Environmental and Industrial Sciences

== See also ==
- University of Peradeniya
