= University of Peradeniya library =

Library in the University of Peradeniya, Sri Lanka

University of Peradeniya Library
- 7°15′18″N 80°35′48″E
- Location: Peradeniya, Sri Lanka
- Type: Academic library
- Established: 1921
- Branches: 8

Collection
- Items collected: books, journals, newspapers, magazines, sound and music recordings, maps, prints, drawings and manuscripts
- Size: 815,000 (approx.)^{[a]}
- Legal deposit: 357,699 (as of 2008)

Access and use
- Circulation: 256,000 (approx.)
- Population served: University of Peradeniya and worldwide
- Members: University of Peradeniya (and some other groups on application)

Other information
- Director: P.E. Harrison Perera
- Employees: 18
- Website: http://www.lib.pdn.ac.lk/

The University of Peradeniya library is a centrally administered network of libraries in the University of Peradeniya, Sri Lanka. It is considered the oldest academic library in Sri Lanka and one of the largest libraries in Sri Lanka today.^{[b]}

== History ==
It was founded as the University College Library in 1921. With the amalgamation of the Ceylon University College and the Ceylon Medical College in 1942 to form the first university in Sri Lanka, the University of Ceylon, University College library became the University of Ceylon library. At the time this transformation occurred, the library contained nearly 30,000 items. The entire facility was moved to Peradeniya in 1952, with the establishment of a new seven-story building in the University of Ceylon, Peradeniya campus. The first donation to the library was the valuable and extensive collection on history, literature and oriental studies of late Arunachalam Padmanabha donated by his father Sir Ponnambalam Arunachalam. The Vol. 1 of the 11th edition of Encyclopædia Britannica was given the accession number 1.

The University of Peradeniya library has changed its name from time to time as follows:

- Library, Ceylon University College (1921 to 1942)
- Library, University of Ceylon (1942 to 1952)
- Library, University of Ceylon, Peradeniya (1952 to 1972)
- Library, Peradeniya Campus, University of Sri Lanka (1972 to 1978)
- Library, University of Peradeniya (since 1979)

The scholar H. A. I. Goonetilleke served the library as chief librarian from 1971 to 1979 and is largely responsible for its growth.

== Main Library ==
The Main Library is located in a seven-story building at the angle of the Senate Building and the Arts Block of the University of Peradeniya. This library contains nearly 300,000 books as of 2009. It serves primarily the faculty of Arts. The electronic database of the main library was created in 1992.

== Branches ==
- The Agriculture Library was created in the 1960s and was amalgamated with the Postgraduate Institute of Agriculture in 1980.
- The Allied Health Science Library was created for the youngest faculty in the university – the faculty of Allied Health Sciences – in January 2007.
- The Dental Library was created in 2008 and is the 9th and the youngest member in the university library network.
- The Engineering Library was created in 1964. A new two-story building was granted to the library in 2000.
- The Medical Library was established in 1973. It served all three Medical, Veterinary Science and Dental faculties by the 1980s, before they got independent libraries.
- The Science Library was established in a new building in 1993.
- Veterinary science students were served by the Agriculture Library up to 1973. Thereafter the Vet students were served by the Medical Library up to 1994 till the Veterinary Science library was established in that year.
- Mahailuppallama Library

== Library statistics ==
Table: Library statistics on collections
Statistics up to 31 December 2009
Library	Lending collection	Reference collection	Number of periodical titles subscribed	Audio/video material	Number of students registered	Number of staff registered
Main Library	257,789	34,865	110	648	7,466	2,409
Agriculture Library	26,110	9,800	14	188	1,376	218
Allied Health Science Library	616	786	–	14	564	38
Dental Library	466	563	11	44	229	44
Engineering Library	26,908	11,992	43	258	1,549	169
Mahailuppallama Library	1,204	239	15	38	128	4
Medical Library	4,979	17,384	23	213	1,563	268
Science Library	13,099	12,312	16	643	2,366	186
Veterinary Library	1,533	4,224	5	84	331	50
Total	332,684	92,165	242	2,130	15,572	3,386

== Special collections ==
As part of its collection of more than 430 000 volumes, the library contains printed and manuscript material from earlier times. This includes:

- Donations from A. Pathmanabha, Charles Batuwantudawe, Thomas William Rhys Davids, Rev. Rambukwelle Siddhartha, A. C. Sulaiman, Andreas Nell, Lucian Janz, E.J.Thomas, George Grierson, H.R. Hamley, Albert M. Fehring, C.W. Nicholas and George H. Wickramanayake, W. A. Silva, Henry de Mel
- Map collection (largest historical map collection in Sri Lanka)
- Ceylon Room
- Legal Deposit Materials Collection – More than 226,453 publications (excluding newspapers) printed in Sri Lanka and registered in the National Archives Department.
- Collection of palm leaf manuscripts – Over 5000 palm-leaf manuscripts, which have been catalogued, accessioned and microfilmed. It is the second largest palm-leaf manuscript collection in Sri Lanka.
- Collection of microfilms of rare materials (approximately 17,000 items)
- Collection of stamps of the world prepared by the journalist and writer Carl A. Muller.
- Bound periodical collection (7,000 titles)

== See also ==
- University of Peradeniya
- List of libraries in Sri Lanka

== Notes ==
a. Table 4.1: Number of books and bound volumes of periodicals (pp.71), published in the University of Peradeniya Hand Book 2008.
b. "The oldest academic library in Sri Lanka, founded in 1921 as the university College Library became the University of Ceylon Library in 1942 and was moved to Peradeniya in 1952. Currently it has one of the largest collections in the country, numbering more than 500,000 in volume" – International dictionary of library histories, Volume 1.
