= M. P. Ranaweera =

Sri Lankan academic

Prof. M. P. Ranaweera
- Born: Veyangoda
- Other names: Ranee, Munidasa Padamasiri Ranaweera
- Education: Phd
- Alma mater: Ananda College; University of Ceylon; University of Cambridge
- Occupation: University Professor

Munidasa Padamasiri Ranaweera also known as M. P. Ranaweera is the former Dean of the Faculty of Engineering, University of Peradeniya, Sri Lanka.

== Academia ==
Munidasa P. Ranaweera received his primary education and secondary education at Ananda College, Colombo and entered University of Ceylon in 1961. In 1965 he graduated with a first class honors degree in Civil engineering and began his career as an assistant lecturer at the engineering faculty of University of Peradeniya. Later he received a Ceylon government scholarship to enter Churchill College, Cambridge in 1966, and graduated with PhD in structural engineering, doing research on the finite element method applied to limit analysis. In 1969 he returned to Ceylon (later Sri Lanka) and assume duties as a lecturer in Civil Engineering in the Faculty of Engineering. He was promoted to Senior Lecturer in 1975. He took his sabbatical in 1976 and went to University of Leicester as a Research Fellow and from there he went to University of Illinois at Urbana-Champaign to take up an appointment as a Visiting Assistant Professor in Mechanical Engineering. He returned to Sri Lanka in 1981 and joined the University of Peradeniya as a Senior Lecturer and was promoted to Professor of Civil Engineering in 1984. He became the Head of Civil Engineering in 1987 and the Dean of the Faculty of Engineering in 1989, a post he held till 1994. He was promoted to Senior Professor in 1990 and retired in 2008, and was made Emeritus Professor of Civil Engineering. He is a Fellow of the Institution of Engineers, Sri Lanka, an Honorary Fellow of the Society of Structural Engineers-Sri Lanka, and a Fellow of the National Academy of Sciences Sri Lanka. He is also a life Member of the American Society of Mechanical Engineering. Nowadays he is working in Sri Lanka Institute Of Information Technology Department Of Civil Engineering.
