= Lakshman Samaranayake =

Sri Lankan oral microbiologist and scientist

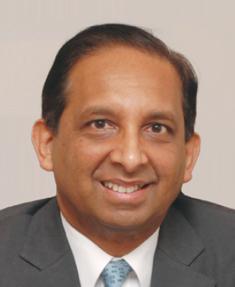
- Born: Colombo, Sri Lanka
- Education: University of Peradeniya
- Known for: Oral fungal diseases and related human mycoses.
- Scientific career
- Fields: Oral microbiology Candidiasis
- Workplaces: [University of Peradeniya] University of Glasgow; University of Alberta; University of Hong Kong; University of Queensland; Kuwait University; University of Sharjah

Lakshman 'Sam' Samaranayake (Sinhala: ලක්ෂ්මන් සමරනායක) is a Sri Lankan clinical academic with expertise in clinical microbiology and research, senior executive level administration, clinical education and pedagogy. He is best known for his work with oral fungal diseases. After serving as a Consultant Clinical Microbiologist in Glasgow, UK he joined the academia. Since then, working in five different trans-continental universities, he has authored over 500 scientific communications, cited over 37,000 occasions (h-index 106). Subsequently, he served over 12 years as the Executive Dean of two major dental schools in Hong Kong (a top five ranking dental school globally), and Australia at the University of Hong Kong and University of Queensland, respectively. He has received multiple accolades for his contributions to clinical sciences and education, including the King James IV Professorship of the Royal College of Surgeons of Edinburgh, UK, and the Distinguished Scientist Award of IADR, USA. He has held multiple visiting and honorary professor appointments in the universities of Thailand, Australia, Indonesia, India, the UK, the Middle East, and China. In addition, Professor Samaranayake is the #11 ranked clinical microbiologist in China out of 42,000+ scientists

== Education ==
Samaranayake was born in Sri Lanka and attended the Royal College, Sri Lanka for his secondary education. He then earned his Bachelor of Dental Sciences (BDS) degree from the University of Peradeniya, Sri Lanka, and received his Doctoral Degree (DDS), at the University of Glasgow, UK through research into oral candidal infections, where he served as a Consultant/ Senior Lecturer in Oral Medicine and Pathology; simultaneously he was an honorary consultant in microbiology to the Greater Glasgow Health Board, Scotland (1985–1990). He obtained his training in medical and oral microbiology, at the Glasgow Royal Infirmary, for the Fellowship of the Royal College of Pathologists, UK under Professor Morag Timbury. Subsequently, he became a member, and then a fellow of the college, by examination in clinical microbiology. He was the first dentist from South East Asia to do so, and the fourth, internationally to gain such recognition. Then he served as an associate professor at the University of Alberta, Canada (1990–1991), and Reader /Professor University of Hong Kong(1991–2013), University of Queensland, Australia (2014–2016), Kuwait University (2017–2018) and as a visiting professor at Sharjah University, UAE through invitation (2018–2020). Currently, he is a professor emeritus at the University of Hong Kong and an honorary professor at the Universities of Thailand, Indonesia, Oman, China, and Sri Lanka. Lakshman Samaranayake is a proud alumnus of the University of Peradeniya, his alma mater.

== Academic and research career ==
With an h index of 106 derived from over 500 scientific communications, and cited in the literature on more than 37,000 occasions he is amongst the top 2% of global scientist, and considered as the foremost, global authority on oral fungal diseases and related human mycoses. Additionally, he is amongst the top ten most cited scholars in the discipline of Dentistry. Professor Samaranayake is considered the top #11 ranked clinical microbiologist in China out of 42,000+ scientists

== Publications ==
=== Notable books ===
- Samaranayake Lakshman, Essential Microbiology for Dentistry, fifth edition 2019 Edinburgh, Churchill, 2011 pp 400 (Korean edition 2004; Polish Edition 2005, Portuguese Edition 2015, Chinese Edition 2015, Abridged Edition for the Al Farabi School of Dentistry, Saudi Arabia, 2014).
- Scully C and Samaranayake LP, Clinical Virology in Oral Medicine & Dentistry, Cambridge University Press, 1992; pp 489
- Samaranayake LP, Scheutz F and Cottone J Infection Control for the Dental Team, Copenhagen, Munksgaard, 1991, pp 125 (translated into French, Spanish, Portuguese, Italian and Chinese)
- Samaranayake LP and MacFarlane TW Oral Candidosis, Bristol, Wright-Butterworth, 1990, pp 266
- MacFarlane TW and Samaranayake LP Clinical Oral Microbiology, Butterworth, 1989, pp 284.

== Awards and achievements ==
He is the first Asian to be awarded the King James IV Professorship of the Royal College of Surgeons of Edinburgh for exceptionally outstanding research in dental surgical sciences (conferred in 2013) . He has received numerous awards and honors as follows:

- Recipient of the inaugural SACTD–UNESCO C2C Endowed Professorship in Teacher Development, conferred by Prime Minister Harini Amarasuriya of Sri Lanka in recognition of contributions to education, research, and teacher development (2026)
- The first Sir Lankan to receive Doctorate Honoris Causa by Her Royal Highness Princess Maha Chakri Sirindhorn of Thailand, in recognition of his global contributions to dental surgical sciences (2025)
- Hon Doctorate Award for Surgical Sciences (Yerevan Medical University after Mkhitar Heratsi, Armenia) – first Asian to be so honored (2024)
- The first health care professional from Asia to receive the coveted King James IV Professorship award of the Royal College of Surgeons of Edinburgh for services to surgical sciences
- The first Sri Lankan dental professional to receive the Honorary Doctor of Science (DSc) award from the University of Peradeniya
- The only Sri Lankan, thus far, to have spearheaded, as a Dean, the creation of a university faculty that is ranked number 1 in the World (by QS World University Rankings)
- The only Sri Lankan to be a Dean of two major University Faculties (at the University of Hong Kong and the University of Queensland, Australia)
- The first Sri Lankan dental professional to receive the Fellowship of the Royal College of Pathologists, UK
- The first Asian dentist to receive the Distinguished Scientist Award from the International Association for Dental Research
- The sole dentist from Sri Lanka to receive honorary fellowships from the Royal College of Physicians and Surgeons of Glasgow, the Royal Australasian College of Dentists, the Royal College of Dental Surgeons of Edinburgh, and the Hong Kong College of Dental Surgeons
- The first to be awarded the Tam Wah-Ching Professorship of Dental Sciences at The University of Hong Kong
- The first recipient of the SACTD–UNESCO C2C Endowment Chair for services rendered in support of the development of teacher professional capacity in Sri Lanka and South Asia (SACTD, South Asian Centre for Teacher Development)
