= Rani Seetharan =

- ராணி சீதரன்
- Born: Sri Lanka
- Education: Victoria College, Pannagam; University of Peradeniya
- Occupations: Writer, essayist, children's poet, academic, psychological counselor
- Writing career
- Language: Tamil
- Period: 2000s–present
- Genres: Short story, essay, children's literature
- Notable works: Nilavum Sudum (2010); Purang Kaich Chumai (2018)

Rani Seetharan (ராணி சீதரன்) is a Sri Lankan Tamil writer, essayist, children's poet, and academic. A former Senior Lecturer in Tamil at the National Institute of Education (NIE) and a trained psychological counselor, her literary works focus on women's mental resilience, post-war social dynamics in Eastern Sri Lanka, and psychological well-being.

== Early life and education ==
Seetharan received her early education at Victoria College in Pannagam, Jaffna District. She completed her Master of Arts (M.A.) degree in Tamil literature at the University of Peradeniya under the academic supervision of Professor Durai Manoharan.

== Career ==
Seetharan served as a Senior Lecturer in the Department of Tamil at the National Institute of Education (NIE) in Maharagama, Colombo.

Alongside her academic role, she trained as a psychological counselor. Her clinical work with women suffering from emotional trauma, domestic stress, and post-war socio-economic challenges strongly influenced the thematic focus of her non-fiction essays and short stories.

== Literary work ==
Seetharan's short stories and literary essays have been published in Sri Lankan Tamil literary journals, including Gnanam.

In November 2010, she published her short story collection Nilavum Sudum ("Even the Moon Burns"), released by Yaadhu Veliyeedu at the Colombo Tamil Sangam. The book launch was presided over by writer Padma Somakanthan, with commentary by Tamil literary critic Thelivathai Joseph and addresses by Dr. T. Gnanasekaran, Anthony Jeeva, and Prof. Saba Jayarasa.

In November 2018, she released Purang Kaich Chumai, a 170-page essay collection published by SIM Publications focusing on psychological resilience, self-reliance, and mental health among women.

In January 2024, her book Kadavulthan Anuppinaara was formally launched at the Public Library Auditorium in Trincomalee, organized by the Anbin Paadhai Ennampol Vaazhkai Arts and Literary Forum.

== Bibliography ==
=== Short story collections ===
- Nilavum Sudum (நிலவும் சுடும்) (2010, Yaadhu Veliyeedu, ISBN 978-955-97102-4-0)
- Mangalyam Thanthunee-ye (மாங்கல்யம் தந்துநீயே)
- Kanniyadhanam (கன்னியாதானம்)
- Nadukal (நடுகல்)

=== Essays and non-fiction ===
- Purang Kaich Chumai (புறங்கைச் சுமை) (2018, SIM Publications, ISBN 978-955-97102-5-7)
- Ilakkiya Katturaigal (இலக்கியக் கட்டுரைகள்)
- Kadavulthan Anuppinaara (கடவுள்தான் அனுப்பினாரா) (2024)

=== Children's literature ===
- Then Chittu (தேன் சிட்டு) – Children's poetry collection
