= Ranjith Bandara =

Sri Lankan economist, academic and politician

Hon. Ranjith Bandara
- රංජිත් බණ්ඩාර ரஞ்சித் பண்டார
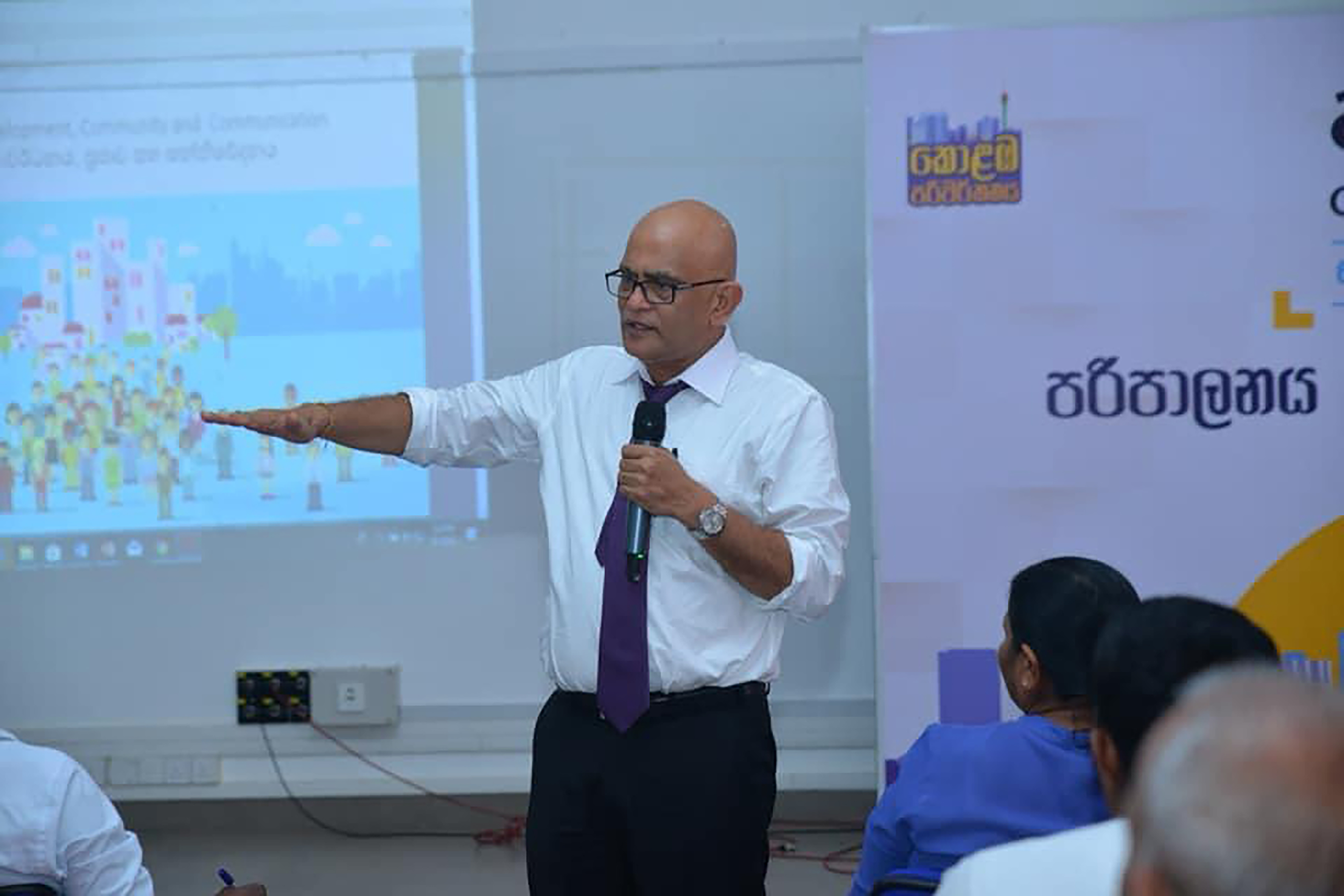

Member of the Parliament of Sri Lanka
- Incumbent
- Assumed office 2020
- Constituency: National List

Personal details
- Born: Rajapakshe Wasala Tennakoon Mudiyanselage Ranjith Bandara; 4 November 1961 (age 64)
- Party: Sri Lanka Podujana Peramuna
- Other political affiliations: Sri Lanka People's Freedom Alliance
- Education: University of Peradeniya; University of Colombo; Agricultural University of Norway; University of Queensland
- Occupation: Academic

Rajapakshe Wasala Tennakoon Mudiyanselage Ranjith Bandara (born 4 November 1961) is a Sri Lankan economist, academic, politician and Member of Parliament.

Bandara was born on 4 November 1961. He was educated at Sirimalwatte Rajakiya Vidyalaya. He has a BA degree in economics from the University of Peradeniya (1990) and a MA degree in economics from the University of Colombo (1992). He has a MSc degree in management of natural resources and sustainable agriculture from the Agricultural University of Norway (1995) and PhD in economics from the University of Queensland (2003).

Bandara was a senior lecturer at the University of Colombo's Department of Economics before becoming a professor. He has been a consultant to several Sri Lankan businesses. Following the 2020 parliamentary election he was appointed to the Parliament of Sri Lanka as a National List MP representing the Sri Lanka People's Freedom Alliance.

Bandara is the author of The Economics of Human-Elephant Conflict. He was a director on the National Livestock Development Board, Sri Lanka-Libya Agricultural and Livestock Development Company and Merchant Bank of Sri Lanka.
