= S. H. M. Jameel =

S. H. M. Jameel is an educationist, administrator, senior researcher, writer, orator, and author of several books. An Economics Special graduate from Peradeniya University studying in English medium, he obtained his master's degree in education from the University of Yaalpaanam (Jaffna). He receives training at the University of Sussex in university administration.

Jameel's professional career includes teacher, principal, education officer, assistant commissioner of examinations, first registrar of the Eastern University, State Secretary of the Ministry of Muslim Cultural and Religious Affairs, additional secretary of the Ministry of Cultural and Religious Affairs and finally as advisor to Minister of Cultural and Religious affairs. He retired from government service in 2000. Later he was principal of a Sri Lankan school in the Middle East.

Although he wrote poems and short stories in his youth, he shifted his attention to research in education, history, literature and folklore. He has published 17 books in these fields informs the compiler and adds Jameel has two translations and 11 editions to his credit. He is also a broadcaster an on radio and TV.

Her had compiled and edited 32 books. But his greatest contribution to this date perhaps is his series of publications titled “Suvadi Aatu Padai”. The four volumes in the series contain the bibliographical details of all books published by the Muslims in Sri Lanka since the printing of the first book in 1868.
