= Anuradha Seneviratna =

Sri Lankan scholar

Anuradha Seneviratna (July 13, 1938 - July 9, 2009) was a Sri Lankan scholar. He wrote many scholarly works and was a Senior Professor in the Department of Sinhala, University of Peradeniya. He has also worked in University of Colombo and was the Director of the Institute of Aesthetic Studies. He was educated at Dharmaraja College, Kandy.

He was born in Eriyagama, Kandy, on July 13, 1938, and died on July 9, 2009.

== Writings ==
Seneviratna has written nearly 70 books in English and Sinhala, the most famous being;

- Purana Anuradhapuraya: Aramika Nagaraya (Ancient Anuradhapura: The Monastic City)
- Polonnaruva, Medieval Capital of Sri Lanka: An Illustrated Survey of Ancient Monuments
- Sunset in a Valley: Kotmale
- Nana Darsana
- Anusmrti
