= Faculty of Allied Health Sciences, University of Peradeniya =

Coordinates: 7°15′15″N 80°35′48″E

- Type: Public
- Established: 2007
- Dean: Prof. Lalani Yatawara
- Undergraduates: 664
- Location: Peradeniya, Central Province, Sri Lanka
- Campus: University of Peradeniya
- Website: https://ahs.pdn.ac.lk

Faculty of Allied Health Sciences, University of Peradeniya is one of the nine faculties of University of Peradeniya and started in 2007. Faculty of Allied Health Sciences (FAHS) was inaugurated on 16 January 2007. The faculty consists of six departments conducting B.Sc.degree programmes in Medical Laboratory Science, Nursing, Pharmacy, Physiotherapy and Radiography/Radiotherapy. As the faculty offers professional degree programmes, students are introduced to basic concepts in medical sciences followed by mandatory hospital based training. All degree programmes consist of 120 credits curricula which have been designed in par with international standards. Several departments have established active foreign collaborations in teaching and research. This is the very first faculty of Allied Health Sciences in Sri Lanka.

== Programs ==
- B.Sc. in Medical Laboratory Science
- B.Sc. in Nursing
- B.Pharm
- B.Sc. in Physiotherapy
- B.Sc. in Radiography/Radiotherapy
