= Sarachchandra Open-Air Theatre =

- සරච්චන්ද්‍ර එළිමහන් රංග පීඨය
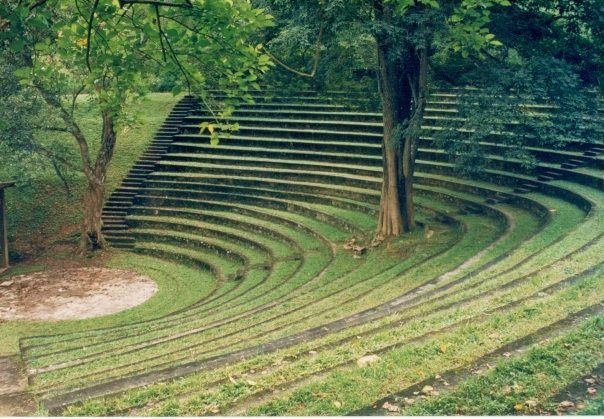
- Sarachchandra open-air theatre of University of Peradeniya, a well-known historical theatre and the only one of its kind in Sri Lanka
- Location: Kandy, Sri Lanka
- Owner: University of Peradeniya
- Type: Open-Air Theatre
- Events: Music, concerts, Theatre, Dance

Construction
- Built: 1950

Sarachchandra Open-Air Theatre (Sinhala: සරච්චන්ද්‍ර එළිමහන් රංග පීඨය) is a theatre located in the University of Peradeniya, about one kilometre from the Galaha junction in Galaha-Peradeniya road. It is popularly known as the Wala, among university students and the drama enthusiasts. Theatre is named in memory of Prof. Ediriweera Sarachchandra, a notable Sri Lankan playwright. Built in the early 1950s, it is considered to be the only theatre of its kind in Sri Lanka and was constructed according to the architectural style of ancient Greek theatres

The performance space is a simple semi-circular one in the middle, called the orchestra. Spectators sit in the stone steps created at a slope of which produced a natural theatron, literally "watching place". It can accommodate a very large number of people. Acoustics play a vital role in its construction, with the spectators in the extreme back row clearly hearing the sounds from the orchestra. Most of the dramas shown in the University of Peradeniya use Sarachchandra open-air theatre as their venue. Sarachchandra’s Sinhala play, Maname was first presented at this theatre.

== See also ==
- University of Peradeniya
- Theatre of ancient Greece
