= Faculty of Dental Sciences, University of Peradeniya =

- Type: Public
- Established: 1947
- Dean: Prof. B.M.H.S.K. Banneheka
- Academic staff: 55
- Students: 590
- Undergraduates: 580
- Postgraduates: 10
- Location: Peradeniya, Sri Lanka; 7°15′15″N 80°35′48″E
- Campus: Suburban
- Website: www.pdn.ac.lk/dental

The Faculty of Dental Sciences, University of Peradeniya is one of the nine faculties of the University of Peradeniya. It was the first institution in Sri Lanka to offer a five-year undergraduate programme leading to the Bachelor of Dental Surgery (BDS) degree. The faculty conducts both undergraduate and postgraduate programs in dental sciences.

In addition to the University of Peradeniya, an undergraduate dental program has also been established at the University of Sri Jayewardenepura, making it the second institution in Sri Lanka to offer dental education at the undergraduate level.

The only dental teaching hospital in Sri Lanka, the Peradeniya Dental (Teaching) Hospital functions as the clinical unit of the faculty. the Dental School of the University of Ceylon was established in 1943. It was moved from Colombo to Augusta Hill, Peradeniya in 1954. In 1974, Dental Schools was amalgamated into the Faculty of Medical, Dental & Veterinary Sciences of the Peradeniya Campus. This has since been reversed and the Faculty of Dental Sciences now functions independently. The teaching hospital was declared open and integrated to the faculty in 1998 as a Rs. 1.2 billion project.

== Departments ==
- Department of Basic Sciences
- Department of Community Dental Health
- Department of Oral Medicine & Periodontology
- Department Oral and Maxillofacial Surgery
- Department of Oral Pathology
- Department of Prosthetic Dentistry
- Department of Restorative Dentistry
- Department of Comprehensive Oral Health care (COHC)

== Units ==
- Dental Auxiliary Training School (DATS)
- Unit for Development of Dental Education (UDDE)
- Dental E-Learning Unit (DELU)
- English Language Teaching Unit (ELTU)

== Centers ==
- Center for Research in Oral Cancer (CROC)
- Smile train Cleft Center

== Student Organizations ==
- Dental Faculty Students' Union
- Buddhist Brotherhood Association
- Dental Faculty Arts Circle
- Anatomical Society
