= Faculty of Arts, University of Peradeniya =

Coordinates: 7°15′15″N 80°35′48″E

- Type: Public
- Established: 1942
- Dean: Prof. A.M. Navarathna Bandara
- Academic staff: 201
- Students: 3614
- Undergraduates: 2905
- Postgraduates: 709
- Location: Peradeniya, Sri Lanka
- Campus: Suburban
- Website: arts.pdn.ac.lk

Faculty of Arts, University of Peradeniya is the largest single faculty in the entire university system of Sri Lanka.

== Location ==
Foundation of Departments of the Faculty of Arts, University of Peradeniya
Department	Year Founded
Department of Classical Languages	1942
Department of English	1942
Department of Geography	1942
Department of History	1942
Department of Philosophy	1942
Department of Oriental Languages (Dissolved in 1943)	1942
Department of Economics	1942
Department of Tamil	1943
Department of Pali	1943
Department of Sanskrit	1943
Department of Sinhalese	1943
Department of Law	1945
Department of Arabic	1945
Department of Sociology	1949
Department of Education	1949
Department of Modern Languages	1949
Department of Archaeology	1959
Department of Buddhist Philosophy	1964
Department of Fine Arts	2001
Department of Management Studies	2002

Faculty of Arts is located approximately in the middle of the university's main campus. Faculty is about two kilometres away from the Galaha junction in the Galaha road. It is well known for its supreme natural beauty.

== History ==
Faculty's history dates back to the beginning of Sri Lanka's university system. Sri Lanka's first university, University of Ceylon is established in 1942 under the guidance of Sir Ivor Jennings. Faculty of Arts and Faculty of Oriental Studies were two of the 4 academic faculties in the university. They were located in Colombo at the beginning. With the establishment of the Peradeniya campus, those faculties were brought to Peradeniya in 1952. The two faculties operated separately until they were amalgamated in 1972.

== Academic programs ==
Faculty of Arts offers a number of undergraduate and postgraduate degrees.

=== Undergraduate study ===
Faculty has 16 academic departments for undergraduate study. Traditional degrees offered at undergraduate level are; Bachelor of Arts (General), Bachelor of Arts (Special) – in 18 different disciplines and Bachelor of Commerce. Other than that, faculty has started conducting two new degree programs, Bachelor of Business Administration and LLB in recent years.

=== Departments of the Arts faculty ===
Arts faculty of the University of Perdeniya has 18 departments, Units and centers. Those departments are separately established for provide course enrollments.

S.No	Departments and Units	avenue
01	Department of Archaeology	Main Arts building (MA)
02	Department of Arabic and Islamic civilization	Main Arts building (MA)
03	Department of Classical Languages	Main Arts building (MA)
04	Department of Economic and Statistics	New Arts Building (NA)
05	Department of Education	Jasuriya Building (JB)
06	Department of English	Main Arts building (MA)
07	Department of Fine Arts	A-4 Building
08	Department of Geography	Geography Building (GB)
09	Department of History	Main Arts building (MA)
10	Department of Law	A-5 Building
11	Department of Management Studies	New Arts Building (NA)
12	Department of Pali and Buddhist Studies	Main Arts building (MA)
13	Department of Philosophy and Physoclogy	New Arts Building (NA)
14	Department of Political Science	New Arts Building (NA)
15	Department of Sinhalese	Main Arts building (MA)
16	Department of Sociology	New Arts Building (NA)
17	Department of Tamil	Main Arts building (MA)
18	Post Graduate Unit	Post Graduate Building (PG)
19	English Language teaching Unit	Main Arts building (MA)

=== Postgraduate study ===
Postgraduate degrees leading to Master of Arts (M.A.), Master of Philosophy (M.Phil.) and Doctor of Philosophy (Ph.D.) and several Postgraduate Diplomas are also offered. Study programs are conducted in all English, Sinhala and Tamil media.

== Library ==
Main library of University of Peradeniya serves primarily the Arts faculty. It is one of the largest libraries in Sri Lanka containing more than 800,000 items.

== Organization ==
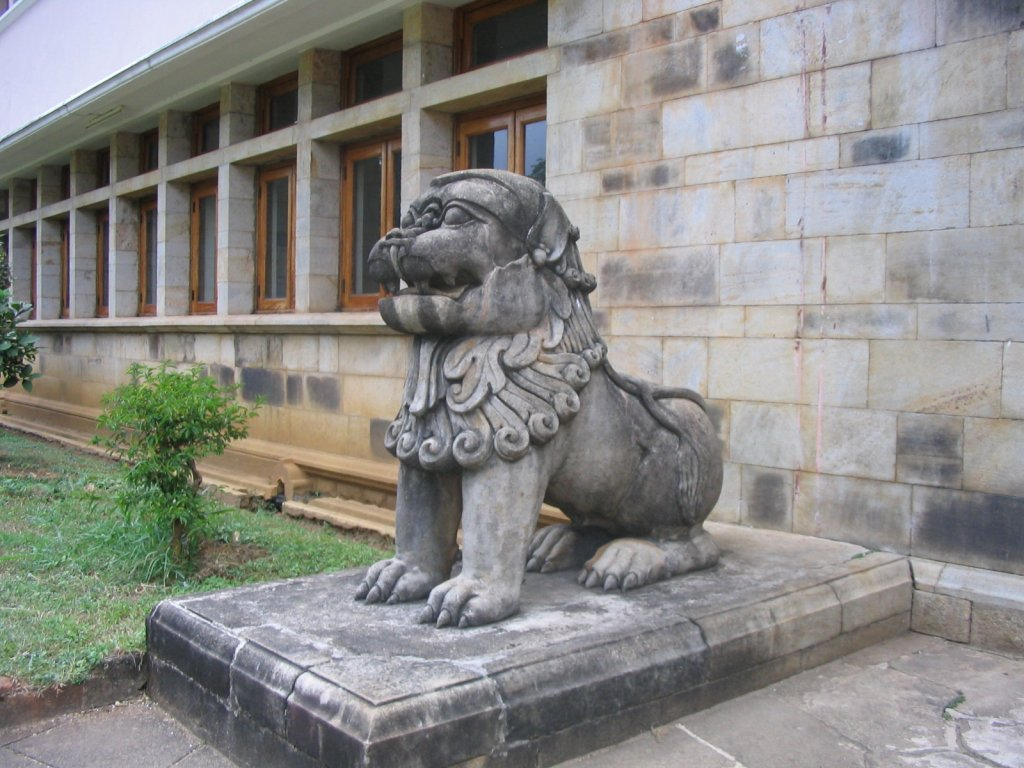
A traditional lion statue in front of the senate building of the university. Sculptures like this are all over the faculty

Dean is the head of the academic and non-academic staff. Heads of departments, the assistant registrar, bursar several other key officers work under the dean.

== Architecture ==
Faculty of Arts, University of Peradeniya is also known for its architecture. The Senate building, located within the faculty, is constructed on hundreds of stone pillars. Each of them contains traditional carvings of Sri Lanka. Other than that, the seven-floor library building and Sarachchandra open-air theatre are notable constructions within the faculty. Many traditional sculptures are seen all over the faculty premises.

== See also ==
- University of Peradeniya
