= The Law and Society Trust =

The Law & Society Trust (LST) is a not-for-profit organisation engaged in legal research, advocacy and human rights documentation. It is headquartered at No. 102/3, Bars Place, Colombo 00700, Sri Lanka. LST was founded in 1982 by the late Dr Neelan Tiruchelvam under the Trusts Ordinance. It was incorporated in 1992 under the Companies Act No. 17 of 1982 and has since re-registered as required by law under the new Companies Act No. 07 of 2007 with Registration No. GA 648.

== Mission ==
To utilize rights-based strategies in research, documentation and advocacy, and to promote the full realization of the rule of law, justiciability of rights and public accountability.

== Activities ==
The Trust designs activities and programmes, and commissions studies and publications, which have attempted to make the law play a more meaningful role within the society. The Trust also utilises law as a resource in the battle against underdevelopment and poverty and is involved in the organization of a series of programmes to improve access to the mechanisms of justice, as well as programmes aimed at members of the legal community, to use the law as a tool for social change. These include publications, workshops, seminars and symposia.

== Library ==
The LST library, comprises approximately 9,700 books, including a rare collection of early Sri Lankan legal literature and contemporary archival material, such as the New Law Reports, Sri Lanka Law Reports, Legislative Enactments, Acts of Sri Lanka, Parliamentary Debates, Law dictionaries, Encyclopedias and Government Gazettes.

The library has special collections including the Sam Kadirgamar QC collection, which was acquired in 1991, and consists of a substantial number of legal texts, Indian, English, South African, and Sri Lankan Law Reports. All the library materials in this collection are treated as reference materials and law students, researchers, and those who are interested in law are invited to use them in the library.

== See also ==
- Dr.Nissanka Wijeyeratne - founder chairman of The Law and Society Trust
- Neelan Tiruchelvam - founder and director of The Law and Society Trust
