= Galaha =

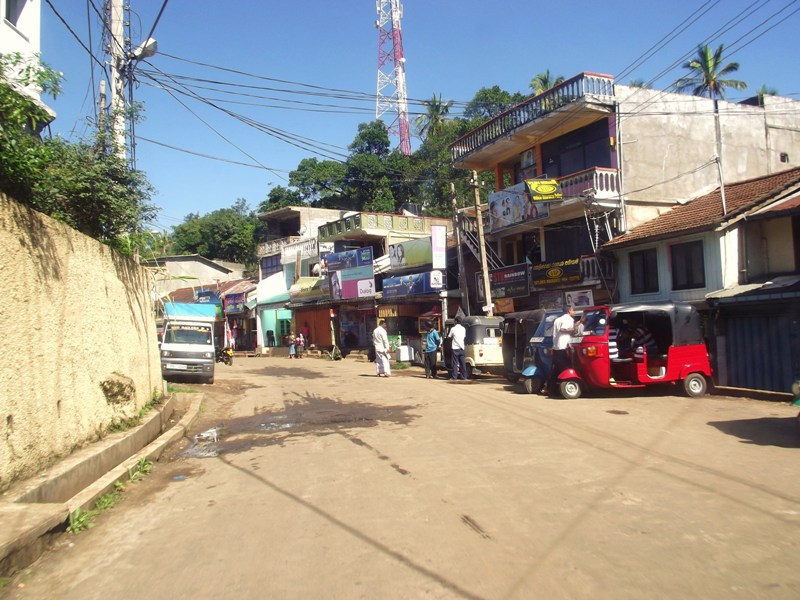

- Location within Sri Lanka
- Coordinates: 07°12′N 80°40′E
- Province: Central Province
- District: Kandy District
- Divisional Secretariat: Delthota Divisional Secretariat
- Elevation: 700 m (2,300 ft)
- Time zone: UTC+05:30 (Sri Lanka Time)
- Postal code: 20400

Galaha (Sinhala: ගලහා,Tamil: கலஹா) is a small town located in Central Sri Lanka. Situated at an elevation of about 700 metres (2,300 ft), it is one of the first tea plantations in Sri Lanka, 20 kilometres (12 mi) south of Kandy. And 19 kilometres (12 mi) from Gampola town and 5 kilometres (3.1 mi) from Deltota town.

Presently it is administrated by Deltota Divisional secretariat and Patahewaheta Pradeshiya Sabha.

Galaha is a mountain area with green hills and natural water sources. It is a cold and rainy area. A small river encircles, and provides sufficient water to the farmers, who cultivate paddy in this region. In Sri Lanka, this is one of the places, where step cultivation of paddy is done for the past several centuries. This town is surrounded by mountains, where topsoil is eroded due to the pounding rains and cultivation. And thus, reforestation program by the government, produced beautiful pine forests on them. There were several tea estates, once the profit making industry in this area, have vanished. The nearest tea factory, Galaha Group, one of the largest factories, located at the entrance to the town, abandoned and never restored. Natural minerals like Quarts and Mica are abundant in the surrounding mountains. As such there are no guest houses or lodging available in this town, however, there is a nice resort near Nillambe, a six km far. The town has a Vihara, a Hindu temple, a Mosque, and a Church.

This town provides everything to its inhabitants. There is a Petrol station and a restaurant, opposite to each other. There also a well maintained government hospital. Economy of this place is depending on the Middle East Employments, agriculture, government jobs and business.

Notable places near the town are Badrawathi Buddhist monk hospital, temple and sacred mountain, meditation center in Nillambe, Rosa thiruwana rock, Belwood Saundarya nikethanaya, the 1st Tea estate of Sri Lanka the Loolkandura Estate, Forest and Sir James Taylor Tea museum, and the Mountain reef.

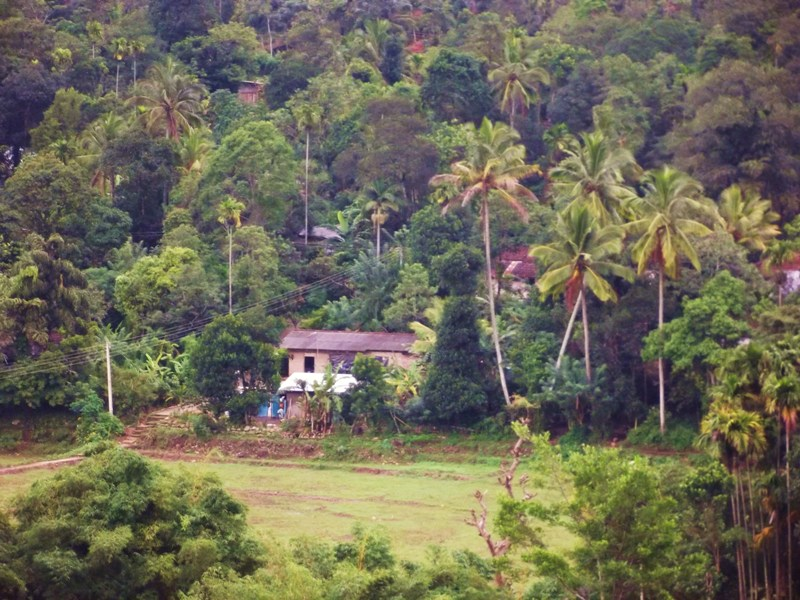
Country side of Galaha town, surrounded by the coconut trees and paddy fields

== Post and telephone ==
- Sri Lanka 00 94
- Area code 081
- Postal code 20420
