= University of Peradeniya =

Public university in Kandy, Sri Lanka

Coordinates: 7°15′15″N 80°35′48″E

- පේරාදෙණිය විශ්වවිද්‍යාලය பேராதனைப் பல்கலைக்கழகம்
- University of Peradeniya Crest
- Motto: सर्वस्य लोचनं शास्त्रम् (Sarvasya Locanam Sastram) (Sanskrit)
- Motto in English: Knowledge is the Eye Unto All
- Type: Public research university
- Established: 1942; 84 years ago University of Ceylon; 1972; 54 years ago University of Sri Lanka, Peradeniya Campus; 1978; 48 years ago University of Peradeniya
- Accreditation: University Grants Commission
- Academic affiliations: Association of Commonwealth Universities
- Endowment: LKR 2.265 billion ≈ US$ 6.3 million
- Chancellor: M.A.K.L Dissanayake
- Vice-Chancellor: W. M. T. Madhujith
- Faculty: 731
- Administrative staff: 2,973
- Students: 11,065 ^{[a]}
- Undergraduates: 9,605 ^{[b]}
- Postgraduates: 1,440 ^{[c]}
- Location: Peradeniya, Sri Lanka
- Campus: Suburban, 700 ha (1,700 acres)
- Publication(s): Ceylon Journal of Science; Sri Lanka Journal of Humanities and Social Sciences; Sri Lanka Journal of Forensic Medicine, Science & Law
- Colours: Gold & maroon
- Website: pdn.ac.lk

The University of Peradeniya (Sinhala: පේරාදෙණිය විශ්වවිද්‍යාලය, Tamil: பேராதனைப் பல்கலைக்கழகம்) is a public university in Sri Lanka, funded by the University Grants Commission. It is the largest university in Sri Lanka, which was originally established as the University of Ceylon in 1942. The university was officially opened on 20 April 1954, in the presence of Queen Elizabeth II, by Prince Philip, Duke of Edinburgh. It is located in a suburb of the city of Kandy called Peradeniya.

The University of Peradeniya hosts nine faculties, four postgraduate institutes (including the newly added Postgraduate Institute of Medical Sciences), 20 centres and units, 73 departments, and teaches about 12,000 students in the fields of Medicine, Agriculture, Arts, Science, Engineering, Dental Sciences, Veterinary Medicine and Animal Science, Management, and Allied Health Sciences. It claims to have the largest government endowment by a higher education institution in Sri Lanka, based on its large staff and faculties/departments.

== Location ==
The university is in the Central Province, 8 km (5.0 mi) from the centre of Kandy (the historic capital of the last kingdom of Sri Lanka) and about 110 km (68 mi) from Colombo. The Botanic Gardens of Peradeniya is close by.

The university spans nearly 700 ha (1,700 acres) in the Mahaweli flood plain. Most of the area remains afforested. The climate around the university is mild, and the temperature fluctuates between 18 and 30 °C (64 and 86 °F).

The main entrance to the university is through Galaha road. The Faculty of Engineering is on one side of the Mahaweli River and all other faculties are on the other side. The Akbar bridge links the two banks of the river. Considered as a marvel of civil engineering, it was designed by A. Thurairajah (Dean of the Faculty of Engineering, 1975–77 and 1982–85), and built by the first batch of the faculty, in the year of its inception.

The Sarasavi Uyana railway station is on campus. Another bridge known as Yaka Paalama links the railway to the other bank. Daily shuttle bus services operate from Kandy to Galaha junction and Kandy to the university.

A separate sub-campus was established in 1968 at Mahailuppallama, North Central province for the Faculty of Agriculture. Separate residential facilities are provided to this sub-campus.

== History ==
=== Beginnings ===
The proposal for the establishment of University of Ceylon, the first university of Sri Lanka (the predecessor of the University of Peradeniya) goes back to 1899. But no progress was seen until the formation of the Ceylon University Association in 1906 under the guidance of Sir Ponnambalam Arunachalam, Sir James Peiris and Sir Marcus Fernando. Its request for a European-style university in Sri Lanka was partially granted by the British rulers with the formation of Ceylon University College on 1 January 1921.

The University Council, through which the administration of the Ceylon University College was done, appointed committees to plan the academic activities of a future university. It made suggestions to build the university in Bullers Road (now Bauddhaloka Mawatha) in Colombo, but it was disputed by politicians. To resolve the conflict, the then Governor Hugh Clifford appointed a committee headed by Justice M. T. Akbar on 20 December 1926. It suggested that the proposed university should be unitary, residential and outside Colombo. Another committee was appointed in 1928 with Sir Walter Buchanan-Riddel as chairman. The committee initially proposed a site at Uyanawatta, in the Dumbara Valley close to Kandy. H. B. Lees, the Director of Public Works however proposed Mavilmada and Austin Woodeson, the Chief Architect recommended Aruppola, both on the Kandy side of the Dumbara Valley as better sites than Uyanawatta. Samuel Chelliah Paul and Andreas Nell pointed out the disadvantages of those sites and proposed a larger one at Peradeniya.

In 1938 the government acquired the plot and developed an area about 150 ha (370 acres) (out of 700 ha (1,700 acres)) to create the University Park.

Although the site was acquired, no plans were made to establish the university until 1941. With the arrival of Sir Ivor Jennings, as the second principal of the Ceylon University College, establishment plans were put into effect. He stressed the urgent need to move the university to Peradeniya to the Minister of Education C. W. W. Kannangara and took the initiative in the process. Thus he is considered the forefather of the University of Peradeniya.

=== 1942 to 1952 ===
First Chancellor and Vice Chancellor

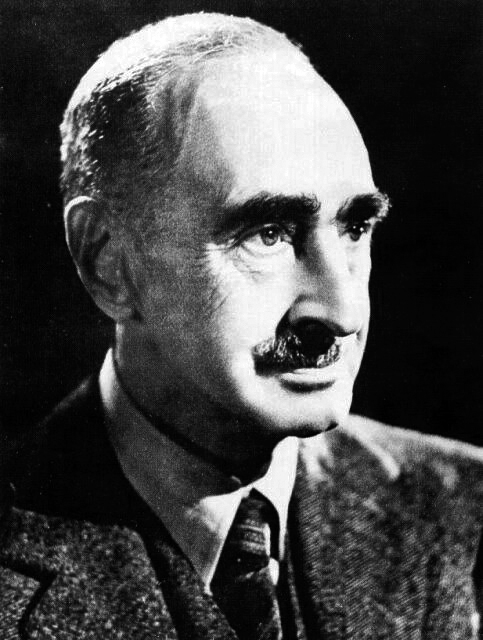
His Excellency Sir Andrew Caldecott
Chancellor

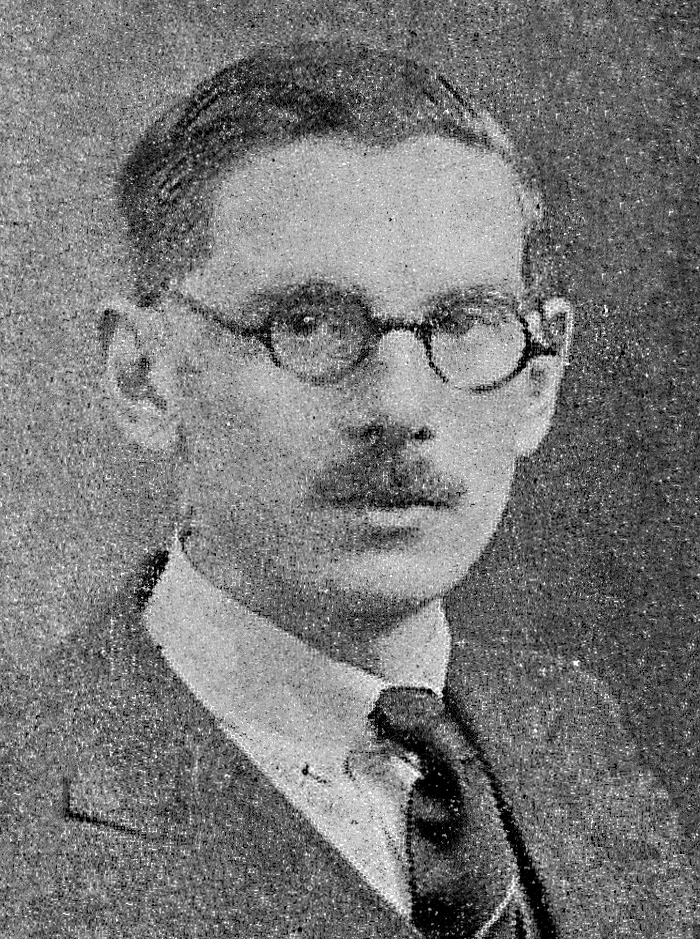
Sir Ivor Jennings
Vice-Chancellor

In 1942, the University of Ceylon was created as the first unitary, residential, and autonomous university in Sri Lanka with its seat in Peradeniya, amalgamating Ceylon University College and the Medical College into a single unit with 55 academic staff members, 904 students in four faculties. But due to World War II, the construction of buildings started in 1946. Until then, the lectures and laboratory classes were conducted in the buildings obtained from the Ceylon University College and the Ceylon Medical College in Colombo.

Consultants Sir Patrick Abercrombie and Clifford Holliday did the planning and layout of the university complex. The first phase of work constituted only the development of the left bank. The building of a bridge across the Mahaweli River, later known as the 'Akbar bridge', was planned by A Thurairajah. Transfer of the first batch of students, students from the Departments of Law and Agriculture and the third and fourth-year students of the Department of Veterinary Science, from Colombo to Peradeniya took place in 1949. Another major move took place in 1952, with the transfer of staff and students of the Faculties of Arts and Oriental Studies, together with the Main Library and the University Administration. This movement on 6 October 1952 marks the official establishment of the University of Ceylon, Peradeniya. In the initial stages, vice chancellor Jennings wanted to model British universities but met with resistance from students who opposed the changes.

A special convocation of the University of Ceylon was held on 12 February 1948 at the temporary Convocation Hall in Peradeniya.His Royal Highness Prince Henry, Duke of Gloucester laid the foundation stone for the convocation hall at Peradeniya on this occasion. Minister of Transport and Works John Kotelawala while inviting the Royal Highness mentioned that the ideal of many educated Ceylonese to have a University in appropriate surroundings is now being realized. It will be an inspiration for generations to come. HRH The Duke of Gloucester received the honorary degree of the University of Ceylon as the first in the roll of distinguished graduates in Peradeniya and shared the honors of this convocation with Prime Minister D.S. Senanayake and Andreas Nell who first suggested that the University be established in Peradeniya.

We are all aware of the great influence which the environment plays in the education of young men and women. On this site, you have the opportunity of building a University unique in character and suited to the genius of the people of Ceylon

— His Royal Highness Prince Henry, Duke of Gloucester addressing the graduation ceremony, 12 February 1948

=== 1952 to 1972 ===
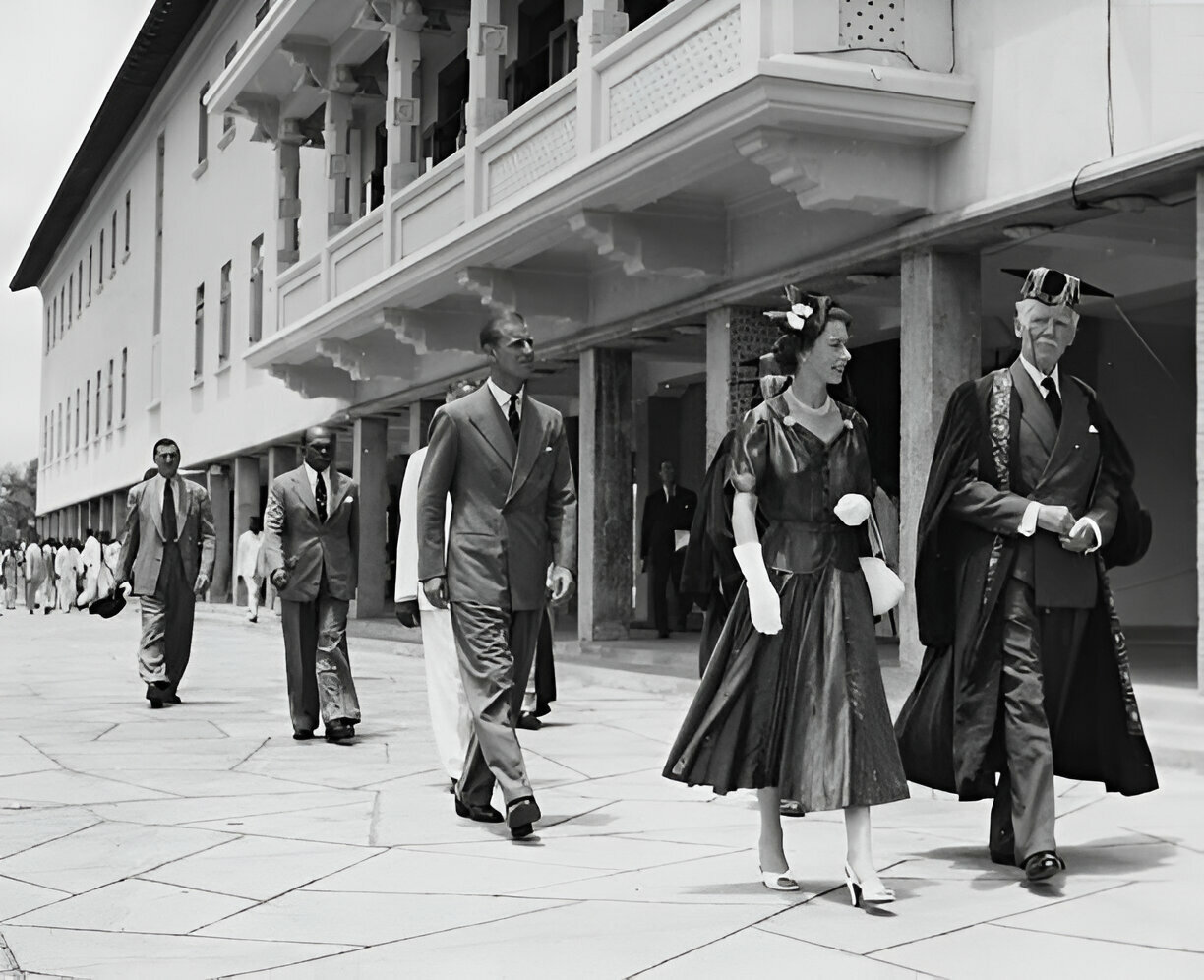
The Queen, Duke and Lord Soulbury touring the University

Although the buildings at Peradeniya were established in 1952, the official ceremony for its inception was held on 20 April 1954, with the participation of Queen Elizabeth II. The government of Ceylon was keen to postpone the ceremony until Queen Elizabeth II could participate. Her visit was delayed by the death of King George VI. During the Royal visit of Ceylon in 1954 His Royal Highness Prince Philip, Duke of Edinburgh declared open the university in the presence of Her Majesty Queen Elizabeth II and His Excellency The Lord Soulbury, Governor General of Ceylon.

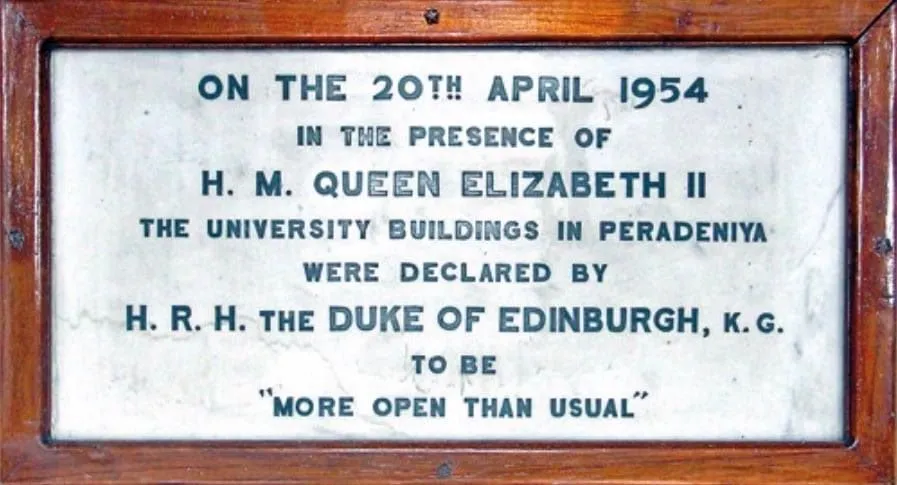
Ceremonial opening plaque of the University of Peradeniya

You have remarked Mr. Chancellor, that it is not easy to open a university, because once established it is always open. However, like the shopkeepers of London during the bombing, I can declare this place to be "more open than usual...

His Royal Highness Prince Philip, Duke of Edinburgh addressing the opening ceremony, 1954

The plaque displayed in remembrance of the proud visit of the Queen and the Duke of Edinburgh in the Senate building built on 130 granite columns is a resemblance of a historical palace from the Polonnaruwa era.

Sections of the University of Ceylon functioned in Colombo and Peradeniya acted as campuses of the same university until 1967. In 1967, these campuses were split into two. The section in Peradeniya was known as the University of Ceylon, Peradeniya, while the section in Colombo was known as the University of Ceylon, Colombo.

=== 1972 to 1978 ===
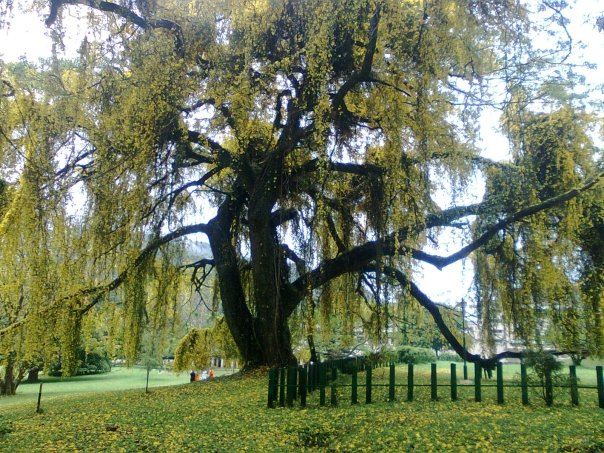
The university in spring, the Senate building.

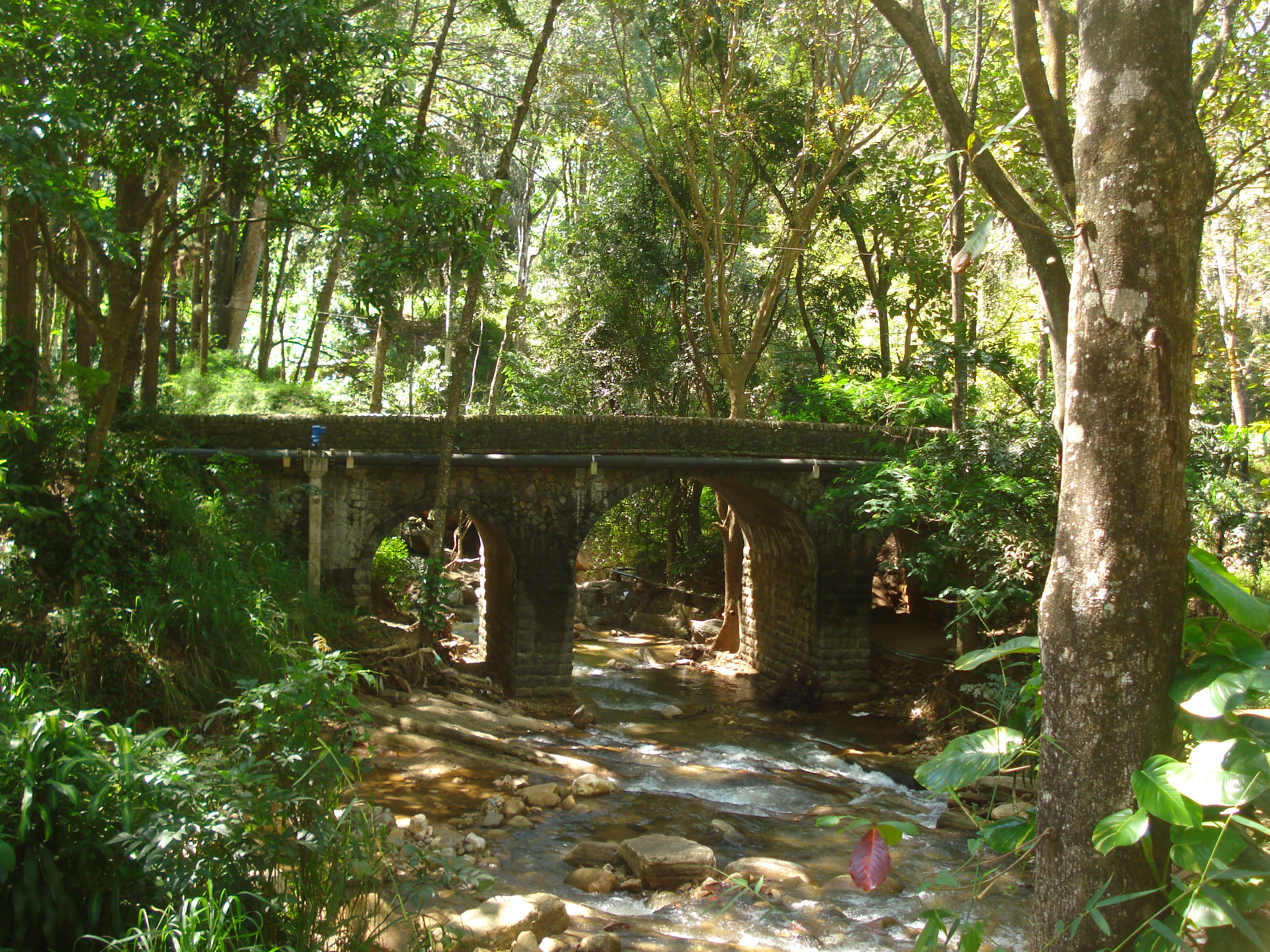
A bridge inside the university.

By the University Act No. 1 of 1972, four universities functioned a — Peradeniya, Colombo, Vidyodaya and Vidyalankara and the Ceylon College of Technology, Katubedda, Moratuwa became five constituent campuses of a single structure – the University of Sri Lanka. It had one vice chancellor and five presidents for five campuses. Under this designation, the University of Ceylon – Peradeniya became the University of Sri Lanka – Peradeniya Campus. This designation prevailed until 1978.

=== 1978 to the present ===
Under the Universities Act No. 16, 1978, the University of Sri Lanka was split into six independent, autonomous institutions as the University of Peradeniya, University of Colombo, University of Sri Jayewardenepura, University of Kelaniya, University of Moratuwa and University of Jaffna. This Act brought back some of the central features of the Ceylon University Ordinance of 1942 such as the senates, the councils and courts.

== Governance and administration ==
The University of Peradeniya operates under the provisions of the Universities Act No. 16 of 1978 and the Universities (Amendment) Act No. 7 of 1985. It is a state university and the undergraduate study is 100% free. Therefore, it depends on the government for much of its annual grant, which is provided by the University Grants Commission (UGC). Due to this, its administration is heavily influenced by the UGC. The administration is based upon that of the former University of Ceylon consisting of a dual structure of bodies: the council (formally known as the University Court which is the governing body) and the Academic Senate (academic affairs).

=== Officers ===
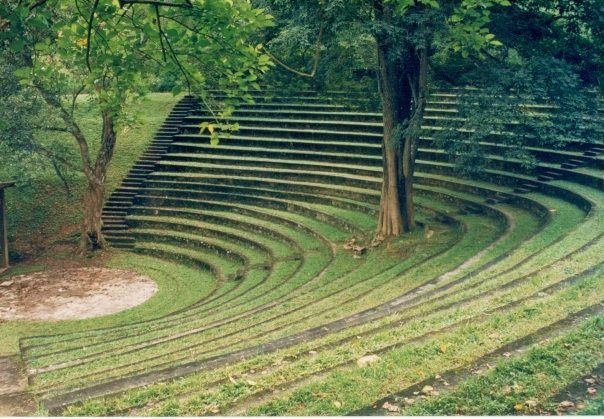
Sarachchandra open-air theatre of the University of Peradeniya, a well-known historical theatre and the only one of its kind in Sri Lanka. It was built according to the architectural style of ancient Greek theatres and named in memory of Ediriweera Sarachchandra, Sri Lanka's premium playwright.

Chancellor

The chancellor is the head of the university and is responsible for awarding all the academic degrees. Usually, the chancellor is a distinguished person in an academic discipline. Otherwise, it is a member of the clergy or a distinguished person from civil society. The President of Sri Lanka appoints the chancellor. The position is mainly ceremonial and duties are usually carried out by the vice-chancellor. The current chancellor of the university is M.A.K.L Dissanayake.

Vice chancellor

The vice chancellor is the de facto principal academic and administrative officer of the university, responsible for management tasks. This appointment is also done by the President of Sri Lanka. The current vice chancellor is W.M.T Madhujith, who is also a Professor of Food Science.

Deans of Faculties

Deans are the heads of the faculties. They are responsible for the management and the tasks carried out by the faculty. Deans are appointed by the chancellor for three years.

=== List of chancellors and vice chancellors ===
- Chancellors
  University of Ceylon and University of Sri Lanka
  - Sir Andrew Caldecott [1942–44]
  - Sir Henry Monck-Mason Moore (1944–49)
  - Lord Soulbury (1949–54)
  - Sir Oliver Goonetilleke (1954–62)
  - William Gopallawa (1962–78)
  University of Peradeniya
  - J. R. Jayewardene (1978 – July 1979)
  - Victor Tennekoon (1979 – 31 January 1984)
  - T. B. Panabokke (1 Feb 1984–1989)
  - Fredrick de Silva (1990–1993)
  - Prof. Ediriweera Sarachchandra (1993 to 1996)
  - Prof. R. G. Panabokke (1999 to 2002)
  - Deshamanya R. K. W. Goonesekera (2002 to 2006)
  - Dr. Premadasa Udagama (2007 to 2012)
  - Prof. P. W. Epasinghe
- Vice Chancellors
  University of Ceylon
  - Prof. Sir Ivor Jennings (1942–55)
  - Prof. Sir Nicholas Attygalle (1955–66)
  University of Ceylon, Peradeniya
  - S. J. Walpita, CCS (1966–68)
  - M. J. Perera, CCS (1968–69)
  - Prof. E.O.E. Pereira (1969–71)
  University of Sri Lanka
  - Prof.B. A. Abeywickrema (1972–74)
  - L. H. Sumanadasa (1974)
  - Prof. P. P. G. L. Siriwardena (1974–78)
  - Prof. S. Kodikara (president, Peradeniya Campus)
  - Prof. P. W. Vithanage (president, Peradeniya Campus)
  University of Peradeniya
  - Prof. B. L. Panditharatne (1978–84)
  - Prof. M. A. Fernando (1984–85)
  - Prof. R. G. Panabokke (1985–88)
  - Prof. A. P. R. Aluwihare (1988–89)
  - Prof. C. L. V. Jayathilake (1989–91)
  - Prof. J. M. Gunadasa (1991–94)
  - Prof. C. M. Madduma Bandara (1994–97)
  - Prof. R. A. L. H. Gunawardana (1997–00)
  - Prof. Kapila Gunasekara (2000–06)
  - Prof. Harishchandra Abeygunawardena (2006–09)
  - Prof. S. B. S. Abayakoon (2009–12)
  - Prof. A. Senaratne (2012–15)

== Faculties and institutions ==
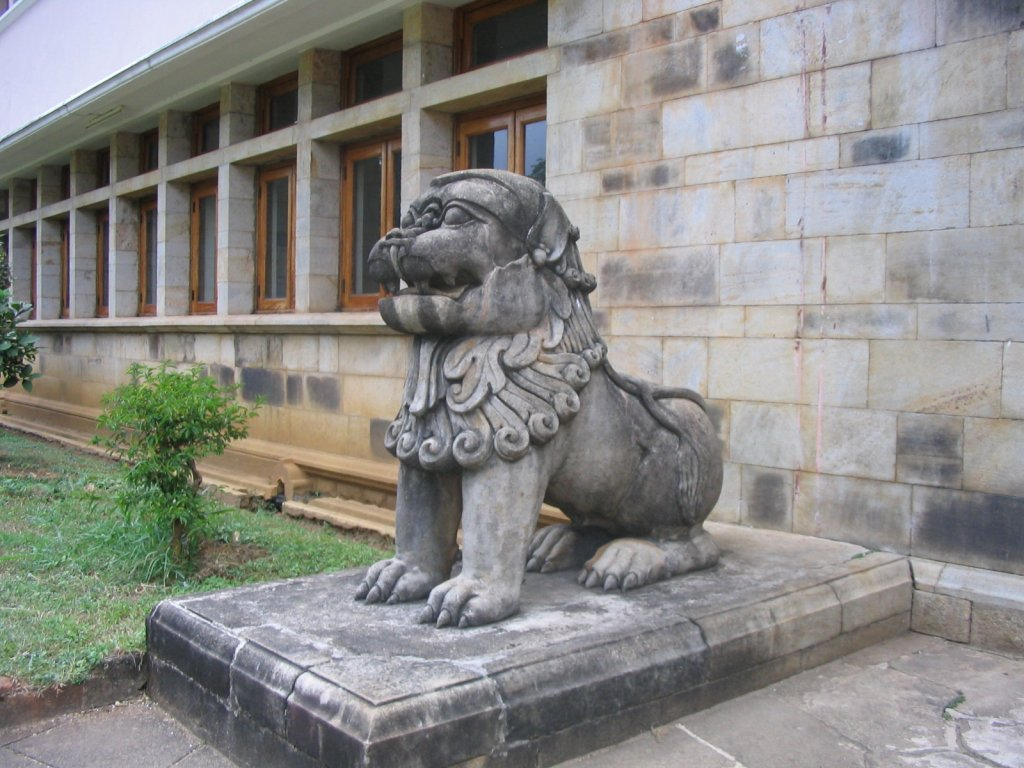
A traditional lion statue in front of the senate building of the university

Founding of the Faculties of the University of Peradeniya
Faculty	Year founded
Faculty of Arts	1942
Faculty of Medicine	1962
Faculty of Science	1961
Faculty of Dental Sciences	1943
Faculty of Agriculture	1947
Faculty of Veterinary Medicine and Animal Science	1947
Faculty of Engineering	1950
Faculty of Allied Health Sciences	2005
Faculty of Management	2015

The university has eight academic faculties of study. These faculties contain 72 departments. In addition, the university has two postgraduate institutions and six affiliated centres. The first Faculty to be established was the Faculty of Arts. The Departments of Law and Oriental Studies functioned separately but have since come under the Faculty of Arts. Since then, eight other faculties have been added. The latest addition is the Faculty of Management, established in 2015.

The Postgraduate Institute of Agriculture (PGIA) and Postgraduate Institute of Humanities and Social Sciences (PGIHS) and Postgraduate Institute of Medical Science (PGIMS) and Postgraduate Institute of Science (PGIS) are the institutions established in the university. PGIS is a national institute established by the Ministry of Higher Education, Sri Lanka in 1996. PGIA was established in 1975 and offers three postgraduate degrees. PGIA offers postgraduate-level courses in Agricultural disciplines. In addition to these institutions, Senerath Paranavitana Teaching and Research Museum functions affiliated with the Department of Archaeology, Faculty of Arts. It was established in 1960.

== Ranking ==
In 2023, Times Higher Education World University Rankings placed the University of Peradeniya first in Sri Lanka and 301–400 band in the world university ranking. This is the highest world ranking that any university in Sri Lanka has reached in recent history. The University of Peradeniya has also been ranked first in Sri Lanka under other popular university rankings schemes such as Times Higher Education world university rankings, QS world university rankings and U.S. News & World Report global university ranking in 2022. In 2019–2020, according to the University Ranking by Academic Performance (URAP), the University of Peradeniya ranked first in Sri Lanka and 1123rd in the world. The University of Peradeniya was ranked No. 1 in Sri Lanka based on total ResearchGate scores. The QS World University Rankings ranked the university 350th in Asia in 2025.

Global-Overall
Ranking Methods	Ranking
THE	1001–1200
QS	1201-1400
U.S. News & World Report	901

National-Overall
Ranking Methods	Ranking
THE	1
QS	1
U.S. News & World Report	1

Other-Overall
Ranking Methods	Ranking
THE- Asia University Rankings	93
QS- Asia University Rankings	351-400
THE- Emerging Economies	113
U.S. News & World Report- Asia	240

== Library network ==
The library is a centrally administered network of libraries. It is considered the oldest academic library in Sri Lanka.^{[d]} Containing over 430,000 items, it is one of the largest libraries serving the country. Seven branches are in faculties in the main campus at Peradeniya and one other branch is in the Mahailuppallama sub-campus.

University of Peradeniya library contains a legal deposit collection of 300,000 items, a special collection of 15,000+ items acquired from various individuals, palm-leaf manuscript collection of approximately 5,000 (second largest in Sri Lanka) and a microfilm collection of 17,000. Furthermore, it owns the largest historical map collection in Sri Lanka.

== Student life ==
=== Student organizations ===
Students at the University of Peradeniya run over 100 clubs and organizations. These include cultural and religious groups, academic clubs, and common-interest organizations. The Peradeniya Students' Union (PSU) is considered the highest body which represents all internal students. Separate student unions operate in each faculty. These student societies include:

- Agriculture Students Union (AgSU)
  - Agriculture Faculty English Literary Association (AFELA)
  - Agriculture Management Science Society (AGMAG)
- Agriculture Faculty Forestry Society
  - Agriculture Faculty Journalism and Media Society (AFJM)
  - Arts Circle – Faculty of Agriculture
  - International Students' Forum (ISF), University of Peradeniya
  - Inventors Club – Faculty of Agriculture
  - Nature Society
  - Horticulture Society
  - Society of Food Science and Technology
  - Biology Guild
- Arts Students Union (ASU)
- Science Students Union (SSU)
- Engineering Students Union (ESU)
- Dental Faculty Students Union (DFSU)
- Medical Faculty Students' Union (MFSU)
- Societies in the Faculty of Engineering
  - Engineering Students' Publication Society (ESPS)
  - Association of Computer Engineering Students (ACES)
  - Civil Engineers Society (CES)
  - Chemical Engineering Students Society (ChESS)
  - Electrical and Electronic Engineers Society (EEES)
  - Engineering Faculty Art Circle
  - Engineering Faculty Buddhist Brotherhood
  - Mechanical Engineers Society (MES)
  - Production Engineering Students Society (PESS)
  - Power and Highvoltage Engineers Society (PHES)
- Societies in the Faculty of Science
  - Art Circle
  - Buddhist Brotherhood Faculty of Science
  - Botanical Society
  - Chemical Society
  - Computer Society University of Peradeniya (CSUP)
  - Hantana Conservation Society
  - Hindu Society
  - Mathematics Society
  - Photographic Society
  - Physical Society
  - Science Library Club
  - Tamil Sangeetha Natya Sangam
  - Tamil Society
  - University Explorers Club
  - University Geological Society
  - Zoologists' Association
- Cultural Societies
  - Ceylon University Dramatic Society (DramSoc)
  - English Literary Association (ELA)
  - Film Society (FilmSoc)
  - Gandarwa Sabhawa
  - Sinhala Natya Mandalaya
  - Sinhala Sangamaya
  - Tamil Sangeetha Natya Sangam
  - Tamil Society
- Religious Societies
  - Buddhist Brotherhood
  - Hindu Students' Union
  - Newman Society (for Roman Catholics)
  - Student Christian Movement
  - University Buddhist Society
  - University Muslim Majlis
- Other Societies
  - AIESEC in University of Peradeniya
  - Arunachalum-Hall Alumni Association
  - MIDI Group
  - "Perabeats – Expected the Unexpected". Archived from the original on 7 June 2019.
  - Rotaract Club
  - Sports Council
  - Student Meditation Society
  - University Explorers' Club
  - University Gavel Club
  - University Radio Voice of hanthana https://voiceofhanthana.com/

=== Sports ===
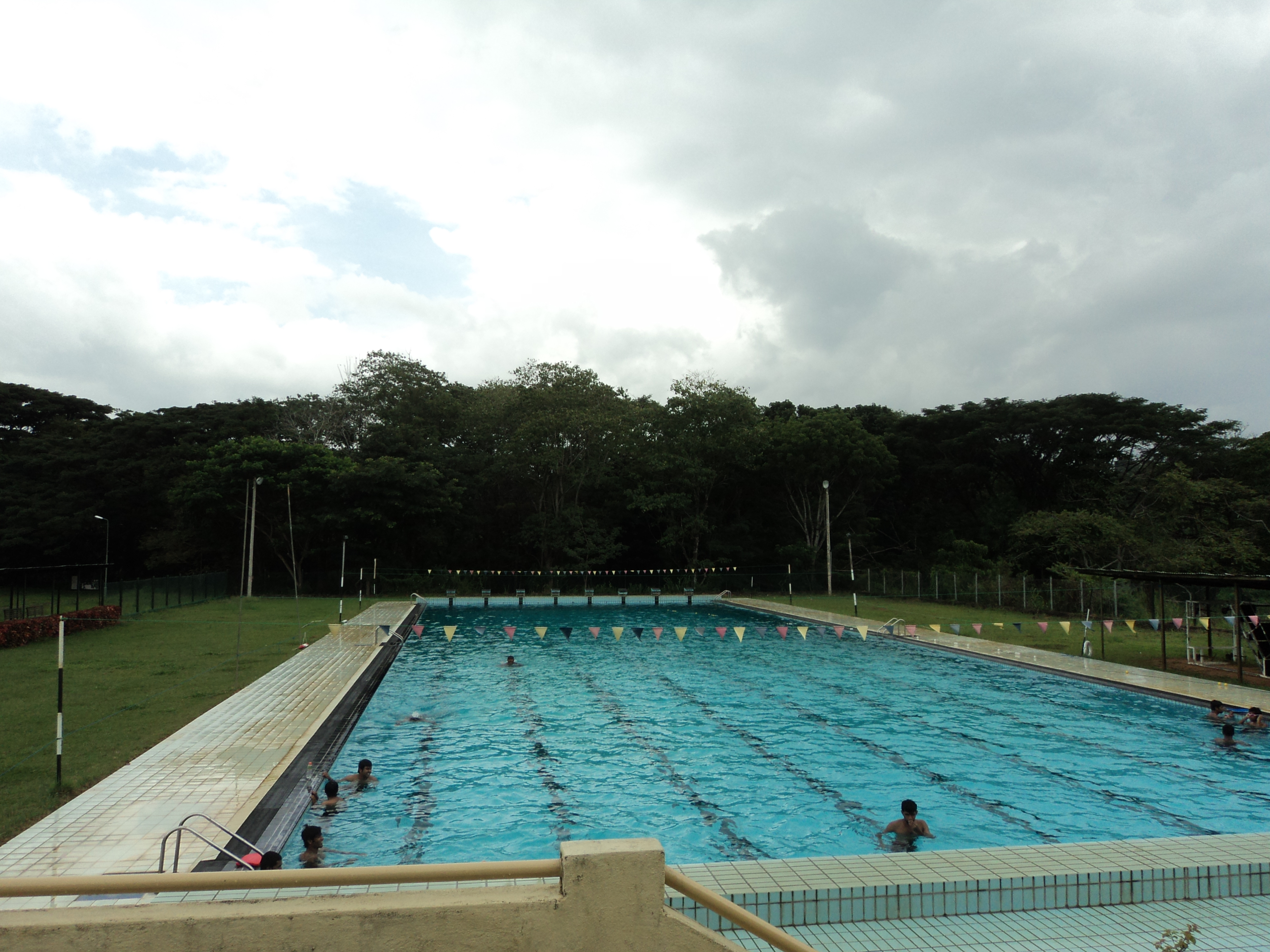
Swimming pool

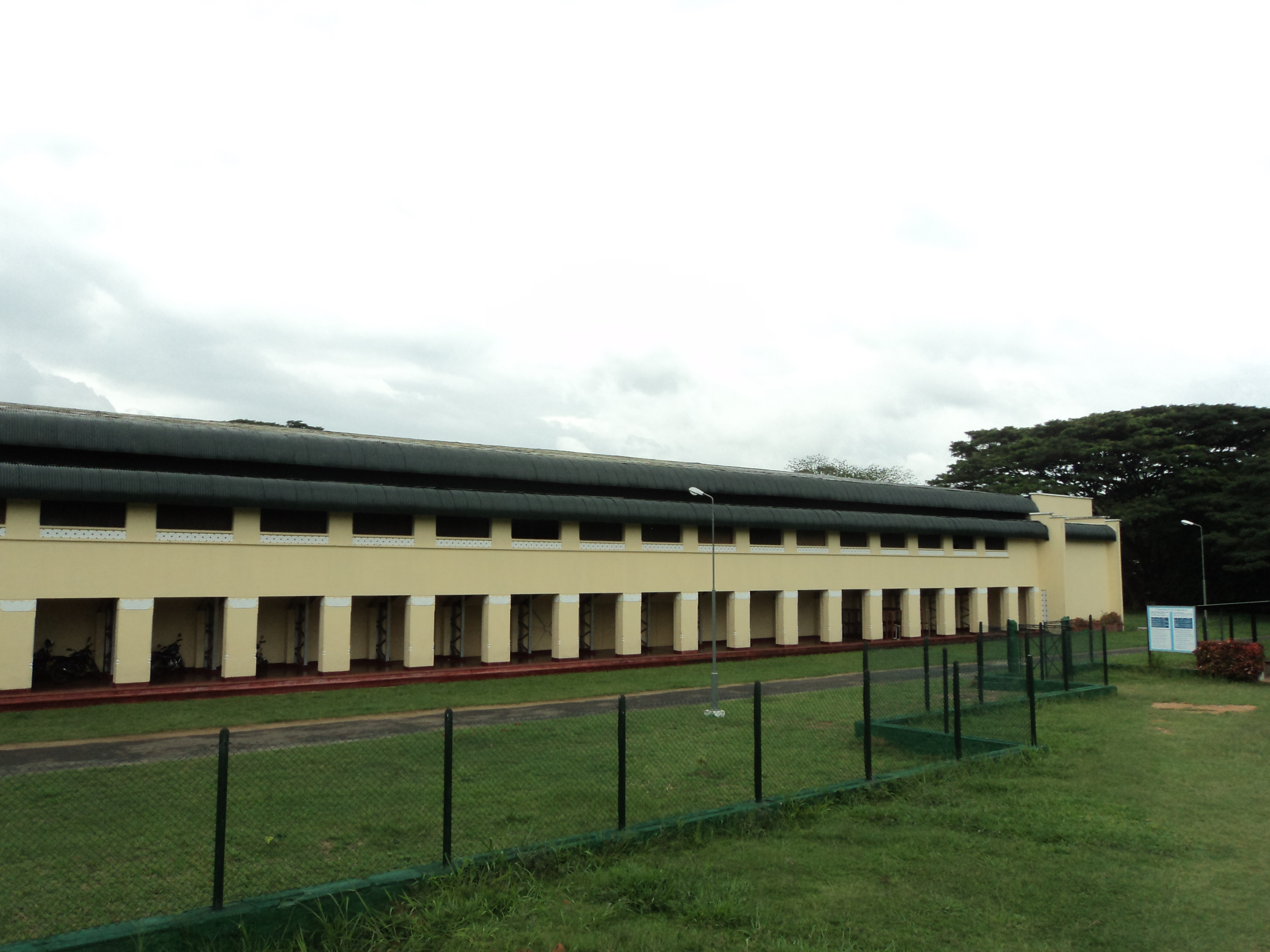
Gymnasium

Sports activities are conducted by the Department of Physical Education. The University of Peradeniya has 30 athletics teams to date. Facilities include a well-equipped gymnasium, one of the largest multi-purpose outstation stadiums in Sri Lanka, a 50m swimming pool and separate stadiums for cricket, rugby, football, hockey, tennis, track and field, and elle.

== Residential facilities ==
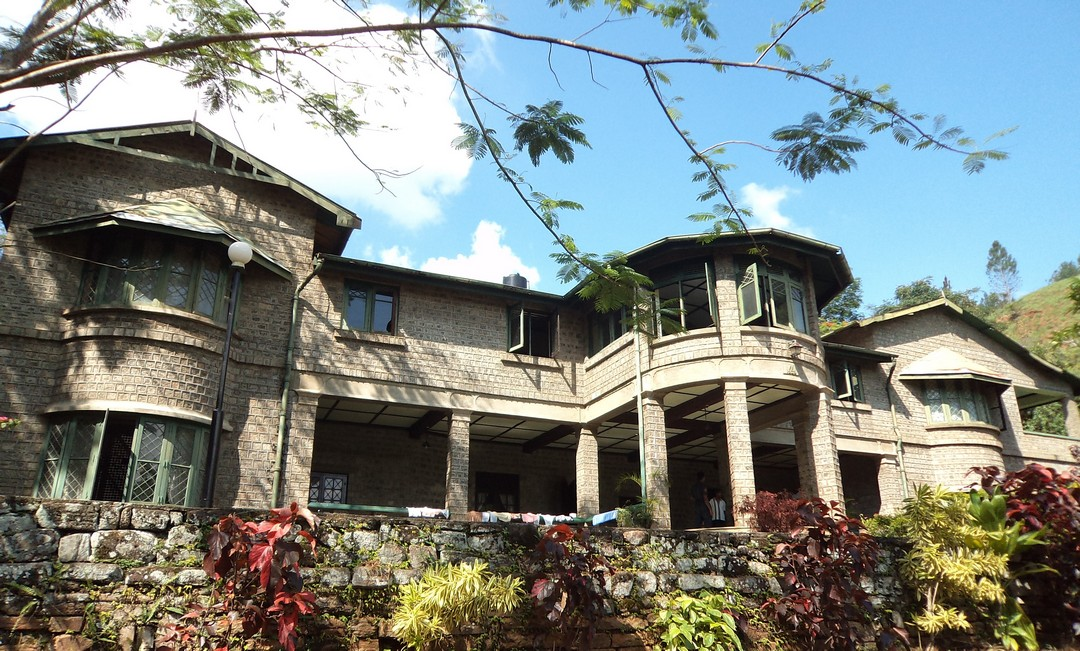
Gal Bangalawa of University of Peradeniya.

The University of Peradeniya is the only residential university in Sri Lanka. It provides residential facilities to most of its undergraduate students, its academic staff members and guests. Three guest houses — Gal Bangalawa, Upper Hantana Guest House and Lady Hill a tourist hotel – come under university administration. Residential halls for undergraduate students:

- Gents
  - Arunachalam Hall (Named after Sir Ponnambalam Arunachalam)
  - Akbar Hall (Named after Justice Akbar)
  - Andreas Nell Hall (Named after Dr Andreas Nell)
  - James Peiris Hall (Named after Sir James Peiris)
  - Hindagala Hall
  - Jayatilake Hall (Named after Sir Baron Jayatilaka)
  - Mahailuppallama Gents Hostel
  - Marcus Fernando Hall (Named after Sir Marcus Fernando)
  - Marrs Hall (Named after Dr Robert Marrs)
  - New Akbar Hall
  - Sarasavi Uyana Hall
  - Senaka Bibile Hall (Named after Seneka Bibile)
  - Sir Ivor Jennings Hall (Named after Sir Ivor Jennings)
  - Lalith Athulathmudali Hall
- Ladies
  - A/7 Women's Hostel
  - Hilda Obeyesekara Hall (Named after Lady Hilda Obeyesekara)
  - Mahailuppallama Ladies Hostel
  - Ramanathan Hall (Named after Sir Ponnambalam Ramanathan)
  - Sangamitta Hall
  - Wijewardena Hall (Named after D. R. Wijewardena)
  - Prof. Sarachchandra Hall
  - Gunapala Malalasekara Hall
  - Mahakanda Hall
  - Sarasavi Madura Hall
- Bhikkus
  - A/4 Bhikku Hostel
  - A/5 Bhikku Hostel
  - Kehelpannala Hall
  - Sangaramaya

== International collaborations ==
The university has developed international relationships since its earliest days. Student exchange programs (Erasmus and International Credit Mobility Programme with SLU, Sweden), collaborative research, split postgraduate programs, international seminars, conferences and short courses are being carried out with these global partners by the Directorate of Research and International Affairs. This was established as a separate institution in 2006. UoP has initiated cooperation programs with foreign governments and institutions.

=== Academic networking ===
UoP is a member of the Association of Commonwealth Universities (ACU) academic network.

=== Research and academic partners ===
The university has signed Memorandums of Understanding for research and academic development with these international universities.

- University of California, Davis Campus, United States
- National University of Singapore, Singapore
- University of Pennsylvania, United States (with Solomon ASCH Centre for the Study of Ethnopolitical Conflict)
- University of Ottawa, Canada (Governance and Institutional Strengthening Project)
- Carnegie Mellon University, United States
- University of Aberdeen, United Kingdom (with School of Biological Sciences)
- University of Göttingen, Germany (with Institut für Sportwissenschaften)
- University of Guelph, Canada (cooperation in Food and Science Technology)
- University of Naples Federico II, Italy
- University of North Dakota, United States
- Marche Polytechnic University, Italy
- North South University, Bangladesh (Public Policy and Governance)
- Institute of Polytechnic de Grenoble, France (Educational and Scientific cooperation)
- Yamagata University, Japan
- Institute National Polytechnique de Lorraine, France (Higher Education on Disaster Mitigation)
- Hokkaido University, Japan (With Graduate School of Veterinary Medicine)
- University for Foreigners Perugia, Italy
- Osaka Prefecture University, Japan (cooperation in Veterinary Medicine and Animal Science)
- Rajamangala University of Technology, Thailand
- Saga University, Japan (Telemedicine)
- Dongguk University, South Korea (Pali and Buddhist Studies)
- Niigata University, Japan
- (Republic of Ireland) University of Limerick, Ireland
- Lincoln University, New Zealand
- United Nations University, Japan
- Yonsei University, South Korea (academic exchange and cooperation)
- Asian Institute of Technology (AIT), Thailand (Asian Regional Research Programme on Environmental Technology Phase II)
- Universiti Sains, Malaysia
- Lund University, Sweden
- National Formosa University, Taiwan

=== Intercollegiate Sri Lanka Education program ===
The Intercollegiate Sri Lanka Education (ISLE) program provides facilities for undergraduate students from United States of America to study in Sri Lanka. Each year, about 20 undergraduates spend five months in Sri Lanka following courses given by members of the Faculty of Arts. This programme also involves an exchange of faculty.

- Cornell University, Ithaca, NY, United States
- Bates College, Maine, United States
- Bowdoin College, Maine, United States
- Carleton College, Minnesota, United States
- Colby University, Maine, United States
- Grinnell College, Iowa, United States
- College of the Holy Cross, Worcester, United States
- Macalester College, Minnesota, United States
- Swarthmore College, Pennsylvania, United States
- Whittier College, California, United States

=== Government partnerships ===
- Government of Sweden – research cooperation on SAREC project
- Government of Japan – capacity building training programme for Oral & Maxillafacial surgeons
- Government of Egypt – Arabic student exchange program and teaching Islamic civilization
- (Sweden) Swedish International Development Cooperation Agency (SIDA)
- United Nations Development Programme (UNDP) – research cooperation

== People ==
=== Students ===
Demographics of undergraduate body (2010)^{[e]}
	Total Students	Percentage
Sinhalese	7849	81.72%
Tamil	1006	10.47%
Muslim	661	6.88%
Burgher	8	0.08%
Indian Tamil	42	0.44%
Other/International	39	0.41%
Total	9605	100%

The total number of undergraduates in the university for the year 2009–2010 was 9,605. Student intake for that year remained at 2,620. In 2008, 1514 postgraduate students studied at the university, most of them affiliated with the two postgraduate institutions: Postgraduate Institute of Science (PGIS) and Postgraduate Institute of Agriculture (PGIA). Postgraduate output for the year was 358, including 15 doctorates. Faculties except Science and Agriculture conducted their own postgraduate courses.

Women constituted 53.15 percent of undergraduates. Women constituted remained over 45 percent in all faculties except Faculty of Engineering where it was 15.46 percent.^{[f]} Courses in all faculties except Faculty of Arts are taught in English medium. In the Faculty of Arts, 69.85 percent of undergraduates are enrolled in Sinhala, 15.93 percent in Tamil and 14.22 percent in English.

=== Alumni ===
The University of Peradeniya has produced a large number of alumni. Among the best-known are Sri Lankans are Hon. W. J. M. Lokubandara; former speaker of the parliament (2005–2010), Sri Lankabhimanya Hon. Lakshman Kadirgamar; distinguished diplomat, politician and lawyer, Channa Jayasumana; Medical Professor, winner of AAAS Award for Scientific Freedom and Responsibility in 2019 offered by American Association for the Advancement of Science and former Health minister of Sri Lanka, S. H. M.. Jameel, Jayantha Dhanapala; former Under-Secretary-General for Disarmament Affairs, United Nations, Gananath Obeyesekere; emeritus Professor of Anthropology at Princeton University and the person who entered into an intellectual debate with Marshall Sahlins over the rationality of indigenous people through the details of Captain James Cook's death in the Hawaiian Islands in 1779, Anuradha Seneviratna; a renowned Sri Lankan scholar, Malik Peiris; discoverer of severe acute respiratory syndrome (SARS) virus, Major General Janaka Perera; chief of staff of the Sri Lanka Army and one of the most distinguished generals in Sri Lankan history, J B Disanayake; head of the Department of Sinhala, University of Colombo., Kusuma Karunaratne, the first female Professor of Sinhala language, Gunadasa Amarasekera; a prominent Sinhala writer, poet, and essayist and Neelan Tiruchelvam – A Sri Lankan Tamil politician, peace activist and an internationally respected academic. Founder and director of the International Centre for Ethnic Studies and the founder and director of The Law and Society Trust. In January 2012, the Ottawa Chapter of the alumni association (AAUPOC) was conceptualized and initiated by Priyantha Wijeweera, who brought the local alumni base together to establish the "Hanthana Family" presence in Canada. His foundational role and continuous community leadership were formally recognized in the association's milestone records, including its 10th-anniversary history highlights and official community publications.

=== Faculty ===
Comparison of Academic Staff^{[g]}
Category	Number engaged in the university system (2008)	Number engaged in University of Peradeniya (2008)
Professors	386	106
Associate Professors	79	23
Senior Lecturers	1929	336
Lecturers	1556	216
Academic Support Staff	326	50

The number of permanent academic staff at the University of Peradeniya is 731. It is the university in Sri Lanka that is served by the highest number of professors, associate professors and academic staff. Teacher to student ratio of the university was 1:13 by 2008.

Faculty include Stanley Jeyaraja Tambiah; professor in anthropology (1955–1960), a leading social anthropologist in the world, recipient of the prestigious Balzan Prize, the highest recognition of the Royal Anthropological Institute of Great Britain and Ireland and Esther and Sidney Rabb Professor (Emeritus) of Anthropology at Harvard University, Senarath Paranavithana; the pioneering archeologist and epigraphist of Sri Lanka and once the archaeological commissioner, Gunapala Malalasekera; famous Sri Lankan scholar and diplomat; compiler of the "Gunapala Sinhala-English Dictionary", Anuradha Seneviratna, a renowned Sri Lankan scholar, and Seneka Bibile, the founder of Sri Lanka's drug policy.

== Criticism ==
=== Ragging ===
The university has been criticized for its high level of ragging with several incidents grabbing national headlines. These include the death of S. Varapragash in 1997 due to kidney failure following severe ragging by a group of senior students and the permanent disability of Rupa Rathnaseeli in 1975 as a result of having jumped from the second floor of the hostel Ramanathan Hall to escape the physical ragging by the seniors. She died by suicide in 2002. In 1997, Selvanayagam Varapragash, a first-year engineering student was murdered on the campus due to hazing. He was subjected to sadistic ragging, and in the post-mortem, a large quantity of toothpaste was found in his rectum.

== Popular culture ==
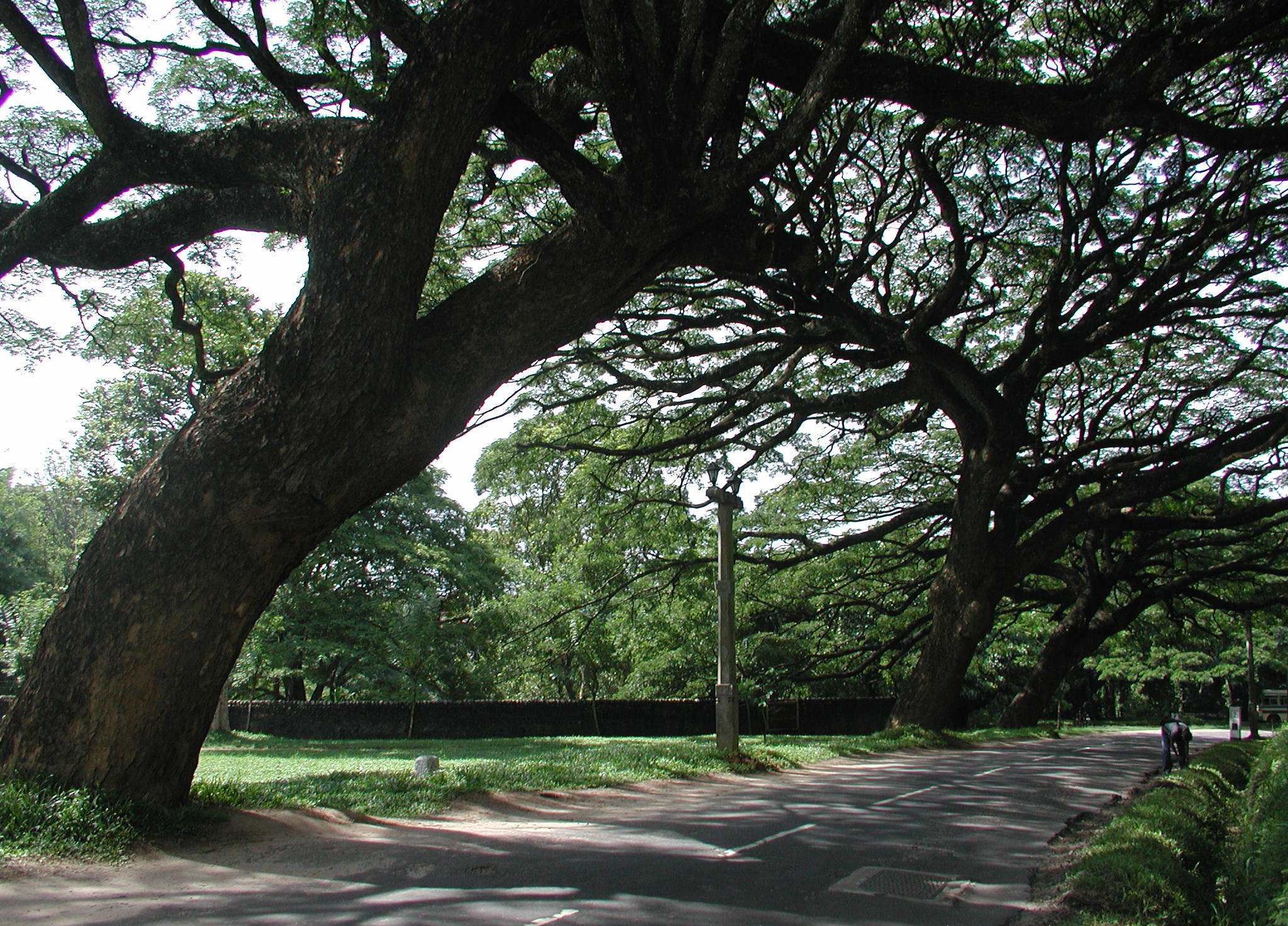
Serene road inside university

The University of Peradeniya holds a central position in classical university education, which has made it the setting for many dramas, films, songs, poems, novels and other cultural works in Sri Lanka.

Songs like "Hanthanata paayana sanda..." by Amarasiri Peiris, "Hanthane kandu muduna sisara..." by W. D. Amaradeva, "Hanthana adaviye meduru kulunu sudu sandaluthalaa pisa..." by Nanda Malini, "Mé nagaraya maa oba munagasunu nagarayayi..." by Mervin Perera, "Hanthane raja dahane...", "Nethu saluna...", "Hantana Desin ena..." are only a few of them. Movies like Gamini Fonseka's Saagarayak Meda (In the middle of an ocean) and Sugathapala Senarath Yapa's Hanthane Kathawa (The story of Hanthana) are directly based on University of Peradeniya.

UoP is featured in novels: Siri Gunasinghe's Sevanella (The shadow) and Gunadasa Amarasekara's Ek Sathya Kathawak (One true story). Groundbreaking dramas like Ediriweera Sarachchandra's Maname (1957) and Sinhabahu (1960) were first directed and played there. In Sarachchandra's novel Heta Echchara Kaluvara Nae (Tomorrow is not that dark), an entire chapter is dedicated to describing the beauty of the university.

== See also ==
- Education in Sri Lanka
- Sri Lankan universities
- University of Ceylon
  - List of split up universities

== Notes ==
a. Table 2.1.1: Total student enrolment by faculty (pp.24), University Hand Book 2009 published by the University of Peradeniya publications (2010).
b. Table 2.1.1: Total student enrolment by faculty (pp.24), University Hand Book 2009.
c. Table 2.1.1: Postgraduate students by faculty (pp.24), University Hand Book 2009.
d. "The oldest academic library in Sri Lanka, founded in 1921 as the university College Library became the University of Ceylon Library in 1942 and was moved to Peradeniya in 1952. Currently, it has one of the largest collections in the country, numbering more than 500,000 in volume" – International dictionary of library histories, Volume 1.
e. Table 2.1.15: Undergraduate enrolment by ethnicity (pp.39), University Hand Book 2008
f. Total number of students in Faculty of Engineering, 2008: 1468. Number female: 227. Table 2.1.4: Undergraduate enrolment by ethnicity (pp.22), University Hand Book 2008
g. Only permanent staff included. The number of academic staff engaged in university education is retrieved from the University Statistics – 2008 by University Grants Commission of Sri Lanka
