= Peradeniya =

Peradeniya පේරාදෙණිය பேராதனை
- suburb
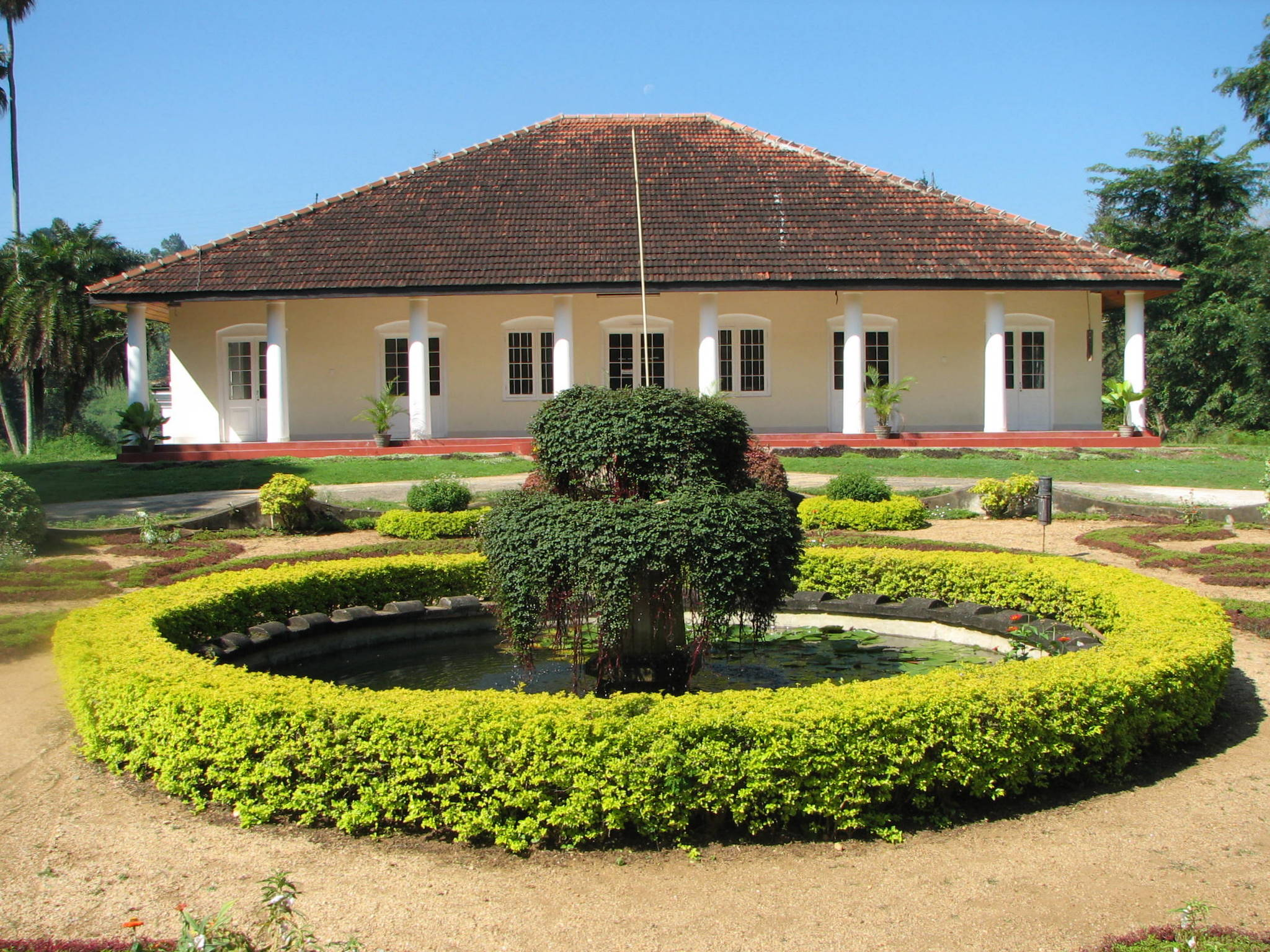
- Botanic Gardens of Peradeniya

- Location in Sri Lanka
- Coordinates: 7°16′N 80°36′E
- Country: Sri Lanka
- Province: Central Province
- District: Kandy District

Population
  - Total: 30,000
- Time zone: +5.30
- Post Code: 20400

Peradeniya (Sinhala: පේරාදෙණිය, romanized: Pēradeniya; Tamil: பேராதனை, romanized: Pērātaṉai) is a suburb of the city of Kandy, Sri Lanka with about 30,000 inhabitants. It is situated on the A1 main road, a few kilometres west of Kandy city centre. Peradeniya's name is derived from pera (guava) and deniya (a plain).

Peradeniya is famous for the Royal Botanic Gardens of Peradeniya. It is situated in a slope of the Mahaweli River and attracts many visitors from Sri Lanka as well as from abroad.

Another key attribute of this suburb is the University of Peradeniya. Its buildings are of mixed colonial and traditional Sri Lankan/South East Asian styles, and located amongst the lush vegetation of the hill country. The Department of Agriculture and the Sri Lanka Telecom Training Centre is situated here.

West of the suburb lies the small historical town of Kadugannawa.
