= Sri Lankan sporting disappearances =

Phenomenon in international sports

Sri Lanka highlighted on a globe

Since at least 1993, numerous athletes and sport managers from the island nation of Sri Lanka, often acting as national delegates, have disappeared during international sporting competitions held overseas. Hundreds have gone missing in at least 47 of these incidents, or 'decampings'.

In most of these cases, investigators theorized the missing persons had attempted to illegally immigrate to the countries they decamped in. Sri Lankan sporting officials now take precautions to deter decampings, sometimes to no avail. Sporting delegates from other countries have disappeared in a similar manner, but the phenomenon is uniquely common amongst Sri Lankans.

The most infamous case was in 2004, when all 23 men constituting a self-described Sri Lankan "national handball team" disappeared during a tournament in Bavaria, Germany. The tournament organizers then discovered that, in actuality, Sri Lanka did not have an official "national handball team", and that the men had tricked the German embassy in Sri Lanka into issuing them German travel visas, possibly by submitting forged documents as proof they were an official team. Consequently, Germany stopped issuing travel visas to all Sri Lankan athletes.

== History ==
The frequency at which Sri Lankan sports delegates disappear overseas had been noticed by 2007 at the latest, when an official of the Sri Lanka Amateur Athletics Association, Prema Pinnawela, stated that "about 25 to 30 Sri Lankan athletes" had disappeared overseas since 1992. There had actually been more (at least, 11 disappeared in 1993, and 22 in 2004). Sri Lankan sporting officials have referred to the incidents as 'decampings'. Vice News' Kris Thomas reported in 2021 that "hundreds" of people had gone missing across at least 44 decampings. Since then, 13 people have disappeared across at least three more.

By 2021, Sri Lankan sports governing bodies had started taking precautions to deter decampings; all of the country's athletes became required to sign off on a bond of one million Sri Lankan rupees before competing overseas, and pay it off upon their return. Some delegates have to give their passports and other important documents to team officials for the duration of their visits. Despite these changes, some athletes have still disappeared.

=== Immigration theory ===
The most common explanation given for this phenomenon by investigators and sports officials is that the missing persons, in general, have used sporting events to legally enter foreign countries, so they can illegally immigrate to those countries by staying. The persons' alleged motivations have been to escape war or economic hardship in Sri Lanka, which is an island nation.

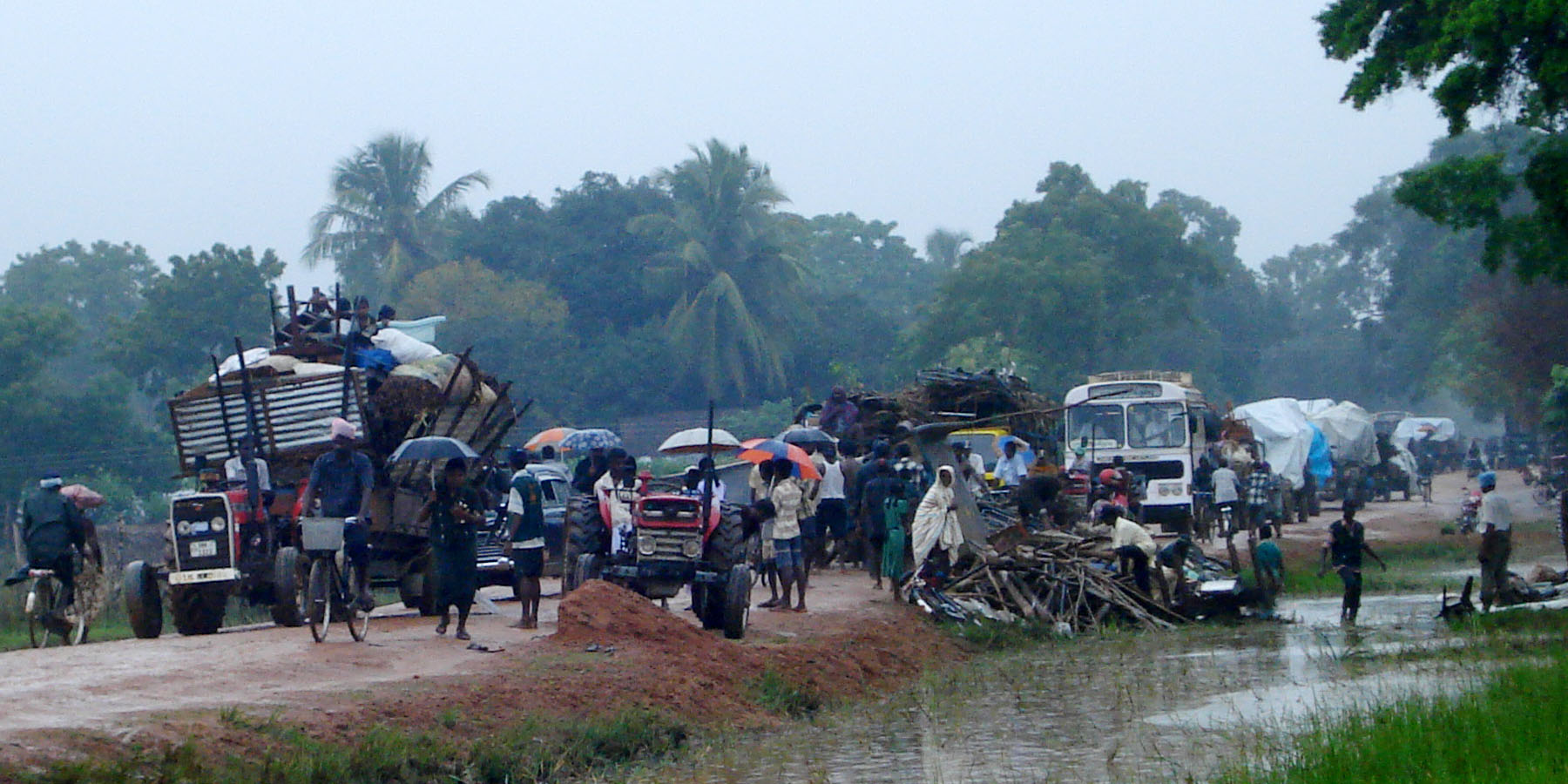
Sri Lankan civilians in 2009, fleeing their homes in the northern Vanni region as a result of fighting during the Sri Lankan civil war

The Tamils are a minority ethnic group in Sri Lanka. In northern Sri Lanka from 1983 to 2009, there was a civil war between the country's government and the Tamil nationalist militant group Liberation Tigers of Tamil Eelam, or 'Tamil Tigers'. The government won. The total deaths from the conflict have been estimated at 80,000 to 100,000. In addition to the conflict with the Tamil Tigers, many Tamils and organizations such as the Canadian government have stated the Sri Lankan government waged a genocide against Tamils during the war, which the government denies.

In the early 2020s, the country had its worst economic crisis since it declared independence in 1948. A foreign exchange shortage had led the government to limit imports of food, fuel, and medicine, causing these items to be rationed, and forcing school closures. This created nationwide protests which the government violently countered, and president Gotabaya Rajapaksa was ousted in 2022. The crisis continued under his successor Ranil Wickremesighe. The economy partially recovered in 2024.

=== Incidents involving other nationalities ===
Decampings are a uniquely common problem among Sri Lankan delegates, but it is not exclusive to them. Since 2000, delegates of other nations in Africa and Asia have disappeared from at least eight international events. As with the Sri Lankan decampings, investigators believe emigration is a possible explanation for most of these cases. The phenomenon dates back to at least the Cold War, when some athletes known as "Olympic defectors" disappeared during overseas Olympic games to easily leave their capitalist or communist home nations for the opposite system of government, as legal travel between those 'worlds' was difficult.

== 1993, athletes in Canada ==
During an unspecified sporting event in Canada in 1993, ten out of eleven members of a Sri Lankan national team disappeared. They were never found, and the remaining man traveled back to Sri Lanka.

== 2004, handball team in Germany ==
=== Disappearance ===
The most infamous decamping was in Germany in 2004. 23 men presenting themselves as Sri Lanka's "national handball team"—eight as trainers, one as a coach, and one as a manager—arrived in Bavaria on 8 September. Invited by sports club TSV Wittislingen, they were scheduled to play in a ten-game local handball tournament organized by the Asian-German Sports Exchange Program (AGSEP). Sri Lankan teams had competed through the program without any problems for 15 years, so the German organizers of the tournament believed the men were genuinely Sri Lanka's national team. All 23 had valid travel visas to be in Germany for a month. Staying together in a hotel in Wittislingen, they played a number of games and lost all of them. Their opponents said the team seemed to know "virtually nothing" about the rules of handball.

As of 13 September, the team was still scheduled to play in seven more games, but that morning, none of them showed up at their scheduled breakfast with the Germans. The German athletes and organizers assumed they had gotten lost on a jog in the nearby woods, but upon investigating the team's room, they only found loose items of clothing, some sports kits, and a note written in English, apparently by one of the members, saying the team were headed to France.

=== Aftermath ===
Sri Lankan sporting officials said their country did not have an official national handball team, let alone a single handball club. They noted that the sport is "very rarely played" in the country. An AGSEP official said he was disappointed by the incident, and that the organization would not allow athletes from Sri Lanka to compete in any of their future handball tournaments.

Germany stopped issuing travel visas to Sri Lankan athletes of any sport, due to the team having tricked the German embassy in Colombo, Sri Lanka, into believing the men were a professional team who wanted to tour for a month. All who applied as part of the team were issued visas. Heidi Jung, German ambassador to Sri Lanka, said: "They presented documents, and the documents looked all right, so there were no reasons to say we can't give you a visa". German immigration officials agreed with this explanation, saying the papers looked "quite genuine". In contrast, French investigators were reported as being "flustered" with Sri Lankan authorities for allowing the team to fly "without having apparently provided proper papers".

==== Investigation ====
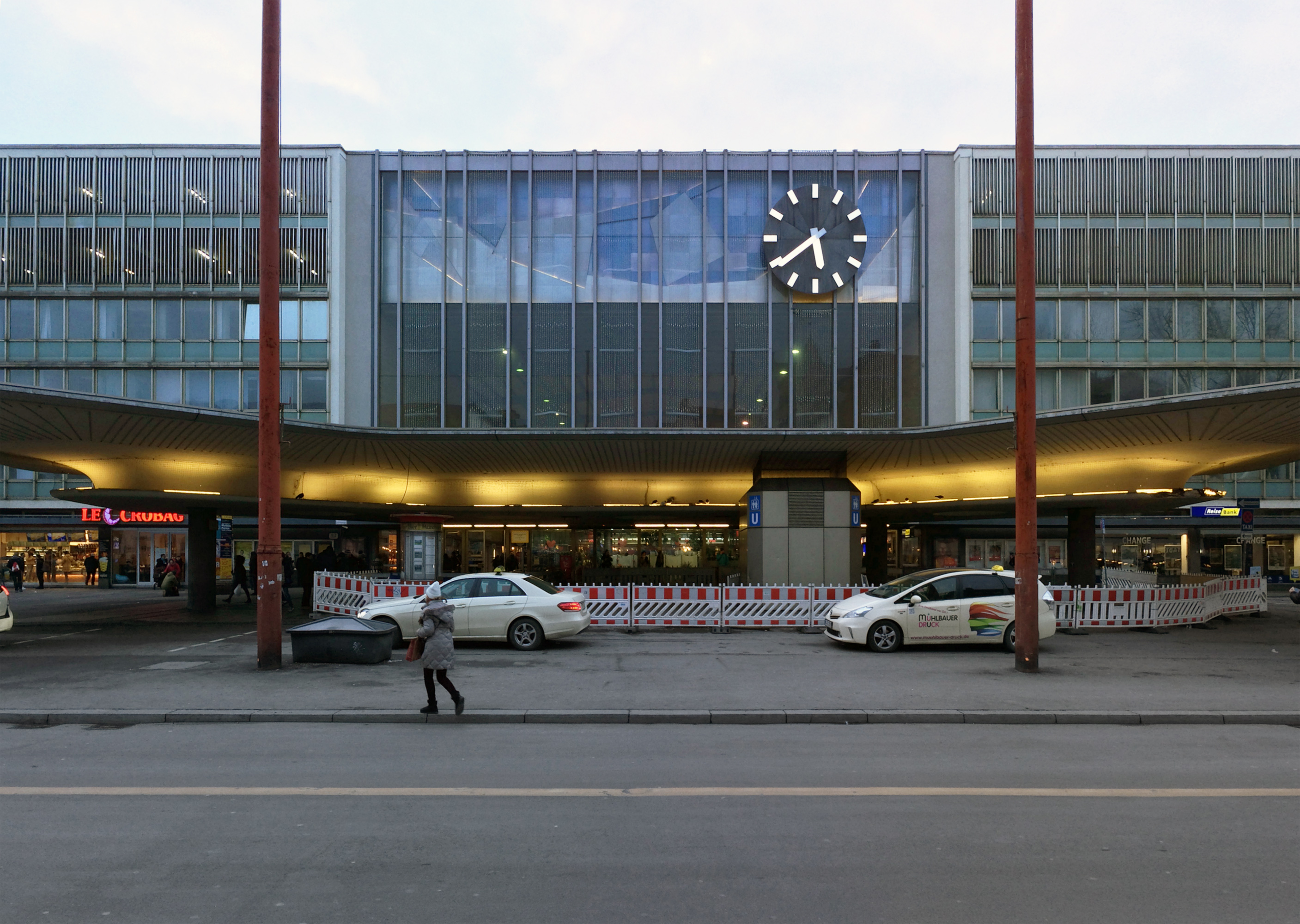
The München Hauptbahnhof railway station in Munich, where the Sri Lankan handball team were dropped off and last witnessed

German and French investigators worked on the case, the former lodging an enquiry with the Sri Lankan embassy in Berlin. Germany's border patrol officers were notified about the incident. A taxi driver in Wittislingen told police that he and a few other local taxis were paid to bring the Sri Lankans to the central railway station in Munich. In Sri Lanka, police interrogated the families of the players.

Investigators theorized that the team illegally immigrated to Italy, where a notable Sri Lankan immigrant community had developed in the years prior. This was based on event organizers learning that one of the players contacted his mother in Sri Lanka, telling her he was currently located in Italy and would soon acquire a job. The theory was ultimately true. More than half of the players returned to Sri Lanka within a decade, and some spoke on going to Italy.

==== Media depictions ====
American conservative TV channel Fox News falsely reported on the story by suggesting, MEL Magazine's Andre Fiouzi writes, that "a handball team full of Tamil terrorists had been smuggled into Germany"—linking the team with the Tamil Tigers. According to AGSEP founder Dietmar Doering, only three people on the team were actually Tamil.

The disappearances were depicted in the 2008 dramedy film Machan, directed by Uberto Pasolini. The film was critically acclaimed, and a blockbuster success in Sri Lanka. During its production, the filmmakers interviewed many people in the country who could speak on the disappearances. Those people recalled that the men on the handball team had been poor in Sri Lanka, living in slums, and that going missing in such a manner was their solution to emigration after failing multiple times through legal avenues.

== 2007, athletes in Italy ==
In June 2007, during an international sports training event organized by the International Olympic Committee in Italy, six Sri Lankan delegates disappeared from their hotel, including a triple jump coach named Gayan Malika. They were never found.

== 2014, athletes in South Korea ==
During the 2014 Asian Games in South Korea, two members of the Sri Lankan contingent, a field hockey player and a beach volleyball player, disappeared and were never found. Investigators theorized the two were attempting to illegally live in the country. They were subsequently blacklisted from participating in multiple international sporting events.

== 2021, wrestling manager in Norway ==
In September 2021, Donald Indrawansa, a 45-year-old Sri Lankan wrestler and wrestling manager, arrived in Oslo as the manager of the Sri Lankan delegation in the 2021 World Wrestling Championships. On 4 October, the day before he was scheduled to go back home with his team, Indrawansa suddenly disappeared without any witnesses or traces of him leaving. The rest of his team ultimately returned to their country. The Wrestling Federation of Sri Lanka announced it would investigate the incident, but the organization's president said Indrawansa had likely used the trip to illegally immigrate to Europe, condemning him for lacking sportsmanship.

== 2022, team delegates in the United Kingdom ==
=== Disappearances ===
In August 2022, 11 of the 160 to 177 members of the Sri Lankan contingent at the 2022 Commonwealth Games in Birmingham, England disappeared, most of them last witnessed at the Games' athletes' village. Each member of the contingent had entered the U.K. on valid six-month visas. On August 4, male wrestler Yoda Pedige Shanith Chathuranga, female judoka Chamila Dilani Marappulige, and her female manager Tikiri Hannadige Duminda Asela De Silva disappeared without warning. Chathuranga was last seen at a Birmingham medical centre, leaving after receiving a positive test result for COVID-19, while the other two were last seen at the athlete's village. Marappulige went missing soon after losing her first match.

The delegation's officials notified authorities, starting an investigation by West Midlands Police and the National Olympic Committee. Authorities made sure the three would be unable to cross British borders. In an attempt to deter future disappearances, the officials made every delegate hand them their passports. Nonetheless, seven more people disappeared from the village by 7 August; they went unidentified by the press, except for boxer Vittalis Niklas. In 2025, an unnamed photographer with the contingent was reported to have also gone missing at some point during the Games. Notably, five of the missing persons had served in the Sri Lanka Armed Forces.

=== Investigation ===
Multiple writers reported on the incident in the context of Sri Lanka's concurrent economic crisis. Sri Lanka Cricket volunteered to finance 20 million Sri Lankan rupees for the delegates' expenses, as the team could not pay it on their own. The National Olympic Committee of Sri Lanka also announced they would have two employees monitoring the Games' athlete's village for looting or disappearances. Investigators suspected the missing persons had used the Games to illegally immigrate to the U.K.

Police eventually located Chathuranga, Marappulige, and de Silva; authorities did not charge them with any crimes, saying the three had valid visas and had followed local laws. Two of them spoke to the police, but were not identified by the press. At the request of the police, the delegation's officials eventually handed the delegates back their passports. In November 2022, West Midlands Police ended their investigation into Sri Lanka's disappearances, as well as delegates from other countries who also went missing during the Games, stating: "Those reported missing were either found, or the investigation closed because they were no longer believed to be missing." An update on any of the delegates' whereabouts was not given. In 2025, the Sri Lankan government began legal proceedings against the country's eleven missing delegates—including Chathuranga, Marappulige, and de Silva—and issued warrants for their arrest through Interpol.

== 2023, track and field athlete in Switzerland ==
In June 2023, Greshan Dhananjaya, a Sri Lankan record-holding athlete in triple jump and a national champion in long jump visited Geneva, Switzerland to represent Sri Lanka in an international athletics event. He was accompanied at the start of the trip by women's long jump champion Sarangi Silva and coach Y. K. Kularathna. After participating in a long jump event, he disappeared and was never found. Saman Kumara Gunawardena, secretary of Sri Lanka Athletics, which represents national Sri Lankan sports delegations, said that the organization was not responsible to investigate the disappearance, as Dhananjaya was invited privately and not in association with a Sri Lanka Athletics delegation.

== 2023, archers in South Korea ==
In August 2023, the annual World Archery Asia Challenge and its related athletic training program were held at the Wouju Koranju Archery Centre in South Korea. Five Sri Lankan athletes and their coach, representing the Sri Lanka Archery Association, arrived in the country, at which point two of them, archers, immediately disappeared without informing the others. They have not been found.

== List of reported incidents ==
The following is an incomplete list of decampings based on the above sections:

Date	Missing persons		Location	Event	Found status
1993	10	Athletes in unspecified sport	Canada	N/A	Not found
13 September 2004	23	21 amateur handball players	Wittislingen and Munich, Germany	Handball tournament ran by the Asian-German Sports Exchange Program	More than half of the team returned to Sri Lanka within a decade; these members said that most of the team had planned to go to Italy
13 September 2004	23	A self-described coach	Wittislingen and Munich, Germany	Handball tournament ran by the Asian-German Sports Exchange Program	More than half of the team returned to Sri Lanka within a decade; these members said that most of the team had planned to go to Italy
13 September 2004	23	A self-described manager	Wittislingen and Munich, Germany	Handball tournament ran by the Asian-German Sports Exchange Program	More than half of the team returned to Sri Lanka within a decade; these members said that most of the team had planned to go to Italy
June 2007	6	Triple jump coach Gayan Malika	Italy	Training event held by the International Olympic Committee	Not found
June 2007	6	5 others in unspecified roles	Italy	Training event held by the International Olympic Committee	Not found
2014	2	A field hockey player	Incheon, South Korea	2014 Asian Games	Not found
2014	2	A beach volleyball player	Incheon, South Korea	2014 Asian Games	Not found
4 October 2021	1	Wrestling manager Donald Indrawansa	Oslo, Norway	2021 World Wrestling Championships	Not found
4 August 2022	3	Wrestler Yoda Pedige Shanith Chathuranga	Birmingham, United Kingdom	2022 Commonwealth Games	Police gave vague statements upon ending the missing persons investigations; they concluded that the delegates "were either found, or [are] no longer believed to be missing"
4 August 2022	3	Judoka Chamila Dilani Marappulige	Birmingham, United Kingdom	2022 Commonwealth Games	Police gave vague statements upon ending the missing persons investigations; they concluded that the delegates "were either found, or [are] no longer believed to be missing"
4 August 2022	3	Marappulige's manager, Tikiri Hannadige Duminda Asela De Silva	Birmingham, United Kingdom	2022 Commonwealth Games	Police gave vague statements upon ending the missing persons investigations; they concluded that the delegates "were either found, or [are] no longer believed to be missing"
5–7 August 2022	8	Boxer Vittalis Niklas	Birmingham, United Kingdom	2022 Commonwealth Games	Police gave vague statements upon ending the missing persons investigations; they concluded that the delegates "were either found, or [are] no longer believed to be missing"
5–7 August 2022	8	A photographer	Birmingham, United Kingdom	2022 Commonwealth Games	Police gave vague statements upon ending the missing persons investigations; they concluded that the delegates "were either found, or [are] no longer believed to be missing"
5–7 August 2022	8	Six others in unspecified roles	Birmingham, United Kingdom	2022 Commonwealth Games	Police gave vague statements upon ending the missing persons investigations; they concluded that the delegates "were either found, or [are] no longer believed to be missing"
June 2023	1	Greshan Dhananjaya, long jump athlete	Geneva, Switzerland	N/A	Not found
August 2023	2	Archers	South Korea	2023 World Archery Asia Challenge	Not found

== See also ==
- Julie Betu, a Congolese handball player who disappeared during a 2014 championship in Croatia
- Visa requirements for Sri Lankan citizens
- List of people who disappeared
- Enforced disappearances in Sri Lanka
- Foreign relations of Sri Lanka
