= Visa policy of Sri Lanka =

Policy on permits required to enter Sri Lanka

Most visitors to Sri Lanka must obtain an Electronic Travel Authorization (ETA).

All visitors must hold a passport valid for at least 6 months.

== Visa policy map ==
Visa policy of Sri Lanka Sri Lanka Free Electronic Travel Authorization - ETA (90 days) Free Electronic Travel Authorization - ETA (30 days) Electronic Travel Authorization - ETA (30 days) Electronic Travel Authorization - ETA (30 days) only through a local sponsor

== Electronic Travel Authorization (ETA) ==
Sri Lanka Electronic Travel Authorization System

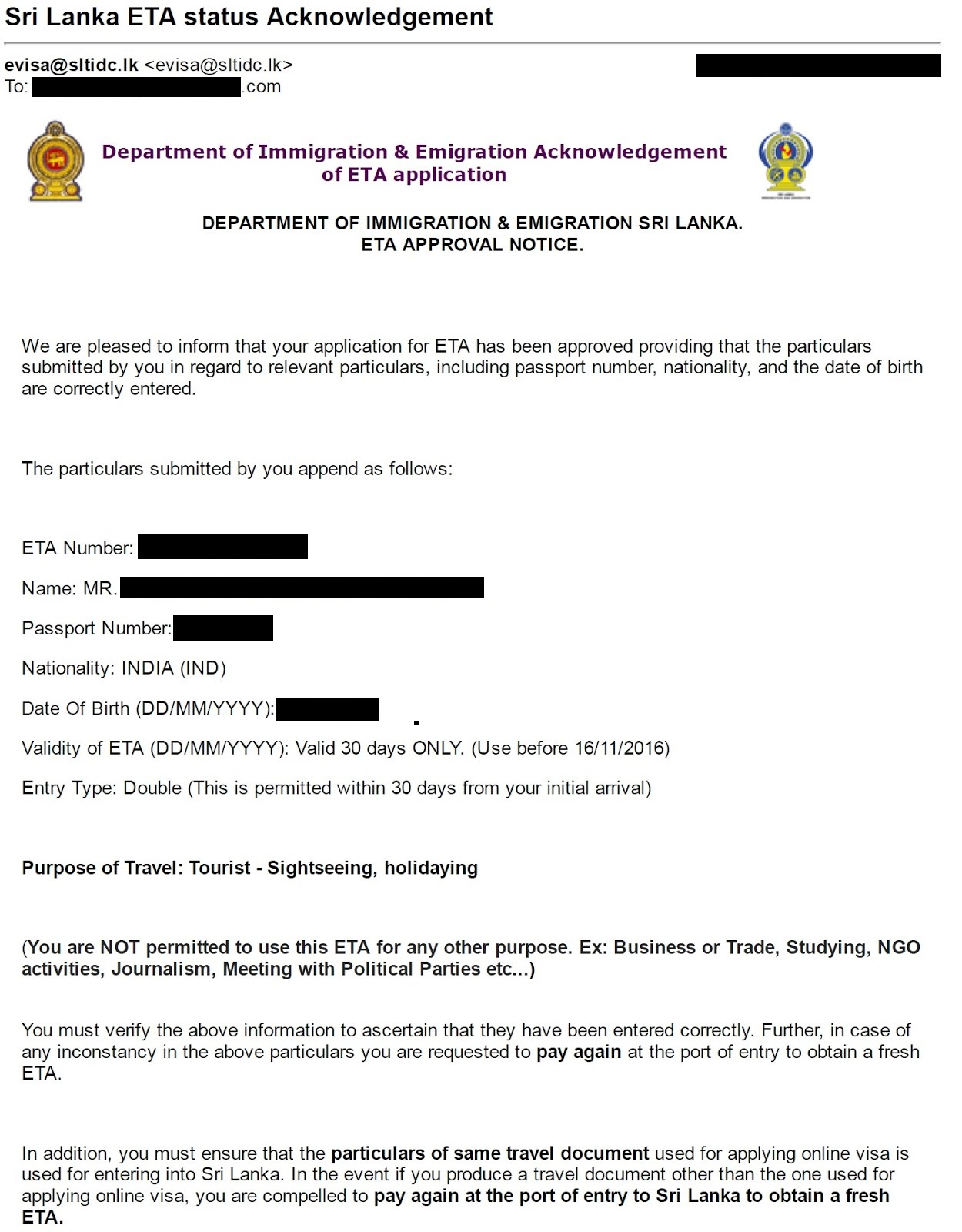
- Sample of Sri Lankan ETA Approval Notice
- Owners: Department of Immigration & Emigration
- Website: eta.gov.lk

Citizens of the following countries are eligible to independently obtain a free Electronic Travel Authorization (ETA) to enter Sri Lanka for the following period:

90 days

- Maldives

30 days

- Australia
- Austria
- Bahrain
- Belarus
- Belgium
- Canada
- China^{1}
- Czech Republic
- Denmark
- Finland
- France
- Germany
- Hong Kong^{1}
- India
- Indonesia
- Iran
- Israel
- Italy
- Japan
- Kazakhstan
- Kuwait
- Macau^{1}
- Malaysia
- Nepal
- Netherlands
- New Zealand
- Norway
- Oman
- Pakistan
- Poland
- Qatar
- Russia
- Saudi Arabia
- Seychelles
- Singapore
- South Africa
- South Korea
- Spain
- Sweden
- Switzerland
- Thailand
- Turkey
- United Arab Emirates
- United Kingdom
- United States

_{1 - For Chinese citizens with People's Republic of China passports, Hong Kong Special Administrative Region passports or Macao Special Administrative Region passports only. When applying for an ETA, visitors with these passports should select China as nationality because Hong Kong / Macau is not available as a nationality option.}

Citizens of other countries, except those mentioned in the "Sponsor required" section, may independently apply for an Electronic Travel Authorization (ETA) valid for 30 days, for a fee.

=== Sponsor required ===
Citizens of the following countries can not apply for ETA independently. They must obtain a visa through a Sri Lankan sponsor:

- Cameroon
- Ghana
- Ivory Coast
- Kosovo
- Nigeria
- North Korea
- Syria
- Taiwan

The following documents should be submitted to the Head office of the Department of Immigration and Emigration Head Office, Battaramulla, through the Sri Lankan sponsor for consideration of the visa application:

- Request letter from the Sri Lankan sponsor
- Affidavit from the Sri Lankan sponsor signed before a Justice of the Peace or lawyer
- Certified copy of the national identity card or passport photocopy of the Sri Lankan sponsor
- Applicant's police clearance report (not required for citizens of Kosovo and Taiwan)
- Applicant's passport photocopy
- Proof of accommodation

== Visa exemption ==
=== Non-ordinary passports ===
Holders of diplomatic, official, service or special passports of the following countries may enter Sri Lanka without a visa for the following period:

90 days

- Maldives^{D O S Sp}

90 days within any 180 days

- Georgia^{D O S}
- Romania^{D O S}

60 days, 90 days within any 1 year

- Seychelles^{D O S Sp}

30 days

- Bahrain^{D Sp}
- Bangladesh^{D O S}
- Belarus^{D O}
- Benin^{D O S}
- Brazil^{D O S}
- Cambodia^{D O S}
- Chile^{D O}
- China^{D O PA S}
- Cuba^{D}
- Hong Kong^{D O S}
- India^{D O}
- Indonesia^{D O S}
- Iran^{D O S}
- Kazakhstan^{D S}
- Kenya^{D S}
- Myanmar^{D O S}
- Oman^{D S Sp}
- Pakistan^{D O}
- Philippines^{D O S}
- Qatar^{D O}
- Russia^{D O S}
- Singapore^{D O S Sp}
- Thailand^{D O S}
- Vietnam^{D O S}

30 days within any 60 days

- Ukraine^{D O S}

_{D - Diplomatic passports}
_{O - Official passports}
_{PA - Passports for public affairs}
_{S - Service passports}
_{Sp - Special passports}

- Holders of a United Nations Passport, regardless of nationality, may enter Sri Lanka without a visa for a maximum stay of up to 90 days.
- Holders of a Interpol Passport, regardless of nationality, may enter Sri Lanka without a visa for a maximum stay of up to 90 days.

== Mandatory yellow fever vaccination ==
Citizens of the following countries must present a yellow fever vaccination certificate upon arrival in order to enter Sri Lanka:

- Angola
- Argentina
- Benin
- Bolivia
- Brazil
- Burkina Faso
- Burundi
- Cameroon
- Central African Republic
- Chad
- Colombia
- DR Congo
- Ecuador
- Equatorial Guinea
- Ethiopia
- Gabon
- Gambia
- Ghana
- Guinea
- Guinea-Bissau
- Liberia
- Mali
- Mauritania
- Niger
- Nigeria
- Panama
- Peru
- Rwanda
- São Tomé and Príncipe
- Senegal
- Sierra Leone
- Somalia
- Sudan
- Suriname
- Tanzania
- Togo
- Uganda
- Venezuela

== History ==
In 2012, Sri Lanka launched an Electronic Travel Authorisation (ETA) system, created and operated by Mobitel, a state-owned enterprise.

On 17 April 2024, Sri Lanka replaced its previous Electronic Travel Authorisation system with a new e-Visa system, operated by VFS Global.

On 2 August 2024, the Supreme Court of Sri Lanka issued an interim order, which suspended the e-Visa system operated by VFS Global and ordered the restoration of the previous ETA system operated by Mobitel.

On 4 August 2024, Ada Derana reported that the Ministry of Public Security would make a final decision the next day, and noted that the suspension of the e-Visa system meant that tourists needed to obtain their visas on arrival.

On 5 August 2024, the Department of Immigration and Emigration notified the Sri Lankan diplomatic missions around the world of the discontinuation of the e-Visa system. According to Minister of Public Security Tiran Alles, the old ETA system has yet to be reinstated due to changes made to the Department of Immigration and Emigration's computer system.

On 2 September 2024, Sri Lanka decided to implement visa-free access for citizens of 38 countries, including India, China, Thailand, the UK, the USA, and Indonesia. Although it was initially planned to be implemented on 1 October 2024, the decision was advanced due to the inconvenience caused to tourists at the visa-on-arrival counters, where overcrowding was a significant issue.

The ETA system is experiencing constant problems. The most recently reported issue occurred on 4 March 2026. Until the note is removed from the IATA Timatic system, travelers can still obtain a visa on arrival.

== Visitor statistics ==
Most visitors arriving in Sri Lanka on a short-term basis were from the following countries:

Foreign visitors to Sri Lanka
Country	2026 (Jan)	2025	2024	2023	2022	2021	2020	2019	2018
India	52,061	531,511	416,974	302,844	123,004	56,268	89,357	355,002	
United Kingdom	29,540	212,277	178,339	130,088	85,187	16,646	55,455	198,776	
Russia	27,134	186,580	201,920	197,498	91,272	16,984	49,397	86,549	
Germany	17,776	147,966	136,084	102,539	55,542	12,442	34,507	134,899	
China	14,003	132,035	131,681	68,789	4,715	2,417	26,147	167,863	
France	13,569	109,041	88,775	56,251	35,482	6,549	24,838	87,623	
Australia	11,172	109,487	89,573	67,436	30,924	4,421	20,283	92,674	
Netherlands	7,107	64,164	50,116	29,056	11,987	2,422	8,656	38,993	
United States	7,373	65,973	59,532	46,344	22,230	6,124	16,842	68,832	
Bangladesh	4,102	59,563	39,555	17,846	3,817	1,496	1,986	8,261	
Poland	10,334	49,989	44,165	17,946	15,195	2,110	11,908	20,896	
Italy	5,840	50,430	38,709	22,242	7,449	1,309	8,603	36,147	
Spain	3,008	46,038	37,928	23,905	12,895	2,015	3,385	24,489	
Canada	5,048	46,133	42,212	43,944	26,845	5,079	12,346	48,729	
Japan	2,896	38,153	30,429	19,583	3,087	392	6,644	30,079	
Maldives	4,789	37,165	47,222	37,298	18,880	6,272	9,407	60,278	
Switzerland	4,146	33,624	29,829	23,556	13,260	2,974	6,389	29,981	
Malaysia	1,566	23,684	18,259	10,940	2,779	323	3,494	16,861	
Israel	3,455	24,591	24,845	19,517	9,326	1,724	3,556	14,770	
Pakistan	1,584	22,296	13,451	10,744	6,260	7,520	3,065	14,655	
Belgium	1,915	21,056	17,219	10,667	6,164	1,283	3,371	14,948	
Czech Republic	3,265	19,082	19,279	12,056	7,350	1,864	7,599	19,204	
Austria	2,811	18,188	17,103	10,594	5,541	1,502	4,300	14,713	
Denmark	3,372	17,378	14,952	10,346	7,278	1,302	4,905	16,869	
Singapore	1,138	15,086	12,591	9,551	3,770	557	2,545	13,871	
New Zealand	1,103	13,456	11,282	7,913	2,866	325	2,324	12,463	
Norway	1,717	13,032	11,399	8,747	5,983	1,141	3,019	13,446	
South Korea	1,898	12,169	10,800	7,298	1,843	389	2,499	12,195	
Sweden	2,605	14,863	8,643	5,097	1,601	7,061	22,464		
Ireland		9,388	8,747	5,136	3,056	559	2,294	8,254	
Iran		9,143	10,858	10,322	4,301	397	648	3,249	
Kazakhstan		8,510	11,383	5,130	8,068	5,754	2,333	2,399	
Belarus		8,497	10,933	10,969	3,621	646	2,638	4,796	
Thailand		7,812	7,246	4,922	1,725	247	1,880	9,861	
Ukraine		7, 515	7,099	5,082	14,917	7,037	17,169	35,051	
Turkey		7,434	6,673	3,739	1,514	309	2,121	4,972	
Portugal		7,281	6,489	3,943	1,906	372	1,602	5,193	
Slovakia		6,346	6,710	4,464	2,432	664	1,513	4,944	
Philippines		6,269	5,267	4,164	1,961	529	4,249	14,590	
Lithuania		5,855	6,395	2,722	2,115	383	1,054	2,793	
Saudi Arabia		5,785	5,887	6,797	5,952	1,596	4,755	15,707	
Hungary		5,455	6,580	3,786	2,324	445	1,588	4,091	
United Arab Emirates		5,275	4,296						
Nepal		5,182	4,463	4,750	1,065	325	1,384	5,414	
Romania		5,036	6,407	4,092	3,313	820	1,724	5,463	
Indonesia		4,599	3,744						
South Africa		4,427	4,872	3,444	1,502	272	1,364	7,132	
Finland		4,249	4,276	2,287	1,500	341	2,298	7,028	
Egypt		3,877	4,069	3,091	2,340	400	956	3,708	
Greece		3,813	2,853						
Bulgaria		3,638	3,699						
Vietnam		3,462	2,963						
Estonia		3,445	3,800	1,808	978	376	1,185	2,516	
Slovenia		3,234	3,477	1,927	602	91	800	2,926	
Lebanon		3,085	3,438	3,347	1,606	547	483	4,304	
Latvia		3,021	3,570						
Seychelles		2,890	2,691						
Jordan		2,704	2,823						
Oman		2,473	2,775						
Myanmar		2,410	1,515						
Armenia		2,067	2,634						
Serbia		2,034	2,015						
Brazil		1,847	1,945						
Croatia		1,741	1,859						
Kuwait		1,739	1,885						
Iraq		1,560	1,012						
Azerbaijan		1,252	2,035						
Bahrain		1,229	1,169						
Sudan		1,178	941						
Cyprus		1,132	1,194						
Cambodia		1,121	1,183						
Kenya		1,052	807						
Mexico		1,031	1,068						
Morocco		1,021	1,042						
Taiwan	n/a	n/a	4,999	363	42	1,985	7,127		
Countries below 1000		22,248							
Total		2,103,593	2,053,465	1,487,303	719,978	194,495	507,704	1,913,702	

== See also ==
- Visa requirements for Sri Lankan citizens
- Tourism in Sri Lanka
- Foreign relations of Sri Lanka
- Sri Lankan passport
