= Sri Lankan nationality law =

Citizenship Act

Parliament of Ceylon
- Citation: No. 18 of 1948
- Territorial extent: Sri Lanka
- Enacted by: 1st Parliament of Ceylon
- Commenced: 15 November 1948

Amended by
- Acts No. 40 of 1950, No. 13 of 1955, No. 45 of 1987, No. 15 of 1993, No. 43 of 1993 and No. 16 of 2003
- Status: Amended

Sri Lankan nationality law governs the acquisition, retention and loss of citizenship in Sri Lanka. The principal legislation is the Citizenship Act, No. 18 of 1948, which came into force on 15 November 1948 and remains in force as amended. Article 26 of the Constitution of Sri Lanka establishes a single status of Sri Lankan citizenship, irrespective of whether citizenship was acquired by descent or registration.

Sri Lankan citizenship is primarily acquired by descent. A person born in Sri Lanka on or after 15 November 1948 generally acquires citizenship if at least one parent was a Sri Lankan citizen at the time of birth. A person born abroad to a Sri Lankan citizen parent may also acquire citizenship by descent, subject to statutory birth-registration requirements. Citizenship by registration is available to persons with certain qualifying parental or marital connections to Sri Lanka and to limited categories of other applicants. Sri Lankan law does not provide a general pathway to naturalisation based solely on a foreign national's length of residence in the country.

Sri Lankan law permits dual citizenship through provisions allowing eligible persons to retain or resume Sri Lankan citizenship while holding another nationality. Official consular guidance restricts the programme to two nationalities and describes consequences for acquiring a third nationality.

The development of Sri Lankan nationality law was significantly influenced by the citizenship status of people of Indian origin, particularly plantation workers and their descendants. Legislation enacted shortly after independence excluded large numbers of this population from citizenship, resulting in widespread statelessness. Subsequent legislation, particularly during the 1980s and 2000s, addressed this situation.

== Historical development ==
=== Colonial period and independence ===
Before independence, Ceylon was a British colony, and its inhabitants generally held the status of British subjects. The Naturalization Ordinance, No. 21 of 1890, provided a mechanism for qualifying foreign residents to acquire British subject status.

Ceylon became independent from the United Kingdom on 4 February 1948. The Citizenship Act, No. 18 of 1948, enacted later that year, came into force on 15 November 1948 and established a separate status of citizenship of Ceylon. Citizenship could be acquired by descent or by registration under the Act or other legislation providing for registration in specified circumstances.

The original legislation generally based citizenship by descent on paternal ancestry. Persons born before 15 November 1948 were subject to requirements concerning the birthplaces of their fathers or paternal ancestors, while persons born subsequently generally acquired citizenship by descent through their fathers. These provisions were substantially amended in 2003.

=== Amendments to the Citizenship Act ===
The Citizenship Act, No. 18 of 1948, remains Sri Lanka's principal nationality statute. It has been directly amended by six Acts: No. 40 of 1950, No. 13 of 1955, No. 45 of 1987, No. 15 of 1993, No. 43 of 1993 and No. 16 of 2003.

Amendment	Principal changes
Citizenship (Amendment) Act, No. 40 of 1950	Introduced provisions concerning the resumption of citizenship and restrictions on dual citizenship.
Citizenship (Amendment) Act, No. 13 of 1955	Amended citizenship-registration provisions, including provisions affecting the registration of spouses, widows and widowers of citizens.
Citizenship (Amendment) Act, No. 45 of 1987	Introduced statutory provisions allowing the retention and resumption of Sri Lankan citizenship alongside another nationality.
Citizenship (Amendment) Act, No. 15 of 1993	Amended sections 19 and 26 concerning fees payable for citizenship declarations and certificates.
Citizenship (Amendment) Act, No. 43 of 1993	Introduced section 13A, permitting discretionary citizenship registration of qualifying participants in the Resident Guest Scheme.
Citizenship (Amendment) Act, No. 16 of 2003	Extended citizenship by descent through either parent, introduced transitional provisions and amended citizenship-registration requirements.

The 1987 and 1993 amendments were particularly important for the administration of dual citizenship and the introduction of exceptional registration provisions. The 2003 amendment addressed longstanding gender-based distinctions in citizenship by descent.

=== Citizenship of people of Indian and Pakistani origin ===
The Citizenship Act of 1948 and the Indian and Pakistani Residents (Citizenship) Act, No. 3 of 1949, had significant consequences for people of Indian origin living in Ceylon, particularly descendants of plantation workers recruited during British colonial rule.

The citizenship requirements and registration procedures excluded a substantial proportion of this population, leaving many without recognised citizenship in either Ceylon or India. The resulting statelessness was closely associated with the disenfranchisement and political marginalisation of the Indian-origin Tamil population.

The Indian and Pakistani Residents (Citizenship) Act, No. 3 of 1949, established a separate citizenship-registration procedure for certain long-term residents. It was subsequently amended by Act No. 37 of 1950 and Act No. 45 of 1952.

=== Indo-Ceylon agreements and implementing legislation ===
The governments of Ceylon and India negotiated bilateral agreements concerning the nationality of people of Indian origin living in Ceylon. The Sirima–Shastri Pact of 30 October 1964 and the Sirimavo–Gandhi Agreement of 1974 provided for the allocation of citizenship between the two countries and the repatriation of certain residents to India. Implementation was prolonged, leaving substantial numbers without citizenship.

The Indo-Ceylon Agreement (Implementation) Act, No. 14 of 1967, established legal and administrative mechanisms for implementing the 1964 agreement, including the registration of qualifying persons as citizens of Ceylon. The Act was subsequently amended by Act No. 43 of 1971 and Act No. 47 of 1981.

The Indo-Ceylon Agreement (Implementation) (Amendment) Act, No. 47 of 1981, revised section 8 of the 1967 Act concerning the proportion of applicants granted Sri Lankan citizenship in relation to those recognised as Indian citizens.

=== Legislation addressing statelessness ===
The Grant of Citizenship to Stateless Persons Act, No. 5 of 1986, provided for granting Sri Lankan citizenship to specified stateless persons of Indian origin. The Grant of Citizenship to Stateless Persons (Special Provisions) Act, No. 39 of 1988, established further provisions for people of Indian origin who remained stateless.

The Grant of Citizenship to Persons of Indian Origin Act, No. 35 of 2003, conferred citizenship on qualifying persons of Indian origin who had been permanent residents of Sri Lanka since 30 October 1964, or were resident descendants of such persons. Separate declaration requirements applied to qualifying persons holding Indian passports or similar documents.

The United Nations High Commissioner for Refugees supported implementation of the 2003 legislation, which was intended to resolve longstanding statelessness among the Indian-origin Tamil population.

=== Amendments of 2009 ===
Two further Acts amended the special citizenship legislation in 2009, extending provisions affecting certain persons of Indian origin who had been compelled to leave Sri Lanka and take up residence in India.

The Grant of Citizenship to Stateless Persons (Special Provisions) (Amendment) Act, No. 5 of 2009, amended Act No. 39 of 1988 by inserting section 2A. It addressed the citizenship status of qualifying persons of Indian origin who had been compelled to leave Sri Lanka in circumstances beyond their control and had consequently been unable to satisfy the original residence requirements.

The Grant of Citizenship to Persons of Indian Origin (Amendment) Act, No. 6 of 2009, similarly amended Act No. 35 of 2003. It addressed the citizenship status of qualifying persons or descendants of persons who had been permanent residents of Sri Lanka from 30 October 1964 but had been compelled to leave for India. The amendment also specified declaration and citizenship-certificate requirements.

Both amendments were enacted on 18 February 2009 and are amendments to their respective special citizenship statutes, not to the Citizenship Act, No. 18 of 1948.

=== Citizenship of persons of Chinese origin ===
The Grant of Citizenship to Persons of Chinese Origin (Special Provisions) Act, No. 38 of 2008, established a separate citizenship-registration mechanism for qualifying persons of Chinese origin who had been permanently resident in Sri Lanka since 15 November 1948 and certain qualifying descendants.

The legislation provided a five-year application period beginning on 31 October 2008. The application period ended in October 2013, although provisions concerning confirmation of citizenship previously acquired under the Act remain relevant.

== Constitutional framework ==
Article 26 of the Constitution establishes one status of citizenship, known as the status of a citizen of Sri Lanka. The Constitution prohibits distinctions between citizens solely on the basis of whether citizenship was acquired by descent or by registration.

Article 26 also regulates deprivation of citizenship by requiring compliance with specified provisions of the Citizenship Act. The constitutional framework therefore operates alongside the statutory rules on citizenship acquisition and loss.

== Acquisition of citizenship ==
=== Citizenship by descent ===
Under section 5(1) of the Citizenship Act, as amended in 2003, a person born in Sri Lanka on or after 15 November 1948 generally acquires citizenship by descent if either parent was a Sri Lankan citizen at the time of birth. Birth within Sri Lankan territory alone does not ordinarily confer citizenship where neither parent is a citizen.

Section 5(2) provides for citizenship by descent for persons born outside Sri Lanka to a Sri Lankan citizen parent. Such births must be registered in the prescribed manner, ordinarily within one year of birth, although a longer period may be permitted by the responsible Minister for good cause.

Registration may be undertaken through a Sri Lankan consular officer in the country of birth or through the responsible authority in Sri Lanka.

Section 5A, introduced in 2003, provides transitional arrangements for certain persons born before the amendment who did not acquire citizenship under the earlier rules. These include specified persons whose mother was a Sri Lankan citizen at birth, as well as certain persons whose parent subsequently acquired citizenship.

Section 7 provides that a newly born abandoned infant first found in Sri Lanka, whose parentage is unknown and cannot be ascertained, is presumed to be a Sri Lankan citizen by descent until the contrary is proved.

=== Citizenship by registration ===
The Citizenship Act provides citizenship by registration in specified circumstances. Unlike nationality laws that establish a general naturalisation route following a prescribed period of residence, Sri Lankan law does not establish such a route for ordinary foreign residents.

Citizenship by registration is available to certain persons meeting specified family-connection requirements or exceptional statutory criteria. Meeting a residence requirement alone does not establish eligibility for citizenship.

==== Persons with qualifying parental connections ====
Section 11 provides for the registration of certain persons with qualifying parental citizenship connections to Sri Lanka. These include specified circumstances in which a person did not acquire citizenship by descent because a birth abroad was not registered as required, or where a parent ceased to hold Sri Lankan citizenship.

Eligibility is subject to the applicable statutory qualifications, including adulthood, mental capacity and ordinary residence in Sri Lanka. The 2003 amendment revised the relevant provisions to recognise citizenship connections through either parent.

==== Foreign spouses of Sri Lankan citizens ====
Section 12 provides a registration route for a foreign national who is the spouse, widow or widower of a Sri Lankan citizen.

An applicant must meet the statutory conditions, including residence in Sri Lanka throughout the one-year period immediately preceding the application, together with the applicable requirements concerning adulthood, mental capacity and ordinary residence.

Citizenship is not automatically conferred by marriage or completion of the residence requirement. The Minister may refuse registration if granting citizenship would not be in the public interest.

==== Exceptional registration ====
Section 13 permits discretionary citizenship registration for a limited number of persons who have rendered distinguished public service or achieved eminence in specified professional, commercial, industrial or agricultural fields.

Applicants must satisfy additional statutory requirements, including those concerning ordinary residence in Sri Lanka. The Act limits the number of persons registered under this provision to 25 in any year.

=== Resident Guest Scheme ===
Section 13A of the Citizenship Act provides for discretionary citizenship registration of certain qualifying participants in the Resident Guest Scheme, a programme established for foreign investors and professionals.

Eligibility under this provision required specified residence conditions and substantial contributions to Sri Lanka's economic development or social and cultural life. Participation in the scheme did not itself confer an entitlement to citizenship.

However, the Resident Guest Scheme is no longer open to new visa applicants. Regulation 13(7), introduced through Gazette Extraordinary No. 2360/24 of 27 November 2023, prohibits the issuance of new visas under the scheme while permitting extensions for existing visa holders.

Although section 13A remains part of the Citizenship Act, the closure of the underlying visa scheme means that it no longer provides a route for new entrants to obtain citizenship through the Resident Guest Scheme.

=== Citizenship under special legislation ===
Separate legislation has provided citizenship to specifically defined groups, particularly persons affected by historical statelessness. These provisions are distinct from the ordinary registration mechanisms under the Citizenship Act.

The principal enactments include the Indian and Pakistani Residents (Citizenship) Act, No. 3 of 1949; the Indo-Ceylon Agreement (Implementation) Act, No. 14 of 1967; the Grant of Citizenship to Stateless Persons Act, No. 5 of 1986; the Grant of Citizenship to Stateless Persons (Special Provisions) Act, No. 39 of 1988; the Grant of Citizenship to Persons of Indian Origin Act, No. 35 of 2003; and the Grant of Citizenship to Persons of Chinese Origin (Special Provisions) Act, No. 38 of 2008.

== Loss and renunciation of citizenship ==
The Citizenship Act provides for the loss of Sri Lankan citizenship in specified circumstances.

Under section 19(1), a citizen of full age and sound mind may renounce citizenship by making a declaration in the prescribed manner. Renunciation takes effect when the declaration is registered in accordance with the Act.

Sections 20 and 21 regulate loss of citizenship in connection with the acquisition or possession of another nationality. Voluntary acquisition of foreign citizenship can cause Sri Lankan citizenship to cease by operation of law unless the person benefits from an applicable statutory provision permitting retention.

The Act also provides for loss of citizenship in certain circumstances where another nationality is acquired by operation of foreign law. The legal consequences depend on the circumstances of acquisition and the applicable statutory provisions.

== Dual citizenship ==
Sri Lankan nationality law permits dual citizenship through provisions allowing eligible persons to retain or resume Sri Lankan citizenship while holding the nationality of another country.

The relevant statutory arrangements were introduced through the Citizenship (Amendment) Act, No. 45 of 1987. Applications are administered by the Department of Immigration and Emigration.

=== Retention and resumption ===
Section 19(2) provides for resumption of Sri Lankan citizenship by certain persons whose citizenship previously ceased. An eligible former citizen may apply to resume Sri Lankan citizenship while retaining another nationality.

Section 19(3) provides for retention of citizenship by a Sri Lankan citizen who intends to acquire another nationality. An eligible applicant may seek permission to retain Sri Lankan citizenship rather than losing it upon acquisition of foreign citizenship.

Both routes require an application and official approval. Citizenship retention or resumption is not automatic. The Minister must be satisfied that granting the relevant declaration would be of benefit to Sri Lanka.

=== Restrictions concerning a third nationality ===
Sri Lanka's officially administered dual-citizenship programme restricts applicants who already possess multiple foreign nationalities.

According to the High Commission of Sri Lanka in Australia, individuals already holding citizenship in two or more countries are not eligible to apply for Sri Lankan dual citizenship. Its published guidance states that the programme is intended for qualifying applicants holding citizenship or permanent residence in one other country.

The High Commission's passport guidance further states that persons granted Sri Lankan dual citizenship must maintain the foreign nationality recorded on their dual-citizenship certificate. According to that guidance, acquiring citizenship of a third country after being granted Sri Lankan dual citizenship results in automatic revocation of their Sri Lankan dual-citizenship status.

These restrictions are described in official consular guidance. Section 19 of the Citizenship Act itself does not expressly formulate a universal numerical limit of two nationalities.

=== Restrictions on political office ===
Although dual citizenship is permitted, the Constitution restricts eligibility for certain elected offices.

Article 91(1)(d)(xiii), inserted by the Twenty-first Amendment to the Constitution in 2022, disqualifies a Sri Lankan citizen who also holds citizenship of another country from being elected to the Parliament of Sri Lanka.

Article 92 applies the relevant parliamentary disqualifications to eligibility for election as President of Sri Lanka.

== See also ==
- Sri Lankan passport
- Visa requirements for Sri Lankan citizens
- Indian Tamils of Sri Lanka
- Statelessness
- Dual citizenship
