= National identity card (Sri Lanka) =

National identity card of Sri Lanka

National Identity Card
- Type: Identity card
- Issued by: Sri Lanka
- First issued: 14 September 1972; 27 October 2017 (Smart card)
- Purpose: Identification
- Valid in: Sri Lanka
- Eligibility: Sri Lankan citizenship, 15 years of age or above
- Expiration: N/A

The National Identity Card (NIC) is the identity document in use in Sri Lanka. It is compulsory for all Sri Lankan citizens who are fifteen years of age and older to have their NICs. NICs are issued by the Department for Registration of Persons.

== History ==
The original intention was to issue a book form identity card very much like the driving license of the 1970s because of the need to accommodate the 2"x2" size photos which were the norm at the time. This resulted in limited use of the ID. For example, fishermen could not use it as the book would get wet. It was necessary to make it easy to carry and waterproof while standing up to rough handling.

T. B. Ekanayake, the first Commissioner of Registration of Persons, contacted Dr. D. B. Nihalsingha, the Director of the Government Film Unit, and handed over the responsibility for the design of an easy to carry the card. Gaspe Ratnayake, the artist of the GFU, designed the card, which is the same design even today. For the first time 35mm still film was proposed by Dr. Nihalsingha and the aid of the GDR was sought. The GDR donated 5000 35mm Praktica cameras along with 400-foot rolls of 35mm cine film and spare cassettes to load the film. These were issued to studios around the country with instructions as to how to pose the photo. 35mm still photography became the norm with this step and the 2"x2" Rolleiflex photos receded. In February 1972, Ekanayake stated that all legal citizens will be issued identity cards.

It is compulsory for a bearer to hold the card at all times (apart from the NIC, a driving license, Sri Lankan passport or temporary identification document can be used) and show the cards to police officers conducting regular screening while on patrol, checkpoints for instance. The police may detain suspicious individuals who fail to show any form of legal identification until relevant identification can be produced in person or by proxy. The NIC is also a required document for some government procedures, for commercial transactions such as the opening of a bank account, and for entry to high-security government or private premises by surrendering or exchanging for an entry pass. Failure to produce the card may result in denied access to these premises or denial of goods and services. Most notably it is required to apply for a passport (over 16), driving license (over 18) and to vote (over 18).

== NIC number ==
The NIC number is used for unique person identification, similar into the social security number in the US.

=== NIC number until 2015 ===
NICs issued before 1 January 2016, each NIC has a unique 9 digit number and a letter, in the format 911042754V (where 0 is a digit and V is a letter). The first two digits of the number are the holder's year of birth (e.g.: 91 for someone born in 1991). The next three digits contain the number of the day in the year for the person's birth. For women, 500 is added to the number of days. The next three digits are serial number of the issued day. The next digit is the check digit. The final letter is generally a 'V' which indicates that the holder is eligible to vote in the area. In some cases the final letter can be 'X' which usually indicates the holder is not eligible to vote; possibly because they were not permanent residents of Sri Lanka when applying for an NIC.

=== NIC number since 2016 ===
From 1 January 2016, each new NIC has a unique 12 digit number. The first four digits of the number are the holder's year of birth (e.g.: 197419202757 for someone born in 1974). The next three digits contain the number of days till his birthday from January 1. For women, 500 is added to the number of days. The next four digits are the serial number. The last digit is the check digit.

Conversion of Old NIC number to New NIC number
	Birth by year	Birth day of the year	Serial number	Check digit	Special letter
Old NIC number	74	192	275	7	V
New NIC number	1974	192	0275	7	-

== Markings ==
At the top center of the card the word "Sri Lanka" is printed in the Sinhala and Tamil languages.

The purple number on the right of the Sri Lankan emblem represents the Province from which the application was made. The numbers range from 1–9. The numbering convention is as follows:

1. Western Province
2. Central Province
3. Southern Province
4. Northern Province
5. Eastern Province
6. North Western Province
7. North Central Province
8. Uva Province
9. Sabaragamuwa Province

== Alternate identity cards ==
The Department of Post has been issuing an identity card known as Postal IDs since the 1940s with a validity of five years for prof of identification related to financial transactions carried out via the postal service such as money orders. This may be gained in lieu of a NIC if the latter is unable to be issued. This is commonly used by students who have not reached sixteen or by adults who need identity document sooner than a NIC could be issued or to a person a NIC cannot be issued to. In certain cases, a driving license may be used.

== eNIC ==
Sri Lanka is in the process of developing a smart card based RFID NIC card which will replace the obsolete 'laminated type' cards by storing the holders information on a chip that can be read by banks, offices etc. thereby reducing the need to have documentation of these informations physically by storing in the cloud.

== See also ==
- Sri Lankan passport
- Driving licence in Sri Lanka
