= Machan (2008 film) =

2008 Sri Lankan comedy film directed by Uberto Pasolini

- Theatrical poster
- Directed by: Uberto Pasolini
- Written by: Ruwanthie de Chickera; Uberto Pasolini
- Produced by: Uberto Pasolini; Conchita Airoldi; Henning Molfenter; Prasanna Vithanage
- Starring: Dharmapriya Dias; Gihan De Chickera; Darshan Dharmaraj; Namal Jayasinghe; Sujeewa Priyalal; Mahendra Perera
- Cinematography: Stefano Falivene
- Edited by: Masahiro Hirakubo
- Music by: Lakshman Joseph De Saram; Stephen Warbeck
- Production companies: Redgrave Films; Rai Cinema; Baselberg Films; Shakthi Films
- Distributed by: UGC; Yume Pictures; CEL Theaters
- Release dates: 28 August 2008 (Venice Film Festival); September 2009 (Italy)
- Running time: 109 minutes
- Countries: Italy; Sri Lanka
- Languages: Sinhala; English
- Budget: €5 million
- Box office: $282,884

Machan is a 2008 Italian-Sri Lankan comedy film written, directed, and produced by Uberto Pasolini as his directorial debut about the made-up "Sri Lankan National Handball Team" that travelled to Germany in 2004, lost some games, and vanished.

== Background ==
Based upon a true story, the film was shot on locations in Sri Lanka and Germany. The inspiration came from the actual case of the 2004 incident, where a fake Sri Lankan national handball team via Asian-German Sports Exchange Program tricked its way into a German tournament, lost all of their matches, and subsequently vanished. Production spent several weeks speaking with people in the less fortunate areas of Colombo and used the people met through that research to create the backgrounds of the main characters. When director Uberto Pasolini heard of the incident, he stated "I fell in love with the story so much that I decided to shoot it myself". Under the working title of Handball, the film was produced and financed by Redgrave Films (UK), Rai Cinema (Italy), Babelsberg Films (Germany), and Shakthi Films (Sri Lanka), and had its premiere at the Venice Film Festival in August 2008, where it received a 10-minute standing ovation.

After the film completed its rounds of film festivals, it had commercial theatrical debut in Italy in September 2009, and was then picked up by UGC for theatrical distribution in Germany, France, Switzerland, Canada, Belgium, Norway and Sweden, and by Yume Pictures for theatrical release in the United Kingdom October 2009 and DVD distribution April 2010.

== Synopsis ==
Two friends, Manoj (Gihan De Chickera), a bartender, and Stanley (Dharmapriya Dias), a fruit vendor, wish to emigrate to the West to seek their fortune, but have difficulties getting their visa applications approved. They come across an application to a handball tournament in Bavaria, and not even knowing what the game is, they submit themselves and a group of friends as the "Sri Lanka National Handball Team". For appearance's sake, they begin minimal training and then seek travel visas from the German Embassy. Manoj leaves the group at the last moment, but the rest fly to Germany. Their plan to simply escape into the West upon arrival in Germany is thwarted by the quick appearance of the tournament organizers and an arena of fans eager to see the powers of the Sri Lanka National Handball Team.

After losing the first matches without any goals, the team finally shoots a goal, which makes them overjoyed. The next morning, the police arrives and searches the hotel, but could not find any trace of the Sri Lankan Handball team. Later, it is shown that each member goes on his own path to various different countries in Europe.

== Cast ==
- Dharmapriya Dias as Stanley, addressed as "Machan"
- Gihan De Chickera as Manoj
- Darshan Dharmaraj as Suresh
- Namal Jayasinghe as Vijith
- Sujeewa Priyalal as Piyal
- Ravi Kumar as Neville
- Saumya Liyanage
- Irangani Serasinghe as Auntie Magie
- Dayadewa Edirisinghe as Naseem
- Sarath Karunaratne as PK
- Mangala Pradeep Kumara as VD
- Mahendra Perera as Ruwan
- Chathurika Pieris as Shalini
- Pradeepan Puwabalasingham as AJ
- Ronika Rannetthi as Esther
- Pitchchei Selvaraj as Nesa
- Jayani Senanayake as Jassmine
- Pubudu Chathuranga
- Sarath Kothalawala
- Lakshman Mendis as Vijitha's father
- Deepani Silva as their spoilt son's mother
- Nino Araliya Jayakody
- Bandula Vithanage as a drunk person
- Seetha Kumari as Manoj's grandmother
- Leonie Kotelawala as Neighbour

== Reception ==
The Guardian wrote, "There is more ingenuity, guts and brilliance in the developing world as depicted in Uberto Pasolini's film than anything Hollywood can cobble together ... There had never been a single handball team in the whole country, let alone a national side, and the scam has to go down as one of the most ingenious illegal immigration ploys ever undertaken."

== Awards and nominations ==
- 2008, Won FEDIC Award at Venice Film Festival
- 2008, Won Europa Cinemas Label Award for Best European film at Venice Film Festival
- 2008, Nominated for International Jury Award at São Paulo International Film Festival
- 2008, Won Audience Award at Kerala International Film Festival
- 2009, Won Audience Award for Best Film at Transilvania International Film Festival
- 2009, Won Best Feature Film at Palm Beach International Film Festival
- 2009, Won Best Screenplay at Durban International Film Festival
- 2009, Won Golden Iris for Best Film at Brussels European Film Festival
- 2009, Won RTBF TV Prize for Best Picture at Brussels European Film Festival
- 2009, Won Award of the Mayor of the City of Trenčín at Art Film Festival
- 2010, Won Best Film of the Year at the Sarasaviya Awards
