= Nowhere Special =

2020 drama film

- Film poster
- Directed by: Uberto Pasolini
- Written by: Uberto Pasolini
- Produced by: Uberto Pasolini; Chris Martin; Cristian Nicolescu; Roberto Sessa
- Starring: James Norton; Daniel Lamont
- Cinematography: Marius Panduru
- Edited by: Masahiro Hirakubo; Saska Simpson
- Music by: Andrew Simon McAllister
- Production companies: RAI Cinema; Picomedia; Digital Cube; Eurimages
- Distributed by: Lucky Red
- Release dates: 10 September 2020 (Venice); 16 July 2021 (United Kingdom)
- Running time: 96 minutes
- Countries: Italy; France
- Language: English
- Box office: $682,208

Nowhere Special is a 2020 internationally co-produced drama film written, directed, and produced by Uberto Pasolini. The film, set in Northern Ireland, stars James Norton and Daniel Lamont. The story follows John, a single parent to four-year-old Michael, who must make arrangements for the care of his son when he is faced with the reality of terminal illness.

It had its world premiere at the Venice Film Festival on 10 September 2020, and was released to cinemas in the United Kingdom on 16 July 2021 and opened in movie theaters in the United States on 26 April 2024.

== Plot ==
John, a single dad to four year old son Michael, has received a terminal cancer diagnosis. In his final exercise of urgency, the father must choose a new adoptive household for his son, as Michael's mother left them when Michael was 6 months old. To do this, he is forced to participate in a series of auditions; various potential parental pairs offer themselves, but simultaneously reveal themselves as repulsive or unsuitable. A woman, living alone, is the exception. She depicts herself as troubled, but honest about herself and her identity. She got pregnant as a teen and was forced to give her child up for adoption. Later when she married and wanted children with her husband, she was informed by doctors that she wouldn't be able to have any biological children. The woman was open to adoption but her husband was not, feeling he couldn't love a child that wasn't biologically his, so they separated.

John is reluctant to explain that he will be dying to Michael, fearing it would be too much for the young boy to handle. John's acquaintances are sympathetic to his situation and his social workers are eager for him to make a decision, but he hesitates as it will be the biggest decision he'll ever make, and he wants Michael to have the life and opportunities he never did.

Soon John's illness progresses and he has to give up his job as a window cleaner. Michael observes John's deterioration, witnessing him sleep a lot and have weak moments such as struggling to pour his orange juice. John finally explains the situation to Michael, and explains that though Michael won't be able to hear him physically, he'll be able to hear him inside in his heart. John puts together a memory box with letters for Michael to read when he reaches certain milestones, John's window cleaning tools, pictures taken at a fair ground, and a picture of Michael being held by his birth mum inside the young woman's glove that John found when cleaning out his light truck to sell. In the final minutes of the film John and Michael reveal that they have chosen the single mum as Michael's future parent.

== Cast ==
- James Norton as John
- Daniel Lamont as Michael
- Eileen O'Higgins as Shona
- Valerie O'Connor as Ella
- Valene Kane as Celia
- Keith McErlean as Phillip
- Siobhán McSweeney as Pam
- Chris Corrigan as Gerry
- Niamh McGrady as Lorraine
- Caolan Byrne as Trevor

== Production ==
In September 2019, it was announced that James Norton had joined the cast of the film, with Uberto Pasolini directing from a screenplay he wrote. Pasolini was inspired to write the script from a story he had read about a terminally ill father who needed to find a new family for his son before dying.

=== Filming ===
Principal photography began in August 2019.

== Release ==
The film had its world premiere at the Venice Film Festival on 10 September 2020. It was released in the United Kingdom on 16 July 2021 at Curzon Cinemas. The film was released by Cohen Media Group in the United States on 26 April 2024.

== Critical reception ==
On the review aggregator website Rotten Tomatoes, Nowhere Special holds an approval rating of 100% based on 65 reviews, with an average rating of 7.9/10.

In 2021, James Norton was nominated for a British Independent Film Award for Best Actor.
