= Still Life (2013 film) =

2013 drama film by Uberto Pasolini

- Directed by: Uberto Pasolini
- Written by: Uberto Pasolini
- Produced by: Felix Vossen; Christopher Simon; Uberto Pasolini; Ceri Hughes
- Starring: Eddie Marsan
- Cinematography: Stefano Falivene
- Edited by: Tracy Granger; Gavin Buckley
- Music by: Rachel Portman
- Production companies: Redwave Films; Embargo Films
- Release date: 3 September 2013 (Venice)
- Running time: 92 minutes
- Countries: United Kingdom; Italy
- Language: English

Still Life is a 2013 drama film written and directed by Uberto Pasolini. The film was presented at the 70th Venice Film Festival, where it won the award for Best Director in the category "Orizzonti". At the Reykjavik International Film Festival, Still Life received the top award (Golden Puffin) as well as the FIPRESCI Award. It also received the Black Pearl award (the highest award) at the Abu Dhabi Film Festival for "its humanity, empathy and grace in treating grief, solitude and death"; for his performance, Eddie Marsan won the Best British Actor award at the 2014 Edinburgh International Film Festival.

== Plot ==
John May is a man struggling with loneliness who works the Bona Vacantia office at Kennington Town Hall in London, where his main responsibility is locating the next of kin of people found dead in the district with no will and testament. Most cases are open-and-shut due to lack of leads, but when heirs are located, he often finds them hesitant to organise funerals for the deceased and so has taken to the practice of organising the funerals, writing eulogies for each deceased and attending the funerals himself, usually as the only mourner. His boss finds this practice time-consuming and expensive and so has decided to close his office down once he completes one final case: the death of William "Billy" Stoke. John discovers that the deceased was a neighbour he never knew, who lived in the same block of council flats, directly opposite him, and in direct view of his kitchen window.

Inspecting Stoke's flat, his sole lead is a series of photographs, one leading him to a pork pie factory. Most of the photographs are of an adult woman and a young girl. The many photos of the young girl stop abruptly; there are empty pages in the album and no photos of her much after the age of ten. John surmises that Stoke once had a wife and daughter, but there are no records or leads, no names, dates or labels, no identification of any kind.

John visits the pie factory and finds one of the workers who was friends with Stoke at the time. He asks the man if he had ever spoken of a wife or daughter to which the man replies that Stoke had never spoken of a family and that he left the factory for a lady who owned a fish and chip shop which Stoke frequented. John travels to where Stoke was living at the time and checks all the fish and chip shops in town until he locates Stoke's former lover, Mary, her adult daughter, and granddaughter. Mary discloses that Stoke is the father of her daughter, but that he left before he knew of her existence.

Mary tells John that they cannot be considered Stoke's kin as "he never wanted a family." She does, however, tell him that after Stokes abandoned her he probably landed himself in prison.

John manages to locate the prison Stoke was incarcerated in, and some documents that include a report written by a guard detailing a violent incident in which Stoke had a visitor in prison with the name "Kelly Stoke", with an address. This leads John to find Kelly, Stoke's other daughter, the daughter he knew. Kelly is visibly upset by the news of her father's death, but thanks John perfunctorily. Kelly discloses that her mother, the woman in the photo album and Stoke's former wife, had died three years earlier.

When John invites Kelly to the funeral, she declines. She gives him a photo of her father with Jumbo, taken when they were serving in the military in the Falklands. Jumbo remembers Stoke fondly but shows no interest in the funeral. Jumbo refers John to several parks and shelters where he had seen Stoke last. There John meets two homeless men who agree to talk to him in exchange for a drink, which they share with John while reminiscing about Stoke. However, they too show no interest in the funeral.

Considering this the end of the line, John returns to his office to ready it for decommissioning. As John climbs onto a chair and fastens his belt around a metal post, ambiguously viewed as either an attempt to recreate a stunt that Stoke had performed in prison, or to end his own life, he receives a phone call from Kelly asking if he will meet her the next day.

When they meet, John enthusiastically discusses the funeral he has planned for Stoke, including allocating his grave on John's favourite resting spot in the cemetery, and Kelly is clearly moved by John's consideration and care for her father's final arrangements. Kelly agrees to attend, and invites John to join her for tea after the funeral, which makes John smile for the first time in the film, and sincerely respond that he would like that very much.

After shopping for some small items for the funeral, including two mugs with dogs on them that he believes Kelly will appreciate, John is hit by a New Routemaster bus and bleeds to death on the road.

However, there is no one to locate his next of kin, since the office has closed down. No one shows up to his funeral. He is buried in an unmarked grave very close to Stoke's at the same time that Stoke's funeral is in progress.

Stoke's funeral is attended by all the people John contacted throughout the film on his behalf; Stoke's military mates in their dress berets, the homeless men, his former girlfriend and his two daughters and grandchild. Kelly occasionally looks around for John, and is momentarily struck when in doing so she notices the anonymous funeral procession with no mourners, unaware that it is John's. As Stoke's funeral party leaves Kelly looks over and sees attendants putting the last dirt on a new grave.

After John's funeral attendants depart, the ghost of Billy Stoke and of the other people whose cases John worked on while he was still alive begin to appear in the cemetery en masse and gather around John's grave.

== Cast ==
- Eddie Marsan as John May
- Joanne Froggatt as Kelly Stoke
- Andrew Buchan as Mr Pratchett
- Neil D'Souza as Shakthi
- Paul Anderson as Homeless
- Tim Potter as: Homeless
- Ciaran McIntyre as Jumbo

== Remake ==
A Japanese remake of Still Life, titled I Am Makimoto, was released in September 2022.
