= Greshan Dananjaya =

Sri Lankan track and field athlete

Personal information
- Nationality: Sri Lankan
- Born: June 7, 1997 (age 29) Sri Lanka
- Disappeared: June 2023; Geneva, Switzerland

Sport
- Country: Sri Lanka
- Sport: Track and field
- Event: Triple jump
- International level: 2019

Achievements and titles
- Personal best: 16.71 m (-0.5 m/s) Sri Lankan Record
Medal record
Men's athletics
Representing Sri Lanka
Event	1st	2nd	3rd
Olympic Games	0	0	0
World Championships	0	0	0
Asian Games	0	0	0
Asian Championships	0	0	0
Asian Junior Athletics Championships	0	0	0
Asian Grand Prix	0	0	0
South Asian Games	0	0	0
Continental Cup	0	0	0
Lusophony Games	0	0	0
Total	0	0	0
Event	1st	2nd	3rd
Triple jump	0	0	0

Greshan Dananjaya (born 7 June 1997 – disappeared June 2023), also known as Shreshan Dhananjaya Liyanapedige or L.P.G. Dhananjaya, is a Sri Lankan track and field athlete who disappeared in 2023. He specialized in the Triple jump, and holds the current Sri Lankan record for the event, with a jump of 16.71 m (-0.5 m/s) at the 2019 Sri Lankan National Trials in the Sugathadasa Stadium in Colombo. This surpassed the 16.45 M record of Renjith Maheshwary of India at the 2016 South Asian Games. Dananjaya also holds Sri Lankan junior record in the long jump, at 7.83 m. He went to Joseph Vaz College, and represented the Sri Lanka Army Sports Club locally.

In June 2023, Dananjaya disappeared while representing Sri Lanka in an international sporting event held in Geneva, Switzerland. It is one of many disappearances involving Sri Lankan athletes.
