= Enforced disappearances in Sri Lanka =

Tens of thousands of people have disappeared in Sri Lanka since the 1980s. A 1999 study by the United Nations found that Sri Lanka had the second highest number of disappearances in the world and that 12,000 Sri Lankans had disappeared after being detained by the Sri Lankan security forces. A few years earlier the Sri Lankan government had estimated that 17,000 people had disappeared. In 2003 the Red Cross stated that it had received 20,000 complaints of disappearances during the Sri Lankan Civil War of which 9,000 had been resolved but the remaining 11,000 were still being investigated. Amnesty International reported in 2017 that the disappeared persons in Sri Lanka could be between 60,000 and 100,000 since the late 1980s.

Human rights groups such as Amnesty International, Human Rights Watch and Asian Human Rights Commission have documented many of the disappearances and attributed them to the Sri Lankan security forces, pro-government paramilitary groups and Sri Lankan Tamil militant groups.

In 2016, the government under president Maithripala Sirisena agreed to issue a certificate of absence to relatives of over 65,000 that went missing during the civil war and the marxist uprising allowing them to temporarily manage the property and assets of missing people, to obtain provisional guardianship of their children and apply for government welfare schemes. Further the Office on Missing Persons (OMP) a proposal by Prime Minister Ranil Wickremesinghe was created in the same year

In 2020, president Gotabaya Rajapaksa confirmed that the missing people from the civil war are actually dead.

== Background ==
Sri Lanka has a history of disappearances, both during the Sri Lankan Civil War and the 1980s JVP insurrection. Commissions have documented how thousands of people have been kidnapped by armed men and disappeared without a trace. The victims largely belong to the minority Sri Lankan Tamil community and thousands of Sinhalese youths from the Sinhalese community during the JVP insurgency.

== White van abductions ==
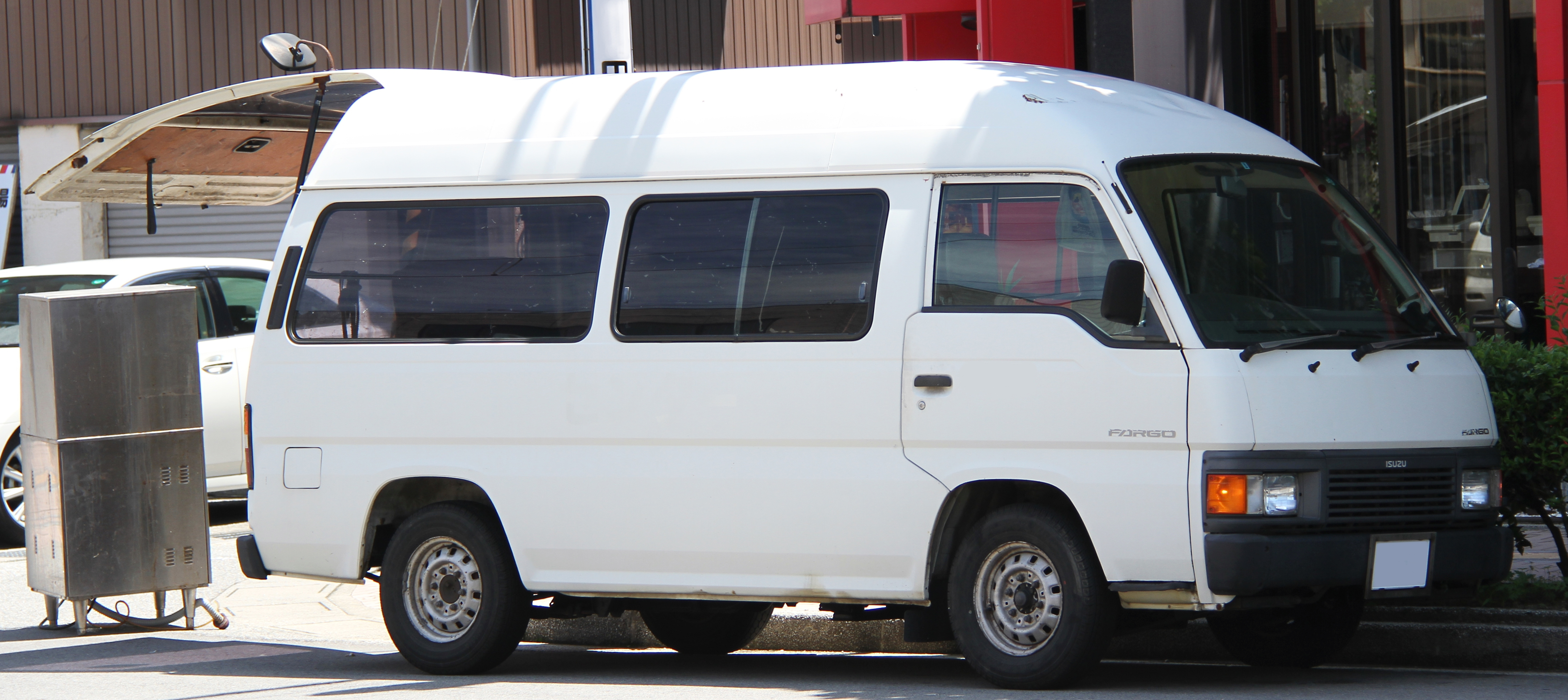
A van which looks similar to the vans used in the Enforced Disappearances.

Many Tamil nationalists claim there was a resurgence of abductions in 2005 after the failure of Norwegian mediated peace process. The victims of the abductions were predominantly Sri Lankan Tamils living in Jaffna and Colombo. A notable feature in the abductions is the use of white vans without number plates. White van abductions were a part of life in Jaffna and the abductions were carried with impunity even during curfew hours in this period.

Several youth were also abducted in Colombo by white vans in 2008. The families of the victims accused the then navy commander and Gotabhaya Rajapaksa of the abductions.

Then president Mahinda Rajapaksa's brother and then defence secretary Gotabhaya Rajapaksa is accused of being the "architect of white van abductions" and is accused of silencing critics and dissidents. However Gotabhaya replied saying that White vans only abduct "criminals"

== See also ==
- Allegations of State terrorism by Sri Lanka
- Human rights in Sri Lanka
- Sri Lankan sporting disappearances
- War crimes in Sri Lanka
