= Driving licence in Sri Lanka =

Driving Licence of Sri Lanka
- Type: Driving licence
- Issued by: Sri Lanka
- Purpose: Identification
- Valid in: Sri Lanka
- Expiration: 8 years

In Sri Lanka, the driving licence is the official document which authorises its holder to operate various types of motor vehicle on public roads. They are administered by the Department of Motor Traffic (DMT). A licence is required to drive on a public road and a minimum age is 18 years for all vehicles.

Candidates have to pass a theory and practical test to obtain driving licence along with a medical clearance. New Smart Card driving licences are available from 2012. These cards are intended for the use in the proposed "point system".

== Classes of driving licence ==
The following classes are printed on the new high security driving licence:

| Class | Description |
|---|---|
| A1 | Light motor cycles of which Engine Capacity does not exceeds 100CC |
| A | Motorcycles of which Engine capacity exceeds 100CC |
| B1 | Motor Tricycle or van of which tare does not exceed 500kg and Gross vehicle weight does not exceed 1000 kg; Motor vehicle in this class include an invalid carriage |
| B | Dual purpose Motor vehicle of which Gross Vehicle Weight does not exceed 3500kg and the seating capacity does not exceed 9 seats inclusive of the driver's seat, which may be combined with a trailer of which maximum authorized tare does not exceed 750kg; Motor vehicle in this class include an invalid carriage and all cars where the seating capacity does not exceed 9 seats inclusive of the Driver's seat |
| C1 | Light Motor Lorry – Motor Lorry of which Gross Vehicle Weight exceeds 3500 kg and does not exceed 17000kg; Motor vehicles in this class may be combined with a trailer having maximum authorized tare which does not exceed 750kg, Motor vehicles of this class include a motor ambulance and motor hearses |
| C | Motor Lorry of which Gross vehicle Weight is more than 17000kg, may be combine with a trailer having a maximum authorized tare which does not exceed 750kg |
| CE | Heavy Motor Lorry – Combination of motor lorry and trailer(s) including articulated vehicles and its trailer(s) of which maximum authorized tare of the trailer exceeds 750kg and gross vehicle weight exceeds 3500kg |
| D1 | Light Motor Coach – Motor vehicles used for the carriage of persons and having seating capacity of not less than 9 seats and not more than 33 seats inclusive of the driver's seat; motor vehicle in this class may be combined with a trailer having a maximum authorized tare which does not exceed 750kg |
| D | Motor Coach where the seating capacity does not exceed 33 seats inclusive of the driver's seat; motor vehicles in this class may be combined with a trailer having a maximum authorized tare which does not exceed 750kg |
| DE | Heavy Motor Coach – Combination of motor coach having a seating capacity of 33 seats inclusive of the driver's seat and its trailer having maximum authorized tare exceeding 750kg or a combination of two motor coaches |
| G1 | Hand Tractors – Two Wheel Tractor with a Trailer |
| G | Land Vehicle – Agricultural Land Vehicle with or without a trailer |
| J | Special purpose Vehicle – Vehicle used for construction, loading & unloading excluding motor lorries, light motor lorries and heavy motor lorries, equipped with construction equipment and equipment for loading and unloading goods |
