= Visa requirements for Sri Lankan citizens =

Administrative entry restrictions

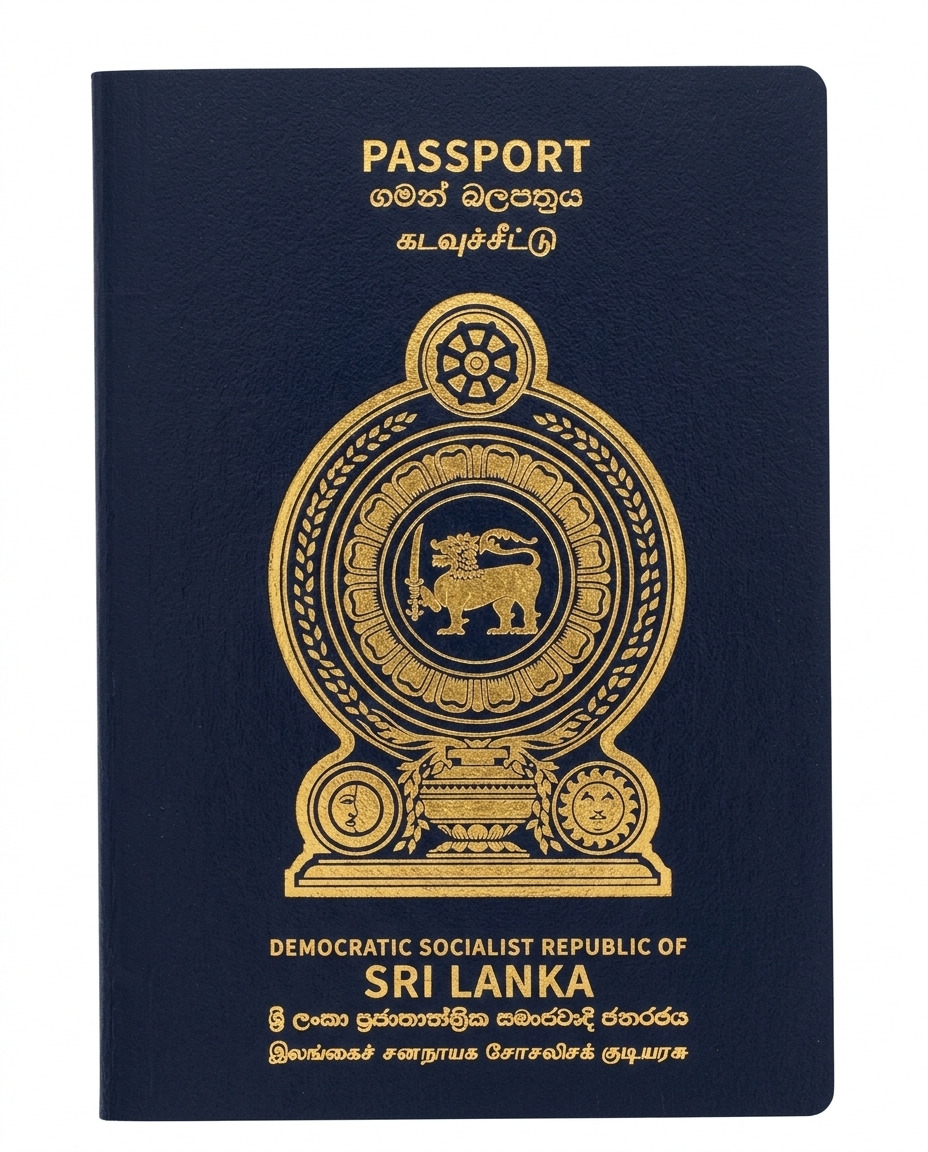
The front cover of a Sri Lankan passport issued since October 21, 2024

Visa requirements for Sri Lankan citizens are administrative entry restrictions by the authorities of other states placed on citizens of Sri Lanka.

As of 2026, Sri Lankan citizens had visa-free or visa on arrival access to 39 countries and territories, ranking the Sri Lankan passport 93rd in the world according to the Henley Passport Index. This has hampered the ability of Sri Lankan business people to travel and connect with peers and maintain a globally competitive outlook.

Although Sri Lanka is an upper middle-income country, successive Sri Lankan governments have made little or no efforts to improve the standing of the passport. The Sri Lankan passport continues to rank in the bottom 10% of Henley's Annual Passport Rankings.

Sri Lanka has limited personal or business contacts with the ASEAN, a region with which it shares significant historical and cultural relations. Within the SAARC region, the Sri Lankan government has made little effort to encourage religious tourism from countries such as Nepal, Bangladesh and Bhutan.

Sri Lanka and Thailand signed a Free Trade Agreement in February 2024, and agreed to enable visa-free travel.

Sri Lankans are unable to travel to Hong Kong, India (e-Visa), China, Indonesia, Bangladesh and the Philippines, six of the world's most important markets, without a complex visa application process with a hefty visa fee.

The inability to access the financial markets of Hong Kong has been especially detrimental to the growth of businesses in Sri Lanka.

Sri Lanka is also one of the very few countries that requires an electronic visa for Malaysia.

It is also one of a handful of countries that requires a visa to transit through major airports in the Schengen Area, UK, Canada, USA, and Colombia.

Despite demands from citizens and civil society groups, Sri Lanka has largely been unsuccessful in expanding visa-free travel for its citizens.

In July 2024, Sri Lanka announced it will issue biometric passports to its citizens in order to address the poor standing of the passport. The process, however, has been delayed due to procurement inconsistencies.

The Sri Lankan state has made statements from time to time that it wishes to enhance links within the Indian Ocean littoral but has largely struggled to convert these statements into reality.

== Visa requirements map ==
Visa requirements for Sri Lankan citizens holding ordinary passports Sri Lanka Visa not required Visa on arrival eVisa Visa available both on arrival or online Visa required

== Visa requirements ==
Country	Visa requirement	Allowed stay	Notes (excluding departure fees)
Afghanistan	eVisa	30 days	e-Visa : Visitors must arrive at Kabul International (KBL).
Albania	eVisa	90 days	Visa-free travel for a maximum stay of 90 days within any 180-day period for valid or previously used visa issued by a Schengen area country, the United States, or the United Kingdom.
Algeria	Visa required		Visitors on tours organized to some southern regions by an approved travel agency may obtain a visa on arrival for up to 30 days.
Andorra	Visa required		Multiple-entry Schengen visa covers entry.
Angola	Visa required		
Antigua and Barbuda	eVisa		
Argentina	Visa required		
Armenia	Visa required		
Australia and territories	Online Visa required		May apply online (Online Visitor e600 visa).
Austria	Visa required		
Azerbaijan	eVisa	30 days	
Bahamas	Visa not required	3 months	
Bahrain	eVisa / Visa on arrival	14 days	Visa on arrival for a maximum stay of 14 days for those who hold a valid residency permit to Gulf Cooperation Council (GCC) countries, who have already stayed for more than 6 months in their country of residence.
Bangladesh	Visa required		
Barbados	Visa not required	6 months	
Belarus	Visa required		
Belgium	Visa required		
Belize	Visa required		Visa on arrival for US or Schengen visa holders.
Benin	eVisa	30 days	Must have an International Vaccination Certificate.; Three types of electronic visa are offered: the e-Visa valid for 30 days for a single entry (50 EUR), the e-Visa valid for 30 days for several (multiple) entries (75 EUR), and the e-Visa valid for 90 days to make several (multiple) entries (100 EUR).
Bhutan	eVisa	90 days	Visa fee is 40 USD per person and visa application may be processed within 5 business days with duration of stay of 90 days.; The Sustainable Development Fee (SDF) of 200 USD per person, per night for almost all visitors to Bhutan. Additionally, if payment is made in US dollars from September 1, 2023 to August 31, 2027, the SDF is 100 USD.
Bolivia	Online Visa	30 days	
Bosnia and Herzegovina	Visa required		Multiple-entry visa (issued by a Schengen country, Bulgaria, Croatia, Cyprus, Ireland, Monaco, Romania, the United Kingdom or the United States) covers entry for a maximum stay of 30 days or until the visa expires. A maximum stay of 90 days within any 180-day period is permitted.
Botswana	eVisa	3 months	
Brazil	Visa required		
Brunei	Visa required		
Bulgaria	Visa required		Multiple-entry Schengen visa covers entry.
Burkina Faso	eVisa		
Burundi	Online Visa / Visa on arrival	1 month	From December 2021, passengers of all countries that required visa, can now obtain a visa on arrival at Bujumbura International Airport and at all land borders.
Cambodia	eVisa / Visa on arrival	30 days	
Cameroon	eVisa		
Canada	Visa required		US permanent residents (Green card) holders can enter visa-free.
Cape Verde	Visa required		
Central African Republic	Visa required		
Chad	eVisa		
Chile	Visa required		
China	Visa required		24-hour visa-free transit through any international airports of China (except Ürümqi), allows domestic travel through different airports. (Note: Custom procedure for 24-hour visa-free transit is required in principle, except in Beijing (both Capital and Daxing), Shanghai Pudong, Hangzhou, Xiamen, Guangzhou, Shenzhen, Chengdu Tianfu and Xi'an if no leaving of international transit areas.)
Colombia	Online Visa		
Comoros	Visa on arrival	45 days	
Republic of the Congo	Visa required		
Democratic Republic of the Congo	eVisa	7 days	
Costa Rica	Restricted visa required		Holders of a valid multiple-entry visa of any member state of the Schengen Area, Canada, or the United States may enter Cost Rica without a visa for maximum stay of 30 days.; Regular passport holders are required to obtain a restricted visa with permission from Costa Rica's internal ministries.
Côte d'Ivoire	eVisa	3 months	e-Visa holders must arrive via Port Bouet Airport.
Croatia	Visa required		Multiple-entry Schengen visa covers entry.
Cuba	eVisa	90 days	
Cyprus	Visa required		
Czech Republic	Visa required		Multiple-entry Schengen visa covers entry.
Denmark	Visa required		Multiple-entry Schengen visa covers entry.
Djibouti	eVisa	90 days	
Dominica	Visa not required	6 months	
Dominican Republic	Visa required		Holders of a valid visa or a residence permit of any member state of the Schengen Area, Canada, Cyprus, Ireland, the United Kingdom or the United States may enter the Dominican Republic without a visa.
Ecuador	eVisa		
Egypt	Visa required		
El Salvador	Visa required		
Equatorial Guinea	eVisa		
Eritrea	Visa required		
Estonia	Visa required		Multiple-entry Schengen visa covers entry.
Eswatini	Visa required		
Ethiopia	eVisa	90 days	e-Visa holders must arrive via Addis Ababa Bole International Airport.
Fiji	Online Visa		
Finland	Visa required		Multiple-entry Schengen visa covers entry.
France	Visa required		Multiple-entry Schengen visa covers entry.
Gabon	eVisa	90 days	e-Visa holders must arrive via Libreville International Airport.
Gambia	Visa not required	90 days	Must obtain an entry clearance from Gambian Immigration prior to arrival.
Georgia	Visa required		e-Visa available for holders of a valid visa or residence permit from a Schengen area country, OECD member country, or a GCC country can travel to Georgia visa-free for a period of 90 days. Visitors obtain an entry visa stamp to Georgia on arrival. The GCC resident permit should be at least six-months old for Georgia visa exemption.
Germany	Visa required		Multiple-entry Schengen visa covers entry.
Ghana	Visa required		
Greece	Visa required		Multiple-entry Schengen visa covers entry.
Grenada	Visa not required	3 months	
Guatemala	Visa required		Visa is not required up to 90 days if holding a valid residence permit issued by Australia, Canada, GCC member state the United States the United Kingdom or a Schengen Area Member State.
Guinea	eVisa	90 days	
Guinea-Bissau	Visa on arrival	90 days	
Guyana	Visa required		
Haiti	Visa not required	90 days	
Honduras	Visa required		
Hungary	Visa required		Multiple-entry Schengen visa covers entry.
Iceland	Visa required		Multiple-entry Schengen visa covers entry.
India	eVisa	30 days	
Indonesia	eVisa	60 days	
Iran	eVisa	30 days	
Iraq	eVisa	30 days	
Ireland	Visa required		Visa is issued free of charge.
Israel	eVisa	90 days	
Italy	Visa required		Multiple-entry Schengen visa covers entry.
Jamaica	Visa required		
Japan	Visa required		Eligible for an e-Visa if residing in one these countries Australia, Brazil, Cambodia, Canada, India, Saudi Arabia, Singapore, South Africa, Taiwan, United Arab Emirates, United Kingdom, United States.; May apply online
Jordan	Visa required		
Kazakhstan	Visa required		Kazakhstan e-Visa; E-Visa can be issued only if there is a valid invitation from the Kazakh side.; To apply for an e-Visa, you need an invitation number received from the inviting Kazakh side.; The issued electronic visa must be printed out for presentation at the state border crossing and on the territory of the Republic of Kazakhstan.; E-Visa gives the right to enter / exit the Republic of Kazakhstan only through the international airports of Astana and Almaty.; E-Visas are not issued to foreigners with whom children travel together.
Kenya	Electronic Travel Authorisation	90 days	Applications can be submitted up to 90 days prior to travel and must be submitted at least 3 days in advance.; eTA fee is 32.50 USD.; Proof of reservation at the hotel where visitors plan to stay is required (if staying with friends, an invitation letter is also acceptable).; Yellow fever vaccination certificate is required if coming from endemic countries.
Kiribati	Visa not required	90 days	90 days within any 12-month period.
North Korea	Visa required		
South Korea	Visa required		Multiple-Entry Visa may be granted to who entered South Korea 4 or more times within the last 2 years, or 10 or more visits in total (one of those 10 visits should be within the last 2 years).; May apply online.
Kuwait	Visa required		GCC residents can apply for e-Visa if they have residency in one of the GCC countries (Saudi Arabia, Bahrain, Qatar, United Arab Emirates, and Oman).
Kyrgyzstan	eVisa	60 days	
Laos	eVisa / Visa on arrival	30 days	
Latvia	Visa required		Multiple-entry Schengen visa covers entry.
Lebanon	Visa required		In addition to a visa, approval should be obtained from the Immigration Department of the General Directorate of General Security (La Surete Generale).
Lesotho	Visa not required	90 days	
Liberia	e-VOA	3 months	
Libya	eVisa		
Liechtenstein	Visa required		
Lithuania	Visa required		Multiple-entry Schengen visa covers entry.
Luxembourg	Visa required		Multiple-entry Schengen visa covers entry.
Madagascar	eVisa / Visa on arrival	90 days	For stays of 61 to 90 days, the visa fee is 59 USD.
Malawi	eVisa / Visa on arrival	30 days	
Malaysia	eVisa	30 days	
Maldives	Visa not required	90 days	
Mali	Visa required		
Malta	Visa required		
Marshall Islands	Visa required		
Mauritania	eVisa	30 days	
Mauritius	Visa on arrival	60 days	
Mexico	Visa required		Holders of a valid visa for Canada, Japan, the United States, the United Kingdom or a Schengen area country may stay for a maximum of 180 days.
Micronesia	Visa not required	30 days	
Moldova	Visa required		Citizens holding a residence permit or a valid visa issued by one of the member states of the European Union or one of the parties to the Schengen Agreement can apply for an electronic visa.
Monaco	Visa required		
Mongolia	Visa required		
Montenegro	Visa required		Multiple-entry Schengen visa covers entry for a maximum of 30 days.; Visa not required for holders of a valid Australia, Japan, Canada, New Zealand, Ireland, US, UK or a Schengen Visa.; Holders of residence permit in the United Arab Emirates may enter, in Montenegro for a duration of 10 days
Morocco	Visa required		May apply for an e-Visa if holding a valid visa or a residency document issued by one of the following countries: Schengen Area, Australia, Canada, Ireland, New Zealand, United Kingdom, United States a residency document issued by Cyprus, Japan, United Arab Emirates.
Mozambique	eVisa	30 days	Upon arrival, the visa will be issued after payment of the fee at the point of entry.
Myanmar	eVisa	28 days	e-Visa holders must arrive via Yangon, Nay Pyi Taw or Mandalay airports or via land border crossings with Thailand (Tachileik, Myawaddy and Kawthaung) or India (Rih Khaw Dar and Tamu).; e-Visa is available for tourism only.
Namibia	eVisa	3 months	
Nauru	Visa required		
Nepal	Online Visa / Visa on arrival	90 days	
Netherlands	Visa required		Multiple-entry Schengen visa covers entry.
New Zealand and territories	Online Visa required		Holders of an Australian Permanent Resident Visa or Resident Return Visa may be granted a New Zealand Resident Visa on arrival permitting indefinite stay (pursuant to the Trans-Tasman Travel Arrangement), subject to meeting character requirements and obtaining Electronic Travel Authorization prior to departure.
Nicaragua	Visa required		
Niger	Visa required		
Nigeria	eVisa	30 days	
North Macedonia	Visa required		Multiple-entry Schengen visa covers entry for a maximum of 15 days and at least five more days than the stay.
Norway	Visa required		Multiple-entry Schengen visa covers entry.
Oman	Visa required		Foreigners residing in GCC countries may obtain a visa on arrival in Oman. Entry visas are issued to residents of any GCC country who arrive directly from any GCC country. Restrictions apply to non-degree related professions (e.g., labourers, carpenters).; Entry visas are also granted to members of the resident's family as long as they enter together.
Pakistan	eVisa	3 months	
Palau	Free visa on arrival	30 days	
Panama	Visa required		
Papua New Guinea	eVisa	60 days	Visitors may apply for a visa online under the "Tourist - Own Itinerary" category.
Paraguay	Visa required		
Peru	Visa required		
Philippines	Visa required		Residents of the United Arab Emirates may obtain an eVisa through the official Philippine eVisa website. A valid Emirati residence visa must be shown upon an eVisa application.
Poland	Visa required		Multiple-entry Schengen visa covers entry.
Portugal	Visa required		Multiple-entry Schengen visa covers entry.
Qatar	eVisa		Visitors may apply for a visa on the Hayya website.
Romania	Visa required		Multiple-entry Schengen visa covers entry.
Russia	Visa required		
Rwanda	Visa not required	30 days	
Saint Kitts and Nevis	Electronic Travel Authorisation	3 months	
Saint Lucia	Visa required		
Saint Vincent and the Grenadines	Visa not required	3 months	
Samoa	Entry permit on arrival	90 days	
San Marino	Visa required		
São Tomé and Príncipe	eVisa		
Saudi Arabia	Visa required		Tourist visa on arrival for holders of a valid multiple entry visa from US, UK or Schengen area, under the condition that the multiple entry visa has been used at least once, proving that by showing the entry and exit stamps of the country of issuance.
Senegal	Visa required		
Serbia	eVisa	90 days	90 days within any 180-day period. Transfers allowed.; Visa-free travel for a maximum stay of 90 days for valid visa holders or residents of the European Union or the United States.
Seychelles	Electronic Border System	3 months	Application can be submitted up to 30 days before travel.; Visitors must upload a reservation confirmation(s) for each visitor's location of stay in Seychelles.; Yellow fever vaccination certificate is required if coming from endemic countries.; Payment of the fee (EUR 10) by credit or debit card.; Valid for one journey only and it expires once exit the country.
Sierra Leone	eVisa / Visa on arrival	30 days	
Singapore	Visa not required	30 days	
Slovakia	Visa required		Multiple-entry Schengen visa covers entry.
Slovenia	Visa required		Multiple-entry Schengen visa covers entry.
Solomon Islands	Visa required		
Somalia	eVisa	30 days	
South Africa	Visa required		
South Sudan	eVisa		Obtainable online.; Printed visa authorization must be presented at the time of travel.
Spain	Visa required		Multiple-entry Schengen visa covers entry.
Sudan	Visa required		
Suriname	eVisa		
Sweden	Visa required		Multiple-entry Schengen visa covers entry.
Switzerland	Visa required		Multiple-entry Schengen visa covers entry.
Syria	eVisa		
Tajikistan	Visa not required	30 days	
Tanzania	eVisa / Visa on arrival	90 days	
Thailand	Visa not required	60 days	
Timor-Leste	Visa on arrival	30 days	
Togo	eVisa	15 days	
Tonga	Visa required		
Trinidad and Tobago	eVisa	90 days	
Tunisia	Visa required		
Turkey	Visa required		May Apply conditional e-Visa. Maximum stay of 30 days for valid visa holders or residents of the European Union or the United States.
Turkmenistan	Visa required		When transiting between two non-bordering countries, visitors can obtain a Turkmenistan transit visa for a five-day stay. This must be applied for in advance at the Turkmenistan Embassy. Visitors must also submit copies of the visas for the country of entry into Turkmenistan and the country of departure from Turkmenistan. Visa fee is 20 USD.
Tuvalu	Visa on arrival	1 month	
Uganda	eVisa	3 months	
Ukraine	Visa required		
United Arab Emirates	Visa required		May apply using 'Smart service'.
United Kingdom	Online Visa required		Online visitor visa launched for visa required nationals since 25 February 2026.
United States and territories	Visa required		
Uruguay	Visa required		
Uzbekistan	eVisa	30 days	5-day visa-free transit at the international airports if holding a confirmed onward ticket for a flight to a third country.
Vanuatu	Visa not required	120 days	
Vatican City	Visa required		Open borders but de facto follows Italian visa policy.
Venezuela	Visa not required	90 days	
Vietnam	eVisa		e-Visa is valid for up to 90 days with single or multiple entries.; Prearranged visa obtained online through travel agencies available at Hanoi, Ho Chi Minh City or Da Nang airports.; Phú Quốc without a visa for up to 30 days.
Yemen	Visa required		Yemen introduced an e-Visa system for visitors who meet certain eligibility requirements (group travel of 10 or more people, business trips, and transit etc.).
Zambia	eVisa	90 days	
Zimbabwe	eVisa	1 month	

== Dependent, Disputed, or Restricted territories ==
Unrecognized or partially recognized countries

Countries	Conditions of access	Notes
Abkhazia	Visa required	Tourists from all countries (except Georgia) can visit Abkhazia for a period not exceeding 24 hours as part of an organized tourist group.
Kosovo	Visa required	Do not need a visa—a holder of a valid biometric residence permit issued by one of the Schengen member states or a valid multi-entry Schengen Visa, a holder of a valid Laissez-Passer issued by United Nations Organizations, NATO, OSCE, Council of Europe or European Union a holder of a valid travel documents issued by EU Member and Schengen States, United States of America, Canada, Australia and Japan based on the 1951 Convention on Refugee Status or the 1954 Convention on the Status of Stateless Persons, as well as holders of valid travel documents for foreigners (maximum 15 days stay).
Northern Cyprus	Visa not required	
Palestine	Visa required	Arrival by sea to Gaza Strip not allowed.
Sahrawi Arab Democratic Republic		Undefined visa regime in the Western Sahara controlled territory.
Somaliland	Visa required	
South Ossetia	Visa required	To enter South Ossetia, visitors must have a multiple-entry visa for Russia and register their stay with the Migration Service of the Ministry of Internal Affairs within 3 days.
Taiwan	Visa required	Sri Lankan citizens are subject to special visa requirements and may only visit Taiwan under specific conditions, including official invitations, business activities, medical treatment, family visits, or participation in approved events.; Those visiting Taiwan on business must be interviewed by a Taiwanese consular officer, and their sponsors must submit a letter of guarantee to the Bureau of Consular Affairs in Taiwan.
Transnistria	Visa not required	Registration required after 24 hours.

Dependent and autonomous territories

Country	Conditions of access	Notes
China
Hong Kong	eVisa	
Macau	Visa required	Visitors must obtain a visa in advance through the Chinese diplomatic mission.
Denmark
Faroe Islands	Visa required	
Greenland	Visa required	
Netherlands
Aruba	Visa required	
Caribbean Netherlands	Visa required	Includes Bonaire, Sint Eustatius and Saba
Curaçao	Visa required	
Sint Maarten	Visa required	
France
French Guiana	Visa required	
French Polynesia	Visa required	
(France) French West Indies	Visa required	Includes overseas departments of Guadeloupe and Martinique and overseas collectivities of Saint Martin and Saint Barthélemy.
Mayotte	Visa required	
New Caledonia	Visa required	
Réunion	Visa required	
Saint Pierre and Miquelon	Visa required	
Wallis and Futuna	Visa required	
New Zealand
Cook Islands	Visa not required	31 days
Niue	Visa not required	30 days
Tokelau	Visa required	
United Kingdom
Anguilla	eVisa	
Ascension Island	eVisa	3 months within any year.
Bermuda	Visa not required	
British Virgin Islands	Visa not required	
Cayman Islands	Visa not required	
Falkland Islands	Visa required	
Gibraltar	Visa required	Visa exemptions for holders of a valid UK multiple-entry visa or EU family residence permit.
Guernsey	Visa not required	
Isle of Man	Visa required	
Jersey	Visa required	
Montserrat	Visa not required	
Saint Helena	eVisa	
South Atlantic and Antarctica
South Georgia and the South Sandwich Islands	Permit required	Pre-arrival permit from the Commissioner required (72 hours/1 month for 110/160 pounds sterling).
Antarctica	Special permits required	Special permits by Ministry of Foreign Affairs required for British Antarctic Territory, French Southern and Antarctic Lands, Argentine Antarctica, (Australia) Australian Antarctic Territory, (Antártica Chilena Province) Chilean Antarctic Territory, (Australia) Heard Island and McDonald Islands, (Norway) Peter I Island, (Norway) Queen Maud Land, (New Zealand) Ross Dependency.

== Passport validity ==
Many countries require passport validity of no less than 6 months and one or two blank pages.

== General limitations on passport use ==
Visitors holding an Israeli passport or any passports showing evidence of travelling to Israel are not allowed to enter some countries due to the Arab League boycott of Israel. Some Arab League countries refuse entry to travelers whose passport shows evidence of entry into Israel or hold an unused Israeli visa.

=== Criminal record ===
Some countries (e.g., Canada and the United States) routinely deny entry to non-citizens who have a criminal record.

=== Blank passport pages ===
Many countries require the passport presented to have a minimum number (generally one or two) blank pages. Endorsement pages, which often appear after the visa pages, are not counted toward the minimum number.

=== Persona Non Grata ===
The government of a country can declare a diplomat persona non grata, banning their entry into that country. In non-diplomatic use, the authorities of a country may also declare a foreigner persona non grata permanently or temporarily, usually because of unlawful activity. Attempts to enter the Gaza Strip by sea may attract a 10-year ban on entering Israel.

== Fingerprinting ==
Several countries including Afghanistan, Argentina, Cambodia, China (applies for ages 14 to 70), Japan, Malaysia, Saudi Arabia, South Korea, Taiwan and the United States demand all passengers to be fingerprinted on arrival.

Additionally, the United Arab Emirates and Qatar conduct iris scanning on arrival and on visitors that need to apply for a UAE visa.

== See also ==
- Visa policy of Sri Lanka
- Sri Lankan sporting disappearances
- Sri Lankan passport
- Foreign relations of Sri Lanka
