= Uberto Pasolini =

Italian film producer and director

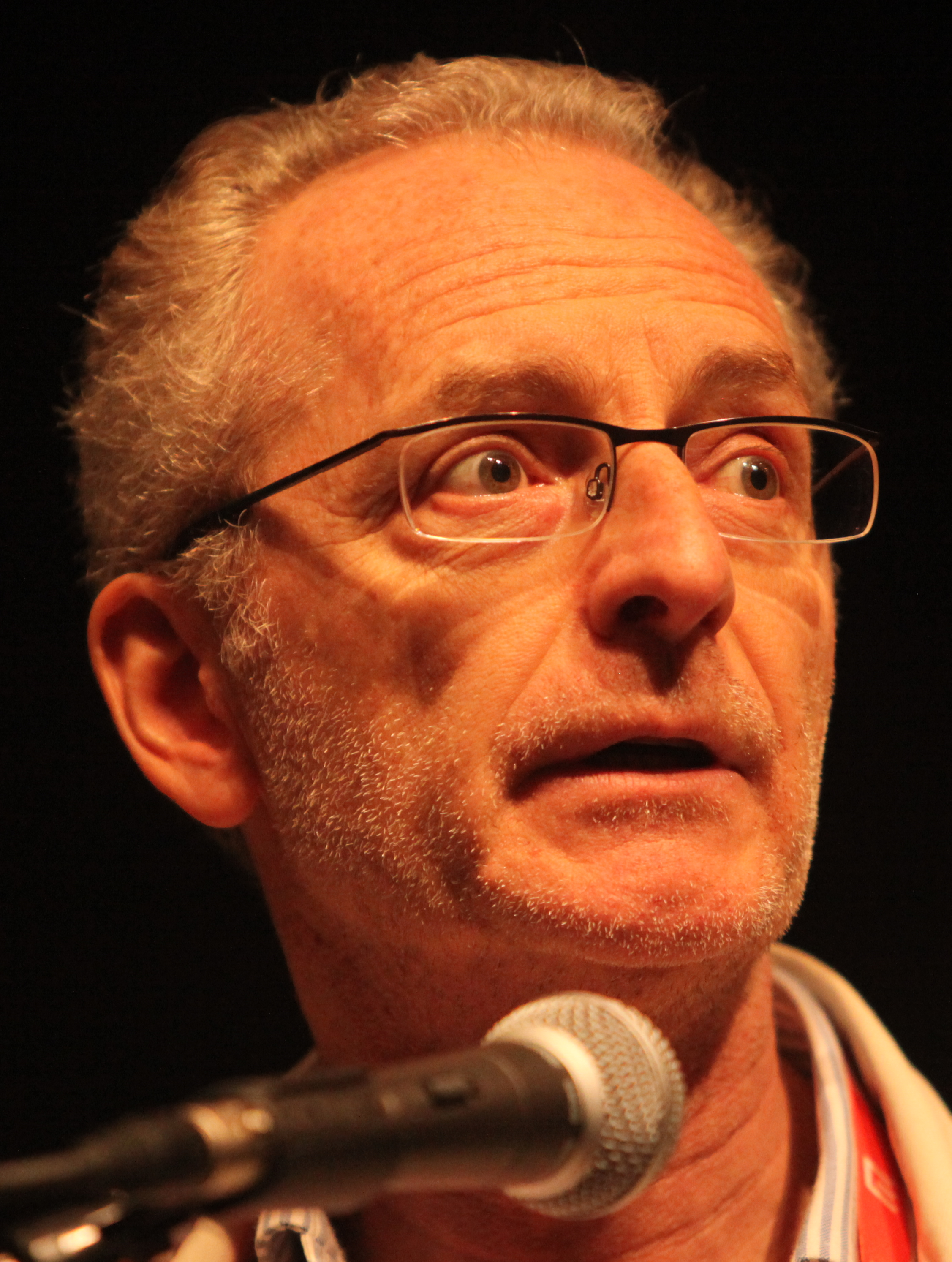
- Pasolini at the Karlovy Vary International Film Festival, July 2014
- Born: 1 May 1957 (age 69); Rome, Italy
- Occupations: Film producer, director, former investment banker
- Known for: The Full Monty (1997); Machan (2008); Still Life (2013)
- Spouse: Rachel Portman (m. 1995; div. 2006)
- Children: 3
- Relatives: Luchino Visconti (granduncle); Eriprando Visconti (first cousin once removed)

Uberto Pasolini Dall'Onda (born 1 May 1957) is an Italian film producer, director, and former investment banker known for producing the 1997 film The Full Monty and for writing, directing and producing the films Machan (2008), Still Life (2013), Nowhere Special (2020) and The Return (2024).

== Early years ==
Pasolini was born in Rome in 1957 to Pier Maria Pasolini dell’Onda and Violante Visconti di Modrone, a member of the Visconti di Modrone family. His parents divorced around the 1970s. His mother then married media publisher Prince Carlo Caracciolo in 1996 until her death in 2000, due to ovarian cancer. He grew up in Milan. He is the grandnephew of filmmaker Luchino Visconti through his mother and the first cousin once removed of Eriprando Visconti.

== Career ==
Pasolini studied at Atlantic College in Wales and at the London School of Economics, and then worked as an investment banker in England for 12 years.

He wished to work on the film The Killing Fields, was interviewed by David Puttnam, and was rejected. When Puttnam went to Bangkok to shoot the film, Pasolini bought his own ticket and presented himself on set seeking work. Puttnam was impressed by this persistence and brought him on board the project. Pasolini subsequently acted as location scout for The Killing Fields (1984), The Frog Prince, and The Mission (1986). He was an assistant director with producer's duties on The Frog Prince (for which he also assisted in translations while shooting in Paris), and The Mission.

Pasolini moved to Los Angeles when Puttnam was appointed as head of Columbia Pictures, and was vice president of production, and in 1988 oversaw production of both David Mamet's Things Change and Emir Kusturica's Time of the Gypsies. Later in 1988, Pasolini returned to London and rejoined Enigma Films to serve as associate producer on Meeting Venus (1991), and as producer on A Dangerous Man: Lawrence After Arabia for an episode of the TV series Great Performances. In 1994, Pasolini left Enigma and founded Redwave Films as a production company to produce the film Palookaville, for which he chose David Epstein to write the screenplay and Alan Taylor to direct.

In 1997, Pasolini received international recognition as producer of the film The Full Monty. He conceived the idea for the film and chose Simon Beaufoy to write the screenplay and Peter Cattaneo to direct. In 2000, Pasolini asked Aileen Ritchie to direct the William Ivory film The Closer You Get, and in 2001 produced The Emperor's New Clothes.

Pasolini's next film was inspired by a real event. In 2004, in order to get visas granting them access to an international handball tournament being held in Bavaria, 23 Sri Lankan men fooled the German embassy in Colombo into believing they were the Sri Lanka National Handball team. The men then travelled to Germany on the pretext of taking part in the sports tournament, but were in fact seeking to emigrate. They postponed their escape and actually took part in several handball matches held by the Asian-German Sports Exchange Program before vanishing. When Pasolini heard of the incident, he decided to make it into a film to promote discussion on the issue of illegal immigration, and in 2008 he released the critically acclaimed Machan, marking his directorial debut.

Following Machan was Pasolini's Redwave Films production, Bel Ami, starring Robert Pattinson, Uma Thurman, Kristin Scott Thomas, and Christina Ricci, which was based upon the novel of the same name by Guy de Maupassant. The film had its world premiere out of competition at the 62nd Berlin International Film Festival in February 2012.

The 2013 film Still Life, starring Eddie Marsan and Joanne Froggatt, is his second film as director.

== Personal life ==
In 1995, Pasolini married the composer Rachel Portman, with whom he has worked on several of his film projects. The two have three children. They divorced in 2006.

== Filmography ==
As producer

- Meeting Venus (1991)
- Great Performances (1 episode, 1992) (TV)
- Palookaville (1995)
- The Full Monty (1997)
- The Closer You Get (2000)
- The Emperor's New Clothes (2001)
- Machan (2008)
- Bel Ami (2011)
- Still Life (2013)

Third assistant director

- The Frog Prince (1986)
- The Mission (1986)

As writer/director

- Machan (2008)
- Still Life (2013)
- Nowhere Special (2020)
- The Return (2024)

== Recognition ==
=== Awards and nominations ===
- 1997, Won European Film Award for Best Film for The Full Monty
- 1998, Won BAFTA Film Award for Best Film for The Full Monty
- 1998, Won Nova Award for Most Promising Producer in Theatrical Motion Pictures for The Full Monty
- 1998, Won ALFS Award for British Producer of the Year for Palookaville and The Full Monty
- 1998, nominated for Academy Award for Best Picture from for The Full Monty
- 1998, nomination for Golden Satellite Award for Best Motion Picture – Comedy or Musical for The Full Monty
- 1998, nominated for Alexander Korda Award for Best British Film for The Full Monty
- 1998, nominated for Australian Film Institute Award Best Foreign Film Award for The Full Monty
- 2008, Won FEDIC Award at Venice Film Festival
- 2008, Won Label Europa Cinemas Award for Best European film at Venice Film Festival for Machan
- 2008, Won Audience Award at Kerala International Film Festival for Machan
- 2008, Nominated for International Jury Award at São Paulo International Film Festival for Machan
- 2009, Won Audience Award for Best Film at Transilvania International Film Festival for Machan
- 2009, Won Best Feature Film at Palm Beach International Film Festival for Machan
- 2009, Won Best Screenplay at Durban International Film Festival for Machan
- 2009, Won Golden Iris for Best Film at Brussels European Film Festival for Machan
- 2009, Won RTBF TV Prize for Best Picture at Brussels European Film Festival for Machan
- 2009, Won Award of the Mayor of the City of Trenčín at Art Film Festival for Machan
- 2010, Won Best Film of the Year at the Sarasaviya Awards for Machan
