= Asian-German Sports Exchange Program =

Non-governmental organisation

Asian-German Sports Exchange Program (AGSEP) is a non-governmental organisation operating in the development sector in Sri Lanka with a partner office in Essen, Germany. AGSEP describes itself as Government Associated Organisation because of its consultancy status to the Sri Lankan Ministry of Disaster Relief Services and the Ministry for Rehabilitation & District Development.

== Profile ==
AGSEP works mainly with internship students from leading German universities doing their undergraduate and postgraduate studies in the fields of economics, political science, social science, engineering, sport and other disciplines. The Asian German Sports Exchange Programme (A.G.S.E.P.)has been conducting sport events and international exchanges between Sri Lankan and European sport teams since 1989. The organisation is based in Marawila, in rural western Sri Lanka, and was founded by the current CEO of the programme, Dr. Dietmar Döring, who at that time was the national coach of the table tennis team. Dr. Döring saw an opportunity to use sport events as an avenue to enhance tourism and the relationships between estranged ethnic communities in Sri Lanka. The philosophy of A.G.S.E.P. is that sport is an ideal way of connecting people and transcending social, cultural, ethnic and religious cleavages. Sport provides a neutral platform for all participants, who are able to experience and learn from each other in a playful and open atmosphere.

AGSEP's mission it to assist the divided ethnic groups of Sri Lanka to find peace by exposing the children of the island to children of other ethnic groups as part of sporting events.

== History ==
The German social education worker Dietmar Doering founded AGSEP while he was a national coach for the table tennis team of Sri Lanka.

Since 1989, against the background of a long-lasting civil war, AGSEP has promoted integrative sport events as peaceful intergroup sport encounters that popularise social values such as intercultural togetherness, respect, courage, commitment, and appreciation through active participation and exchange. Integrative sport events are planned, organised, implemented and staged in co-operation with the three major ethnic groups on the island, Sinhalese, Tamils, and Muslims.

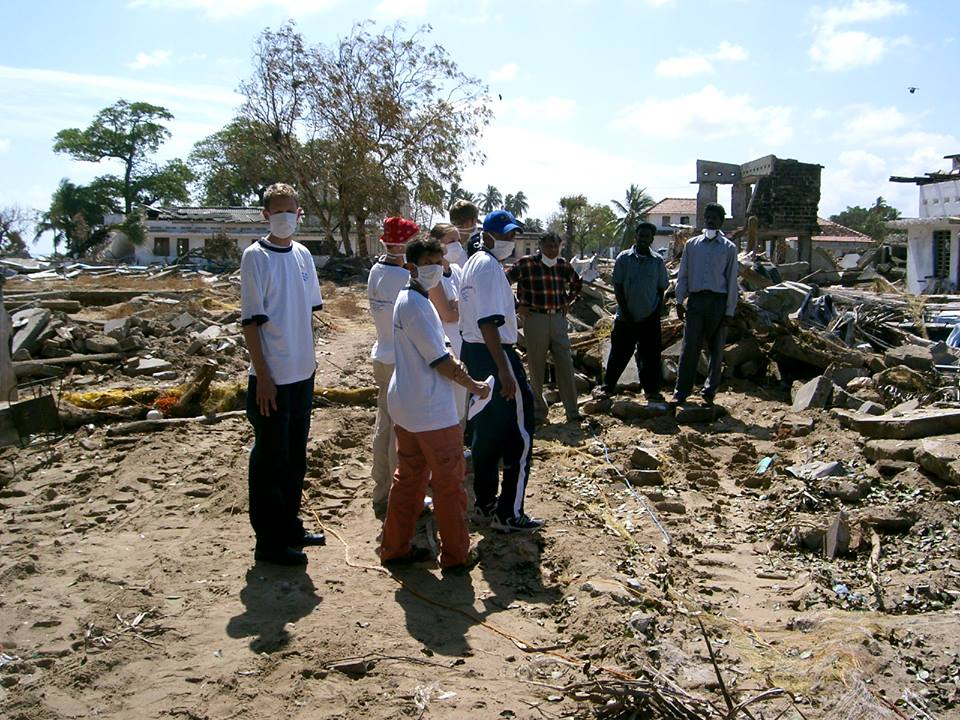
German tsunami relief mission team members of AGSEP visiting tsunami-hit Mullaitivu in Sri Lanka in January, 2005

== Activities ==
=== Tsunami relief mission ===
AGSEP imported more than five million US dollars' worth of medicines directly from Germany and distributed them to areas affected by the 2004 tsunami.

=== International Run for Peace ===
AGSEP organized the International Run for Peace in Sri Lanka in its bid to promote a lasting peace in the war-torn island.

=== International Master Games in Sri Lanka ===
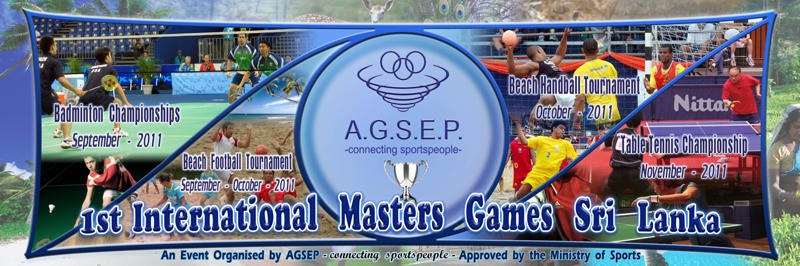
Master Games Sri Lanka

AGSEP organizes International Master Games in Sri Lanka where competitors from a number of countries used to take part.

Players between the ages of 30 and 70 years used to take part in table tennis, badminton, football, handball and beach soccer tournaments which will be played in towns such as Negombo, Kandy, Trincomalee, Galle, Marawila, Puttalam and Hambantota.

Teams from Germany, France, Italy, Norway, Netherlands, Belgium, Luxembourg, England, Austria, Switzerland, Sweden, Scotland, Finland, Denmark, Poland, Russia, Ireland and Asian countries Japan, China, Malaysia, India, Pakistan, Maldives, Taiwan, Sri Lanka, Hong Kong, Singapore, Indonesia, South Korea, Vietnam and Canada will compete in the Masters Games.

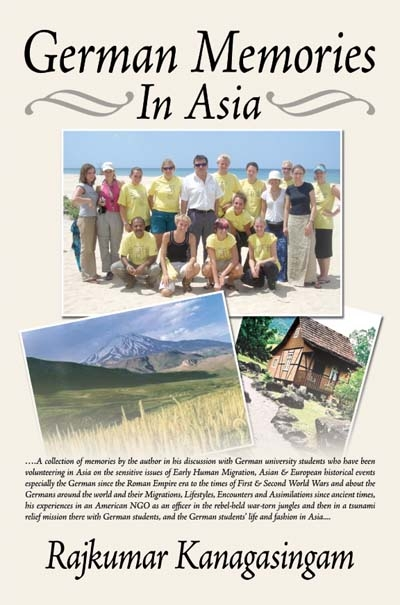
German Memories in Asia, front page

== German Memories in Asia ==
German Memories in Asia is a collection of memories by the author Rajkumar Kanagasingam, in his discussions with the German university students, who have been volunteering in Asia under internship programs; and a collection of facts by the author by further research on the discussed subjects. It narrates Asian and European historical events, especially the German, since the Roman Empire era and about the Germans in Germany, Latin America, North America, East European countries, Australia and elsewhere in the world and their migrations, life styles, encounters and assimilation since ancient times.

The author analyses the Franco-Prussian War and the Otto von Bismarck's diplomacy, Austria & the divided German states, German-Brazilians today, the Pennsylvania's Amish county & the Mennonite communities, the German colonies in Africa, Asia and the Pacific, Volga Germans in Russia under Bolshevist atrocities and the First and Second World War issues of Kaiser William II and his diplomatic chaos, Firebombing on Dresden, Danube Swabians and their expulsion, the U.S. President Gen. Dwight D Eisenhower in the crisis of starving German POWs and more.

The book explores the author's encounters in his early days in the war-ravaged Jaffna in the northern part of Sri Lanka, and then in a tsunami relief mission there with German universities' internship students.

== Movie ==
In 2004, a group of people recorded a fake «Sri Lanka National Handball Team» with the purpose of illegal immigration into Germany, where they lost their games in a tournament and then disappeared. That event is the subject of the movie Machan produced by Uberto Pasolini.
