= Sri Lankan passport =

Passport of Democratic Socialist Republic of Sri Lanka issued to Sri Lankan citizens

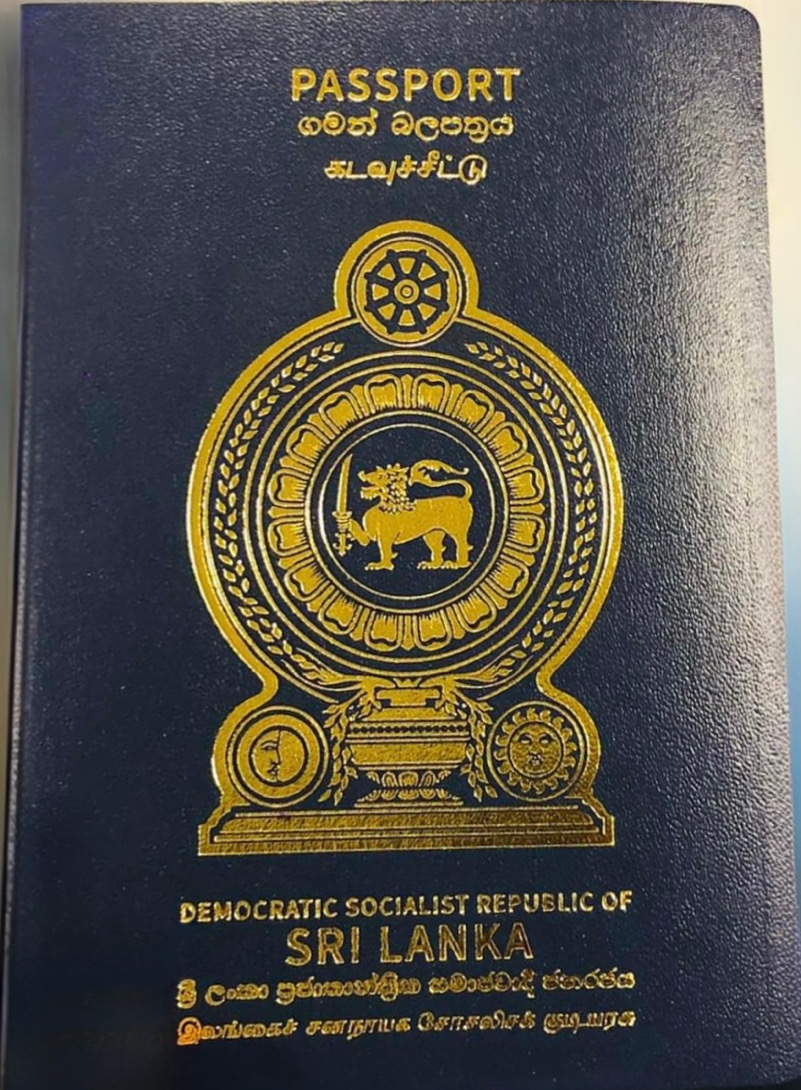
- The front cover of a Sri Lankan passport issued since October 21, 2024
- Type: Passport
- Issued by: (Sri Lanka) Department of Immigration and Emigration
- First issued: 1948 (Dominion of Ceylon passport); 1972 (Sri Lankan passport); 10 August 2015 (Machine Readable Passport); 21 October 2024 (current design)
- Purpose: Identification
- Eligibility: Sri Lankan citizenship
- Expiration: 10 years for adults and 3 years / 10 years for minors (below 16 years of age).

The Sri Lankan passports are travel documents issued to citizens of Sri Lanka for the purpose of international travel. The Department of Immigration and Emigration is responsible for issuing Sri Lankan passports.

== Types ==
- Ordinary Passport (Dark Blue) – Issued for ordinary travel, such as vacations and business trips
- Official Passport (Red) – Issued to individuals representing the Sri Lankan government on official/state business
- Diplomatic Passport (Light Red) – Issued to Sri Lankan diplomats, top ranking government officials and diplomatic couriers.
- Emergency Certificate (Silver)
  - Valid for India and Nepal (for Pilgrimage and medical treatment) (Discontinued from 31 December 2018)
- Non Machine Readable Passports (Brown) – Issued by Sri Lanka Missions under special circumstances

All newly issued passports for adults will have a maximum validity of ten years from the date of issue under the Immigrants and Emigrants Act, regardless of when the previous passport (if any) was issued.

== Data included ==
The Sri Lankan passport includes the following data:

- Photograph of the holder (digital image printed on page)
- Type ('PA' or 'PB' for Ordinary Passport, 'PC' for Official Passport and 'PD' for Diplomatic Passport)
- Country code ('LKA' for Sri Lanka)
- Passport No. (Starting with 'P' for Ordinary Passport, 'OL' for Official Passport and 'D' for Diplomatic Passport)
- Surname
- Other Names
- National Status ('SRI LANKAN')
- Date of Birth (DD/MM/YYYY)
- Sex 'M' for Male and 'F' for Female
- Place of Birth (only the city or town is listed)
- Date of Issue (DD/MM/YYYY)
- Date of Expiry (DD/MM/YYYY)
- Profession
- ID No. (National Identity Card Number)
- Holder's Sign (digital signature printed on page)
- Authority Colombo (digital signature of Controller General of Immigration and Emigration)

The information page ends with the Machine Readable Zone.

== Biometric passport ==
The Controller General of Immigration and Emigration has informed the public that preparations are underway to issue ePassports to Sri Lankan citizens from the end of 2024. He also emphasised that it would improve the Sri Lankan passport's value internationally.

From the 10 August 2015, all newly issued passports are to be enabled with biometric interfaces to allow holders to be applicable for 'Visa Waiver Programmes' (VWP) available in certain countries. The passport is valid like the machine readable PP for 10 yrs. from issuance. The Sri Lankan passport is ranked very poorly in global visa free access lists.

The Sri Lankan government has not issued the e-passport because of procurement inefficiencies.

In 2024, the Department of Immigration and Emigration issuing biometric passports since January 2025.

== Note of passport ==
The passport contains the following note :

Sinhalese:

මෙය දරන්නාට අවහිර බාධාවලින් තොරව නිදහසේ ගමන් කිරීමට සහ අවශ්‍යවන ආධාර ද ආරක්ෂාව ද සලස්වා දෙන ලෙසත් අදාල වගකීම් දරන සියලු දෙනාගෙන්ම ශ්‍රී ලංකා ප්‍රජාතාන්ත්‍රික සමාජවාදී ජනරජයේ ජනාධිපති ඉල්ලුම්කර ද අපේක්ෂාකර ද සිටී.

Tamil:

இதனை வைத்திருப்பவர் தங்குதடையின்றி இலகுவாகப் பிரயாணஞ் செய்ய அனுமதிக்குமாறும் வேண்டிய உதவியையும், பாதுகாப்பையும் அளிக்குமாறும் இது தொடர்புடைய சகலரையும் இலங்கைச் ஜனநாயக சோசலிசக் குடியரசின் ஜனாதிபதி அவர்கள் வேண்டிக் கொள்கிறார்கள்.

English:

The President of the Democratic Socialist Republic of Sri Lanka requests and requires all those whom it may concern to allow the bearer to pass freely without let or hindrance and to afford the bearer such assistance and protection as may be necessary.

== Visa requirements ==
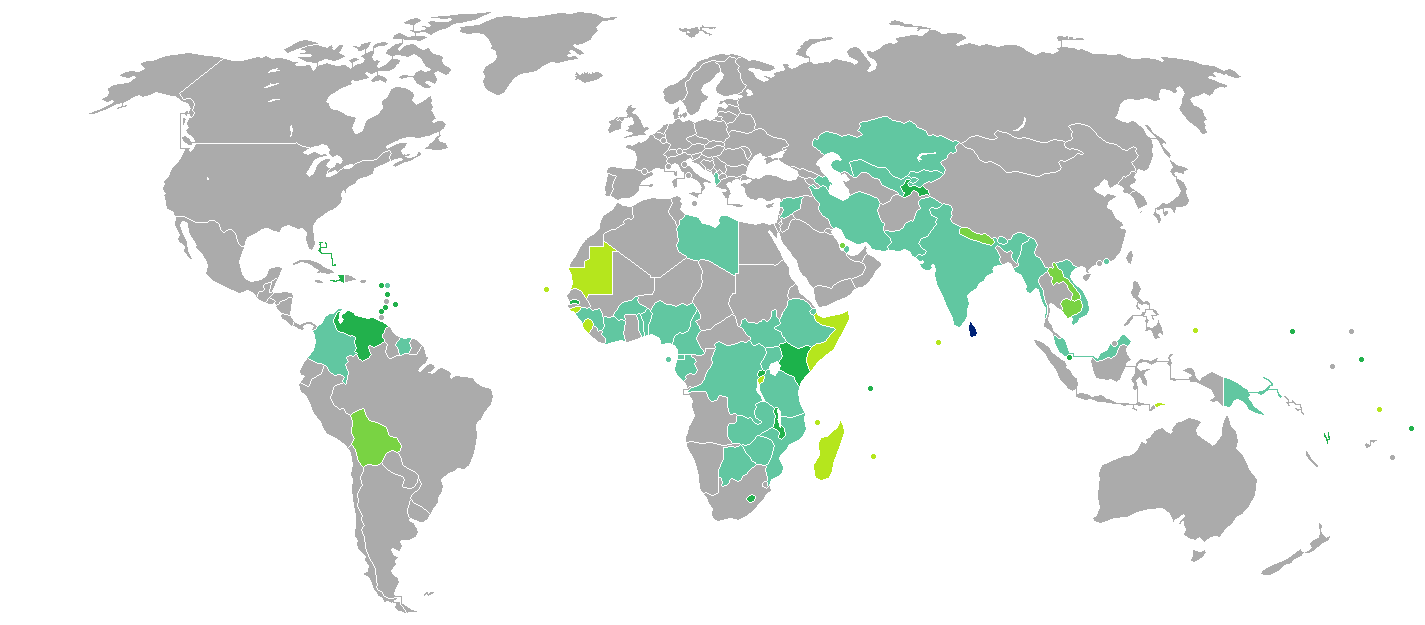
Countries and territories with visa-free entries or visas on arrival for holders of regular Sri Lankan passports

As of 30 May 2019, Sri Lankan citizens had visa-free or visa on arrival access to 43 countries and territories, ranking the Sri Lankan passport 95th in the world in terms of travel freedom (tied with the DR Congo and Kosovan passports) according to the Henley Passport Index. Additionally, Arton Capital's Passport Index currently ranks the Sri Lankan passport 87th in the world in terms of travel freedom, with a visa-free score of 46 (tied with the DR Congo, Nigerian and North Korean passports), as of 7 February 2019.

For an upper middle income country such as Sri Lanka, these rankings are considered to be extremely low. No concerted effort has been made to improve the ranking by the Sri Lankan state. One major implication of the poor ranking has been a brain drain. Successive Sri Lankan governments have disengaged Sri Lanka from its neighbours in South and Southeast Asia by requiring its citizens to obtain visas prior to travel. The sight of long lines outside Commonwealth countries' High Commissions and foreign countries' embassies in Colombo is very common. Likewise, access to major markets such as Hong Kong, Bangladesh, Taiwan, Vietnam and mainland China is also hampered by tedious and complex visa application processes. This has resulted in relatively poor trade and economic integration with ASEAN and SAARC member countries.

Likewise the Sri Lankan state spends millions on maintaining an extensive diplomatic service, which is said to bring little or no benefits to its citizens. Many expatriate Sri Lankans have given up their citizenship due to this. This has led to a significant skills shortage and brain drain.

== See also ==
- Visa requirements for Sri Lankan citizens
