= Galle Literary Festival =

- Begins: January, 2007
- Frequency: Annual
- Location: Galle
- Most recent: January 25 - 28, 2024
- Participants: 90
- Attendance: 5000
- Organiser: Galle Festivals (Guarantee) Limited
- Website: https://galleliteraryfestival.com/

Galle Literary Festival is an international literary festival held annually in the beautiful south coastal fort town of Galle, Sri Lanka. In recent years the profile of the festival has increased substantially, with attendance by many internationally acclaimed and well-known authors and speakers.

In 2024 the title sponsor of the festival was Sri Lanka Tourism Promotion Bureau.

== History ==
The festival was founded in 2007 by Anglo-Australian hotelier Geoffrey Dobbs with an ambition to promote the boutique tourism industry in Sri Lanka as well as to bench mark Sri Lankan authors alongside internationally recognised authors.

There were an operational setbacks in 2013 resulting in a brief hiatus until 2017 and then once again from 2020 - 2023 due to COVID and funding restrictions. 2025 will be the 12th edition of Galle Literary Festival.

The festival is now one of the leading cultural festivals in South Asia has expanded its remit to include an art trail, gourmet programme, comedy, music and entertainment. In 2024 the festival received recognition for its diversity and openness to spotlighting sensitive issues of the day

== Past Speakers ==
Galle Literary Festival has featured many notable international, diaspora and local authors and musicians over the years including Tom Stoppard, Shehan Karunatilaka, Michael Morpurgo, Julian Barnes Richard Dawkins, Jason Kouchak, Simon Sebag Montefiore, David Thompson, Sashi Tharoor, Shyam Selvadurai, Romesh Gunasekera, Dame Maggie Smith, Richard Flanagan, Siddharth Dasgupta, Ashok Ferrey, Ameena Hussein, DBC Pierre and Tishani Doshi.

In 2024 headliners included Mary Beard, Shehan Karunatilaka, Sebastian Faulks, Christina Lamb, Anthony Horowitz and Alexander McCall Smith.

Other past events included: A talk from Dame Maggie Smith Cabaret from Dillie Keane Fashion show by Beatrice von Tresckow Photo exhibition by Chris Dawes Music from Bangladeshi fusion band Chirkutt

== Gourmet Galle ==
Since its inception, Galle Literary Festival has invited international chefs from around the world to host intimate "author dinners". Building on the success of these events, Gourmet Galle was introduced in 2024. The Gourmet Galle programme invites a different international chef every weekend from Jan - March to host a dinner and a masterclass. Events are held at boutique hotels along the coast from Hikkaduwa to Tangalle.

The 2024 chef lineup included James Lowe (Lyle's, London), O Tama Carey (Lanka Food), Jeremy Lee, Cynthia Shanmugalingam (Rambutan restaurant & cookbook), Karan Gokani (Hoppers, London), Mark Hix, Rishi Naleendra (Cloud Kitchen, SG), Paul Flynn (Tannery Restaurant), Mandy Yin (Sambal Shiok) and Peter Kuruvita
