= Abraham Munting =

Dutch botanist and university professor (1626–1683)

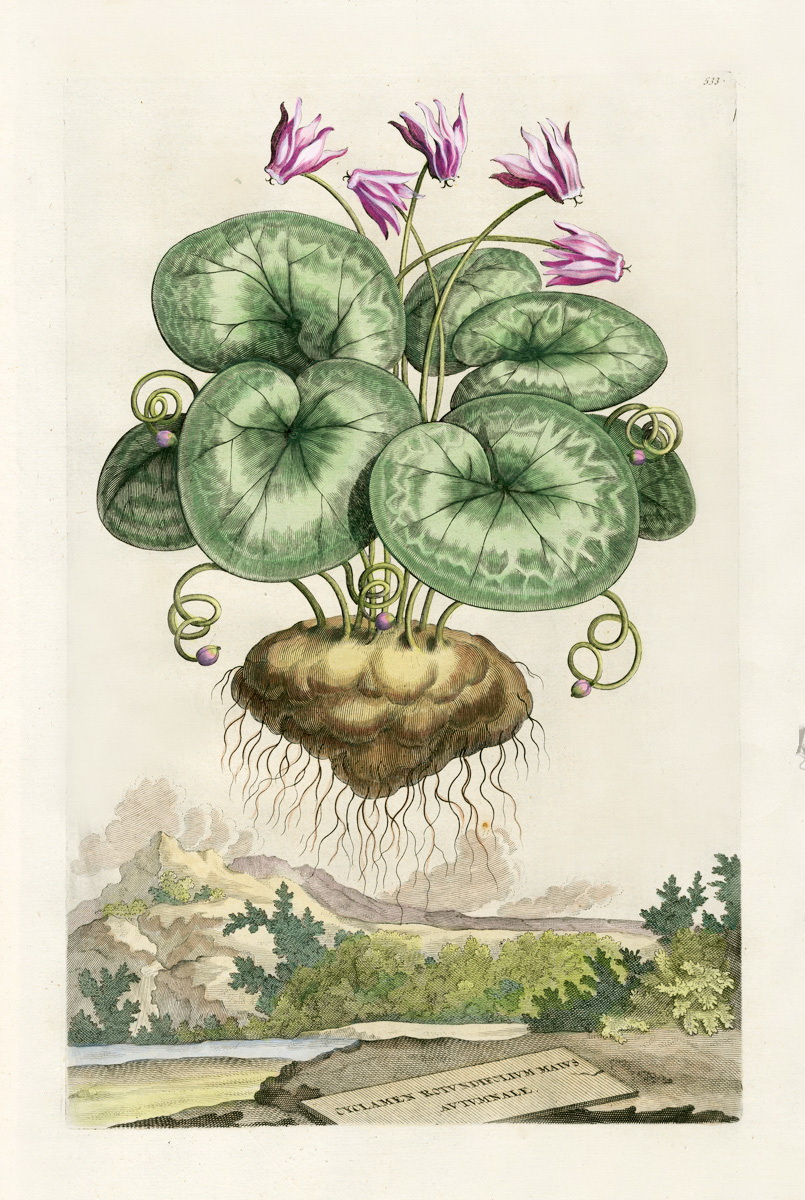
Cyclamen purpurascens Mill. - 'Flore Carneo'

Abraham Munting (19 June 1626 Groningen - 31 January 1683 Groningen) was a Dutch botanist and botanical artist, the son of Henricus Munting (1583-1658).

He studied under his father and at the universities of Franeker, Utrecht and Leiden, also spending two years in France where he obtained an M.D. degree in Angers. Returning to Groningen in 1651, he joined the staff at the Rijkshogeschool Groningen, which eventually became the University of Groningen. Here he taught for 24 years as professor of botany and chemistry. On his father's death he assumed management of the Hortus Botanicus Groninganus, a botanical garden, from 1658 to 1683. His botanist friends sent him seeds from the Dutch East- and West Indies, Africa and the Americas. His daughter, Hester, died after eating Deadly Nightshade from the garden. Munting subsequently developed a particular interest in the medicinal uses of plants.

Munting's best known work Naauwkeurige Beschryving Der Aardgewassen (1696), was published after his death and is an improved version of earlier editions of Waare Oeffening der Planten. The work enjoyed popularity, partly because of its departure from traditional botanical illustration, in that plant species were depicted against a background of classic or pastoral landscapes, often floating in midair with little regard for perspective and relative sizes. Illustrated were trees, shrubs, flowers, and grasses of temperate zones, with some tropical and subtropical plants that had been introduced to the Netherlands. Albrecht von Haller (1708-1777) criticised some of the plates as being of suspicious authenticity. In 1702 the work was translated into Latin by Franz Kiggelaer. After his death in 1683 his son Albert Munting took over the running of Hortus Botanicus Groninganus.

The genus Muntingia (1753) was named by Linnaeus in honour of Munting.

== Works ==
- Waare Oeffening der Planten
- Aloedarium (1680)
- De vera antiquorum herba Britannica (1681)
- Naauwkeurige Beschryving Der Aardgewassen ('Curious/Precise Description of Plants') (1696)
- Phytographia Curiosa (1702)
