= Singapore cherry =

Singapore cherry is a name used for several trees:

- Prunus serotina
- Muntingia calabura
