= Withanachchi =

Withanachchi is a surname. Notable people with the surname include:

- Lalitha Witanachchi, Sri Lankan educator
- Thilakaratne Withanachchi, Sri Lankan politician
