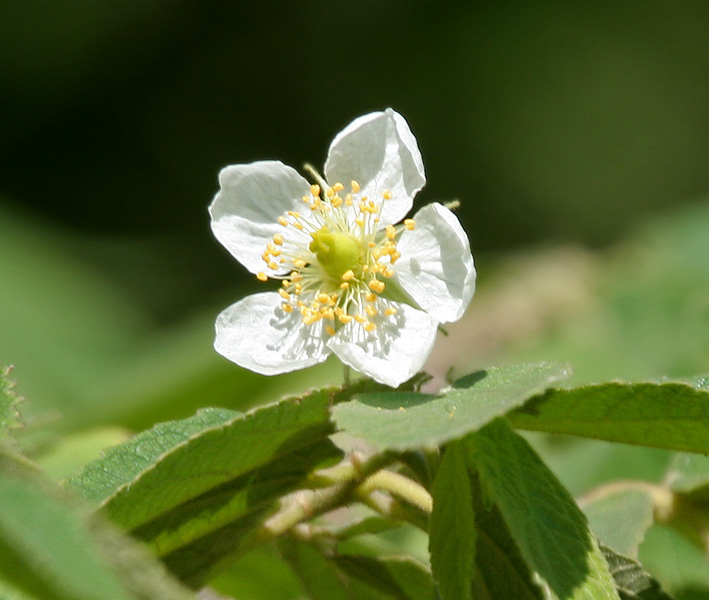
- Muntingia calabura flower

Scientific classification
- Kingdom: Plantae
- Clade: Embryophytes
- Clade: Tracheophytes
- Clade: Angiosperms
- Clade: Eudicots
- Clade: Rosids
- Order: Malvales
- Family: Muntingiaceae
- Genus: Muntingia; L.
- Species: M. calabura

Binomial name
- Muntingia calabura L.

Synonyms
- Muntingia rosea H.Karst.; Muntingia calabura var. trinitensis Griseb.

= Muntingia =

Genus of trees

Muntingia is a genus of plants in the family Muntingiaceae, comprising only one species, Muntingia calabura, named in honour of Abraham Munting. It is native from southern Mexico to Bolivia and Argentina. Its fruit is edible, and it has been widely introduced in other tropical areas.

== Description ==
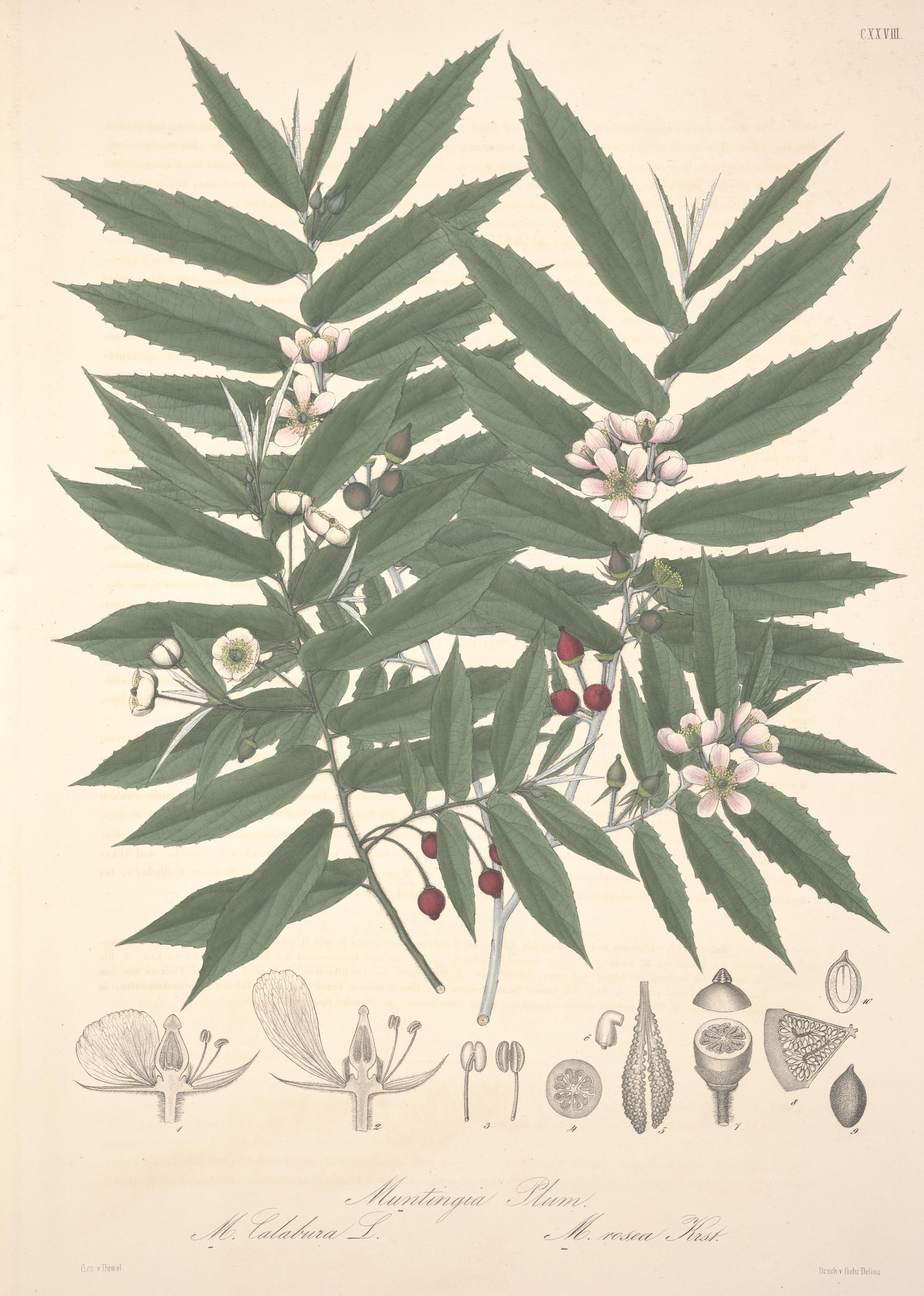
Illustration of M. calabura.

Muntingia calabura is a shrub or tree that quickly grows to between 7.5 and 12 m tall, with spreading branches. The leaves are alternate, distichous, oblong or lanceolate, 4–15 cm long and 1–6 cm wide, with toothed margin and covered in short hairs.

The flowers are small (up to 3 cm wide), solitary or in inflorescences of two or three flowers, with five lanceolate sepals, hairy, five obovate white petals, many stamens with yellow anthers, and a smooth ovoid ovary. The flowers last only one day, their petals drop in the afternoon.

Its fruit is an edible berry about 1.5 cm in diameter and with smooth, thin skin; they are green when unripe, turning red when mature. Its pulp is light-brown and juicy, with very fine seeds; the pulp tastes like fig.

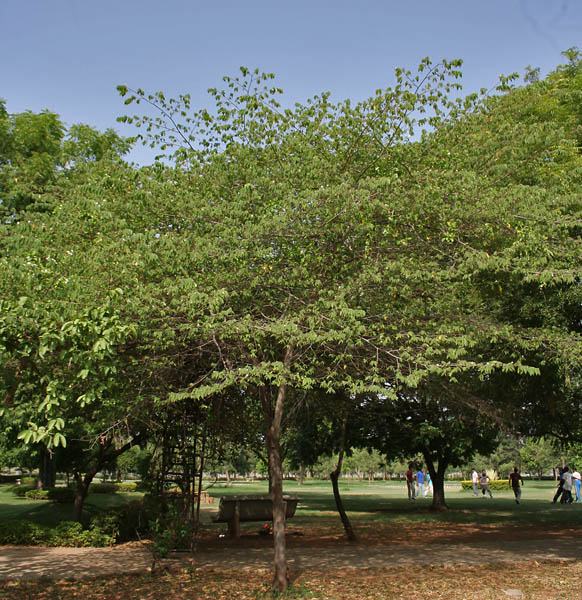
A tree in Hyderabad, India

== Distribution and habitat ==
M. calabura is native to southern Mexico, the Caribbean, Central America, and western South America south to Bolivia and Argentina. It is present in tropical climate in disturbed lowland areas from sea level to 1000 m of elevation. In South India, it is seen in areas adjacent to the Western Ghats.

== Ecology ==
This species colonizes disturbed habitats in tropical lowland areas, becoming part of the secondary vegetation, as well as gallery forests. It thrives in poor soil, able to tolerate acidic and alkaline conditions and drought, but doesn't grow in saline conditions.

The seeds are dispersed by birds and fruit bats.

Although native to tropical America, M. calabura has been introduced in Southeast Asia and naturalized there and in other tropical parts of the world.

== Vernacular names ==
Common names include:

- English: cotton candy berry, calabur tree, capulin, festival berry, Jamaica cherry, Panama berry, strawberry tree, ornamental cherry, jamfruit tree, Singapore cherry, West Indian cherry
- Swahili: Mti kivuli, mharadhali (which actually means mustard, because of its tiny seeds)
- Filipino: aratilis
- Cebuano: mansanitas
- Hiligaynon: ceresa, sarisa
- Divehi: ޖޭމު, jamu (Maldives)
- Spanish: cereza, memiso, nigua, bolaina, capulin blanco; chitato, pasito (Colombia), yumanaza, cerezo caspi (Peru) frutilla, niguito (Ecuador)
- French: bois ramier, cerisier de Panama
- Portuguese: calbura, pao de seda; calabura, curumi, pau de seda (Brazil)
- Swedish: panamabär
- Tamil: sarkarai pala maram, seeni pala maram, nei pazham, then pazham
- Sinhala: jam gaha' (jamfruit tree)
- Kapampangan: sarésa, arátilis
- Kannada: gasagase hannina mara
- India (language not specified): kattilanthi (wild cherry); Company Pazham (Palakkad Walayar area)
- Iloko: seresa, zanitas
- Tagalog: aratiles, datiles, ratiles, latires
- Indonesian: cerri, kersen, talok
- Malay: kerekup Siam, buah ceri
- Khmer: krakhob barang
- Thai: takhop farang (ตะขบฝรั่ง)
- Vietnamese: trứng cá (fish roe fruit)
- Malayalam: panjasaara pazham

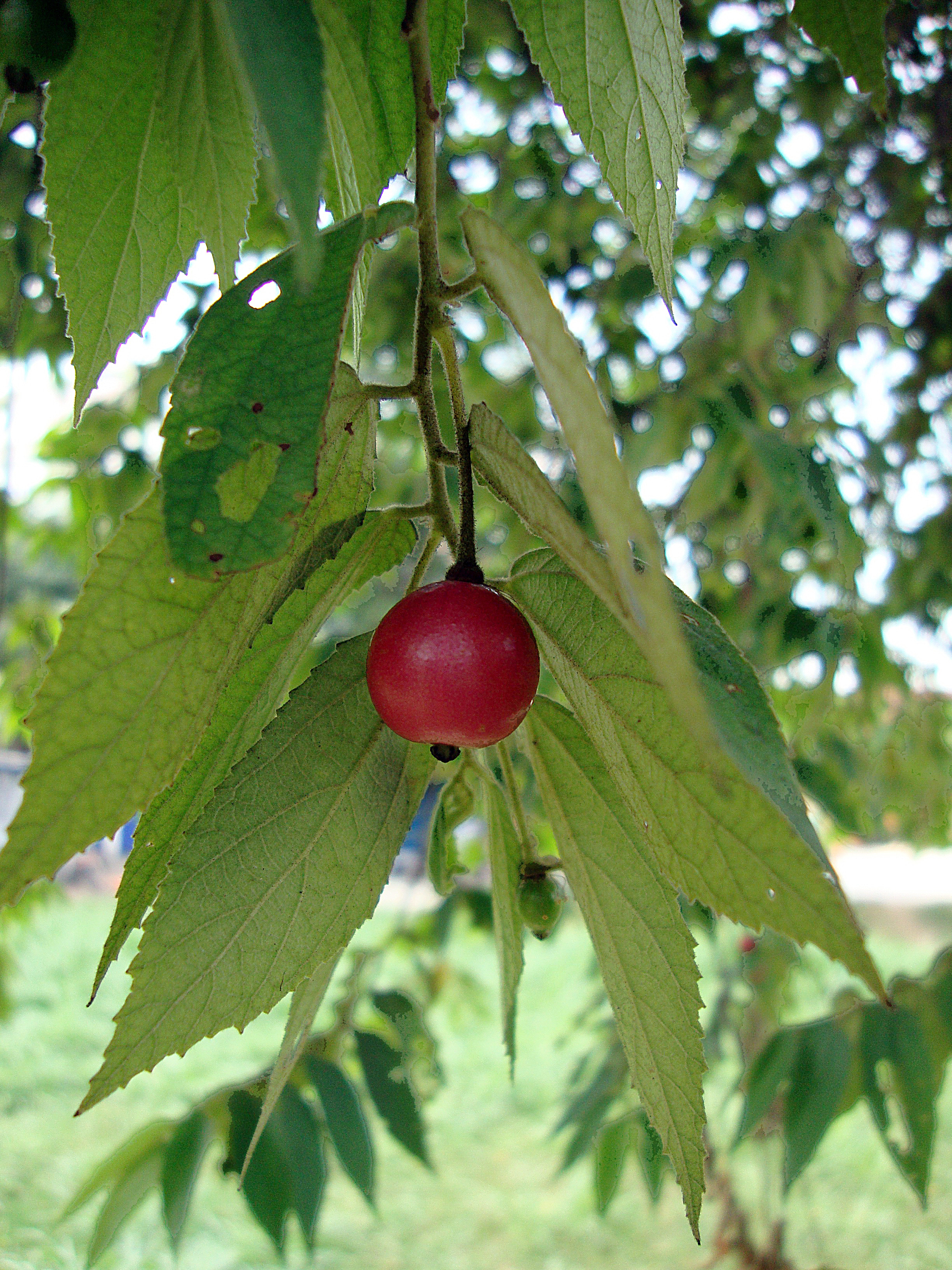
Leaves and fruit

== Uses ==
M. calabura is planted as a source of timber and fuel. Its soft wood is used for rural construction, while the bark is fibrous and used for making ropes.

The fruits are edible and in some cases sold in markets, as they can be eaten raw or processed as jam; leaves can be used for making tea. Also, traditional medicinal uses have been reported for the leaves (treating headaches, prostate problems, and gastric ulcers), bark (antiseptic), flowers (antiseptic, reducing swelling, antispasmodic), and fruits (respiratory problems; antidiarrheic).

It is said to help diabetic patients. A small reduction was recorded in patients' blood sugar levels after consumption.

It is planted as an ornamental species, for shade, and also because the flowers are a source of nectar and pollen for the beekeeping industry.

The tree is also planted along river banks in Brazil, as fallen fruits attract fish.

M. calabura has a potential as a useful species for restoration of disturbed areas and stopping soil erosion. It also offers shelter for wildlife, as it is a source of food for about 60 species of birds and mammals.

== Cultivation ==
M. calabura can be propagated from seeds, seedlings, or cuttings. In Costa Rica, seeds set in the wet season, but require conditions of light and temperature found in forest gaps. In a test in which seeds were placed in wet paper towel at 25 °C in different lighting conditions, 44% of seeds germinated under white light, while none germinated in the dark.

== Cultural references ==
Sri Lankan author Carl Muller chose this tree as the title for his first novel, The Jam Fruit Tree. In the novel, the tree represents the Burgher community of Sri Lanka, "a race of fun-loving, hardy people, much like the jam fruit tree which simply refuses to be contained or destroyed". The book won the Gratiaen Prize for the best published work in the English language in 1993.
