= H. A. I. Goonetileke Prize =

Literary translation prize in Sri Lanka

H.A.I. Goonetileke Prize for Literary Translation
- Type: Literary translation
- Awarded for: The best literary translation of Sinhala or Tamil language creative writing into English.
- Description: Established to promote Sri Lankan writing in local languages to an international audience and foster cross-cultural understanding. Named in honour of H.A.I. Goonetileke.
- Sponsored by: Gratiaen Trust
- Date: Bi-annual
- Country: Sri Lanka
- Presented by: Gratiaen Trust
- Eligibility: Sri Lankan authors resident in the country.
- Reward: Rs 200,000 (as of 2019)
- Status: Active
- Established: 2003
- Website: www.gratiaen.com

The H.A.I. Goonetileke Prize for Literary Translation is a bi-annual literary prize in Sri Lanka. It is awarded by the Gratiaen Trust, which also awards the Gratiaen Prize, for the translation of Sinhala or Tamil language creative writing into English. It was established in 2003.

Michael Ondaatje, who initiated the Gratiaen Prize, had also wanted to promote Sri Lankan writing in the local languages to an international audience. He had also hoped it would foster cross-cultural understanding amongst the various ethnic groups within the country.

The prize is named after his friend Henry Alfred Ian Goonetileke, the first chairperson of the Gratiaen Prize, former Director of the University of Peradeniya library, and bibliographer.

The award is open to Sri Lankan authors who are resident in the country. In 2019, the monetary award was Rs 200,000.

== Winners ==
Year	Translator	Original Work	Genre	Judges
2023 - 2024	Priyangwada Perera	Wid Keirdo (from Sinhala)	Novel	Dr. Krishantha Fedricks (chair); Shash; Dileepa
2021 - 2022	Manel Eriyagama	Jewels: An English Translation of Selected Sinhala Short Stories by Contemporary Writers	Short stories	Dr. Prabha Manuratne (chair); Kaushalya Kumarasinghe; Dr. Ponni Arasu
2019 - 2020	Malinda Seneviratne	The Indelible (Senkottan) by Mahinda Prasad Masimbula	Prose-Poetry	Rohana Seneviratne; Sivasegaram; Kaushalya Fernando
2017 - 2018	Vini Vitharana	Kav Silumina by Parākramabāhu II, King of Ceylon	Poetry	Prof. Sumathy Sivamohan; Prof. Saumya Liyanage; Charulatha Thewarathanthri; Esther Surenthiraraj
2015 - 2016	Aditha Dissanayake	Golden Casket (Ran Karanduwa) by Batuwangala Rahula Thero	Novel	Emeritus Prof. K.N.O. Dharmadasa (chair); Dr. Kumudu Kusum Kumara; Madhubashini Dissanayake–Ratnayake
2013 - 2014	Vijitha Fernando	Time Rebounds (Kala Sarpa) by Keerthi Welisarage	Novel	Dr. Sunil Wijesiriwardena; Prof. Kusuma Karunaratne; Krishantha Fedricks
2010 - 2011	Malinda Seneviratne	The Hunter In the Wilderness of Sansara (Sansaaraaranyaye Dadayakkaraya) by Simon Nayagaththegama	Novel	Ariyawansa Ranaweera (chair); Sandagomi Coperahewa; Shravika Damunupola Amarasekara
2007 - 2008	Edmund Jayasuriya	Sedona by Eva Ranaweera		
2006	Kumari Goonesekere	The Hour When the Moon Weeps by Liyanage Amarakeerthi	Short Stories	
2005	Vijita Fernando	The Chameleon (Nandithaya) by Sunethra Rajakarunanayake	Novel	
