= H. A. I. Goonetileke =

Sri Lankan academic (1922–2003)

- Born: Henry Alfred Ian Goonetilleke; 5 January 1922; Galle
- Died: 21 May 2003 (aged 81)
- Education: S. Thomas' College; Richmond College, Galle; Ceylon University College
- Occupations: Scholar, Academic, Librarian

Henry Alfred Ian Goonetilleke (known as H. A. I. Goonetileke) was a director of the University of Peradeniya library, the first chairman of the Gratiaen Trust and an eminent scholar in Sri Lanka.

== Early life ==
Ian Goonetilleke was born on 5 January 1922. His early life suffered from some misfortune due to the early death of his father in 1926. He was briefly at St. Thomas' College, Mount Lavinia, as a student and then moved to Richmond College, Galle, where he excelled both at academics and sports. He graduated from the Ceylon University College in the early 1940s.

== Career ==
In 1953, Ian Goonetilleke joined the University of Ceylon, Peradeniya, as an Assistant Librarian. He secured a Postgraduate Diploma in Librarianship in 1958 winning the John Duncan Cowley Prize for the best thesis in the process. He received his FLA in 1966 obtaining a distinction for his dissertation entitled A Bibliography of Ceylon - A Systematic Guide to the Literature on the land, people, history and culture published in Western languages from the 16th Century to the present day. It formed the first two volumes of his monumental - A Bibliography of Ceylon in eight volumes. In 1971, he was appointed as the librarian of the University of Peradeniya library. He created history by holding three different designations in the same university as,

- Librarian of University of Ceylon (1971 to 1972)
- Librarian of Peradeniya Campus, University of Sri Lanka (1972 to 1978)
- Librarian University of Peradeniya through (1978 to 1979)

In 1982, he joined the re-building process of the destroyed National Library of Jaffna.

== Later life and education ==
On 5 January 1997, on his 75th birthday, he formally donated his priceless 60-year collection of books, journals, pamphlets, off prints and other documents of an academic nature, paintings and other art objects such as statues in metal and wood as well as some replicas in plaster to the University of Peradeniya library. In addition, in that bequest was also his very valuable collection of personal letters. He died on 21 May 2003 at the age of 81.

== H. A. I. Goonetileke Prize ==
The Gratiaen Trust awards the H. A. I. Goonetileke Prize, named after him, for translations into English of literary works originally written in Sinhala or Tamil.

== See also ==
- University of Peradeniya library
