= Neotessmannia =

Scientific classification
- Kingdom: Plantae
- Clade: Tracheophytes
- Clade: Angiosperms
- Clade: Eudicots
- Clade: Rosids
- Order: Malvales
- Family: Muntingiaceae
- Genus: Neotessmannia; Burret
- Species: N. uniflora

Binomial name
- Neotessmannia uniflora Burret

Genus of trees

Neotessmannia is a genus of trees in the family Muntingiaceae, comprising only one species, Neotessmannia uniflora. It is native to Peru.
