= Sakuntala Sachithanandan =

Sri Lankan author, poet and lawyer

- Occupations: author, poet, lawyer
- Spouse: Thirukeswaram Sachithanandan
- Writing career
- Notable awards: Gratiaen Prize (2010)

Sakuntala Sachithanandan is a Sri Lankan poet, lawyer and storyteller. Her literary work often focused on themes such as poverty, social inequalities, animals, children and exploitation of labourers.

== Biography ==
She is also involved in gardening at her house in Wattala. She was married to Thirukeswaram Sachithanandan who was also a professional lawyer. She is also known to be an animal lover and she had to convince her husband to share their home with six dogs and sixteen cats. She revealed that she was an ardent fan of prominent writers such as John Steinbeck and Anton Chekhov.

== Career ==
She initially pursued her career in the field of law and took oaths as a practicing lawyer in 1972. After practicing as a lawyer for duration of three years, she reportedly quit law and ventured into poetry and storytelling. She spent a brief stint working as a Labour Relations Officer at the Janatha Estates Development Board in Hatton at a time when she was also the mother of a toddler. She was taken by surprise and shock after witnessing social stratification and social disparities in estates during her tenure as the Labour Relations Officer at Janatha Estates Development Board. She eventually compiled a poem collection titled Thalaivar at a Labour Conference in 1978 based on the real life experiences she gained while watching the plight of social disparities at estate levels.

She was well known in social circles as an author of children's stories. She was adjudged as the winner of Gratiaen Prize for the year 2010 in recognition for her literary work titled On the Streets and Other Revelations which was a collection of 28 poems. On the Streets and Other Revelations was applauded by the panel of judges for its engagement with most pressing social issues including the plight of street children and also for its theme emphasizing on key values such as fair-play and justice. It was revealed that Sakuntala wrote a series of poems over a period of four decades and she published them in a book giving rise to On the Streets and Other Revelations by collaborating with Godage International Publishers.

She authored children based story titled Tales from the Treehouse which also became popular among children in Sri Lanka. She also published another children oriented story series titled The Adventures of Sokadi: The Line Room Mouse which also received rave reviews from critics. She wrote and published poems including All is Burning which was based on the plight of a labourer who contemplated about committing a suicide and The True Tale of the Stolen Potatoes which was about a poor man and his family.

In April 2015, she launched book titled Sedahamy, Selvakumari and Others which is a collection of sixty-three poems and she recounts her personal experiences which she witnessed between 2004 and 2014 while compiling the book. Sedahamy, Selvakumari and Others shreds light on important issues with regards to the poverty levels of women who have been suppressed in the society.

In 2022, she published a story titled Way to Go, Rover based on the tale of a stray dog which survived against all odds in the society.
