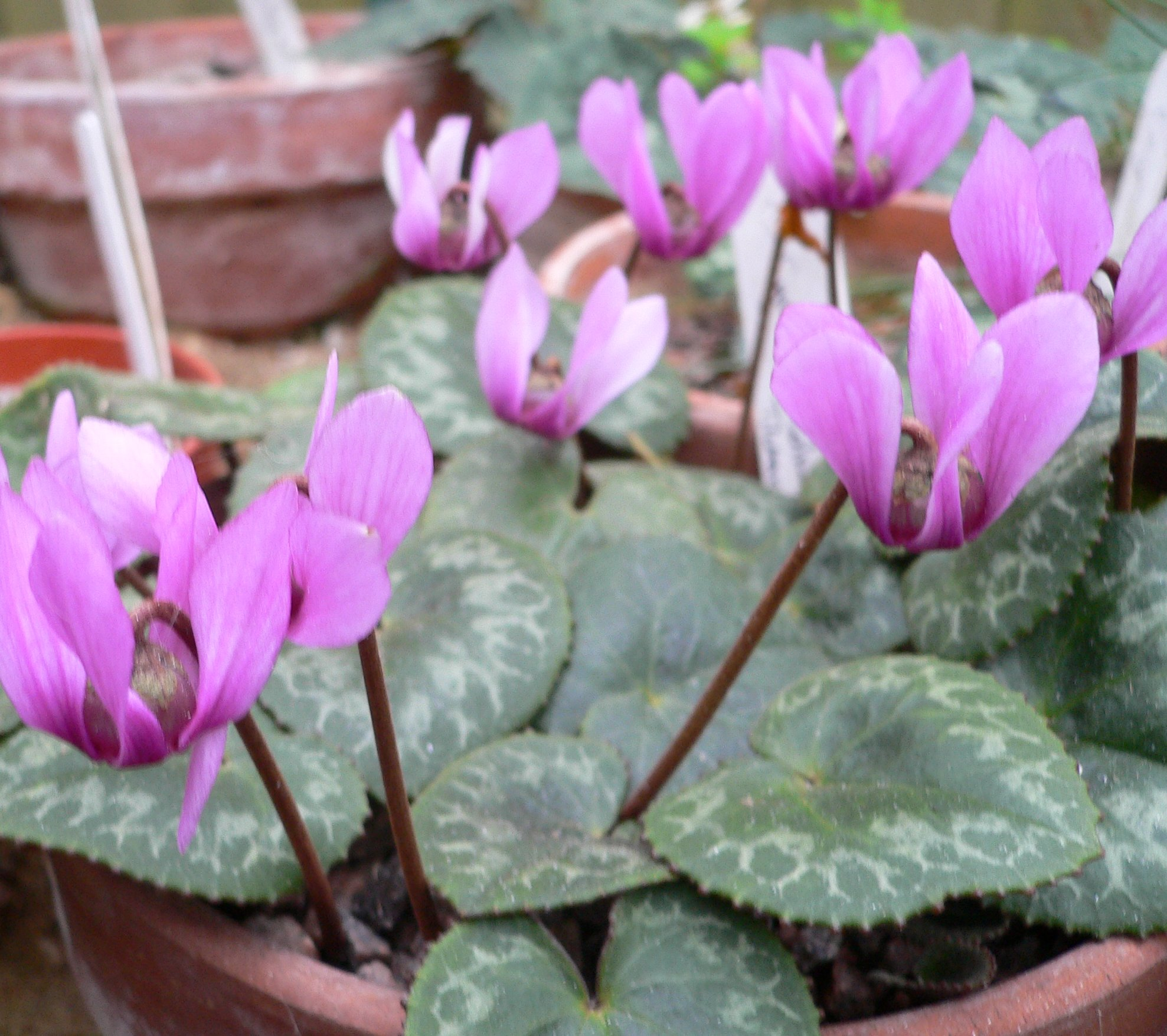

Scientific classification
- Kingdom: Plantae
- Clade: Tracheophytes
- Clade: Angiosperms
- Clade: Eudicots
- Clade: Asterids
- Order: Ericales
- Family: Primulaceae
- Genus: Cyclamen
- Subgenus: C. subg. Cyclamen
- Species: C. colchicum

Binomial name
- Cyclamen colchicum Albov

Synonyms
- Cyclamen purpurascens subsp. ponticum (Albov) Grey-Wilson

= Cyclamen colchicum =

Species of flowering plant in the primrose family

Cyclamen colchicum is a perennial growing from a tuber, native to densely shaded areas among rocks or tree roots in woodland on limestone at 300–800 m (980–2,620 ft) elevation in the autonomous republic of Adjara in Georgia, about 1,900 km (1,200 mi) from the range of the closely related species Cyclamen purpurascens. Unlike C. purpurascens, leaves are very thick and leathery with finely toothed edges.
