= Manel Eriyagama =

Sri Lankan author and translator

Manel Eriyagama is a Sri Lankan academic, translator and author. In 2023, she won the H. A. I. Goonetileke Prize for her translation work titled Jewels, which is a compilation of 14 Sinhala short stories by contemporary writers.

== Biography ==
She pursued her primary education at Mahamaya Vidyalaya. She also attended Ampitiya Convent for a brief stint. She was inspired by the works of Charles Dickens, such as Nicholas Nickleby and Little Dorrit, during her childhood.

She is also involved in gardening. Her husband is a teacher who also served as the Director of Administration at the Royal Institute for a brief period. Her daughter works as a consultant dermatologist, while her son works as a supply chain manager in Australia.

== Career ==
She also served as an instructor at the English Language Teaching Unit. She has insisted that her 37-year experience as an instructor at the English Language Teaching Unit did not turn out to be productive, and she also found spare time to focus on translating only after her retirement from the English Language Teaching Unit.

She began her higher education at the University of Peradeniya. She translated a collection of Sinhala short stories authored by her mentor Piyaseelie Wijemanne. The English translation of Piyaseelie's short story collection eventually won the acclaimed State Literary Award in the translation category.

Piyaseelie Wijemanne also encouraged Manel Eriyagama to engage in translation of other prominent writers original works. She also began translating Liyanage Amarakeerthi's collection titled Duwana Wattiya Saha Sinasena Tikira. She has also published four novels catering to the teenagers.

She compiled and published an English translation titled Jewels in collaboration with Sarasavi Bookshop by selecting 14 Sinhala short stories written by different authors, and the stories covered most of the subject matters relating to the context of Sri Lankan society, including the hierarchy, stereotypes, mental health, poverty, family relationships, romance, and traditions.
