= Crossmatch (novel) =

2020 novel by Carmel Miranda

- Author: Carmel Miranda
- Language: English
- Genre: Medical fiction, mystery
- Publisher: Katha Publishers
- Publication date: December 25, 2020
- Media type: Print (Paperback)
- Pages: 264
- Awards: Gratiaen Prize; State Literary Award for Best English Novel; Dublin Literary Award Longlist
- ISBN: 979-8759613114

Crossmatch is a debut novel by Sri Lankan writer, novelist and doctor Carmel Miranda. The novel received praise and critical acclaim, for which it received the Gratiaen Prize in 2020. Crossmatch also won the State Literary Award for Best English Novel for year 2021.

She was inspired to author the medical mystery novel Crossmatch after reading one of Daphne du Maurier’s bestseller novels Rebecca. Miranda revealed that her tacit knowledge and expertise in the medical field helped her to execute the storyline for her novel Crossmatch. She spent around three years working on the book prior to the publishing of her novel; she had ample time to finish it due to the advent of the COVID-19 induced lockdowns imposed by the Government of Sri Lanka during the peak of the COVID-19 pandemic.

== Awards ==
- 2020, Gratiaen Prize
- 2021, State Literary Award for Best English Novel
