= Ruwanthie de Chickera =

Sri Lankan playwright, dramatist, screenwriter, activist, writer and theatre director

- Born: 1975 (age 50–51)
- Education: Methodist College, Colombo
- Alma mater: University of Colombo; University of Manchester
- Occupations: playwright, dramatist, screenwriter, activist, writer and theatre director
- Writing career
- Notable work: Middle of Silence
- Notable awards: Gratiaen Prize (2000)
- Website: dechickera.com

Ruwanthie de Chickera also spelt as Ruwanthi de Chickera (born 1975) is a Sri Lankan playwright, dramatist, screenwriter, activist, writer and theatre director. She has engaged in research on various fields including politics, sexuality, education, religion, arts, violence and culture. She jointly won the Gratiaen Prize along with Lakshmi de Silva in 2000.

== Biography ==
She pursued her primary and secondary education in Methodist College, Colombo. It was at Methodist College that she developed an interest in writing, especially focusing on drama, stage plays, and writing scripts for inter-house school plays. She became more serious in writing aspect when narrating drama scripts during school days. She had grown up as a passionate reader since her childhood and she almost became passionate about Enid Blyton's novels. She considers Milan Kundera, Margaret Atwood and Arundathi Roy to be her favourite authors. Her interests in theatre and reading books propelled her to become a screenwriter.

== Career ==
She performed her debut play Middle of Silence at the age of nineteen. Her debut play was based on the power struggle that erupted between a husband and a wife. Middle of Silence was adjudged the best English creative writing by a Sri Lankan for the year 2000, for which it won the Gratiaen Prize in the same year. She also won the 1997 edition of the British Council International New Playwriting Award for South Asia for her debut play. Middle of Silence was also staged in London's West End, and Ruwanthie de Chickera became the first Sri Lankan playwright to receive the distinction of having her play staged in London's West End. Her second play Two Times Two displayed three-dimensions of the characters involved. Two Times Two was short-listed as one of the finalists for the 1998 World Student Drama Trust Award.

She obtained her Honorary degree in English literature from the University of Colombo. She received her Master of Arts in Applied Theatre from the University of Manchester. She wrote the screenplay for the 2008 Sri Lankan-Italian comedy film Machan, which was based on the missing Sri Lanka national handball team during the 2004 European tour. Machan received critical acclaim for the storyline and screenplay, for which it gained wider international recognition.

She serves as the Head of Research and Writing of Arts and Cultural Policy Desk in Sri Lanka. She is actively involved in the Cultural Policy Desk framework, which has been implemented to draft a national cultural policy in line with the principles of the Government of Sri Lanka. She founded the Stages Theatre Group, which is regarded as one of the most prominent theatre companies in Sri Lanka, and she also worked as the artistic director of Stages Theatre Group for a brief stint. She was featured in the official Queen's Jubilee Celebrations Publication by the Government of the United Kingdom in recognition for her contributions to theatre.

She created a bilingual drama titled Kalumali which was based on the research regarding gender disparity. Kalumali was initiated by Ruwanthi along with 13 other women who were actively involved with Sinhala and English Theatre. She directed the play Dear Children Sincerely, which was staged at the Lionel Wendt Art Centre in 2017, and it was based on seven singular events that articulated a dramatic change in Sri Lanka's history over the course of seven decades. She also directed a play titled PING! Virtually everything is fine which was inspired based on the increasing trend of digital dependency among youth population in Sri Lanka. PING! Virtually everything is fine was also developed by Ruwanthie de Chickera in collaboration with Lihan Mendis in order to raise awareness among young people in Sri Lanka to be mindful of their digital usage and screentime. She has also written journal articles for The Island and Groundviews. She has also took part in several international conferences and workshops in theatre and writing.
