= Ameena Hussein =

Sri Lankan sociologist and writer (born 1964)

- Born: 1964 (age 61–62); Colpetty, Colombo, Sri Lanka
- Occupations: Novelist, short-story writer, social activist, editor, sociologist, publisher

Ameena Hussein (born 1964) is a Sri Lankan sociologist, novelist, editor. Her collections of short stories, Fifteen and Zillij, were nominated for several awards.

== Biography ==
Ameena Hussein was born in 1964 at Colpetty (now known as Kollupitiya), in the Western Province of Sri Lanka. Her father, Madhi Hussein, was a lawyer while her mother, Marina Caffoor, was a housewife. Ameena has a younger sister. Her parents influenced both of their daughters to maintain the reading habit from a young age. Ameena Hussein was educated at the St.Bridget's Convent, which is situated in Kollupitiya. She was not a good student and was a slow writer.

== Literature career ==
Hussein was generally regarded as a slow writer and it took about eight years to write her first novel, The Moon in the Water. Despite this, her first novel on publication received international recognition and was longlisted for the Man Asian Literary Prize in 2007.

She has published two award-winning collections of short stories, Fifteen and Zillij. Fifteen was shortlisted for the Gratiaen Prize in 1999, and was also nominated for the International Dublin Literary Award in the same year. Apart from writing short stories Hussein has also published books for children such as Milk Rice, Milk Rice 2 and The Vampire Umpire.

== Social services ==
She has served as a consultant for several international human rights non-governmental organizations. Most notably, she was an editor of Sometimes There is No Blood, a survey of rural women by the International Centre of Ethnic Studies.

In 2003, she co-founded jointly with her husband Sam Perera the Perera-Hussein Publishing House to encourage future and emerging writers in Sri Lanka.
