= Jeanne Thwaites =

British writer (1929–2019)

Jeanne C. Thwaites (December 1929 – December 2019) was a British writer and photographer. She won the Gratiaen Prize in 1998. She lived in Sri Lanka and California.

She was a photographer in California.

== Writings ==
- Mother and Child (1967)
- Horses of the West (1968)
- It's a Sunny Day on the Moon
- Starting and Succeeding in Your Own Photography Business (1984)
- Looking for Veronica: A Novel (1994)

== See also ==
- Burgher people
