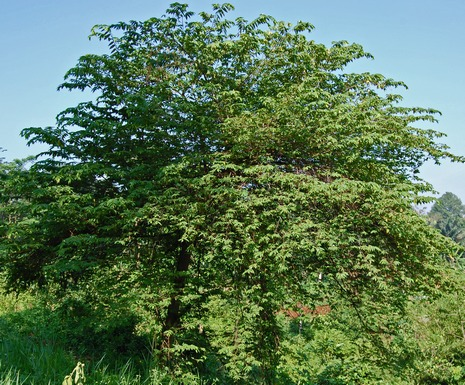
- Muntingia calabura

Scientific classification
- Kingdom: Plantae
- Clade: Tracheophytes
- Clade: Angiosperms
- Clade: Eudicots
- Clade: Rosids
- Order: Malvales
- Family: Muntingiaceae; C.Bayer, M.W.Chase & M.F.Fay

Genera
- Dicraspidia; Muntingia; Neotessmannia

= Muntingiaceae =

Family of flowering plants

The Muntingiaceae are a family of flowering plants, belonging to the rosid order Malvales. The family consists of three genera: Dicraspidia, Muntingia, and Neotessmannia, each with a single species. They are woody plants of the tropical regions of America. The older Cronquist system placed these genera in the family Tiliaceae, with which they share morphological similarities, but have no evolutionary affinity. Muntingia calabura is widely introduced in tropical regions, because of its edible fruit. Dicraspidia donnell-smithii and Neotessmannia uniflora are the other two species in the family, the latter only known from herbarium specimens.
