= Sunil Wijesiriwardena =

Sri Lankan university lecturer and literary critic

Sunil Ernest Wijesiriwardena is a Sri Lankan literary critic, academic, researcher, civil activist, university lecturer, poet, writer, author, playwright, civic leader and translator. He initiated the 2015 civic movement to generate a positive discourse on cultural rights and to draft a National Cultural Policy for Sri Lanka.

He has contributed significantly to Sinhala literature, arts, theatre and culture. He has often advocated the importance of inculcating the arts and culture in order to ensure that they play a role in transforming societies without compromising the abilities of future generations.

== Career ==
He obtained his PhD in Bio Science from the State University of Moscow/Peoples' Friendship University of Russia in 1981. He returned to Sri Lanka in 1982 soon after his graduation and completion of his higher studies and began a career in socio-political work as a volunteer. He also served in various capacities as a visiting lecturer of University of Colombo and Kelaniya University. He also worked predominantly as a senior consultant to develop a new syllabus from scratch with a major revamp/overhaul for the Performing Arts Department at the Sri Palee Campus which is affiliated to the University of Colombo.

He joined as a volunteer member of the Sub Selection Committee as a part of the Japan-Sri Lanka Friendship Cultural Fund in 1977, and has been worked to identify and mentor candidates for the Bunka Awards, and to promote Sri Lanka-Japan ties.

He also served as the chairman at the National Arts and Cultural Policy of Sri Lanka. He was the founder-director of the first Independent Cultural Institute called Vaibhavi Academy of Fine Arts which was devoted to transform cultural rights in Sri Lanka. He was also a co-chairman of the Arts and Cultural Policy Desk.

He has also attended many art exhibitions and has advised contemporary artists in addition to his analysis on the works of artists in exhibitions. He has also served as a member in several panel of judges of art festivals and art competitions in Sri Lanka including the likes of H. A. I. Goonetileke Prize, Fairway National Literary Award as well as in overseas countries.

He worked as a lyricist in Premasiri Khemadasa's stage drama Manasa Wila. He has also reviewed many of the works of filmmaker Malaka Dewapriya and he defended Dewapriya's Radio Drama series Kanata Paharak, which received backlash from critics due to the selection of titles for some of the episodes in the series.

In 2003, he was invited as one of the guests by Japan Foundation during a cultural field trip/cultural study tour. He also served as a permanent member of the International resource group on ethics education from 2005 to 2012 which was organized by Arigato Foundation (Geneva-Tokyo) in collaboration with the UNICEF.

In December 2013, he also paid tribute to human rights activist Sunila Abeysekera by staging a live music performance to mark the commemoration of Sunila Abeysekera which was conducted by The Women and Media Collective in collaboration with INFORM and the Free Media Movement, Sri Lanka.

On 19 February 2015, he received a special commendation from the Ambassador of Japan. In 2016, he spoke to BBC Sandeshaya studio in an interview where he discussed about sharing each other's value systems in an organised manner to bring about ethnic reconciliation in Sri Lanka.

His Poetry Journey was published in 2017 with the publication of his debut collection of poems titled 'Giri Muduna Mage Niwahana'. The book was shortlisted for the final four rounds of the 2018 Royal Book Awards. He had also took part in few demonstrations as a part of the 2022 Sri Lankan protests and had engaged in few interviews in Gotagogama village.

In March 2022, he began delivering lectures about transformational leadership as part of Youth Leadership Academy (YLA) in Bandaranaike Centre for International Studies at Bandaranaike Memorial International Conference Hall (BMICH). The YLA later went on to be expanded into the Bandaranaike Academy for Leadership and Public Policy (BALPP), the country's first institute focused on leadership and education in public policy and governance.
