= Carmel Miranda =

Sri Lankan writer and novelist

Carmel Miranda is a Sri Lankan writer, novelist and doctor. She won the Gratiaen Prize for her work Crossmatch (2020).

== Biography ==
She was regarded as bookworm since her early childhood, as she displayed her keen interest as an avid reader by reading books written by Enid Blyton. She also pursued a keen interest in reading comics, including The Adventures of Tintin and Asterix. She also developed a firm interest on the literary works of Agatha Christie.

== Career ==
She attended the St. Bridget's Convent for her primary and secondary education. She pursued her higher education by enrolling at the Faculty of Medicine at the University of Colombo. She studied to become a doctor and after gaining employment as a qualified doctor, she rendered her services at Anuradhapura and Colombo. She then eventually pursued her postgraduate studies in the United Kingdom. Carmel also maintained a rigid work schedule on a rotation basis in West Asia for some time. She also propelled her career prospects as a freelance anaesthetist for a considerable period of time.
