= Malinda Seneviratne =

Sri Lankan poet, critic and journalist (born 1965)

Malinda Seneviratne මාලින්ද සෙනෙවිරත්න
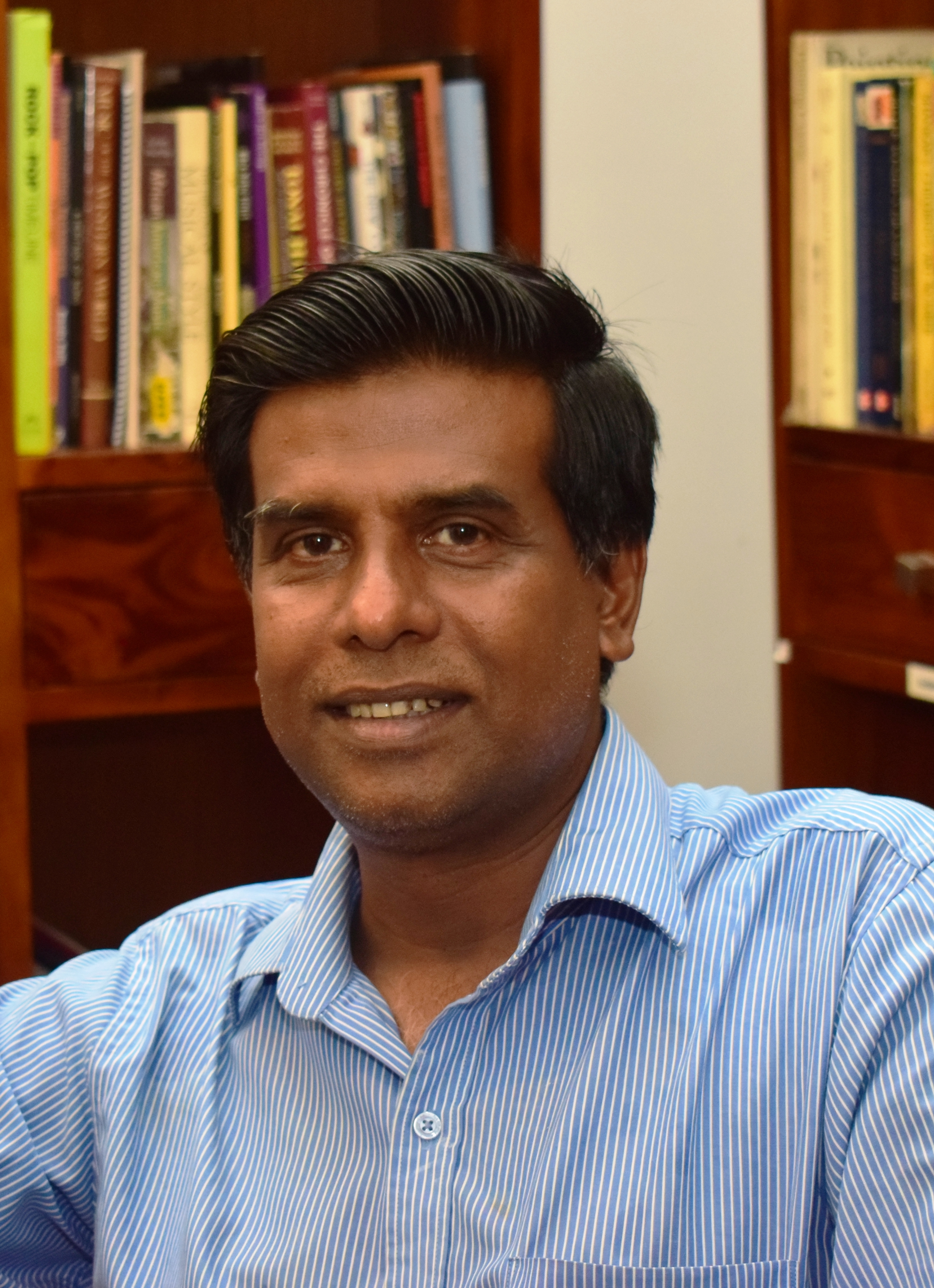
- Malinda Seneviratne
- Born: 23 September 1965 (age 61); Colombo, Sri Lanka
- Education: Royal College, Colombo; University of Peradeniya; Harvard University; Cornell University
- Occupation: Writer
- Spouse: Samadanie Kiriwandeniya
- Children: Mitsandi, Dayadi
- Awards: Gratiaen Award (2011 and 2013)

Malinda Channa Pieris Seneviratne (born September 23, 1965) is a Sri Lankan poet, critic, journalist, translator, political commentator, and activist. Known for his outspoken political views, his opinion pieces are among the most widely read in English in Sri Lanka. His poetry collections and translations of Sinhala texts have also been widely read and acclaimed, and have been frequently shortlisted for the prestigious Gratiaen Award. On February 17, 2021, he assumed duties as the Director of the Hector Kobbekaduwa Agrarian Research and Training Institute.

== Early life and education ==
Seneviratne was born in Colombo to Gamini Seneviratne, a civil servant who would retire as the chairman of the Coconut Development Authority, and Indrani Seneviratne, who taught English literature and Greek and Roman civilization in various schools, her longest tenure being at Royal College, Colombo. Both of them were English honours graduates from the University of Peradeniya. Malinda is the second in the family. His elder brother is Arjuna and younger sister Ruvani, an acclaimed novelist in the United States. They were all born to a culture of connoisseurship and appreciation of the arts. Malinda's later forays into literature were therefore initiated by his parents, especially his father, who had got him to write a poem when he was 12 years old about a tune played on the piano.

He attended Royal College, Colombo. He dabbled in several extra curricular activities, with chess and scouting being his main interests. Although initially a student in the Mathematics stream, he eventually won all major awards for English literature. He captained the school chess team in 1983 and under his leadership Royal won the National Championship in 1983. That year he sat for his A Levels, where he offered Mathematics and obtained results that were probably adequate to secure placement in one of the Science Faculties in the university system. However, he had already opted to sit for his A Levels in the Arts Stream the following year, where again he secured good enough results to enter University. He entered Peradeniya in 1985 and read for a bachelor's degree in sociology.

Owing to his exceptional academic performance in his first year, Seneviratne was selected to an exchange program at Carleton College, Minnesota for a Trimester. During the infamous insurrection of the eighties, when universities were shut down in Sri Lanka, he decided to apply for scholarships to study in the US. He got a scholarship to Harvard University in December 1988. After completing his bachelor's degree, he returned to Sri Lanka in 1991.

After several short-term jobs, including a teaching post in the ELTU, Medical Faculty, Peradeniya University in 1992, he was hired as an Editor at the Agrarian Research and Training Institute in March 1993 before leaving it the following year. He then resumed his higher studies, when upon a friend's advice he applied and was selected to the University of California's School of Urban and Regional Planning in 1994. The following year he moved to Cornell University, to read for a PhD in Development Sociology. However he never completed his PhD. He completed the coursework requirement, but his thesis (titled “Journeying with Honour: In Search of the Vague and Indeterminate”) had not met with the favor of his committee, which held that he could obtain a terminal masters with minor revisions, but if he wanted to pursue doctoral studies major revisions would be necessary. He decided to return to Sri Lanka.

== Political career ==
=== Early forays into politics ===
Malinda's early initiation into politics and Marxism was through his father, who had been a Trotskyite as an undergraduate, and the newspaper of the Revolutionary Communist League at the University of Peradeniya, Kamkaru Mawatha (“The Path of Labour”). Nanda Wickramasinghe, a batch-mate of his father who was attached to the League and who regularly visited him, enthralled young Malinda. When he entered Peradeniya in the eighties, however, he found himself disagreeing with the UNP and the JVP, as well as the then emaciated and divided SLFP.

Towards 1987, one year before the UNP-JVP bheeshanaya commenced, Malinda began supporting Vijaya Kumaratunga and his newly formed United Socialist Alliance (USA), and though he would later disengage from Vijaya's political beliefs, he felt at the time that he was the only person who could reckon with both sides of the political divide. After his assassination in 1988, Malinda would support Ossie Abeyagoonasekera, who would later leave the US and support the UNP.

An even more significant political association with the then newly formed Ratavesi Peramuna, the precursor to the Sinhala Nationalist Jathika Hela Urumaya (JHU), would follow his return from Harvard, having falling under the influence of two ideologues he'd known through University: Patali Champika Ranawaka and Athuraliye Rathana Thera. In 1992, an exhibition displaying LTTE, IPKF, and JVP human rights abuses in Matara was attacked by thugs connected to the UNP, which compelled a meeting in Wadduwa to discuss what the party members could do next. The meeting was disturbed by the police who, on a tipoff, arrested 15 members including Rathana Thera, Champika, and Malinda and held them for three weeks.

Tortured at the orders of a drunken OIC, they took their case to the Supreme Court. The case, Channa Pieris and Others v. Attorney General and Others, would later be archived by the University of Minnesota’s Human Rights Library. Justice A. R. B. Amerasinghe, in his judgment, argued that the Ratavesi Peramuna “was not an organisation whose members or adherents were engaged in purposes prejudicial to national security or the maintenance of public order” and was therefore entitled to freedom of association, the deprivation of which by the police compelled the Court to order the State to pay 5,000 rupees per applicant as compensation. In the meantime, the Ratavesi Peramuna morphed into the Janatha Mithuro.

=== Later political career ===
After completing his higher education, though only partially, at Cornell University, Malinda continued his association with Ranawaka and Rathana following their formation of the Sihala Urumaya (SU), the next avatar of the Janatha Mithuro. Malinda supported them and ended up eventually as the party candidate in Jaffna. The SU received more votes than the JVP and the Nava Sama Samaja Peramuna and Malinda received just seven preferential votes. He joined The Sunday Island immediately after the election and thereafter was not associated with any political party. However, he was associated with the National Movement Against Terrorism (NMAT), which he joined in 2006 on the condition that NMAT would operate independently of the SU. NMAT was a formation launched by those earlier associated with the Janatha Mithuro and it was in effect an agitation front for the SU. His association with NMAT ended about a year later when the propaganda work had helped realise the intended outcome: a national effort to rid the country of the terrorist menace.

=== Beliefs and advocacy ===
Malinda's political beliefs have been a mix of Marxism, nationalism, and liberalism, though he has on separate occasions rejected these ideologies. A firm believer in citizenship unhindered by racial or religious prejudices, he nevertheless remains a staunch opponent of Tamil separatism, which has earned him the ire of those who advocate federalism and devolution. His articles to various publications during the war years (from 2000 to 2009) and even afterwards have uncompromisingly taken issue with Eelamist propaganda, particularly the traditional homelands thesis of the LTTE.

His nationalist outlook underlines his belief in good governance and democracy. Having written on the dangers inherent in the 18th Amendment, which the government of former Sri Lankan president Mahinda Rajapaksa enacted in order to do away with presidential term limits, he has also frequently discussed the need for independent commissions, institutionalised on paper via the 17th Amendment.

He has on several occasions expressed his views on federalism and devolution at various forums, and even submitted certain proposals and recommendations to the Lessons Learnt and Reconciliation Commission in 2011, where he noted with respect to separatist propaganda that “A pandering to political realities based on constructed mythologies can tide a country over in the short term but necessarily generate further rupture down the line” and added that “In the absence of a robust case for devolution, minority grievances must necessarily defer to the notion of citizenship.”

== Writing career ==
=== Early stints: From "The Island" to "The Nation" ===
In October 2000, after his return from Cornell University and prior to his engagement with the Sihala Urumaya, Malinda was hired as an "understudy" to the then editor of the Sunday Island, Manik de Silva. After a tussle with some disagreeable journalists attached to its Sinhala paper, the Divaina (to which he contributed as well), he left the Island in 2004 and did part-time work as a copywriter at Phoenix Advertising via an invitation from its Chairman, Irvin Weerackody. In 2006 he was hired as the Deputy Features Editor and Editorial Writer at The Nation upon an invitation by the founder CEO of Rivira Media Corporation (which owned the paper), Krishantha Cooray.

After running into some disagreements there, Malinda was hired as an assistant consultant director of the Secretariat for Coordinating the Peace Process for three months in 2007 and as the consultant director of the Special Media Unit at the Government Information Department from November 2007 to November 2008. From then on, he worked as a freelance writer, submitting a weekly average of 10 or 11 articles to six different publications (including the Daily Mirror and the Daily News), as well as a copywriter at Phoenix, until October 2011, when upon another invitation by Rivira Media Corporation he assumed the role of chief editor at The Nation.

Through these years Malinda shaped The Nation to a more nuanced format, with sections devoted to poetry, arts columns exploring both English and non-English cultural spheres, and political columns articulating divergent ideologies. It was during his editorship that the paper gave coverage to the infamous milk powder scandal involving Fonterra. Not surprisingly, therefore, his editorship at The Nation became his best few years by his own confession, until 2015 when, thanks to a tussle with the management over their acceptance of a previously sent, and by default invalid, letter of resignation, he vacated his post citing constructive termination. By then the paper had been shut down, to be reshaped and launched as a tabloid later on.

=== Later stints as poet, translator, and critic ===
Malinda's interest in literature, sustained by his parents, his school, and later his university, was fermented by his discovery of Pablo Neruda and his Residence on Earth in a bookstore in Cambridge, Massachusetts, on the day of Neruda's death (which incidentally happens to be Malinda's birth date, September 23), in the 1990s. He was profoundly influenced by Neruda, García Márquez, and Eduardo Galeano, as well as his childhood encounters with Western literature, music, and elocution.

His first poetry collection, Epistles: 1984–1996, was published in 1999. He submitted his poetry, in manuscript form, for the Gratiaen Award on six occasions between 2007 and 2013. Five of these collections were shortlisted: Threads in 2007, The Underside of Silence in 2008, “Some texts are made of leaves” in 2011, “Open Words are for Love Letting” in 2012, and “Edges” in 2013, while “Stray Kites on Stringless Days” didn't make it to the shortlist in 2010. He won the Gratiaen Award for "Edges". Two years earlier, in 2011, he had won the H. A. I. Goonetileke Prize (also with the Gratiaen Trust) for his translation of Simon Navagattegama’s acclaimed Sinhala novel Sansaranyaye Dadayakkara, which he first read at Cornell University and translated, in part, for a class exercise on Marx, Nietzsche, and Freud.

Since his employment at the Sunday Island, Malinda has written on a wide range of topics, from the theatre to the cinema to dance. He has written extensively on artists, including directors, painters, sculptors, musicians, and writers. His criticism of the local English sphere, over what he considers to be its culture of self-congratulation and self-importance, has been one of his enduring motifs.

== Personal life ==
Malinda's first marriage in 1994 ended a year later. In 1998 he married Samadanie Kiriwadeniya, who is currently the chairperson of SANASA Development Bank. They have two daughters, Mithsandi and Dayadi, who attend school at Ladies' College, Colombo.
