= Lalitha Withanachchi =

Sri Lankan writer, academic and journalist

Lalitha Karalliadde Withanachchi, also spelt Lalitha Witanachchi, was a Sri Lankan educator, journalist and writer. She worked as a journalist at Daily News for 12 years. She was the joint winner of the inaugural edition of the Gratiaen Prize.

== Biography ==
Lalitha was born to a family background of Kandyan descent in January 1927 at Bandarawela, Uva Province. She began her primary education at Hillwood College in Kandy. Her husband Douglas Witanachchi served as a District Land Officer in Anuradhapura.

== Career ==
She completed her higher education at the University of Ceylon and graduated with Geography Honors in 1950. Prior to her university entrance, she cleared the university entrance examination with flying colors and ended up winning an exhibition award in geography. She also became the first female graduate hailing from Uva Province. She obtained her post-graduate diploma in education in 1963 from the University of Peradeniya. She taught English and Geography at the Good Shepherd Convent in Nuwara Eliya.

Prominent Sinhala writer E. R. Eratne, who served as the principal of Anuradhapura Central College in the 1950s, recruited Lalitha Withanachchi as one of the teachers for the Central College. It was reported that E. R. Eratne was propelled to take key measures by bringing the likes of Lalitha Withanachchi in order to fill the vacancy of teachers at Central College. She eventually spent three decades as a teacher. She also joined the public service of Sokoto State, Nigeria, and was subsequently appointed as the Senior Master of English at the Haliru Abdu Teachers’ College in Bernin Kebbi.

In September 1981, she joined the Lake House Group of Newspapers and began working at the Features Desk of the Daily News publication. She resigned from the Lake House Group of Newspapers in December 1995. She wrote and published several books including Customs and Rituals of Sinhala Buddhists, Little Bamboo, The Paddy Bird and The Wind Blows over the Hills.

== Awards ==
She claimed the first prize in an International Short Story Contest hosted by the Linguistics Department of the Macquarie University in Australia for her short story titled "The Truth", which was based on the true story behind the 1983 Black July riots in Sri Lanka. She was also adjudged the joint winner of the prestigious Gratiaen Award in 1993, along with Carl Muller.

She also received the Esmond Wickramasinghe Award for Journalism in English for her article titled "My Days at Anuradhapura Central College". She was conferred with the prestigious Kala Bhoosana Award in recognition of her contributions to the arts and English literature. In 1993, she received the Uva Erudites Award during a special event organized by the then Governor of Uva Province to honor persons born in the Uva Province who had achieved significant achievements in their respective fields.

== Death ==
She died on 26 September 2021 at the age of 94.
