= Gamini Akmeemana =

Sri Lankan writer, novelist and editor

Gamini Akmeemana (Sinhala: ගාමිණී අක්මීමණ is a Sri Lankan writer, journalist, photographer and editor. He won the Gratiaen Prize for his work The Mirage (1997).

== Biography ==
Gamini grew in close to semi-rural Piliyandara and Bandaragama but his parents moved to Colombo in the mid-1970s. . He attended three Sinhala-medium government schools—Sri Sumangala College, Panadura, and later won a scholarship to Isipathana College, Havelock Town, Colombo, followed by Ananda College, Colombo 10. He studied Advance Level English literature at Aquinas College, Colombo 08, under the distinguished Sri Lankan-Indian teacher Mr. Kuruvilla, and that sparked his creative imagination.

== Career ==
He began his career as journalist and sub-editorscribe in 1982, working for the Jordan Times in Amman, Jordan, when Dr. Rami Khouri and Nayef Hawatmeh shared the editor post. It was in Jordan that he bought his first SLR camera and taught himself photography. Back in Sri Lanka after 1984, he free-lanced as feature writer and photojournalist for the Island newspaper, working alongside Lasantha Wickrematunga and Ajith Samaranayake. In 1988, he was hired as photographer for the newsly established office of Agence France Presse (AFP) in Colombo, but left soon after due to internal differences. Jobless, and newly married, he opted to work as a licensed tourist guide because of his French language skills. His creative writing efforts date back to the early 1980s, when he wrote several plays in English after meeting Dr. Ian Carruthers, professor of English at Yarmouk University, Jordan. No production came out of this, but he continued his literary efforts back in Sri Lanka. Richard de Zoysa was the first leading Lankan literary figure to recognise Akmeemana's talent, rushing the manuscript of his play 'Chang Er' (based on a Chinese legend) to the National Arts Council literary competition in (1984/85?) followed subsequently by another play which co-shared the prize with Dr. Ediriweera Sarachchandra (year of prize needs to be corroborated). Several short stories, too, were published in this period in Dr. Rajiva Wijesinghe's New Lankan Review. One of these ("The Drummer" was selected as study/discussion material) for the GCE syllabus. In 1996, he joined the Midweek Mirror, a tabloid paper which later became the Daily Mirror. He was the principal feature writer there at the time (Lalith Alahakoon was the editor and J. S. Tissanayagam worked as sub-editor, while Sivaram ('Taraki') worked as free-lance defense columnist). By now, Akmeemana was focusing on his long fiction and his first novel 'The Mirage' was the result. He later embarked on a career towards honing his skills in photography, and he also predominantly focused on the aspects of photojournalism. He then worked for a short time as a photojournalist for AFP News Agency before becoming the feature writer at The Island newspaper for a brief period.

Akmeemana wrote the unpublished manuscript The Mirage about writer and activist Rajani Thiranagama's life and assassination in a four-month marathon. It won the Gratiaen Prize in 1997 despite competition from another Sri Lankan writer with a well received book released in a heavily publicized fashion.

He later rejoined as the editor at Daily Mirror and he served in the Daily Mirror's Associate Features column. In 2021, his short story The Lucky Charm was conferred with the first prize in the prose section at the 2021 Literary Competition which was organised and conducted by the English Writers Collective of Sri Lanka. He was also adjudged as the winner of Arts Council Award on few occasions.
