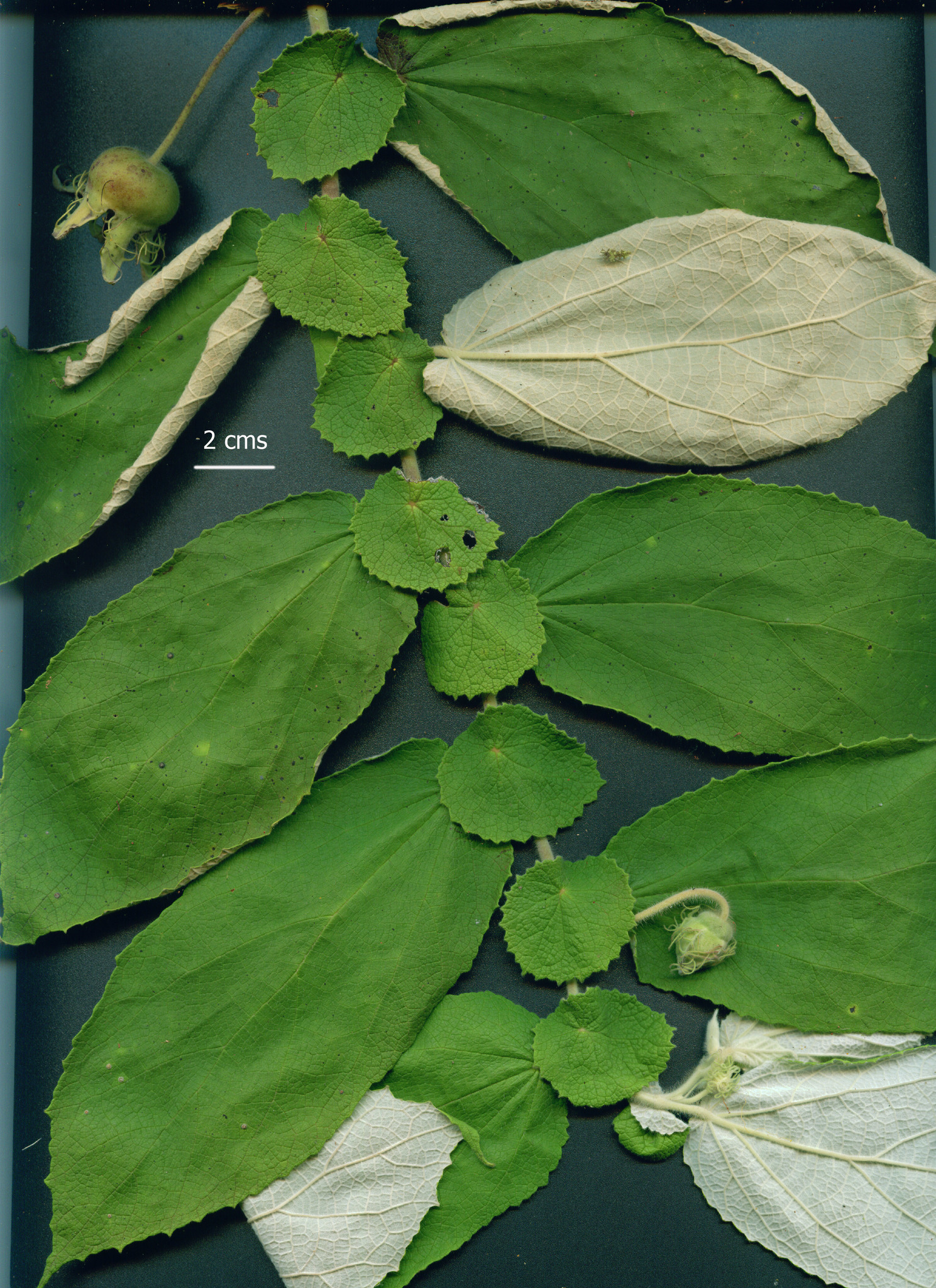

Scientific classification
- Kingdom: Plantae
- Clade: Tracheophytes
- Clade: Angiosperms
- Clade: Eudicots
- Clade: Rosids
- Order: Malvales
- Family: Muntingiaceae
- Genus: Dicraspidia; Standl.
- Species: D. donnell-smithii

Binomial name
- Dicraspidia donnell-smithii Standl.

= Dicraspidia =

Genus of plants

Dicraspidia is a monotypic genus of flowering plants belonging to the family Muntingiaceae. The only species is Dicraspidia donnell-smithii.

Its native range is Central America.
