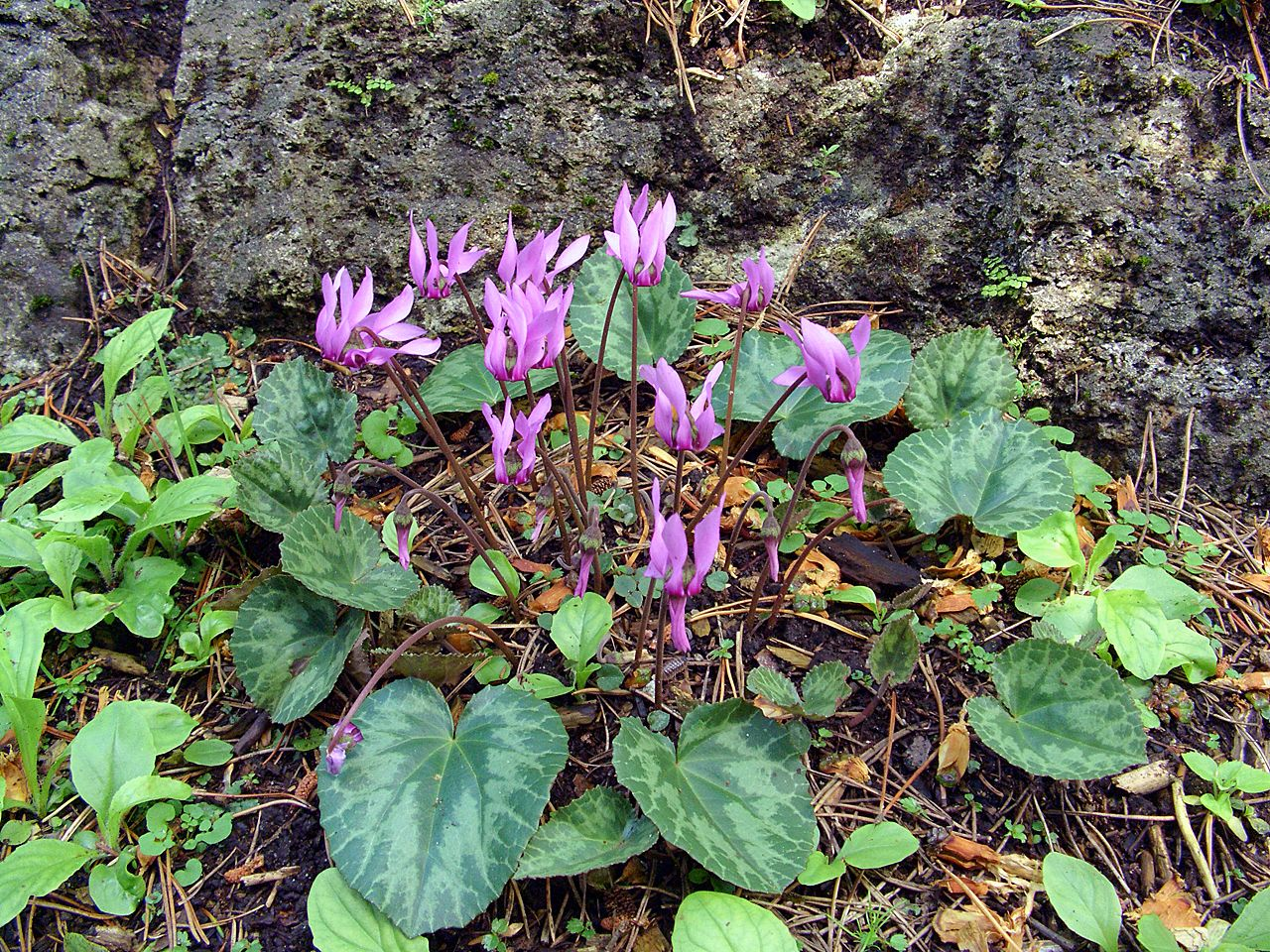

Scientific classification
- Kingdom: Plantae
- Clade: Tracheophytes
- Clade: Angiosperms
- Clade: Eudicots
- Clade: Asterids
- Order: Ericales
- Family: Primulaceae
- Genus: Cyclamen
- Subgenus: C. subg. Cyclamen
- Species: C. purpurascens

Binomial name
- Cyclamen purpurascens Mill.

Synonyms
- Cyclamen europaeum L.

= Cyclamen purpurascens =

Species of flowering plant in the primrose family

Cyclamen purpurascens, the purple cyclamen, is a species of flowering plant in the genus Cyclamen of the family Primulaceae, native to central Europe, northern Italy, and former Yugoslavia. It is an evergreen tuberous perennial with (usually) variegated leaves, and deep pink flowers in summer.

== Etymology ==
The species name purpurāscēns is a present participle from the Latin verb purpurāscō "become purple".

== Distribution ==
Cyclamen purpurascens grows in deciduous or mixed woodland, especially among beeches and over limestone, at 250–1,300 m (800–4,300 ft) above sea level in continental Europe from eastern France across the Alps to Poland and south to Bosnia and Herzegovina. It is also found in mountainous parts of Romania and western Russia, where it has been introduced.

== Description ==
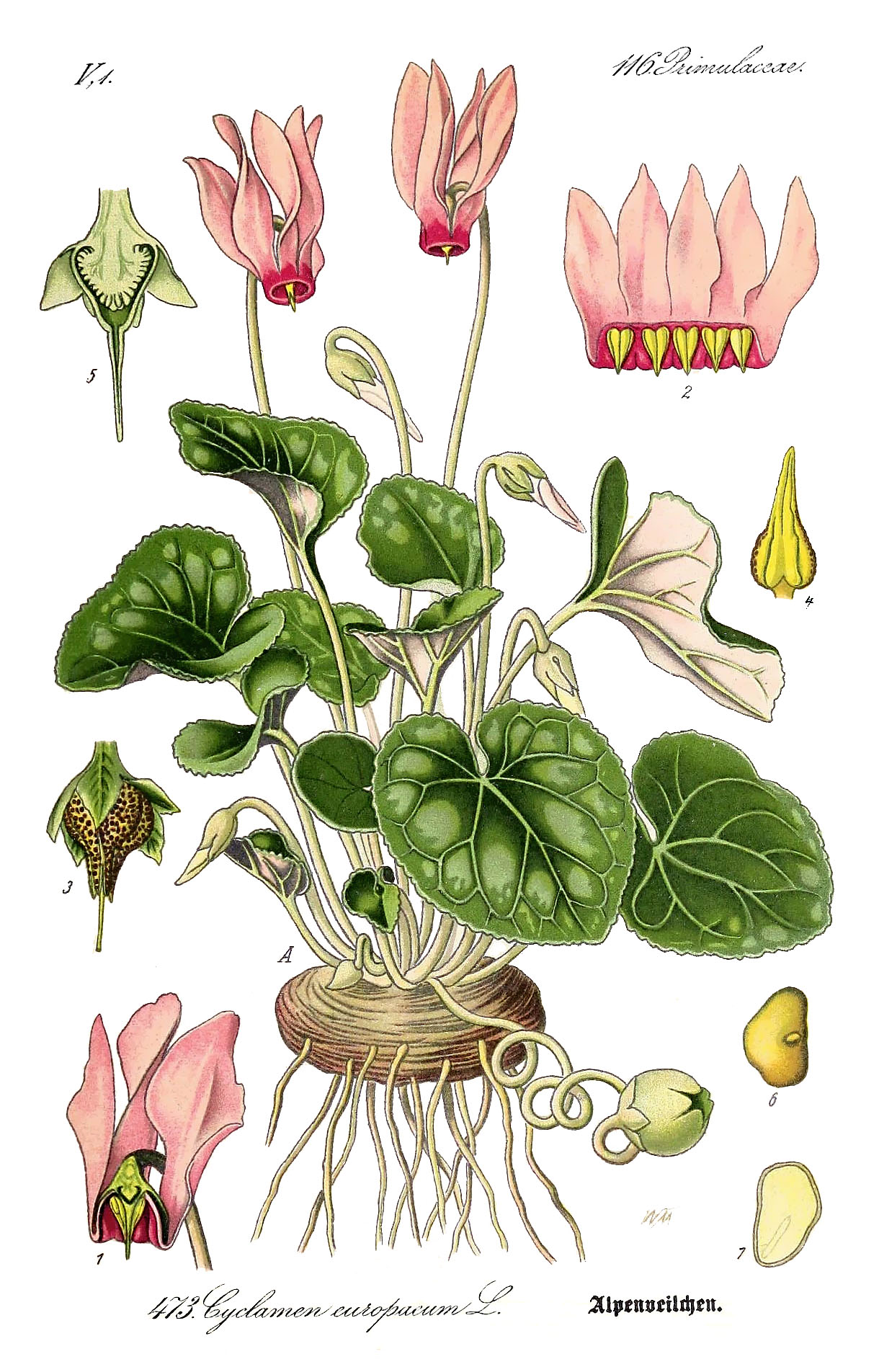
Whole plant (Thomé, Flora von Deutschland)

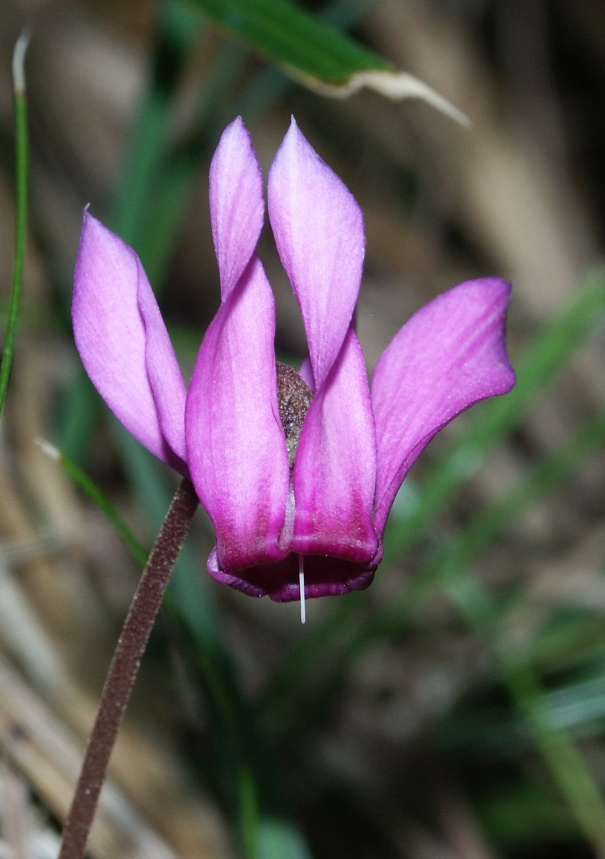
Closeup of flower

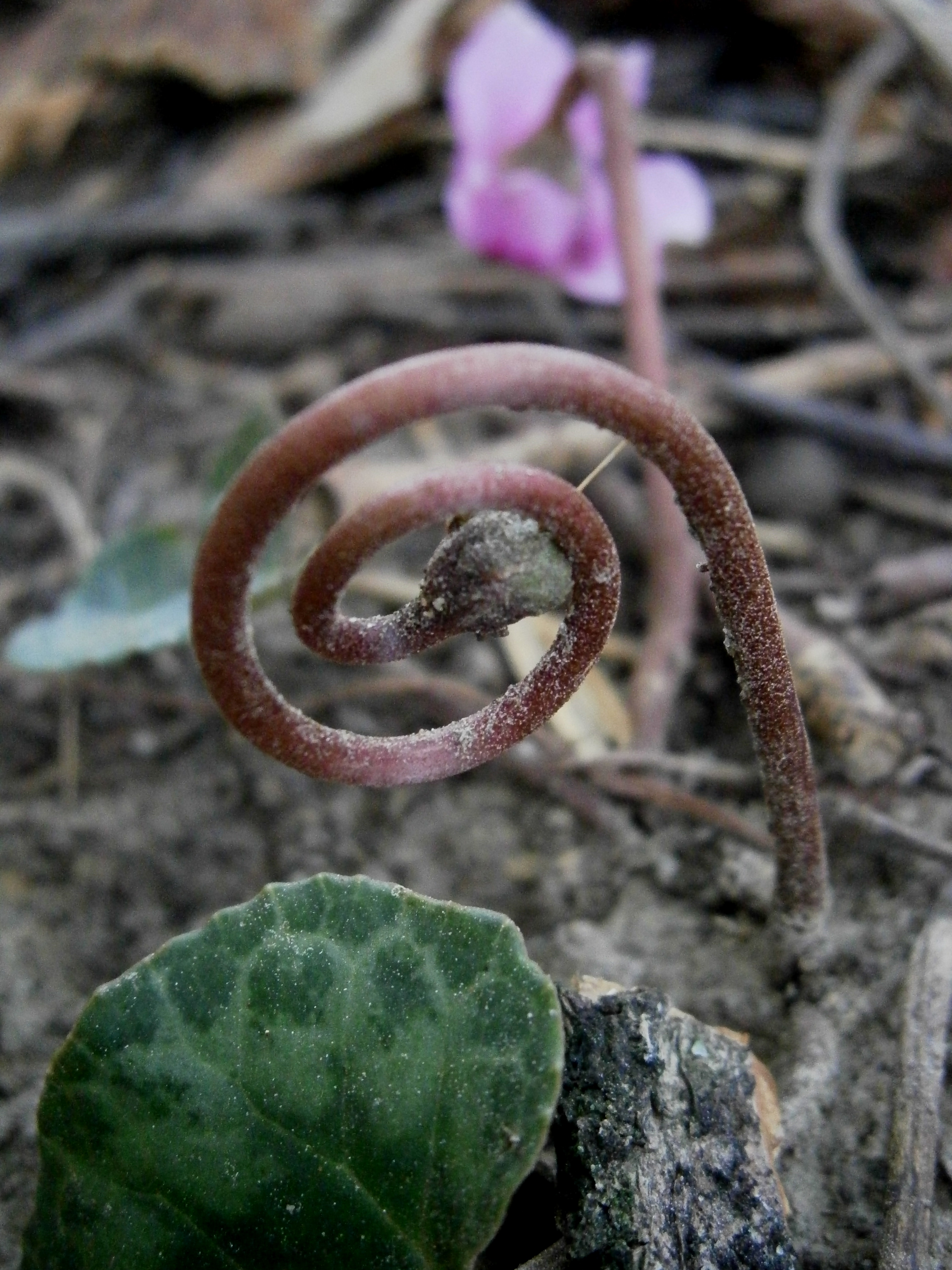
Seed-bearing stem beginning to coil

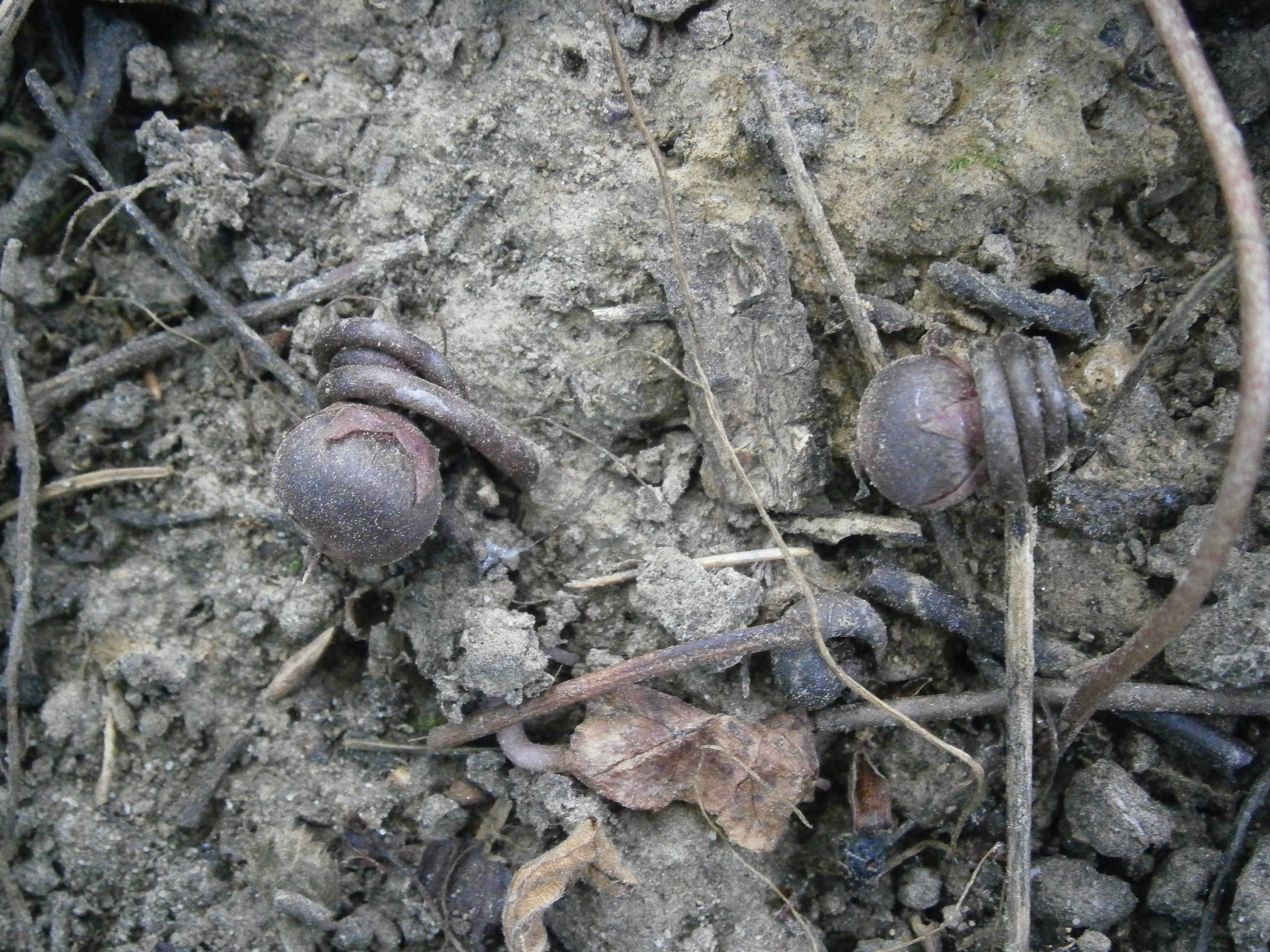
Two nearly ripe seed pods

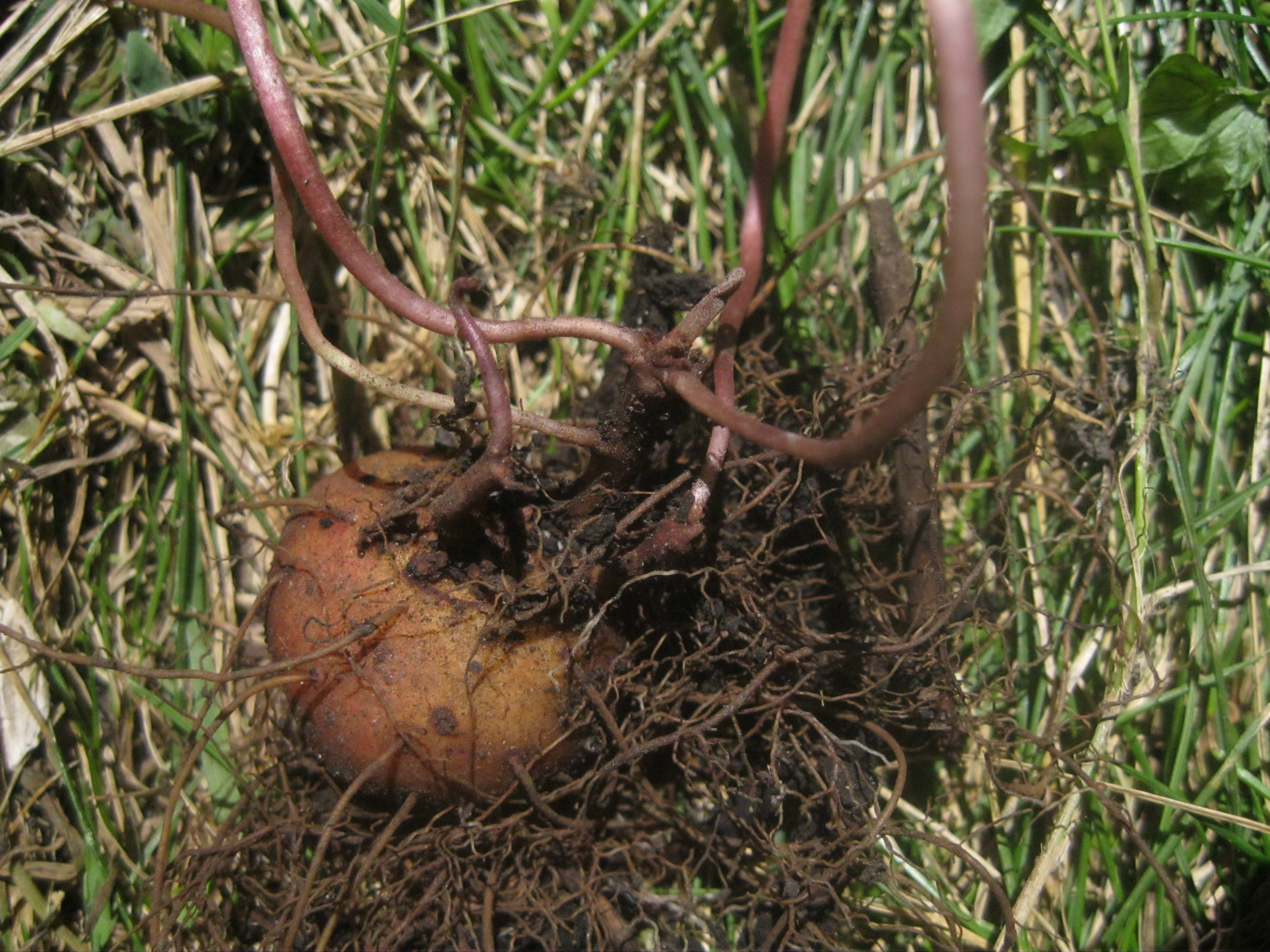
A young tuber

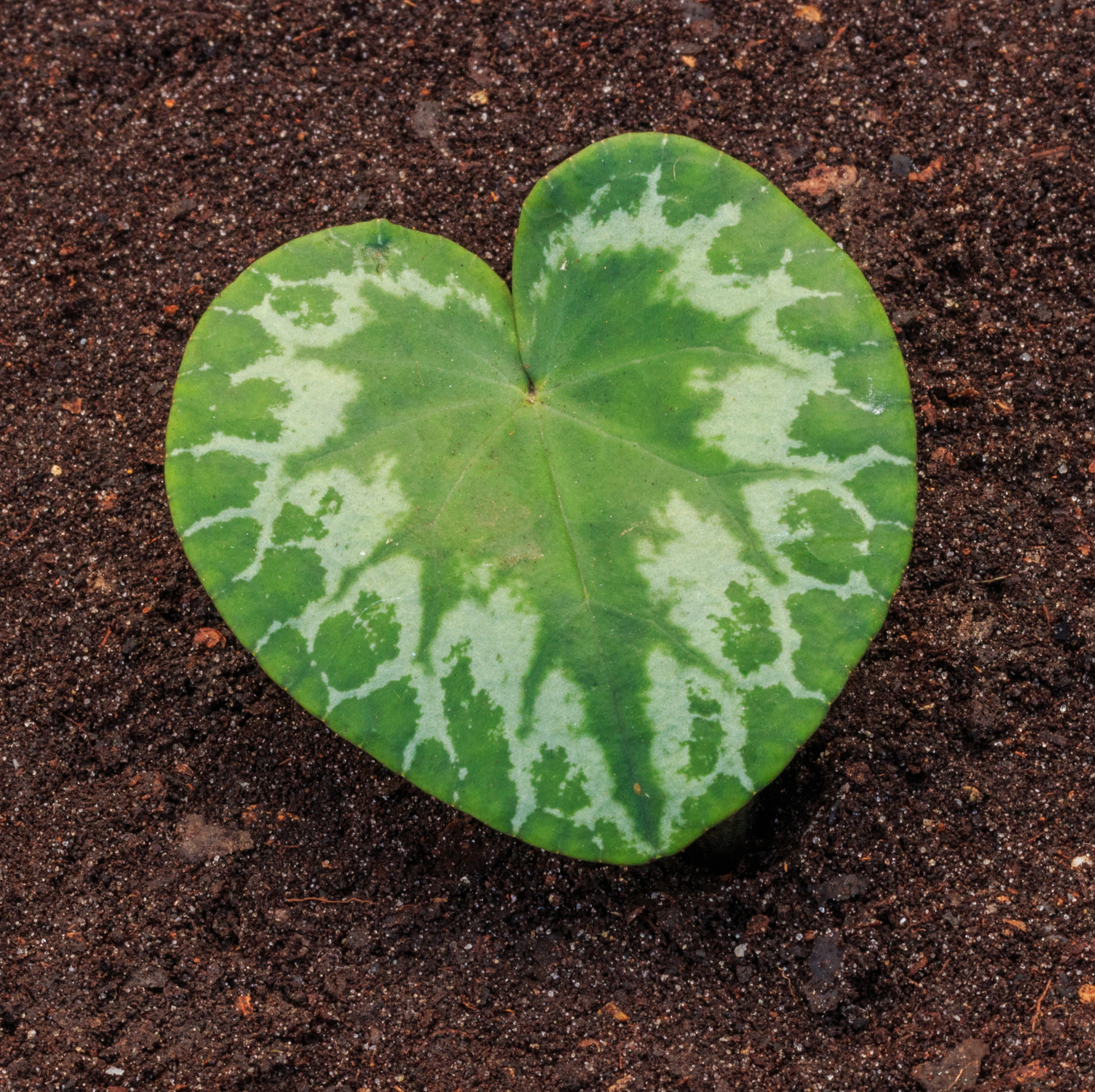
Leaf

C. purpurascens blooms from summer to autumn, keeps its leaves through the winter, and produces seeds and new leaves the next summer.

=== Tuber ===
Flowers and leaves come from buds at the top of a round-flattened tuber. Roots come from the sides and bottom. Older tubers may become distorted, forming "fingers" with separate growth points. Misshapen tubers are also found in Cyclamen rohlfsianum.

=== Flowers ===
Flowers appear before or with the leaves, and have 5 upswept petals. Flowers are sweetly scented, ranging in color from pale rose-pink to purple or rose-carmine and are 17 to 25 mm (0.67 to 0.98 in) long. Petals are elliptical and twisted, often curled into auricles, although less prominent than those of Cyclamen hederifolium. Forma "album" has white flowers, though it is more difficult to establish. 'Lake Garda' has silver leaves and pink flowers.

=== Leaves ===
Leaves are kidney-shaped to heart-shaped, as wide as long or wider. The leaf edge is smooth or slightly toothed, unlike the closely related species Cyclamen colchicum, which is always prominently toothed. Leaf color varies from all-green to all-silver, but the most common pattern is green with light green to silver marbling that roughly follows the outline of the leaf. The underside is red-purple. Because of the cool and moist climate in the plant's native range, it is almost evergreen: new leaves appear in summer while the old leaves are fading. All other cyclamens, except for the closely related Cyclamen colchicum, are summer-dormant in their native range.

=== Fruit ===
After fertilization, the flower stem coils tightly, starting at the end. Seeds, amber when ripe, are held in a round pod, which ripens the summer a year after flowering and opens by 5-10 flaps.

== Subdivisions ==
=== Flower forms ===
Cyclamen purpurascens has three naturally occurring forms, distinguished by flower color:

- Cyclamen purpurascens f. purpurascens — pink to purple flowers
- Cyclamen purpurascens f. carmineolineatum — white flowers with thin band of carmine
- Cyclamen purpurascens f. album — all-white flowers

=== Leaf forms ===
==== Plain leaf ====
Plain leaf forms have all-green leaves. A distinct plain-leaf form is the Fatra form, also called Cyclamen fatrense (misspelled fatranse), from the Fatra Mountains in Slovakia, which has plain leaves (either matt or shiny) and larger and more abundant flowers.

==== Silver leaf ====
Plants of the Silver Leaf Group have silver on the leaves. Subtypes include the Lake Bled form (silver with a netted pattern of veins near the margin), selected from plants near Lake Bled in the Julian Alps of Slovenia, and the Limone or Lake Garda form (silver with a very thin green border and gray arrowhead pattern in the center), selected from plants near Limone sul Garda near Lake Garda in Italy.

Other leaf patterns in the Lake Garda area include dark green with silver or lighter green marbling and plain green.

=== Cultivars ===
The cultivated variety 'Green Ice', developed by Jan Bravenboer of Green Ice Nursery in the Netherlands, has a Christmas tree–shaped silver center and broad green margin. 'Green Lake' is similar, but has a light green zone in the center of the silver.

== Gallery ==
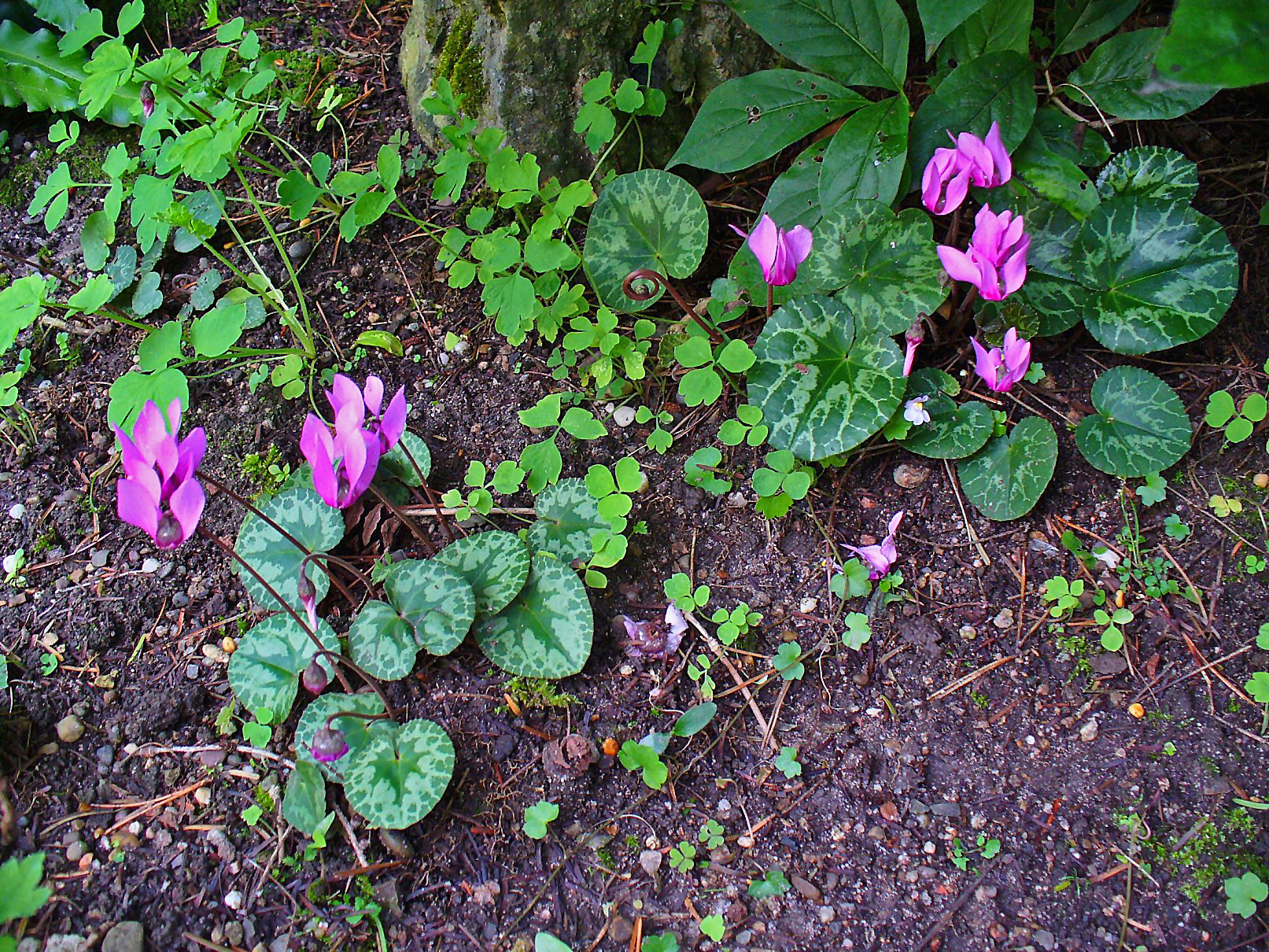
Two plants in a garden in Karlsruhe, Germany

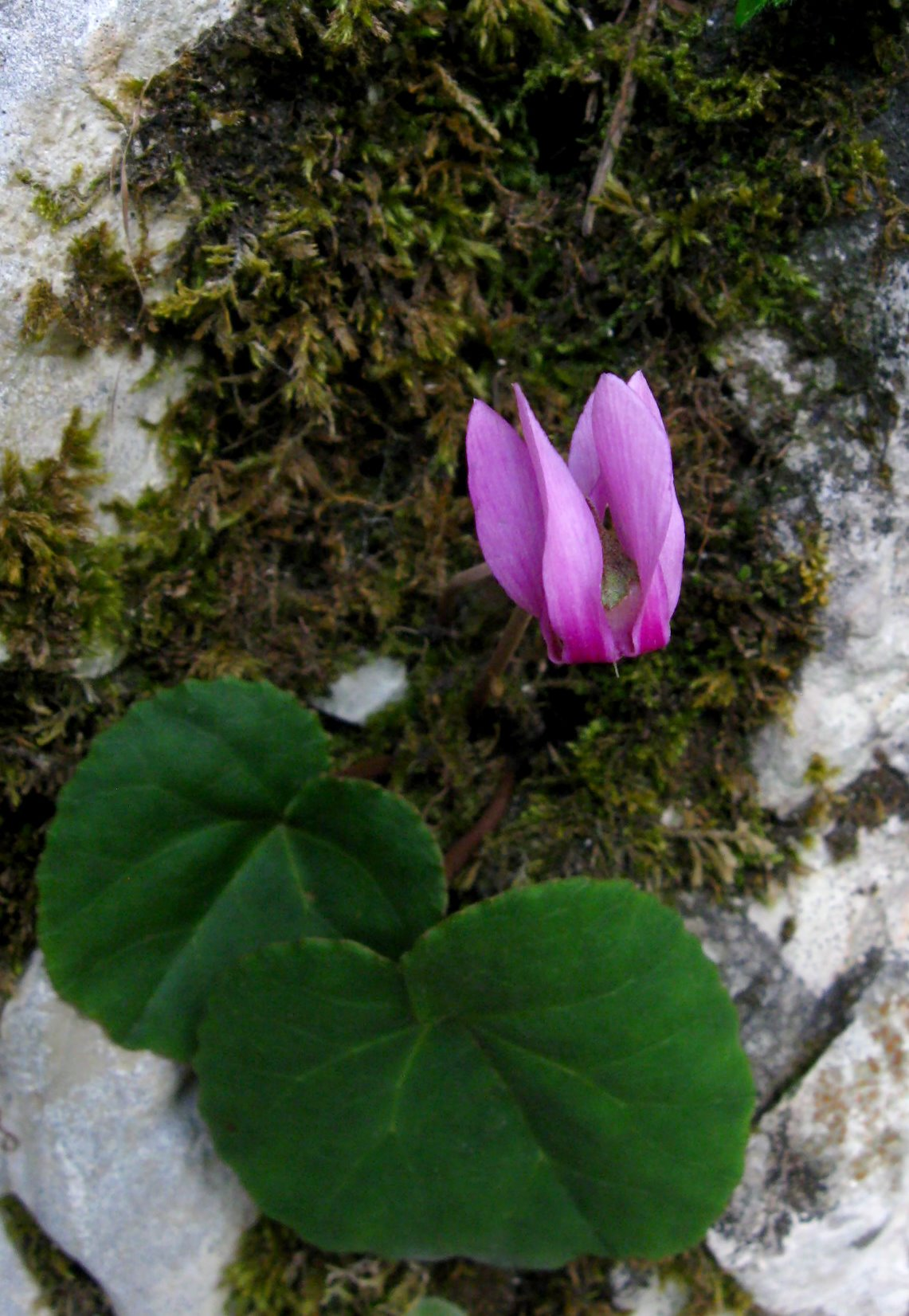
A plain-leaved form at Plitvice Lakes National Park, Croatia

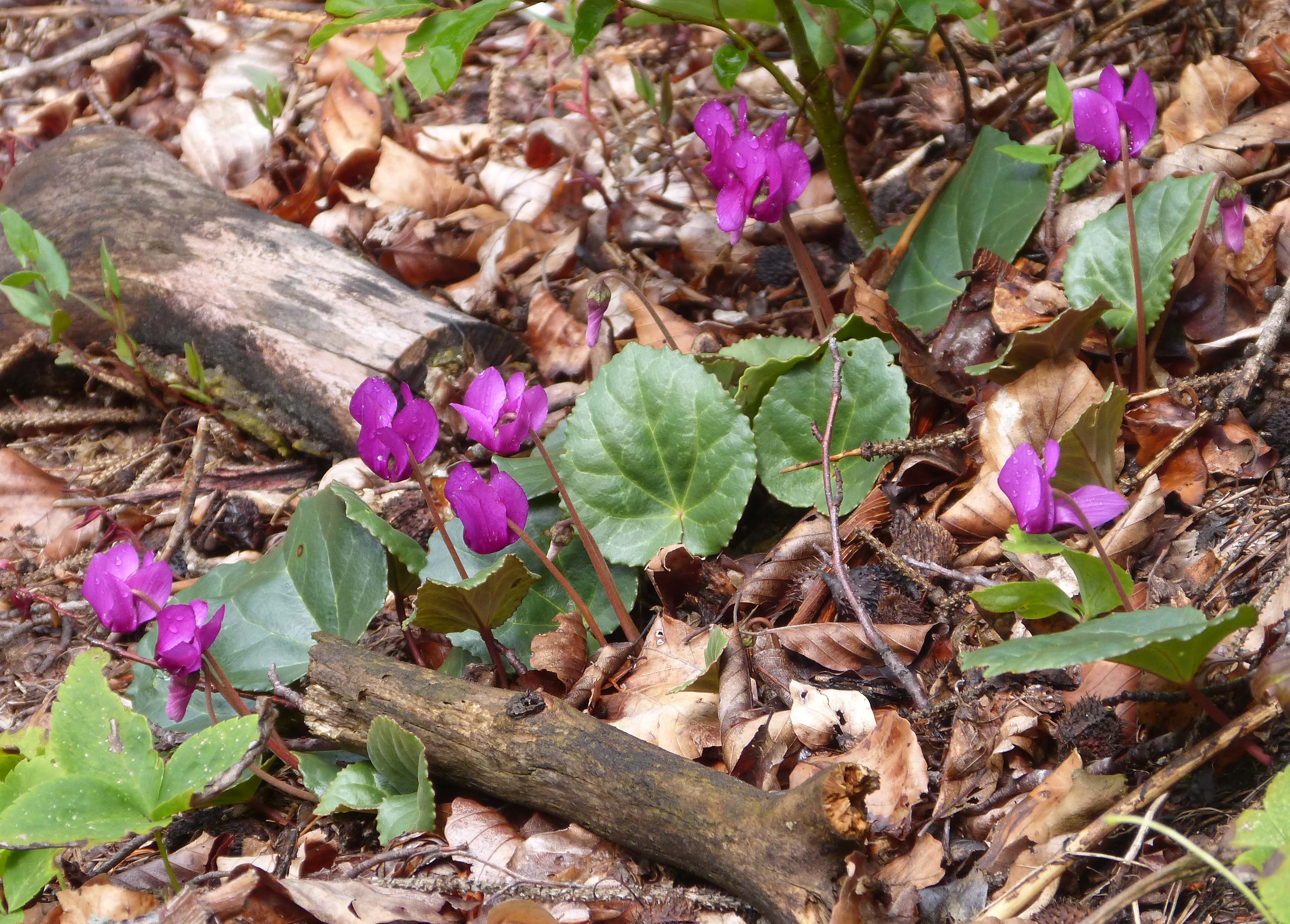
A plain-leaved form in Jesenice, Slovenia

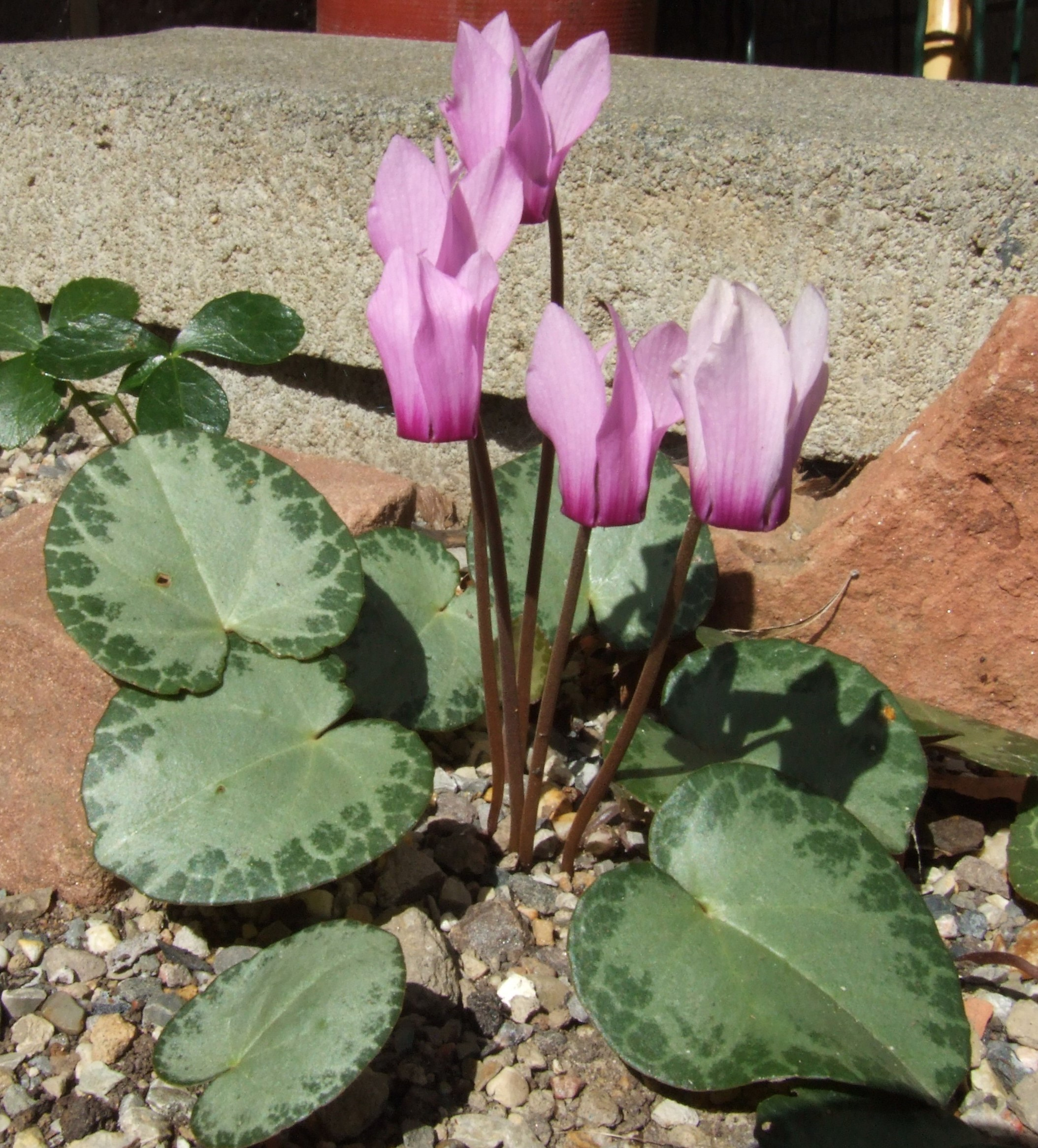
A silver-leaved form with light pink flowers
