= Ashok Ferrey =

Sri Lankan writer

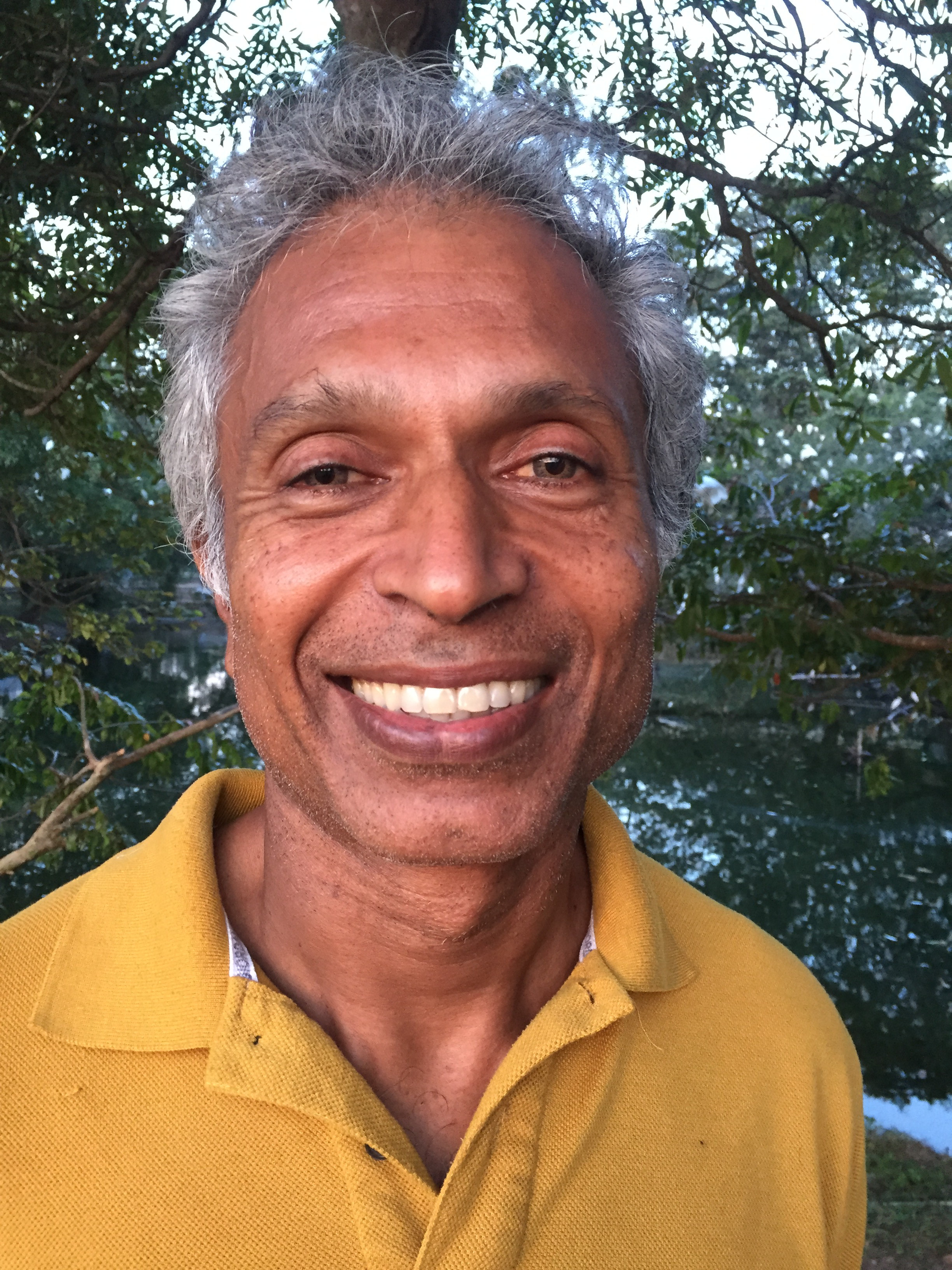
Ashok Ferrey

Ashok Ferrey (born 1957) is a Sri Lankan writer of literary fiction.

== Biography ==
Ferrey was born in Colombo in 1957, raised in East Africa, educated at a Benedictine monastery school at Worth Abbey, and studied pure mathematics at Christ Church, Oxford. Following his graduation, he lived in London and worked as a building developer before turning to write fiction.

He is the author of seven novels, five of which have been nominated for the Gratiaen Prize, Sri Lanka's literary award, founded by Michael Ondaatje. His novel, The Unmarriageable Man won the Gratiaen Prize in 2021. His book, The Ceaseless Chatter of Demons, was also longlisted for the DSC Prize.

== Bibliography ==
- 2003 — Colpetty People
- 2007 — The Good Little Ceylonese Girl
- 2009 — Serendipity
- 2012 — Love in the Tsunami
- 2016 — The Ceaseless Chatter of Demons
- 2017 — The Professional
- 2021 — The Unmarriageable Man
- 2021 — 100 Ways to Write a Book - 100 authors in conversation with Alex Pearl about their backgrounds, motivations and working methods
- 2026 - Hot butter cuttle fish
