= Vijita Fernando =

Sri Lankan journalist (1926–2026)

Vijita Fernando (5 December 1926 – 27 August 2026) was a Sri Lankan journalist, translator and writer. She was a winner of the Gratiaen Prize and has received Sri Lanka’s State Literary Award.

== Life and career ==
After graduating from the University of Ceylon, Fernando worked for over thirty years at the Ceylon Daily News, where she was a feature writer, editor of the women’s page and the children's page. She was later a correspondent to Women's Feature Service (WFS), a network of women journalists worldwide writing from a woman's perspective, with offices in New York City, Manila, Rome and Delhi. She also contributed to the health and science page of IslamOnline, a news and development website based in Cairo, in addition to contributing regularly to local English language newspapers.

While working at the Daily News she began translating Sinhala short stories for the Arts Page: nearly a hundred of her translations appeared in the Daily News in the 1960s and 70s. Her interest persisted, and now she has translated and published five Sinhala novels into English.

A collection of women’s short stories Women Writing: Translations also won a State Literary Award in 2002. Her translation of two novels by the novelist Gunadasa Amarasekara, Out of the Darkness, won the 2003 Gratiaen Prize and a State Literary Award in 2004.

Fernando also wrote her own fiction. She published two collections of short stories, Eleven Stories (1985) and Once, on a Mountainside (1995), and two children’s stories in English, The Kitemaker and A Civet Cat in Our Well! Fernando later published with Sybil Wettasinghe two collections of folk tales based on Andare and Mahadenamutta retold in English, with illustrations by Sybil. She wrote her first novel, titled "Somewhere" in 2015.

She was a chairperson of the Centre for Family Services, the NGO pioneered by Dr Manoranee Saravanamuttu for women and children affected by conflict. Fernando was also a member of SLACLALS, the English Writers' Cooperative, and the Sri Lanka Federation of University Women.

Fernando lived in Welikadawatte, the intellectual community co-founded by her late husband, B.J.B. ("Bonnie") Fernando. She died on 27 August 2026, at the age of 99.
