= Carl Muller =

Sri Lankan writer (1935–2019)

- Born: 22 October 1935; Kandy, Sri Lanka
- Died: 2 December 2019 (aged 84); Kandy
- Occupations: Author, journalist
- Spouse: Sortain Harris
- Writing career
- Notable works: The Jam Fruit Tree; Children of the Lion

Kala Keerthi Carl Muller (22 October 1935 – 2 December 2019) was an award-winning Sri Lankan writer, poet and journalist best known for his trilogy about Burghers in Sri Lanka: The Jam Fruit Tree, Yakada Yaka and Once Upon A Tender Time. He won Gratiaen Awards for The Jam Fruit Tree in 1993 and a State Literary Award for his historical novel, Children of the Lion. He was the first Sri Lankan author to publish a book internationally. He was reported to have died on 2 December 2019 which was confirmed by his son Jeremy Muller.

== Biography ==
Muller was born in Kandy, the eldest in a family of thirteen. Dismissed from three schools, Muller was finally educated at prestigious Royal College, Colombo. He started his first job as a weighbridge clerk at the Mosajee's Wystevyke Mill in Colombo, thereafter he joined the Royal Ceylon Navy and served as a signalman for four years. He then spent four months in the Ceylon Signal Corps, before being discharged as unfit for duty. He then joined the Colombo Port Commission as a signalman in the pilot station. Two years later he joined a new advertising agency established by Tim Horshington. This started his writing career working in advertising, travel and entertainment, before moving into journalism in Ceylon, Dubai and Bahrain. He served as vice-president for international sales at the Export Centre in Sharjah in 1970s with Fred Pettera and later joined Expo Centre Sharjah as part of the management team led by Fasahat Ali Khan under the ownership of Sharjah Chamber of Commerce and industry in 1992. He worked for the Times of Oman during the Gulf war before returning to Sri Lanka due to ill health. He went on to briefly serve in the Ceylon Army and later joined the (?) as a signals officer. He married Sortain Harris. He also worked for Gulf News and Khaleej Times in Dubai, United Arab Emirates.

Muller retired from his lifelong work as the onset of dementia and other medical ailments took a toll on his health. He died on the 2nd of December 2019 at the age of 84 in Kandy with his three children and his grandson at his side.

== Bibliography ==
=== Novels ===
- The Jam Fruit Tree (Winner of the Gratiaen Prize) (1993)
- Yakada Yaka (1994)
- Once Upon A Tender Time (1995)
- Spit and Polish (1998)
- Maudiegirl and the von Bloss Kitchen

=== Historical fiction ===
- Colombo – A Novel (1996)
- Children of the Lion (1997) (Winner of the State Literary Award)
- City of the Lion (2011)

=== Science fiction ===
- Exodus 2300 (2003)

=== Essays ===
- Firing at Random

=== Short Story Collections ===
- A Funny Thing Happened on the Way to the Cemetery (1995)
- Birdsong & Other Tales
- All God's Children (2004) (shortlisted for the Gratiaen Award)
- The Python of Pura Malai and Other Stories (1995)
- Wedding Night (2007)

=== Poetry ===
- Father Samaan and the Devil
- Sri Lanka – A Lyric
- Propitiations
- A Bedlam of Persuasions
- Clouds over my Senses
- Read Me in Silence
- The Thin Red Line
1. Our Star ship and its Sorry Crew

=== Children's fiction ===
- Ranjit Discovers Where Kandy Began (1992) (also rendered in Sinhala)
- The Python of Pura Malai and other stories

=== Academic works ===
- The Elizabethans: The Origin of, and the Great Flowering of Modern English Literature – Volume I

=== Views and reviews ===
- Many Bulls in My China Shop
- More Bulls in My China Shop
- More and More Bulls in My China Shop
- The Bulls are Back in My China Shop

=== Monographs ===
- Glorying in that Great Divide
- Conflict in Cinderella's Kitchen
- The Service Economy: Is there a Dangerous Dichotomisation of Wealth?
- Productivity: The Key to Economic Domination
- Tourism: Aiming for that Magic Million
- God Men Rising: Challenging the Bedrock of Hindu Beliefs and Values
- Conflict Within: Challenging Sovereignty and Human Solidarity

=== Aphorism ===
- Carl Muller's Mental Mayhems

=== Hobbies ===
- Stamp Stories of the USA

=== Travelogues ===
- Indian Journeys

=== Works edited ===
- Mews and Purrs (Lancashire, England)]
- The Tide Press of a Dedicated Life: A Tribute to Christine Spittel-Wilson
- Rendering Unto Caesar
- The Poems of Destry Muller (Winner of the State Literary Award)
- A Rainbow Sash Adorns my Dreaming Sky
