= Gratiaen Prize =

Literary prize

The Gratiaen Prize is an annual literary prize for the best work of literary writing in English by a resident of Sri Lanka. It was founded in 1992 by the Sri Lankan-born Canadian novelist Michael Ondaatje with the money he received as joint-winner of the Booker Prize for his novel The English Patient. The prize is named after Ondaatje's mother, Doris Gratiaen.

Administered by the Gratiaen Trust based in Sri Lanka, the Gratiaen Prize accepts printed books and manuscripts in a range of genres including fiction, poetry, drama, creative prose and literary memoir. Entries may be submitted by both authors and publishers. Submissions are accepted between 1 and 31 December in a given year and are assessed by a panel of three judges appointed by the trust who are required to short-list three to five entries. The short-list event (open to the public) is usually held in April and hosted by the British Council in Colombo. The gala at which the winner is announced is held some weeks later at a venue selected by the trust and the event sponsors and is for invitees only.

The prize could be awarded for a translated work until 2003, when the trust established the H.A.I. Goonetileke Prize, which is awarded every second year for a work translated into English from Sinhala or Tamil.

== Winners ==
1993

- Carl Muller, The Jam Fruit Tree
- Lalitha Withanachchi, Wind Blows Over the Hills

1994

- Punyakante Wijenaike, Amulet

1995

- Sybil Wettasinghe, The Child in Me
- Rajiva Wijesingha, Servants

1996

- Tissa Abeysekera, Bringing Tony Home

1997

- Gamini Akmeemana, The Mirage

1998

- Jeanne Thwaites, It's a Sunny Day on the Moon

1999

- Neil Fernandopulle, Shrapnel
- Visakesa Chandrasekaram, Forbidden Area

2000

- Ruwanthi De Chickera, Middle of Silence

2001

- Elmo Jayawardena, Sam’s Story
- Sumathi Sivamohan, In the Shadow of the Gun/The Wicked Witch

2002

- Vijita Fernando, Out of the Darkness

2003

- Nihal De Silva, Road from Elephant Pass

2004

- Jagath Kumarasinghe, Kider Chetty Street

2005

- Delon Weerasinghe, Thicker Than Blood

2006

- Senaka Abeyratne, 3 Star K
- Isankya Kodittuwakku, The Banana Tree Crisis

2007

- Vivimarie Vanderpoorten, Nothing Prepares You

2008

- Shehan Karunatilaka, Chinaman: The Legend of Pradeep Mathew

2009

- Prashani Rambukwella, Mythil's Secret

2010

- Sakuntala Sachithanandan, On the Streets and Other Revelations

2011

- Madhubhashini Disanayake-Ratnayake, There's Something I Have to Tell You

2012

- Lal Meddawattegedera, Playing Pillow Talk at MGK

2013

- Malinda Seneviratne, Edges

2014

- Vihanga Perera, Love and Protest

2015

- Thiyagaraja Arasanayagam, White Lanterns: Wesak 2011

2016

- Charulatha Abeysekara Thewarathanthri, Stories

2017

- Jean Arasanayagam, The Life of the Poet

2018

- Arun Welandawe-Prematilleke, The One Who Loves You So

2019

- Andrew Fidel Fernando, Upon a Sleepless Isle

2020

- Carmel Miranda, Crossmatch

2021

- Ashok Ferrey, The Unmarriageable Man

2022

- Chiranthi Rajapakse, Keeping Time and Other Stories
- Yudhanjaya Wijeratne, The Wretched and the Damned

2023

- Ramya Jirasinghe, Father Cabraal’s Recipe for Love Cake

2024

- Savin Edirisinghe's debut short story collection Kata Katha: Gossip, Rumours and Idle Talk won
