= List of libraries in Sri Lanka =

This is a list of libraries in the island nation of Sri Lanka in South Asia.

== National libraries ==
- National Museum Library
- National Library of Sri Lanka

== legal deposit ==
Five copies of all publications which are published in Sri Lanka are to be sent to the Department of National Archives under the Printers and Publishers Ordinance. Four of these copies are sent each to;

- National Library and Documentation Centre
- National Museum Library
- University of Peradeniya library
- Library of the University of Ruhuna.

== Science and technology libraries ==
This category created by using Ministry of Science and Technology institutions.

- Arthur C. Clarke Institute for Modern Technologies (ACCCMT)
- Atomic Energy Authority (AEA)
- Industrial Technology Institute (ITI)
- National Science & Technology Commission
- National Engineering, Research and Development Centre (NERDC)
- National Science Library & Resource Centre
- Sri Lanka Planetarium

== University libraries ==
- University of Peradeniya library
- Sri Jayewardenepura University Library
- Colombo University Library
- Kelaniya University Library
- Moratuwa University Library
- Open University Library
- South Eastern University of Sri Lanka
- Ruhuna University Library
- Wayamba University Makandura Library
- General Sir John Kotelawela Defence University Library
- Eastern University, Sri Lanka Library
- University of the Visual and Performing Arts Library
- Sabaragamuwa University library

== Institutional libraries ==
- International Water Management Institute (IWMI)

International Water Management Institute (IWMI) Publications
IWMI Library Catalog

- Institute of Personal Management Library
- Evelyn Rutnam Institute for Inter-Cultural Studies
- Institute of Bankers of Sri Lanka Library (IBSL)

== Public libraries ==
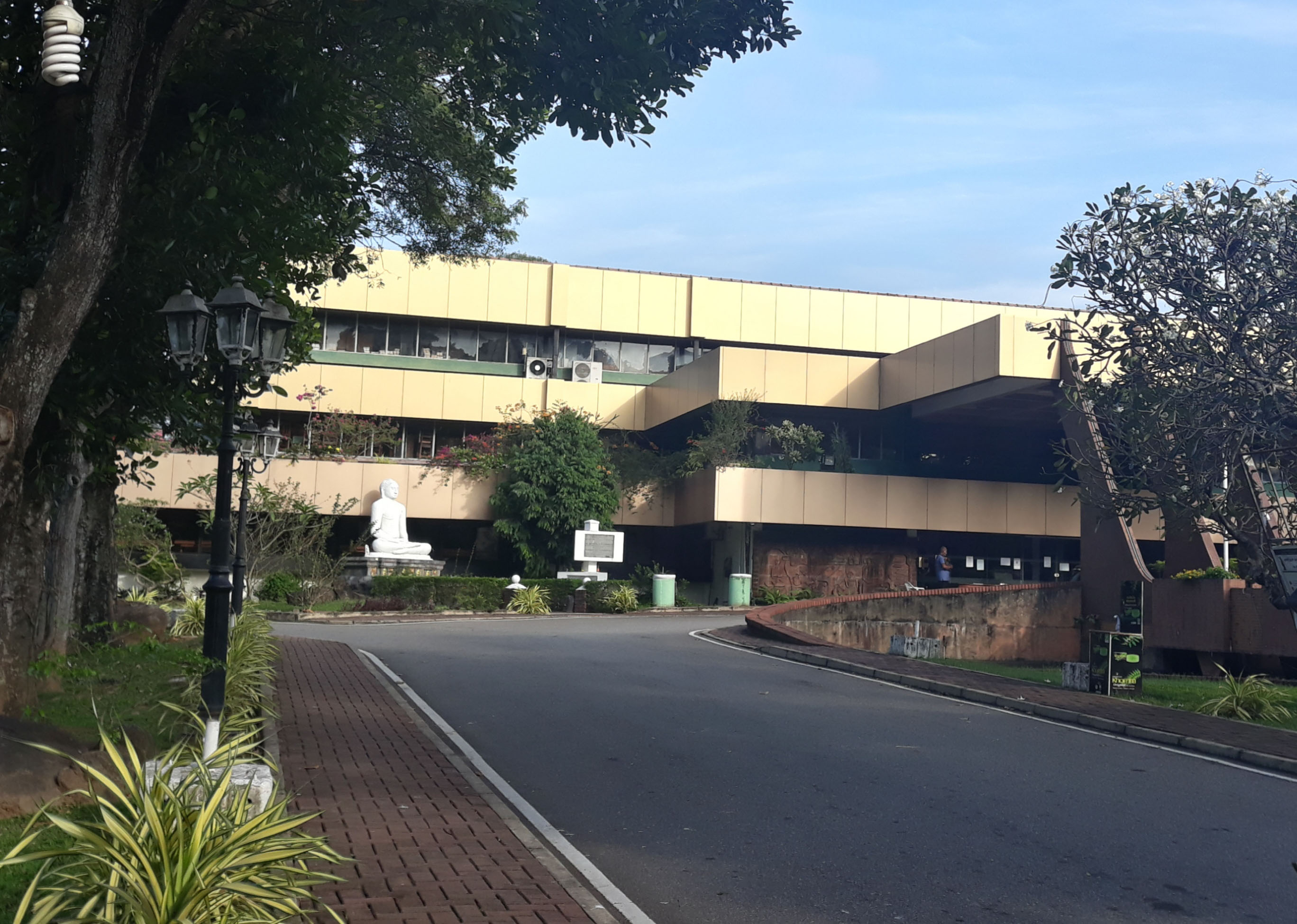
Colombo Public Library

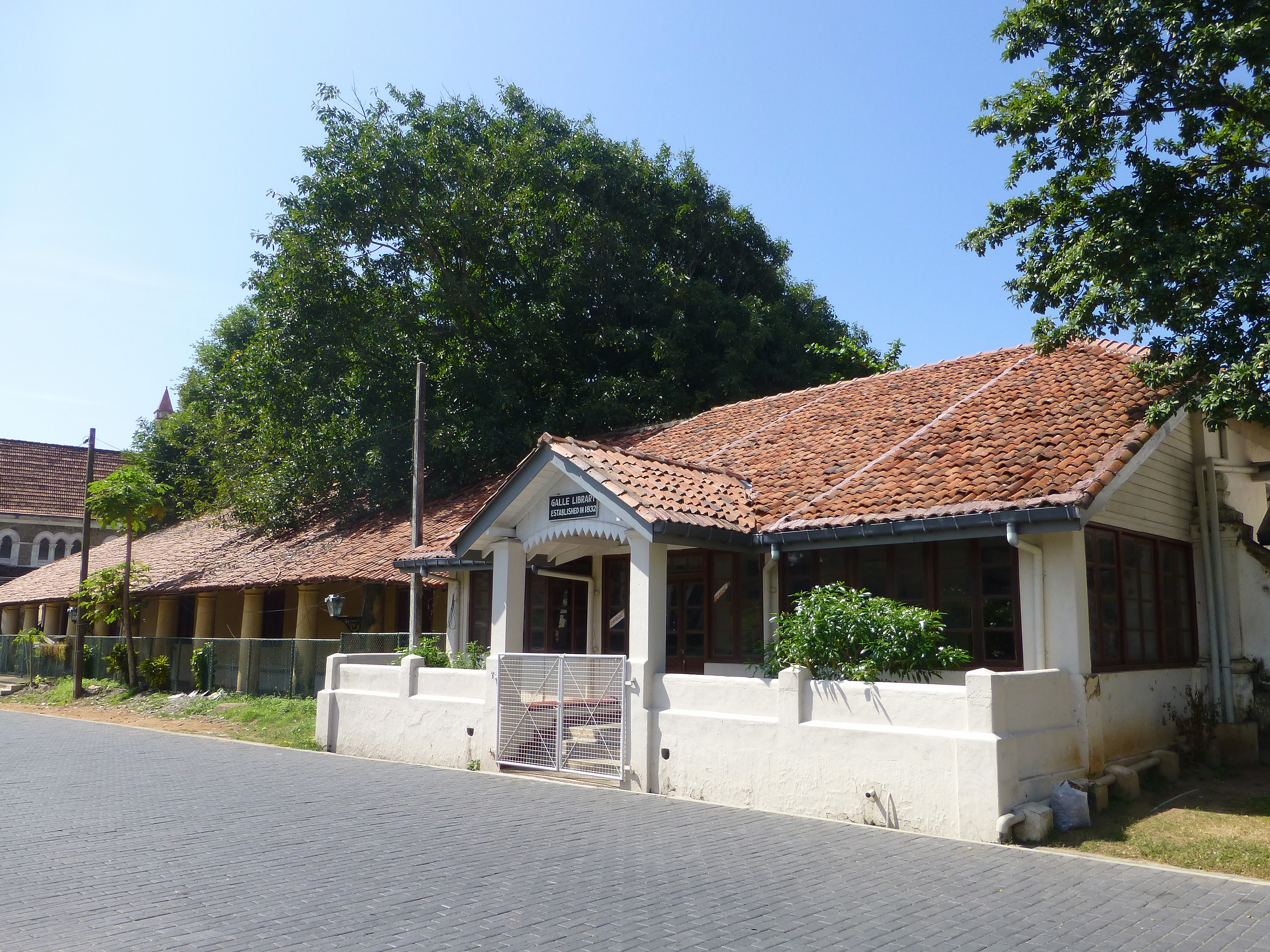
Galle Library in Galle fort was established in 1832

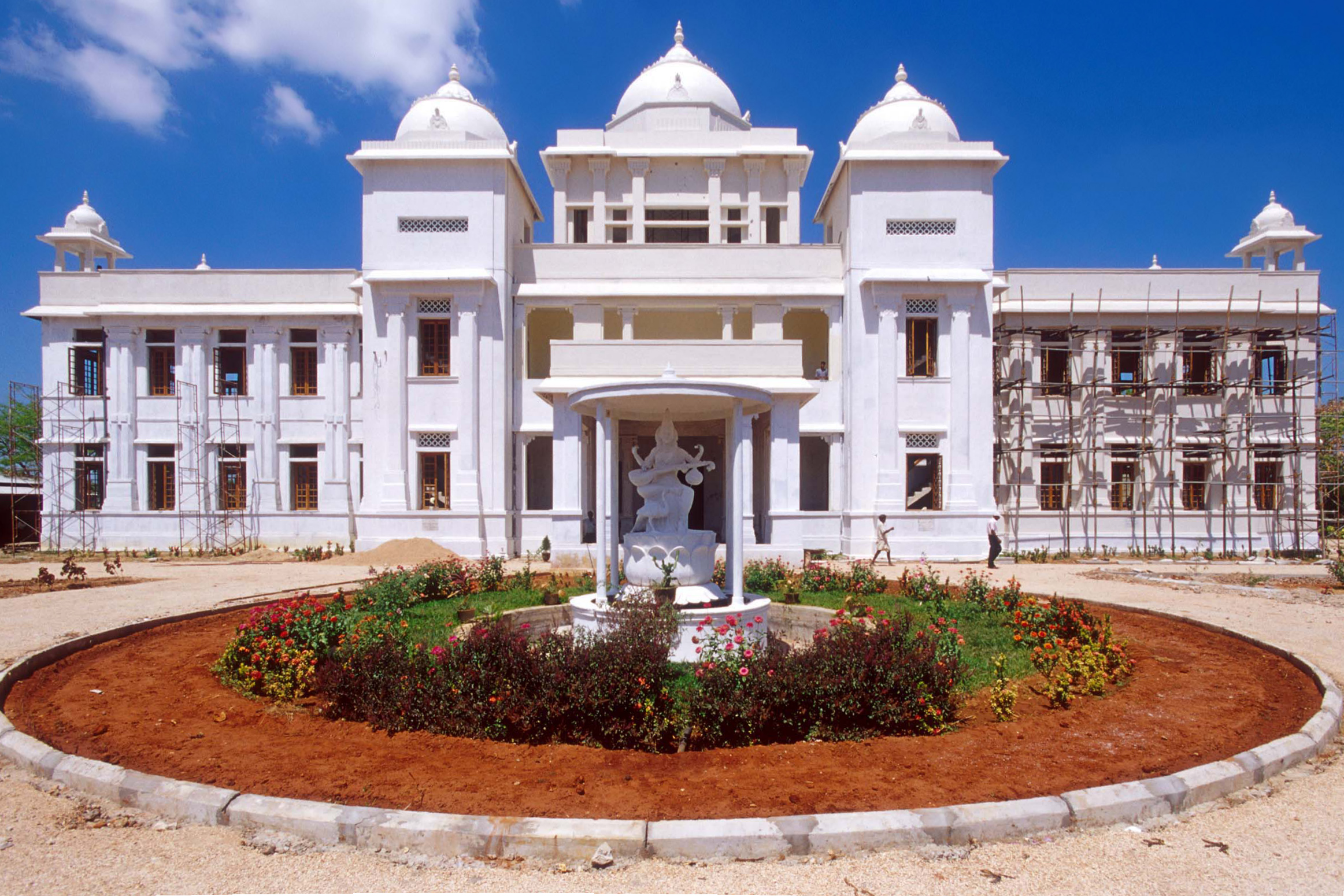
Jaffna Public Library was established in 1933

- Colombo Public Library, Colombo Municipal Council
- Kumarathunga Munidasa Library, Matara Municipal Council
- Moratuwa Public Library, Moratuwa Municipal Council
- Kotte Public Library, Sri Jayawardenepura Kotte Municipal Council
- Dehiwala Central Library, Dehiwala-Mount Lavinia Municipal Council
- Negombo Public Library, Negombo Municipal Council
- Gampaha Public Library, Gampaha Municipal Council
- D.S. Senanayake Memorial Public Library, Kandy Municipal Council
- Nuwara Eliya Public Library, Nuwara Eliya Municipal Council
- Matale Public Library, Matale Municipal Council
- Dr. Richard Pathirana Public Library, Galle Municipal Council
- Galle Library
- Kumarathunga Munidasa Public Library, Dickwella Pradeshiya Sabha
- Ratnapura Public Library, Ratnapura Municipal Council
- Senarath Paranavithana Public Library, Municipal Council Badulla
- Anuradhapura Public Library, Anuradhapura Municipal Council
- Addalachenai Public Library, Addalachenai Pradeshiya Sabha
- Amir Ali Public Library, Sammanthurai Pradeshiya Sabha
- Kalmunai Public Library, Kalmunai Municipal Council
- Batticaloa Public Library, Batticaloa Municipal Council
- Jaffna Public Library, Jaffna Municipal Council
- Maharagama Public Library, Maharagama Urban Council
- Seethawakapura Public Library, Avissawella Urban Council
- Kalutara Public Library, Kalutara Urban Council
- Migettuwatte Gunananda Himi Memorial Public Library, Panadura Urban Council
- Horana Public Library, Horana Urban Council
- Katunayake Seeduwa Public Library, Katunayaka-Seeduwa Urban Council
- Peliyagoda Public Library, Peliyagoda Urban Council
- Ja-Ela Public Library, Ja-Ela Urban Council
- Gampola Public Library, Gampola Urban Council
- Nawalapitiya Public Library, Nawalapitiya Urban Council
- Hatton Public Library, Hatton Urban Council
- Ambalangoda Public Library, Ambalangoda Urban Council
- Hikkaduwa Public Library, Hikkaduwa Urban Council
- Weligama Public Library, Weligama Urban Council
- Hambantota Public Library, Hambantota Urban Council
- Tangalle Public Library, Tangalle Urban Council
- Balangoda Public Library, Balangoda Urban Council
- Kegalle Public Library, Kegalle Urban Council
- Haputale Public Library, Haputale Urban Council
- I. W. R. A. Eriyagolla Public Library, Kuliyapitiya Urban Council
- Kurunegala Public Library, Kurunegala Urban Council
- Puttalam Public Library, Puttalam Urban Council
- Halawatha Public Library, Halawatha Urban Council
- Ampara Public Library, Ampara Urban Council
- Trincomalee Public Library, Trincomalee Urban Council
- Mannar Public Library, Mannar Urban Council
- Katthankudi Public Library, Kattankudi Urban Council
- Chavakachcheri Public Library, Chavakacheri Urban Council
- Point Pedro Public Library, Point Pedro Urban Council
- Piliyandala Public Library, Kesbewa Pradeshiya Sabha
- Bandaranayaka Public Library, Homagama Pradeshiya Sabha
- Gnanapradeepa Public Library, Bandaragama Pradeshiya Sabha
- C. W. W. Kannangara Public Library, Mathugama Pradeshiya Sabha
- Pradeepa Central Library, Horana Pradeshiya Sabha
- Delgoda Public Library, Biyagama Pradeshiya Sabha
- Bandaranayaka Memorial Public Library, Minuwangoda Pradeshiya Sabha
- Demanhandiya Public Library, Katana Pradeshiya Sabha
- Dambulla Public Library, Dambulla Pradeshiya Sabha
- Baddegama Public Library, Baddegama Pradeshiya Sabha
- Kamburupitiya Public Library, Kamburupitiya Pradeshiya Sabha
- Beliatta Public Library, Beliatta Pradeshiya Sabha
- Ehaliyagoda Public Library, Ehaliyagoda Pradeshiya Sabha
- Embilipitiya Public Library, Embilipitiya Pradeshiya Sabha
- Yatiyanthota Public Library, Yatityanthota Pradeshiya Sabha
- Mawanella Public Library, Mawanella Pradeshiya Sabha
- Ruwanwella Central Library, Kahatagasthenna Pradeshiya Sabha
- Rambukkana Public Library, Rambukkana Pradeshiya Sabha
- Bandarawela Public Library, Bandarawela Pradeshiya Sabha
- Monaragala Public Library, Monaragala Pradeshiya Sabha
- Buththala Public Library, Buththala Pradeshiya Sabha
- Hettipola Public Library, Panduwasnuwara Pradeshiya Sabha
- Gnanapradeepa Public Library, Pannala Pradeshiya Sabha
- Mawatagama Public Library, Mawatagama Pradeshiya Sabha
- Wennappuwa Public Library, Wennappuwa Pradeshiya Sabha
- Polonnaruwa Public Library, Thamankaduwa Pradeshiya Sabha
- Bandaranayaka Public Library, Hingurakgoda Pradeshiya Sabha
- Kekirawa Public Library, Kekirawa Pradeshiya Sabha
- Kilinochchi Public Library, Karachchi Pradeshiya Sabha
- Uduvil Public Library, Valikamam South Divisional Council
- Nattandiya Public Library, Nattandiya Public Library
- Malimbada Public Library, Malimbada Pradeshiya Sabha

== School libraries ==
- Wajra Jayanthi Library-Rahula College, Matara
- Ananda College, Colombo
- Dharmaraja College, Kandy
- Frank Lee Woodward Library, Mahinda College, Galle
- Mahanama College, Colombo
- Royal College, Colombo
- St Peter's College, Colombo
- St. Sebastian's College, Moratuwa
- S. Thomas' College, Mt Lavinia
- Taxila Central College, Horana
- presidents College, maharagama
- Zahira College, Colombo 10

Ku/Nungamuwa mahavidyalaya, Yatigaloluwa, Polgahawela

Ku/Rathmalgoda Maha Vidyalaya, Polgahawela

== See also ==
- Copyright law of Sri Lanka
- Library associations in Sri Lanka
- List of archives in Sri Lanka
- Mass media in Sri Lanka
