= Choksy =

Choksy is a Zoroastrian surname. Notable people with the surname include:

- Jamsheed Choksy, professor
- Kairshasp Nariman Choksy (1933–2015), Sri Lankan politician
- Nasarvanji Hormusji Choksy (1861–1939), British Indian physician
- Vishtasp Kairshasp Choksy (1969), Sri Lankan lawyer
