= List of archives in Sri Lanka =

This is a List of archives in Sri Lanka

== National ==
- The National Archives of Sri Lanka
- National Museum Library
- National Film, Television and Sound Archives
- National Library of Sri Lanka

== Universities ==
- Permanent Reference Collection, University of Colombo
- University library, University of Moratuwa
- Rajarata University of Sri Lanka
- University of Sri Jayewardenepura
- Library, University of Ruhuna

== See also ==
- List of archives
