= National Institute of Business Management (Sri Lanka) =

Sri Lankan business school

Coordinates: 6°54′22″N 79°52′14″E

- ජාතික ව්‍යාපාර කළමනාකාරීත්ව ආයතනය
- Motto: Powering Great Minds
- Type: Business school
- Established: 1968; 58 years ago
- Affiliations: Coventry University (UK), Limkokwing University of Creative Technology, Kuala Lumpur, Malaysia, Universiti Teknologi Malaysia (UTM)
- Chairman: V K Choksy
- Director: Dr. D.M.A. Kulasooriya
- Location: Colombo, Sri Lanka

The National Institute of Business Management (Sinhala: ජාතික ව්‍යාපාර කළමනාකරණ ආයතනය, romanized: jātika vyāpāra kaḷamanākaraṇa āyatanaya) also known as NIBM, is a self-financing public business school based in Colombo, Sri Lanka functioning as a statutory body under the Ministry of Education, Higher Education and Vocational Education. Furthermore NIBM holds ISO – 9001-2008 certification.

The institute was established in 1968 and offers Graduate, Post Graduate, Executive Education, Diploma and Certificate programmes in the fields of Information Technology, Business Management, Languages, Engineering, and Design. The MBA programme is the flagship programme of the institute and is offered in two year full time. NIBM has collaborated with Coventry University, UK and Limkokwing University, Malaysia in offering degree programmes.

The main campus is located in Colombo 07 and the four regional campuses are located in Galle, Kandy, Kurunegala, and Matara. The National Innovation Centre (NIC) that houses programmes in Design, Humanities, and Data Sciences is located in Kirulapone, Colombo.

The National Institute of Business Management is headed by Dr. Gunathilake Tantirigama as Chairman and Dr. D. M. A. Kulasooriya as Director General.

== History ==
The Management Development & Productivity Centre (MDPC) was established as a means of producing trained and skilled personnel particularly in the field of Management. Based on a proposal submitted to the United Nations Development Programme (UNDP) by the Ministry of Industries, which was overseeing a large number of statutory boards and public corporations, the Management Development & Productivity Centre (MDPC) was established on 16 August 1968, in collaboration with the UNDP and the International Labour Organisation (ILO), which acted as the executing agency of the MDPC. Thus, MDPC became the first ever management training institute of Sri Lanka.

In 1972, the center began to function under the name of National Institute of Management (NIM). NIM commenced its first Diploma programme in 1975 in Business Management and in the following year, the institute was incorporated as the National Institute of Business Management by an Act of Parliament (The National Institute of Business Management Law, No. 23 of 1976). The first Diploma in Computer System Design was inaugurated in the year of 1980.

In the year of 1996, BSc in Management Information Systems was commenced in collaboration with University College Dublin, Ireland. Subsequently, the first convocation ceremony of NIBM was held in the year of 1999.

In 2017, NIBM commenced four Undergraduate Degree programmes in collaboration with Coventry University, UK. In the same year, NIBM established the National Innovation Centre (NIC) in collaboration with Limkokwing University, Malaysia.

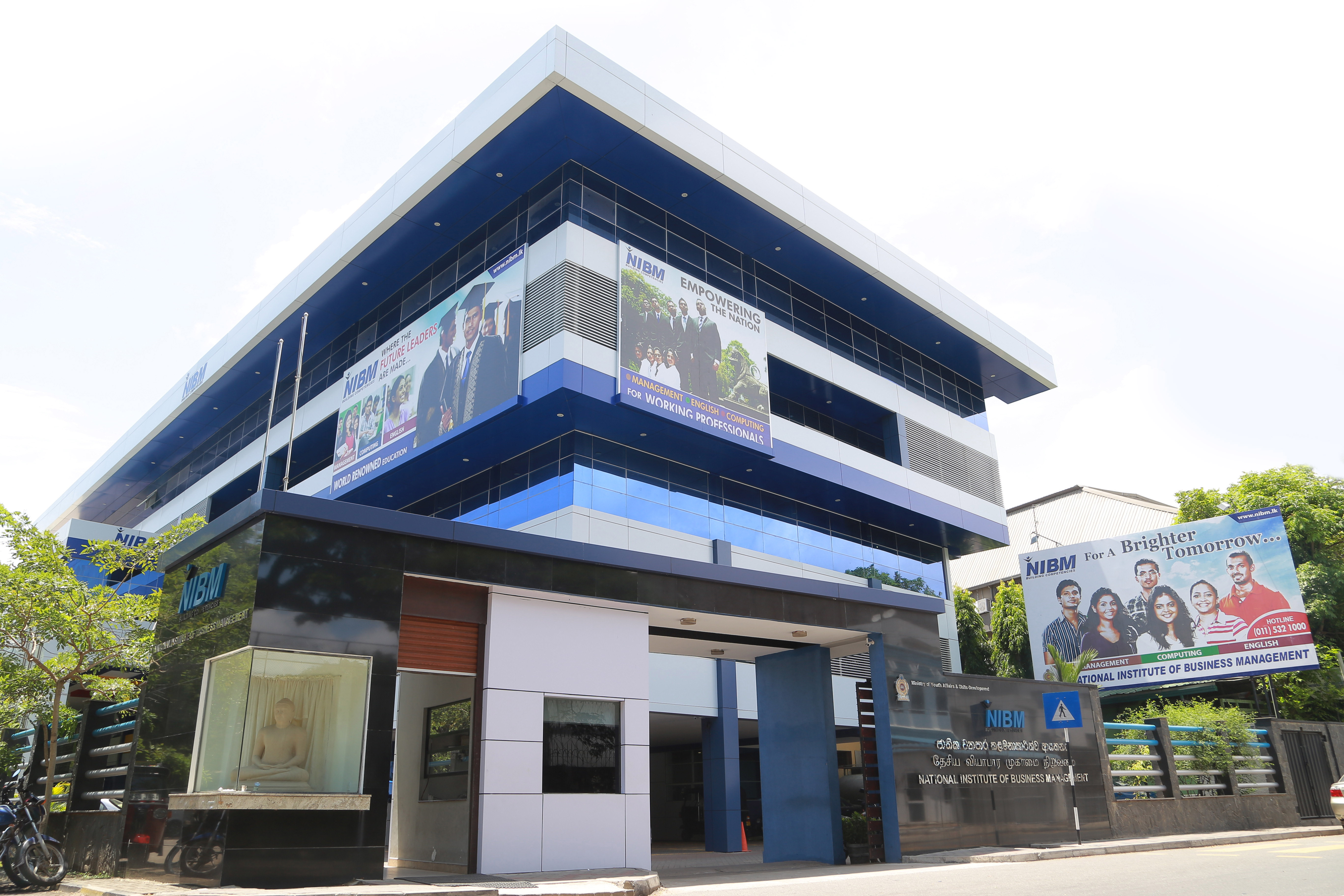
The Main Campus of NIBM - Colombo 07

== Academics ==
NIBM has degree granting, diplomas and certificate programmes in business, computing and engineering, design and languages.

=== School of Business ===
The School of Business is the flagship school of NIBM and functions as a continuation of The Management Development & Productivity Centre (MDPC). Currently it houses close to 5000 students. SOB offers a number of degrees, higher diploma and diploma courses, and Certificate programmes for General Management, Human Resource Management, Productivity and Quality Improvement, Marketing, Finance, Accounting, Project Management, and Logistics Management.

SOB also provides consultancy services, computer application programmes, and tailormade training programmes. Diploma in Business Management offered by SOB is the oldest program of NIBM and is now known as advanced diploma in Business Management (ADBM). The programmes are affiliated with international; universities and recognized from a number of professional bodies.

The School of Business is currently headed by Mr. Kolitha Ranawaka, Director of SOB.

==== Productivity & Quality Centre ====
The Productivity Division that was there from the inception of NIBM was re-introduced in 2018 with a new identity as Productivity & Quality Centre (PQC). The Career Guidance & Industrial Training Unit and the Personal Certification Unit function under PQC.

The Centre provides consultancy services to the industry to improve productivity and quality, facilitates NIBM students to gain internships, and provides personal certifications (ISO 17024:2012) to professionals. PQC maintains a very close relationship with the industry.

The Productivity & Quality Centre is currently headed by Ms. Pavithra Wickramasuriya, Head of PQC.

==== Business Consultancy Unit ====
The Business Consultancy Unit provides consultancy services to businesses. NIBM’s Business Consultancy Unit consists of a team of business consultants from different disciplines.

The Business Consultancy Unit is currently headed by Dr. Himendra Balalle.

=== School of Computing and Engineering (SOCE) ===
The origin of the Management Information Systems Division (MIS) can be traced back to the early 1980s. It was the first division to offer the Bachelor of Science Degree in Information Technology in collaboration with the University College Dublin in 1996. The division was rebranded as the School of Computing and Engineering in 2018 and currently it has over 6000 students. The School offers degree programmes, Higher National Diplomas, Diplomas, Advanced Certificate and Certificate level programmes in Computer Programming, Software Engineering, Web Development, Graphic Designing, Application Packages, Hardware, and Networking. These programmes are conducted for school leavers and IT professionals.

SOCE is a CISCO Networking Academy, a Microsoft Imagine Academy, and a Redhat Academy. In addition, NIBM is an accredited training provider for BCS Agile and Business Analysis Certifications in Sri Lanka. Since August 2018, NIBM is a Pearson VUE Authorized Test Centre.

The School of Computing and Engineering is currently headed by Ms. G. C. Wickramasinghe, Director of SOCE.

The School of Computing and Engineering currently consists of two units: Computer Science Unit and Mathematics and Engineering Unit.

==== Computer Science Unit ====
The Computer Science Unit offers programmes under four specialization areas: Software Engineering, Network Engineering, Management of Information Systems, and Multimedia. In addition to the academic programmes it offers, custom programmes and workshops are conducted for private and public sector organizations. The Computer Science Unit develops industry standard software through the Software Development Unit of NIBM.

==== Software Development Unit (SDU) ====
Software Development Unit, which comes under the Computer Science Unit, was first established in 1988 and the unit is engaged in developing industry standard software for public and private sector organizations. Support services for its clients are also provided by the unit. SDU also provides employment opportunities to students with the intention of giving industry exposure.

==== Mathematics and Engineering Unit ====
The Engineering division offers BSc (Hons.) in Quantity Surveying, Higher Diploma and Diploma in Quantity Surveying, and several other certificate programmes.

=== National Innovation Centre (NIC) ===
The National Innovation Centre (NIC) was created with a strategic partnership agreement with the Limkokwing University of Creative Technology in Malaysia in 2017. NIC is located in Kirulapone and is equipped with a language lab and a Data Analytics Centre.

The National Innovation Centre is currently headed by Mr. Samira Wijayasiri, Director of NIC and SOL.

NIC currently consists of three division: School of Humanities, School of Design, and Data Analytics Centre.

==== School of Humanities (SOH) ====
The School of Humanities offers Diploma programmes, Bachelor’s and Master’s degree programmes in Psychology. It also offers Bachelor’s degrees in Teaching English for Speakers of Other Languages (BA in TESOL) and English Studies (BA in English Studies). A number of certificate programmes in foreign languages (Japanese, French, German, and Chinese) are also offered by the School of Humanities.

==== School of Design (SOD) ====
School of Design at NIC offers degree programmes in disciplines including Fashion Design, Interior Architecture, Broadcasting & Journalism, and Mobile Computing, while Diploma and Certificate courses are offered in a variety of similar subjects including Fashion Design, Fashion Entrepreneurship, Pattern Making, Accessory Design, Fashion Marketing, and Fashion Industry.

==== Data Analytics Centre (DAC) ====
The Data Analytics Centre offers an undergraduate degree programme in Data Science alongside an Advanced Diploma in Data Science. The center is also intended to provide data analytics to industries in Sri Lanka.

=== School of Language (SOL) ===
To cater to the increasing demand for learning English, the English Language Unit was established in the year 2006.

The School of Language conducts Diploma, Certificate, and Professional Certificate programmes in English, German, French, and in other foreign languages designed to enable students to acquire a variety of skills including speaking, business writing, reading, and listening. SOL also conducts workshops, training consultancies, and tailormade training programmes upon requirement.

== Regional Campuses ==
NIBM has four campuses around the island. There are situated in the cities of Kurunegala, Kandy, Galle, and Matara.

=== Kurunegala Regional Campus ===
The regional campus in Kurunegala was established in the year 1996 with the assistance of the Konrad Adenauer Foundation of Germany, the Research Institute for Management (RVB) of the Netherlands, and the Regional Industrial Development Project.

Kurunegala Regional Campus offers a variety of programmes in the fields of Management, IT, and Languages and currently houses close to 700 students. The regional campus in Kurunegala is the first branch of NIBM and is currently headed by Mr. K. P. C. Gunarathna.

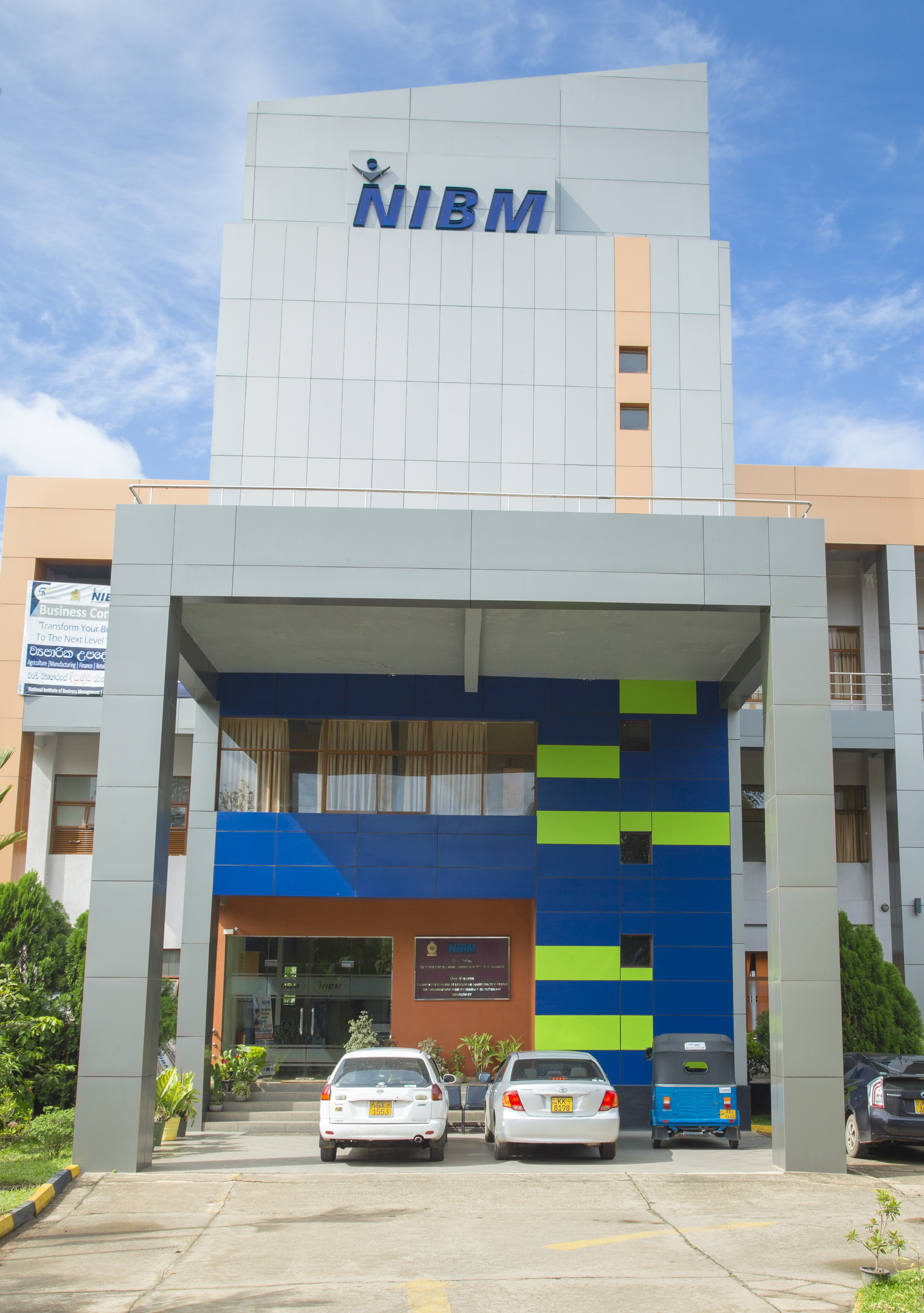
Regional Campus - Kurunegala

=== Kandy Regional Campus ===
The second branch of NIBM was established in Kandy in the year of 1996 in order to cater to the growing demand for training in Management and IT.

Kandy Regional Campus offers programmes in Management, IT, and Languages along with training programmes and workshops. The Degree School of NIBM Kandy located at Getambe will be in operation from April 2021. The branch is currently headed by Mr. Ishan Wiratunga.

=== Southern Campus – Galle/Matara ===
In 2010, the third regional campus of NIBM was established in Galle to cater to the increased needs of Management and IT education in the Southern Province.

The campus offers an array of programmes in IT, Management, and Languages. Matara regional campus was established in 2014 and is managed under the supervision of the Galle Regional Campus. Mr. Thusitha Liyanagamage currently heads the Southern Campus in Galle and Matara.

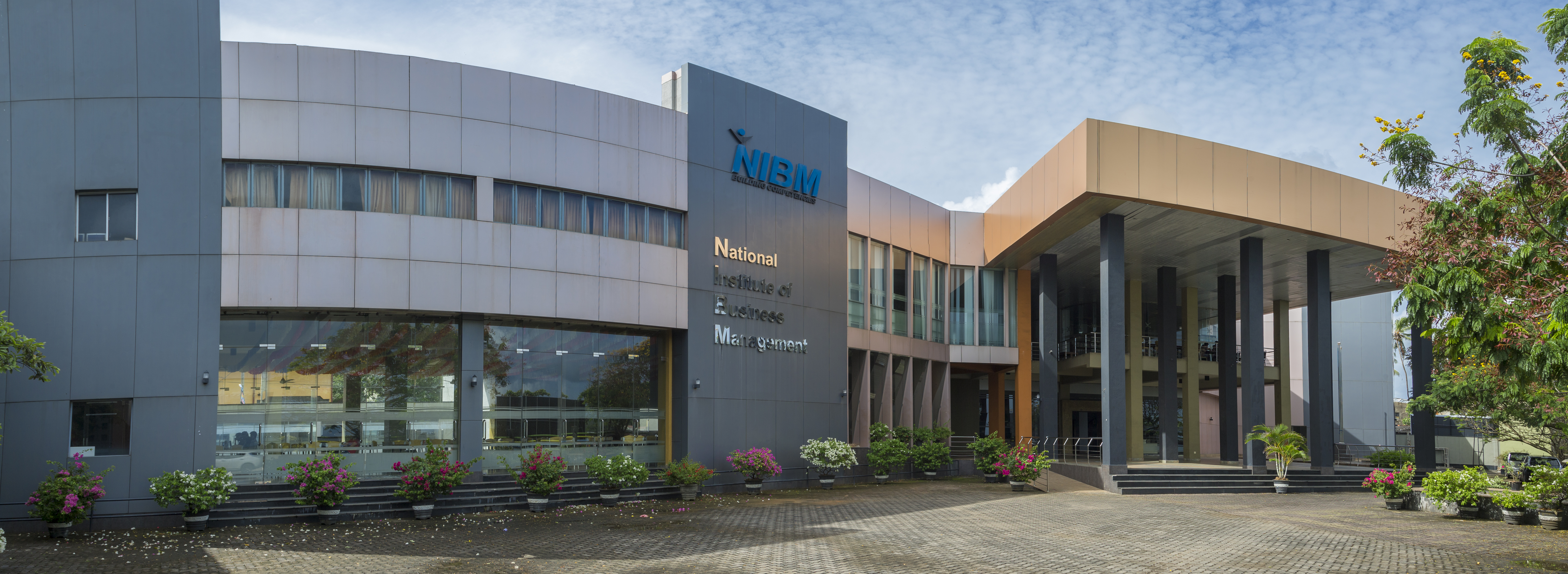
Regional Campus - Galle

=== NIBM Digital Campus (NDC)/ NIBM Virtual University ===
The NIBM Digital Campus is the newest addition to the NIBM family, and is the platform of online education at NIBM.

NDC was established in the year of 2019 under the guidance of Dr. D.M.A. Kulasooriya, Director General of NIBM and under the supervision of Dr. Himendra Balalle, Head of Business Consultancy Unit. NDC is equipped with a Learning Management System (LMS) that encourages students to engage in the learning process with a new experience.

At present, NDC offers a number of foundation and certificate programmes online in Python, Database Management System, Mobile Application Development (Android), TESOL, Business Management, and Business English.

The online platform also allows hybrid assessments exposing students at NIBM to a state-of-the-art learning system.
