= N. K. Choksy =

Ceylonese judge

Nariman Kairshasp Choksy QC

acting Puisne Justice of the Supreme Court of Ceylon
- In office 1951–1951

Nariman Kairshasp Choksy, QC was Ceylonese lawyer and judge. He was an acting Puisne Justice of the Supreme Court of Ceylon.

== Biography ==
Choksy was born in Ceylon to a Bombay Parsi family that had migrated to Colombo from Surat, North of Bombay, in the year 1885 to manage an established business house in the Coconut oil industry at Colombo. He became a proctor in 1917 and in 1923, qualified as an advocate and established a lucrative practice on the civil law, first in the original courts and thereafter in the appellate courts. He was appointed as a King's Counsel in 1947 and appointed as an acting Puisne Justice of the Supreme Court in 1951. He was the Chairman of the Land Acquisition Board of Review from 1950 to 1960 and served as the chairman of the Commission of Inquiry in to Local Government in Ceylon, which published The Choksy Report that was used as a reference for advocating more powers and facilities to local government bodies and which first identified the need for the establishment of a National Library of Sri Lanka. He was the Chairman of Hentley Garments Limited, a director of the Ceylon Glass Factory and President of the Income Tax Payers' Association of Ceylon.

Choksy became the first Parsi to become an advocate and a King's Counsel in Ceylon. He found himself to be a stateless person in 1948 with the enactment of the Ceylon Citizenship Act. He was granted Ceylonese citizenship in 1950 as a Distinguished Citizen under the provisions of the Act No 40 of 1950.

His son K. N. Choksy became the Minister of Finance after a successful legal career, followed by his grandson Vishtasp Kairshasp Choksy.
