= Legal deposit =

Legal requirement on publications

Legal deposit is a legal requirement that mandates individuals or organizations to submit copies of their publications to a designated repository, typically a national library. The number of copies required varies by country. In some jurisdictions, governments are also subject to legal deposit obligations and must provide copies of official documents to publicly accessible libraries. These requirements exist to preserve a nation's published heritage and ensure long-term access to information.

Books in legal depositories in 2018–2020

The legislation governing legal deposit requirements varies by country; in some cases, it is enshrined in copyright law, while in others, it is established through separate legal deposit or library-specific statutes. Until the late 20th century, legal deposit covered only printed and audiovisual materials. However, in the 21st century, most countries have extended their legislation to include digital documents. In 2000, UNESCO published a new and enlarged edition of Jean Lunn's 1981 Guidelines for Legal Deposit Legislation, which addresses the issue of electronic formats in its recommendations for the construction of legal deposit legislation.

The number of books deposited in national legal repositories increased from 2.4 million in 2018 to 2.7 million in 2019, mainly due to a substantial growth in digital deposits.

== By country ==
=== Albania ===
In Albania, section 41–47 of the law "On books in the Republic of Albania" (no. 9616/2006) requires publishers of "printed books, brochures, posters, postal cards, maps, geographic atlases, and musical and choreographical scores" to deposit 5 copies without compensation at the National Library of Albania, the Library of the Albanian Parliament, and the local public library of the municipality the publisher operates in. Each new printing is subject to the same conditions.

=== Australia ===
In Australia, section 201 of the Copyright Act 1968 and other state acts requires that a copy of all materials published in Australia be deposited with the National Library of Australia. State laws require books and a wide range of other materials published in each state to be deposited in the applicable state library. New South Wales, Queensland and South Australia also require books published in those states to be deposited in the library of the state parliament. New South Wales law also requires books published in that state to be deposited in the University of Sydney library.

The relevant legislation governing deposit of items to state and territory libraries are: the Publications (Legal Deposit) Act 2004 (NT); the Libraries Act 1988 (Qld), the Libraries Act 1984 (Tas), Section 35 of the Libraries Act 1982 (SA), the Libraries Act 1939 (NSW), Section 49 of the Libraries Act 1988 (Vic), and the Legal Deposit Act 2012 (WA) The Australian Capital Territory (ACT) has no local legislation as of May 2020, but publishers "are encouraged to lodge a copy of their publications with the ACT Heritage Library for ongoing preservation and access".

The Copyright Act 1968 and legal deposit legislation pertaining to each state mandates that publishers of any kind must deposit copies of their publications in the National Library of Australia as well as in the state or territory library in their jurisdiction. Until the 21st century, this has applied to all types of printed materials (and in some states, to audio-visual formats as well). On 17 February 2016, the federal legal deposit provisions were extended (by Statute Law Revision Act (No. 1) 2016) to cover electronic publications of all types. By July 2018, while the Northern Territory was the only jurisdiction with legislation with explicit mention of "internet publications" (in its Publications (Legal Deposit) Act 2004), Queensland's Libraries Act 1988 and Tasmania's Libraries Act 1984 were broad enough to include digital publications. Most states and territories have been reviewing or amending existing legislation to extend to digital publications as well. The State Library of South Australia requires that electronic publications should be deposited rather than print whenever possible". In June 2019, New South Wales passed new legislation, the Library Amendment Act 2019, which amended the Library Act 1939 and repealed previous legal deposit legislation, the Copyright Act 1879 (NSW). The change means that legal deposit now applies to all formats, including digital.

Under the legislation (section 195CD (1) (c) (i)), publishers are required to deposit digital publications without technological protection measures (TPM) or digital rights management (DRM); that is, the copy must contain all content and functionality, without protection measures such as password protection or subscription paywalls.

=== Austria ===
The Media Act, first enacted in 1981 and updated in 2026, mandates that one to three copies (as determined by specific regulation) of all print media and periodical electronic media published in Austria must be submitted by the copyright holder to the Austrian National Library, to certain academic, research, or special libraries required in specific circumstances, and to the Library of Parliament and Federal Chancellery Library if requested.

=== Brazil ===
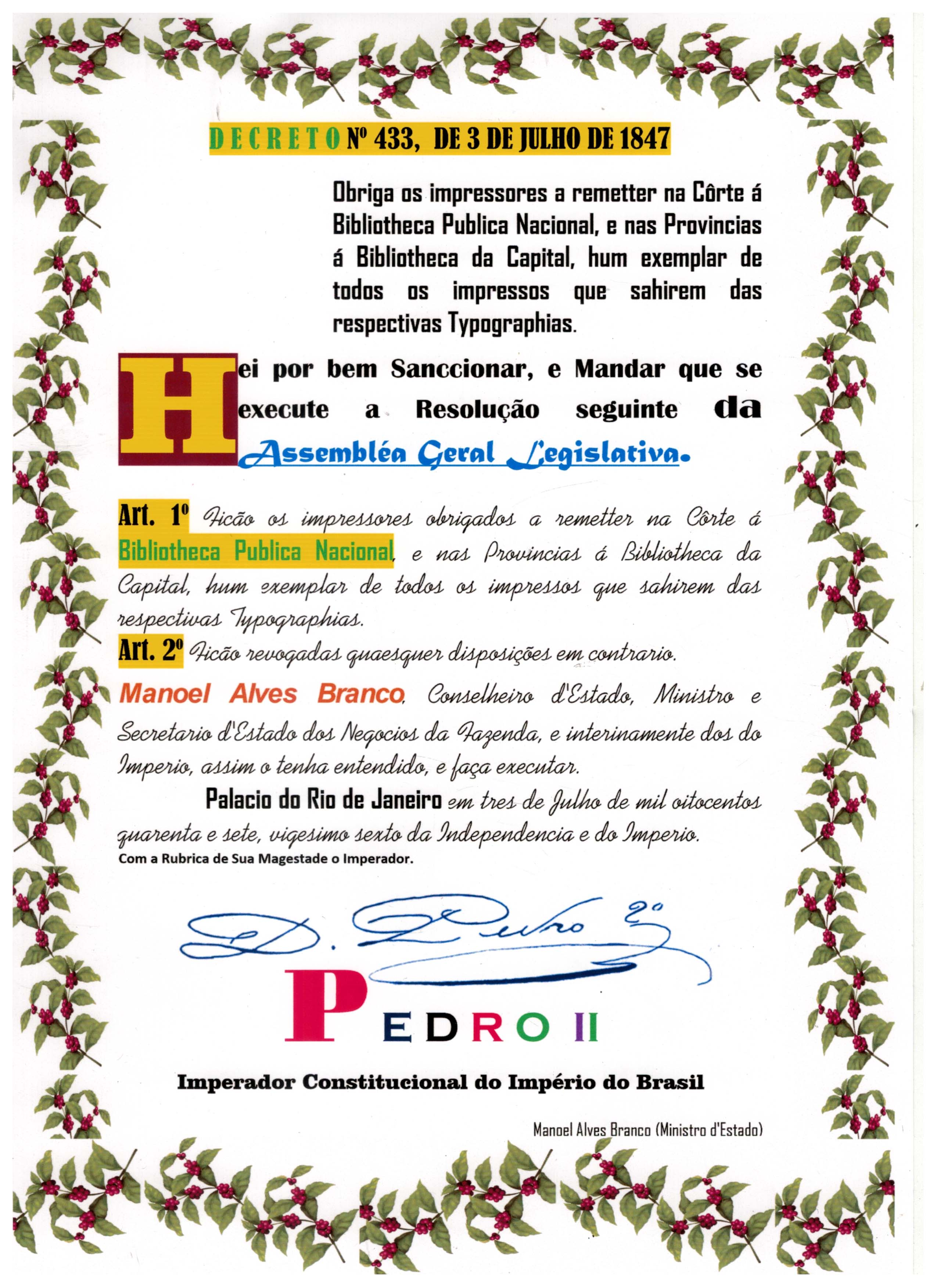
Law of legal deposit of Pedro II in 1847

Legal deposit legislation in Brazil ("Depósito legal"), federal laws number 10994 and 12192, requires that one copy of every book, music or periodical published in the country be sent to the National Library of Brazil (known as Biblioteca Nacional, Biblioteca do Rio de Janeiro, or Fundação Biblioteca Nacional), located in the city of Rio de Janeiro.

=== Brunei ===
Under the Preservation of Books Act (1967, revised in 1984), three copies of every "book, report, pamphlet, periodical, newspaper, sheet of letterpress, sheet of music, map, plan, chart or table separated published" shall be delivered to the Director of Museums within one month after the publication at one's own expense.

=== Canada ===
In Canada, the Library and Archives of Canada Act (2004) specifies that up to two copies of any published material must be deposited with Library and Archives Canada. Materials deposited in the archives are catalogued; the catalogs are available as part of the Library and Archives Canada website. The province of Quebec also requires deposit of two copies of any document be deposited to Bibliothèque et Archives nationales du Québec within seven days of its publication.

=== China ===
In China, Article 22 of Regulations on the Administration of Publication (2001) states that three copies of each printed publication should be submitted to the National Library of China, one copy to the Archives Library of Chinese Publications and one copy to the administrative department for publication under the State Council.

=== Colombia ===
In Colombia, the law of legal deposit is regulated by Law 44 of 1993, the statutory Decree 460 of March 16 of 1999, and Decree 2150 of 1995. These laws and decrees are specifically about the National Library of Colombia. The creators of printed works, as well as audiovisual, audio, and video productions, should supply the library with a specified number of copies of the works, whether they were produced within the Colombian territory or imported.

- For printed works, two copies of each of the works produced within the national territory should be delivered to the National Library of Colombia; one copy to the Biblioteca del Congreso de la República de Colombia (Library of the Congress of the Republic of Colombia), and one copy to the Central Library of the Universidad Nacional de Colombia (National University of Colombia), excepting a few cases in which the high cost of the edition or the short duration of publication makes it possible to deliver fewer copies.
- For audiovisual and audio works, as well as for published works that have been imported, only one copy needs to be delivered to the National Library.

=== Costa Rica ===
The National Library of Costa Rica is obliged by law ("Printing Law and Copyright [Author Rights Law] and Related Rights Law") to hold three copies of every publication in the country.

=== Croatia ===
In Croatia, legal deposit was established in 1816. Today, it is regulated by the Libraries Act, which stipulates nine copies should be supplied by the publishers. Of these, two are received by the National and University Library in Zagreb, while university and scientific libraries in Osijek, Rijeka, Pula, Zadar, Split, Dubrovnik and Mostar receive one copy each.

=== Denmark ===
In Denmark, legal deposit has been required since 1697, and is handled by the Royal Danish Library (for most written works) and by the State and University Library (for newspapers, audio, and video); two copies must be supplied. This also includes works in digital format, and the publisher may be required to supply the necessary passwords.

=== Faroe Islands ===
Legal deposit of four copies of every publication is required to the National Library of the Faroe Islands under a law passed on July 16, 1952.

=== Finland ===
In Finland, The Royal Academy of Turku was given right to receive a copy of all works published in Sweden in 1707. After Finland had been ceded by Sweden to Russia, this privilege was confirmed in 1809. In 1820, all Russian print presses began to send legal deposit copies to Finland.

Gaining its independence in 1917, Finland retained the principles of legal deposit. Helsinki University Library (the university had been transferred from Turku in 1827) remained the main deposit library. Additional copies began to be deposited in other libraries in Turku, Jyväskylä, and Vyborg (later Oulu). In 1984, the obligation to deposit was expanded to audiovisual materials; responsibility to preserve films was given to the National Audiovisual Institute.

A new act on depositing and preservation of cultural materials was given in 2007. The new act covers two new important types of cultural materials. The National Audiovisual Archive collects and preserves broadcast materials, whereas the National Library of Finland (Helsinki University Library renamed) takes care of capturing and preserving Web content.

=== France ===
In France, legal deposit was initiated by the Ordonnance de Montpellier of 1537, under which a copy of any published book had to be delivered to the king's library, for conservation purposes. During the following centuries, legal deposit was sometimes used to facilitate censorship and the obligation was thus removed briefly during the French Revolution, under the argument that it violated freedom of speech. The main depository is the Bibliothèque nationale de France. Legal deposit is extremely developed and concerns not only printed material but also multimedia archives and even some web pages.

France is also unique in the world in funding the Osmothèque, a legal deposit scent and fragrance archive to preserve perfume formulas.

=== Germany ===
In Germany, since 1913 publishing houses bound by a contract with the booksellers' guild, the Börsenverein des Deutschen Buchhandels, were required to send a so-called Pflichtexemplar of each book in print and stock to the Deutsche Bücherei in Leipzig. After World War II, Deutsche Bücherei kept going in East Germany, while the Deutsche Bibliothek was founded in Frankfurt am Main, West Germany. Legal deposits kept being required strictly by Private Law, organised by the Börsenverein and the German booksellers. Since 1969, the German National Library Law (Gesetz über die Deutsche Bibliothek vom 31. März 1969, BGBl. I S. 265) required that two copies of each print publication and of some non-print publications be sent to the German National Library in either Frankfurt am Main or Leipzig (depending on the publisher's location). The act was replaced in 2006 by the German National Library Act, as the German National Library, or Deutsche Nationalbibilothek, was founded. Additionally, each federal state of Germany requires that one or two copies of works published in that state be deposited in the respective state repository.

=== Hong Kong ===
Under section 3 of the Books Registration Ordinance the publisher of a new book shall, within one month after the book is published, printed, produced or otherwise made in Hong Kong, deliver to the Secretary for Broadcasting, Culture and Sport free of charge five copies of the book.

A person who contravenes such requirement shall be guilty of an offence and shall be liable on conviction to a fine of HK$2000.

The secretary is required to send one copy to the City Hall Library, which was the main library of the previous Urban Council or such other library as he may approve.

This requirement did not include any library under the previous Regional Council (another municipal council in Hong Kong), and was not amended since the Hong Kong Central Library was open and replaced the City Hall Library as the main library for the whole territory.

=== Hungary ===
Six copies of all print and electronic media published in Hungary must be submitted to the appropriate national repository. Printed works are deposited at the Hungarian National Library, video materials go to the Hungarian National Film Archive, and radio and television broadcast media are sent to the National Audiovisual Archive.

=== Iceland ===
In Iceland, four copies of any published, printed material must be sent to the National and University Library of Iceland in Reykjavík, three of which will be kept there, and one of which will be kept at Amtsbókasafnið á Akureyri in Akureyri. If fewer than 50 copies are made only two are required.

=== India ===
The Delivery of Books Act 1954 enacted by the Indian parliament regulates the deposit of books published in India to four National Depository Centres, including the National Library of India, Kolkata; Connemara Public Library, Chennai; Central Library, Mumbai and the Delhi Public Library. The Act was amended in 1956 to include periodicals and newspapers. The Indian National Bibliography is compiled on the receipt of books received under Delivery of Books Act at the National Library, Kolkata.

=== Ireland ===
One copy of each book and periodical published in the Republic of Ireland must be deposited with the National Library of Ireland (NLI), the British Library, and each of the seven university libraries: Trinity College Library and those of the University of Limerick (UL), Dublin City University (DCU), and the four constituent universities of the National University of Ireland (NUI). Four other British libraries can submit a written request for a copy within a year: the Bodleian Library, Cambridge University Library, the National Library of Scotland and the National Library of Wales. Irish publishers have complained at the obligation to supply up to 13 free copies of works which may have a small print run. Trinity College Library incurs expense, partly reimbursed from public funds, in receiving UK books and acting as a clearing house for Irish books sent for UK deposit.

The Irish Free State in 1922 inherited the UK's Copyright Act 1911 (1 & 2 Geo. 5. c. 46), which made Trinity College Library and those in the UK the legal deposits for UK-published books. When the Free State's first copyright law was debated in 1927, it was decided to retain Trinity College Library rather than the NLI as the deposit for UK books, on the grounds of continuity. It retains the status as of 2016. Originally the 1927 bill proposed only to add the NLI as a deposit for Free State publishing; in committee the three then constituent colleges of the NUI were added as well, while status of the lesser British libraries was reduced from automatic to by request. St Patrick's College (predecessor of NUI Maynooth) was added in 1963, and UL and DCU in 1989 on promotion to university status. In 2000, the deposit requirement was extended to e-publishing, and libraries could request digital copies in addition to hard copies. In 2017, the NLI began a consultation on extending legal deposit to born-digital resources, which it had begun preserving in 2011 from voluntary deposits.

=== Israel ===
In Israel, "The Books Law 2000 (5761)" requires two copies of each publication to be sent to the National Library of Israel. The library of the Knesset and the Israel State Archive are each entitled to receive one copy upon request.

The government authorities are required by the "Freedom of Information Act, 1999" to send an annual report of their actions to the public library of every town with 5,000 people or more.

=== Italy ===
In Italy, the law on legal deposit (15 April 2004, n. 106) requires a copy of each publication to be sent to both the National Central Library of Florence and National Central Library of Rome, as it has been since the institution of the Kingdom of Italy (1861).

In addition, the regions determine local regional and provincial legal deposit libraries, which receive two more copies and often inherit that status from their pre-unification history. For instance, the Biblioteca Nazionale Braidense is the legal deposit library in Lombardy since 1788 (when it covered the Duchy of Milan) and the National Central Library of Florence since 1743 (for the Grand Duchy of Tuscany).

=== Japan ===
The legal deposit requirements for Japan's National Diet Library are specified in Chapters X through XI-3 of the National Diet Library Law. These requirements vary based on whether the publishing entity is governmental or nongovernmental, and on whether the work is published physically or online. Required works are books, pamphlets, serials, music scores, maps, films, other documents or charts, phonographic records, and digital text, images, sounds, or programs. Nongovernmental publishers must submit a single copy, and are entitled to "compensation equivalent to the expenses usually required for the issue and deposit of the publication;" noncompliance is subject to a fine.

=== Kenya ===
In Kenya, the legal deposit regulation is covered under the Books and Newspaper Act Cap. 111 of 1960. It covers books (any volume), encyclopaedia, magazines, review, gazette, pamphlet, leaflet, sheet of letterpress, sheet of music, map, plan and chart. However, it gives exceptions to letter heading, price list, annual reports, trade circular, trade advertisement, government publications, legal, trade or business document. The Acts gives the mandate to Kenya National Library Service and the Registrar of Books and Newspapers. According to the Act, publishers should deposit two copies with the Director, Kenya National Library Service and not more than three copies to the Registrar of Books and Newspapers as it may be specified. The regulations were last reviewed in the year 2002 where penalties were specified for non-compliance.

=== Liechtenstein ===
The Liechtenstein State Library, colloquially known as the State Library, was formally established by law by the National Library Foundation in 1961. The State Library possesses a legal depository. As per the amended statutes, the roles of the State Library changed as such: the State Library now functions as a national library as well as a scientific and public library. As a national library, the State Library collects print materials, pictures and music created by citizens of Liechtenstein as well as items related to Liechtenstein. Also, the State Library acts as a patent library for the Principality of Liechtenstein and as such provides access to comprehensive international patent information. The State Library's rules and regulations must follow the current legislation under Liechtenstein's European Economic Area as well as Swiss legislation.

=== Macau ===
Decree-Law No. 72/89/M requires that copies of works published in Macau be deposited with the Macao Central Library.

=== Malaysia ===
In Malaysia, according to the Akta Penyerahan Bahan Perpustakaan 1986 (Deposit of Library Material Act 1986), five copies of printed library materials including books, printed materials, maps, charts and posters must be deposited to the National Library of Malaysia. In addition, two copies of non-printed library materials must also be deposited.

=== Mexico ===
In Mexico, the General Library Law states that two specimens of each physical book, publication, magazine, newspaper, map, brochure, poster, music sheet, record, movie or photograph published should be donated to each of the following libraries: National Library of Mexico, Biblioteca de México José Vasconcelos, Library of the Congress of Mexico, or one specimen if in electronic or digital format.

=== Monaco ===
In Monaco four copies of locally produced books, computer software and media must be deposited in the Bibliothèque Louis Notari. If fewer than 100 copies were produced only two copies are required.

=== New Zealand ===
Legal deposit was initiated in 1903 in New Zealand, and currently requires that copies of all printed documents and offline electronic documents (e.g. DVDs) be sent to the National Library of New Zealand within 20 working days of publication. It also empowers the National Librarian to make copies of Internet documents including websites. If asked for assistance in making copies of their Internet documents, publishers must comply within 20 working days. This process is given legal force by Part 4 of the National Library of New Zealand (Te Puna Mātauranga o Aotearoa) Act 2003, as well as three supporting requirements notices. If more than 100 copies are printed in total, two copies must be provided, otherwise one. If the price of one copy is greater than $1,000 NZD, only one copy is required.

=== Norway ===
Publications in Norway, "regardless of the format of publication", including digital documents, must be deposited with the National Library of Norway.

=== Poland ===
Since 1780 the Załuski Library has been entitled to a copy of all works published in Poland. In modern times the issue is regulated by Dziennik Ustaw nr 29 poz. 161: Rozporządzenie Ministra Kultury i Sztuki z dnia 6 marca 1997 r. w sprawie wykazu bibliotek uprawnionych do otrzymywania egzemplarzy obowiązkowych poszczególnych rodzajów publikacji oraz zasad i trybu ich przekazywania [Journal of Laws no. 29 pos. 161: Decree of the Minister of Culture and Art from 1997-03-06 regarding receiving legal deposits based on type and the rules and mode of deposit.] (PDF) (in Polish). 1997-03-06.

For software and traditional publications with a print run of up to 100 copies, the National Library of Poland and the Jagiellonian Library must receive one copy each, which are to be stored indefinitely. For publications with a larger run, they receive two copies, and 13 other libraries receive one, to be stored for no less than 50 years: library of the Maria Curie-Skłodowska University, library of the University of Łódź, Nicolaus Copernicus University Library, library of the Adam Mickiewicz University in Poznań, University of Warsaw Library, library of the University of Wrocław, Silesian Library, City of Warsaw Library, Pomeranian Library in Szczecin, library of the University of Gdańsk, library of the Catholic University of Lublin, library of the University of Opole, and Podlaskie Library in Białystok.

The Sejm Library additionally receives a copy of all legal documents. Film productions are sent only to the National Film Library (Filmoteka Narodowa).

Legal deposits are handled free of charge by the Polish Post. Failure to provide a legal deposit is penalised by fine.

=== Portugal ===
In Portugal, all publishers are currently required to deposit 11 copies of all publications, which are distributed between the National Library of Portugal, municipal libraries of major cities, and the libraries of public institutions of science and higher learning. Special exceptions, of which only one copy is required (and stored in the National Library), include Masters and PhD dissertations, limited prints, stamps, plans, posters, among others.

=== Romania ===
In Romania, all publishers are required to deposit copies of publications at the National Library of Romania. For books and brochures the minimum requirement is 7 copies. For periodicals, school manuals and audiovisual publications, the legal deposit is 6 copies while for sheet music, atlases and maps the minimum requirement is 3 copies. Also, for PhD theses, the legal deposit is 1 copy.

=== Russia ===
In Russia the Russian State Library (Moscow), the National Library of Russia (St Petersburg), the Library of the Russian Academy of Sciences (St Petersburg), the State Public Scientific & Technological Library (Novosibirsk) as well as the libraries of the Moscow State University, the President of the Russian Federation, and the two Houses of the Federal Assembly of the Russian Federation are entitled to a copy of every book published.

=== Singapore ===
In Singapore, the National Library Board Act requires all publishers in Singapore to deposit two copies of every publication to the National Library Board at their own expense within four weeks from the publication date.

=== Slovenia ===
The forerunner of the National and University Library of Slovenia, the Lyceum Library of Ljubljana was established around 1774 by a decree issued by Maria Theresa from the remains of the Jesuit Library and several monastery libraries. The submission of legal deposit copies to the Lyceum library became mandatory with a decree published by the Austrian court in 1807, at first only in Carniola, except for a short period of French occupation, when it received copies from all the Illyrian provinces. In 1919, it was named State Reference Library and started to collect legal deposit copies from the Slovenia of the time. In the same year, the University of Ljubljana (the first Slovenian university) was established and the library served its needs too. In 1921, it started to acquire legal deposit copies from the entire Kingdom of Yugoslavia. It was named the University Library in 1938. Digitalna knjižnica Slovenije (Digital library of Slovenia) is a project of the National and University Library of Slovenia.

=== South Africa ===
In South Africa the Legal Deposit Act, 1997 requires publishers to provide five copies of every book published, if the print run consists of 100 or more copies. These copies must be deposited in the National Library of South Africa (NLSA) in Cape Town, the NLSA in Pretoria, the Mangaung Library Services in Bloemfontein, the Msunduzi Municipal Library in Pietermaritzburg, and the Library of Parliament in Cape Town. If the print run is less than 100 copies, then only one copy is required, to be deposited in the NLSA in Cape Town. If it is less than 20 copies, then no deposit is required.

For films, videos and sound recordings, the requirements are the same, except that the National Film, Video and Sound Archives (NFVSA) receives a deposit copy instead of the Library of Parliament, and if only one copy is required it is deposited in the NFVSA rather than the NLSA.

=== South Korea ===
Article 20 of the Library Act requires that one or two copies of any tangible material published or produced in the country be sent to the National Library of Korea within 30 days for permanent preservation. Copies of online materials must be submitted on demand.

=== Spain ===
In Spain, the obligation to deposit copies of printed materials has existed since 1619 for the Royal Library of El Escorial and since 1716 for the Royal Library of Madrid (later the National Library of Spain). From this moment, there followed multiple provisions, in the 19th century termed "legal deposit", all with the aim of enforcing compliance.

The decree of 1957 established a solid administrative base for legal deposit in Spain, based on the separation between provincial offices that managed legal deposit at the local level and conservation libraries, such as the National Library. The decree stipulated that printers were responsible for depositing several copies of all published works at the National Library and other public libraries. This legal deposit legislation covered a wide range of materials, including printed materials such as books and magazines, sound recordings, maps, movies, and postcards.

The 1957 decree, though superseded by other decrees in 1971 and 1973, remained almost intact until 2011, when a new legal deposit law was passed on July 29, 2011. Law 23/2011 established, among other things, that the publisher, not the printer, was the primary entity responsible for submitting its materials to legal deposit. It also established procedures for the legal deposit of electronic materials, including online ones. The number of copies that must be delivered to each library varies between two and four according to the type of material. Through legal deposit, the National Library collects all materials published in Spain. The central libraries for each autonomous community collect works published in their respective communities, and provincial libraries collect works published in their respective provinces.

=== Sri Lanka ===
First legal deposit of Sri Lanka was established in 1885 at the National Museum Library. The law of the country (according to National Archives Act No. 48 of 1973). requires that a copy of every document printed in the country has to be deposited in the legal deposit. There are five legal deposits in the country. These are the National Archives of Sri Lanka, the National Library of Sri Lanka, the National Museum Library, the University of Peradeniya library and the Library, University of Ruhuna.

=== Sweden ===
The Swedish Legal Deposit Act originates in 1661. According to present legislation, copies of printed material, sound and moving images has to be sent to The National Library of Sweden and Lund University Library (no audiovisual material). In 2012 the Legal Deposit Act for Electronic Material was passed. It states that starting in 2015, publishing companies and public authorities must deliver digitally published content to the National Library. In 2013-14 electronic legal deposits will start in a smaller scale.

=== Switzerland ===
There is no federal law establishing legal deposit in Switzerland, however, the cantons of Vaud, Fribourg, Geneva, and Ticino have enacted legal deposit laws applying to books published within their respective jurisdictions. On a national level, the Swiss National Library (SNL) has voluntary agreements in place with the two main publishers' associations in the country; Schweizer Buchhandels- und Verlags-Verband, and Association Suisse des Diffuseurs, Editeurs et Libraires, under which the SNL receives a copy of every book published by associated publishers.

=== Taiwan ===
In Taiwan, the Library Act requires that a copy of a work should be deposited with the National Central Library and the Parliamentary Library of the Legislative Yuan. There are only two university library selected as Legal deposit destination — National Dong Hwa University Library and National Taiwan University Library.

=== United Kingdom ===
There are six legal deposit libraries under UK law: the British Library, the National Library of Scotland, the National Library of Wales, the Bodleian Library at Oxford University, Cambridge University Library, and Trinity College Dublin Library. Although the Irish Free State left the UK in 1922, Trinity College remains a UK deposit library, and the UK libraries reciprocally retain deposit rights for Irish publications.

Legal deposit in the United Kingdom traces its origins to an agreement between Sir Thomas Bodley and the Stationers' Company that copies of new books would be added to the Bodleian collection. The Statute of Anne (1710) formalised the practice by extending it, in England, to the Royal Library (now the British Library), Cambridge University, and the library of Sion College, and, in Scotland, to the Advocates Library and the universities of St. Andrews, Edinburgh, Glasgow and Aberdeen. After the Union with Ireland, an 1801 act extended deposit to Trinity College and King's Inns in Dublin. From 1814, publishers supplied institutions upon request rather than automatically. In 1836, Sion College, King's Inns, and the Scottish universities were removed from the list, compensated with a book stipend equal to the average annual value of books deposited over the preceding three years. The Copyright Act 1911 (1 & 2 Geo. 5. c. 46) gave limited deposit rights to the National Library of Wales, with full rights coming in 1987. The Advocates Library's right was transferred to the National Library of Scotland upon its 1925 creation.

The Legal Deposit Libraries Act 2003 restates section 15 of the Copyright Act 1911 (1 & 2 Geo. 5. c. 46), that one copy of every book (which includes pamphlets, magazines, newspapers, sheet music and maps) published there must be sent to the British Library. The other five deposit libraries are entitled to request a free copy within one year of publication, a process which they normally coordinate jointly through Agency for the Legal Deposit Libraries. The 2003 Act sets out provisions for the deposit of non-print works. This legislation was updated with the introduction of secondary legislation, The Legal Deposit Libraries (Non-Print Works) Regulations 2013, which make provision for the legal deposit of works published online or offline in formats other than print, such as websites, blogs, e-journals and CD-ROMs. Social media content is included in the legislation, but not private message sent via social media platforms. Pure video streaming websites are also excluded from the legislation.

In the United Kingdom, the purpose of legal deposits is to "preserve knowledge and information for future generations and 'maintain the national published archive of the British Isles'. The purpose and intent for preserving publications for national posterity applied to other countries as well, including the United States. According to Thomas Lidman, "[l]egal deposit is the foundation on which to build national library services, it helps to ensure that the country's intellectual heritage will be preserved and available for study".

=== United States ===
In the United States, the Copyright Act requires that any copyrighted and published work must be submitted in two copies to the United States Copyright Office at the Library of Congress. The Library of Congress does not retain all works. This mandatory deposit is not required to possess copyright of unpublished works, but a copyright registration can give an author enhanced remedies in case of a copyright violation. This optional registration also requires depositing two copies of the work and therefore also satisfies mandatory deposit requirements. If a foreign publisher distributes works in the US, they must also comply with the mandatory requirements.

In August 2023, the United States Court of Appeals for the District of Columbia Circuit ruled in Valancourt Books v. Garland that the mandatory deposit requirement is an unconstitutional violation of property rights. The separate deposit requirement to optionally register copyright, however, remains in place.

Another type of depository library in the United States are federal depository libraries, which are entitled to free copies of all materials (digital, print, microform, etc.) published by the Government Publishing Office. By accepting these materials, the libraries commit to providing free public access to the depository collection, and they agree to hold the materials for no fewer than five years (with some exceptions); large "regional" depositories also commit to holding these materials indefinitely. There are currently 1,114 such depository libraries in the United States, though the number of federal publications each receives varies based upon their selection profile. This Federal Depository Library Program (FDLP) is not affiliated with the Library of Congress and should not be confused with the aforementioned copyright deposit program.

== See also ==
- Institutional repository – Archive of publications by an institution's staff
