= Ordonnance de Montpellier =

The Ordonnance de Montpellier, signed on 28 December 1537 by Francis I of France, established the first legal deposit system.

Previously, on 13 January 1535, Francis I had banned all printing following the Affair of the Placards. This decree was later repealed, but concern about errant religious teachings remained. In the Ordonnance, Francis decreed that no book be sold in France until a copy was deposited in his library. The Ordonnance was one of about 140 acts signed by the king during his stay in Montpellier from 21 December 1537 to 17 January 1538. In context, the law would control the spread of ideas, particularly heretical religious beliefs. Vague and ineffective, the decree was not widely followed and the legal deposit requirement was abolished in the French Revolution.

== See also ==
- List of libraries in France
