= R. G. Anthonisz =

Richard Gerald Anthonisz, ISO, JP (22 October 1852 – 3 January 1930) was a Ceylonese lawyer, educationist and civil servant. He was the first Government Archivist in the British Administration of Ceylon.

He was born in Galle and received is primary education in English from The Galle School the present Richmond College. Winning the Queen’s Scholarship he entered the Colombo Academy (now Royal College Colombo). Entering the field of law Anthonisz became a Proctor of the District Court.

He thereafter became a teacher and served as the Head Master at Richmond College, Galle and at the Colombo Academy; before becoming the head master of the English Galle Central School. Joining the government service, he became a registrar of lands, then a police magistrate and thereafter became the Assistant Registrar General in Colombo.

A keen student of Dutch history and culture in Ceylon, in July 1899 Anthonisz was appointed to the new post of Examiner of Dutch Records, with the task of searching and organizing the scattered records and documents of the Dutch administration. With successful archive process of Dutch records, a new post of Government Archivist and Librarian was created by the British administration as part of the Chief Secretaries Office (also known as the Colonial Secretary) in 1902 and Anthonisz was made a permanent appointment. He held the post until his retirement in 1921. This office was formally established as the Department of the Government Archivist in 1947 and now known as the Department of National Archives.

For his government service he was appointment as a Justice of the Peace and made a Companion of the Imperial Service Order in the 1919 Birthday Honours. He was made a member of the Society of Dutch Literature, Leyden and the founder of the Dutch Burgher Union of Ceylon.
