= National Depository Centre =

Type of public library in India

A National Depository Centre is type of public library in India which receives a copy of all books, newspapers and periodicals published in the country with ISBN and ISSN as the case may be. There are four centres:

- Connemara Public Library in Chennai
- Central Library, Asiatic Society of Bombay in Mumbai
- National Library, Kolkata
- Delhi Public Library, Delhi

== History ==
The centres were created by the Delivery of Books and Newspapers (Public Libraries) Act of 1954, based on the concept of legal deposit. The Indian National Bibliography is based on all content consolidated by this system.

== See also ==
- Legal deposit in India
- Book publishing in India
