= Biblioteca Nacional "Miguel Obregón Lizano" =

La Biblioteca Nacional “Miguel Obregon Lizano”

- Costa Rica National library in 2018
- Location: San José, Costa Rica
- Established: 1888

Collection
- Legal deposit: yes

Other information
- Website: www.sinabi.go.cr

La Biblioteca Nacional "Miguel Obregón Lizano", also known as the Biblioteca Nacional de Costa Rica (transl. National Library of Costa Rica) is the national library of Costa Rica in San José. It is tasked with curating the cultural heritage of Costa Rica and maintains three copies of every book ever published in the country in addition to other works. The library contains study areas and a reference desk but is not a public lending library. The library is located adjacent to the Parque Nacional, placing it in the center of many important government buildings.

The library was created in 1888 absorbing the collection of the University of St. Thomas that had closed in 1885.

National library of Costa Rica (Biblioteca Nacional "Miguel Obregón Lizano") in 1989

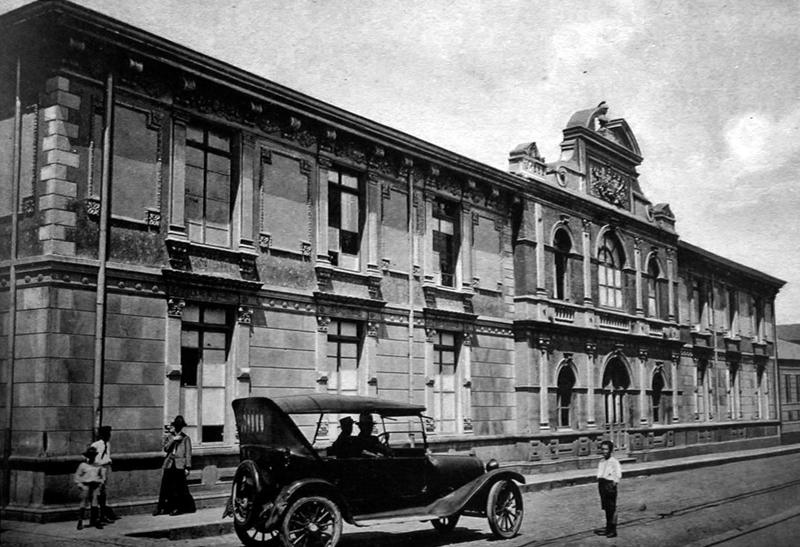
Ancient building of the National Library
