= Delhi Public Library =

Indian Public Library

- Location: Delhi, India
- Type: Public
- Established: 27 October 1951; 74 years ago
- Branches: 37

Collection
- Items collected: Books, Newspaper, Periodicals, Braille Books, Paintings, Digital Media, Gramophone Records
- Size: 1.7M
- Legal deposit: National Depository Centre

Access and use
- Circulation: 1M
- Members: 1,59,000

Other information
- Budget: INR 139M
- Director: Dr. R. K. Sharma
- Employees: 214
- Website: www.dpl.gov.in

Delhi Public Library is a national depository library in the Indian Union Territory of Delhi. The library has 37 branches across the state.

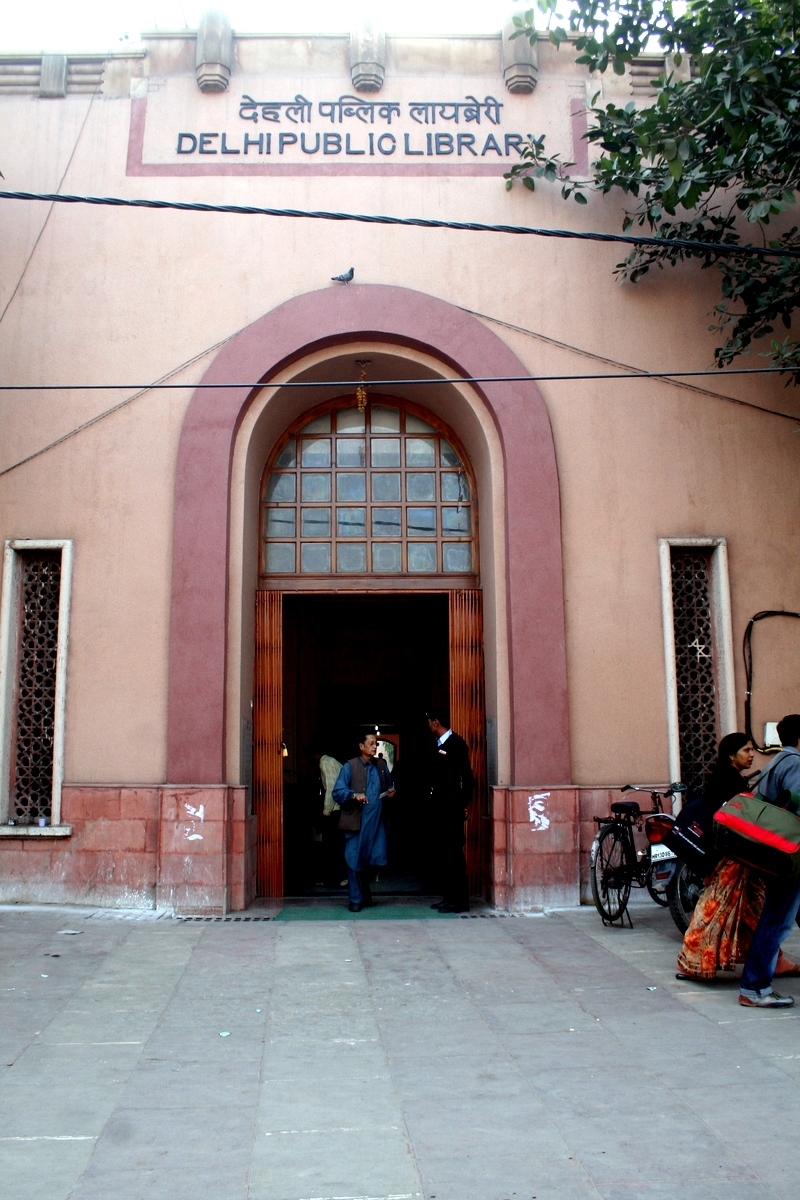
:Delhi Public Library building near old Delhi station

== History ==
The library was established on 27 October 1951 as a pilot project sponsored by UNESCO and the Government of India. The library project dates back to 1944, when Shri Ramkrishna Dalmia donated most of the amount required to construct a library building at the request of Gen. Sir Claude Auchinleck. In February 1950 the Indian Government and UNESCO agreed to initiate the project, and the library was officially opened on 27 October 1951, by then Prime Minister Jawaharlal Nehru. The library buildings were acquired between 1951 and 1953, with operations formally transferred from UNESCO to the Indian Government in 1955. The library provides training facilities to both student librarians and social education workers and has done so from its early days.

At present, The library network consists of a Central Library, 3 Branch Libraries, 20 Sub-Branch Libraries, 1 Community Library, 8 Resettlement Colony Libraries, One Braille Library, 100 Mobile Library Service Points (including 25 Braille Mobile library points) and 33 Deposit Stations in the Union Territory of Delhi Delhi & NCR.The Delhi Public Library has been one of the four recipient libraries under the Delivery of Books and Newspapers (Public Libraries) Act of the Parliament of India, 1954 (as amended in 1956). As per the provision of this act, the Delhi Public Library is entitled to receive one copy of each publication published in India from publishers free of cost.

== Facilities ==
The library has been expanding its services as a centre for the dissemination of knowledge, information and culture. It is increasingly felt that the library should not merely serve as a centre for lending books, but should also grow as a robust organization devoted to promote intellectual pursuits and create community rapport among its readers.

== Lending of Books ==
The issuing of books and other reading materials to its members is the main service offered by every branch. 1,65,854 registered members are utilizing this service as of 31 March 2021. In the Delhi Public Library system, books are issued to members for a maximum period of 14 days which may be further renewed for another 14 days, either in person or online. The Delhi Public Library catalog is published online, available for its users.
