= National Library and Documentation Services Board =

Sri Lankan government agency

Coordinates: 6°54′44.8″N 79°51′30.7″E

National Library and Documentation Services Board is the agency of the government of Sri Lanka which helps maintains all state libraries around the country including the Colombo Library but the management of individual libraries in cities and towns are carried out by the Municipal Council.

The National Library and Documentation Services Board was established under the act No: 51 of 1998 succeeding the Sri Lanka National Library Services Board which was established in 1970. The board is placed under the Ministry of Education. The present Board of Directors consists of 11 members including a full-time Chairman. The Director General is the chief executive and secretary of the Board.

== Aims and objectives ==
- To assess the need for library and documentation services among all sectors of the community and to promote the development of library and documentation services
- To administer, manage and control the affairs of the National Library and Documentation Centre
- To advise the authorities regarding plans, programmes and activities for the development of library and documentation services in Sri Lanka
- To provide leadership for libraries of all categories in Sri Lanka, leadership in providing information to the nation and for all services.
- Establishment, development and maintenance of a complete national collection of written, printed and non print media published in Sri Lanka or abroad.
- Establishment and maintenance of Bibliographic and Documentation Services.
- Advise the government on matters relevant to the Library and Information Science field.
- Organization of human resources and Promotion of physical resources for the development of libraries in Sri Lanka.
- Encourage the local book publication and promotion of reading.
- Encourage utilization of Information Technology for library and information services.
- Promote co-operation with the institutions and organizations at national, regional and international level related to library and information field.
- Organization of library and information services respecting to the cultural identity of different groups in the society.
- Provide resources and organize services needed for academic research activities.

== See also ==
- National Library of Sri Lanka
