= National Library of Sri Lanka =

Public library in Colombo, Sri Lanka

National Library of Sri Lanka is a research and a reference library, as well as the main library and information centre in Sri Lanka. It is located on Independence Avenue, Colombo.

== History ==
The idea of a National Library for Sri Lanka initially emerged in the 1950s, with a number of prominent scholars and Commission reports urging the respective national governments to consider the establishment of a national library. These included the Choksy Commission report on government services in 1955, the Kandiah Commission reports in 1958, and the Brohier report in 1959. In 1974 British architect, Michael Brawne (1925-2003) was commissioned by UNESCO to assist the National Library Services Board in preparing a design for the national library. A 1.11 ha (2.75 acres) site, adjoining the National Archives, on Independence Avenue, was identified and secured on 13 January 1976. Brawne worked closely with the Chief Architect, Panini Tennekoon, in the production of construction drawings for the library. The preliminary cost estimates were Rs. 9,000,000. Brawne visualised the building as "a big tree, a shelter from the elements, with its dominant feature a big overhanging roof."

Construction of the building began in 1976 for an estimated cost of Rs. 11,000,000 and an estimated completion within three years. The foundations and floor slab were constructed by the Ministry of Housing and Construction however due to the slow pace of construction a private contractor was engaged to complete the building by early 1982. Building activity ceased in late 1981 due to budgetary arrangements preventing any payment to the contractor. This was addressed in January 1982 however the contractor had committed to other building sites and was not able to substantially recommence works until September 1982. At that stage it was anticipated that the building would not be completed until March 1983. The library building was not finished until 1988 and formally opened by President Ranasinghe Premadasa on 27 April 1990.

== Architecture ==
The library has five floors with a total floor area of 11,250 m^{2} (121,100 sq ft) and 866 m (2,841 ft) of shelving. There are three reading areas with a seating capacity for 350 readers and several special study rooms, air conditioned auditorium with 145 seats and a conference room with 30 seats. Following its completion a new facilities have been added, including a book shop, additional auditorium, office space and storage facilities (amounting to a further 1,900 m^{2} (20,000 sq ft). In 2013 the library had over 1,000,000 volumes in stock.

The building is designed to maximise passive cooling and minimise the need for air conditioning, this is achieved by having an air conditioned core of book stacks, at the centre of the building, surrounded by wide naturally ventilated reading areas. The central book stacks ensures the best environmental conditions for the storage of the library's books and rare manuscripts. The reading areas are broken down into pairs of carrel desks each modelled on the dimensions of the façade elements. The grid of window mullions, solar shading and clerestory panels, provides the framework for the carrels, which then reflects the layout of the internal structural columns. A large projecting entrance canopy, extends to external pavement, providing protection for pedestrians from the sun and monsoonal rains, and opens up to an internal garden.

== See also ==
- List of libraries in Sri Lanka
- National Library and Documentation Services Board
