= D. S. Senanayake Memorial Public Library =

D.S. Senanayake Memorial Public Library
- ඩී. එස් සේනානායක අනුස්මරණ මහජන පුස්තකාලය
- 7.29201°N 80.63553°E
- Location: Kandy, Sri Lanka
- Type: Public library
- Established: 1841 as Central town library 1920 as D.S. Senanayake Memorial Public Library
- Branches: 8

Collection
- Items collected: Book Lending, Reference, Periodicals, News Papers, Mobile Library, Branch Libraries, Reading Rooms
- Size: 300,000

Access and use
- Members: 80,000

D.S. Senanayake Memorial Public Library is a public library in Kandy, Sri Lanka. It is the main public library in Kandy situated in Kandy town.

== History ==
D.S. Senanayake Memorial Public Library was initiated as Central Town Library in 1841 by a group of citizen for the benefit of the English educated local and foreign readers. In 1920 Kandy Municipal Council took charge of library and made it larger population to make use of its services.

The present D.S. Senanayake Memorial Public Library was started in 1962 by the Prime Minister Late Rt. D.S. Senanayake and the building was declared open by the then Governor Hon. William Gopallawa who was a former commissioner of the Kandy Municipal Council.

In 1989, auditorium was built with a seating capacity of 500, opened by the then Mayor His Worship Thilak Rathnayake to enhance the services of this Library.

In 1996, enlarge the floor area and enable the large readership to utilize the facilities, funding by the Japanese. The upper floor was completed in 2002 which was production of Central Provincial Council.
