= Copyright law of Sri Lanka =

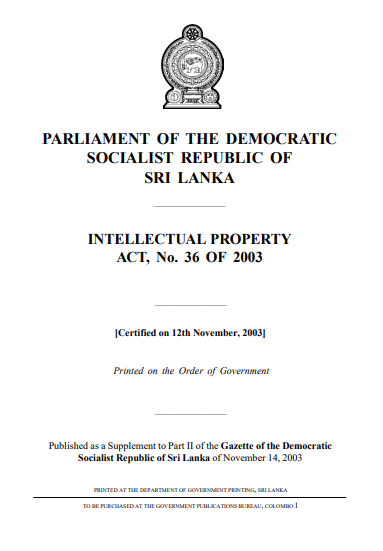
The Intellectual Property Act, No. 36 of 2003, which currently governs copyright in Sri Lanka

The basic legal instrument governing copyright law in Sri Lanka is Part II (ss. 5–27) of the Intellectual Property Act, No. 36 of 2003 (Sinhala: 2003 අංක 36 දරන බුද්ධිමය දේපල පනත; Tamil: 2003ஆம் ஆண்டின் 36ஆம் இலக்க புலமைச்சொத்து பாதுகாப்பு சட்டம்) replacing Part II (ss. 6–24) of the Code of Intellectual Property Act, No. 52 of 1979.

== Intellectual Property Act, No. 36 of 2003 ==
=== Objects of copyright ===
According to section 6 original intellectual creations in the literary, artistic and scientific domain are protected as works, in particular

- books, pamphlets, articles, computer programs and other writings
- speeches, lectures, addresses, sermons and other oral works
- dramatic, dramatic musical works, pantomimes, choreographic works and other works created for stage productions
- stage production of such works and expressions of folklore that are apt for such productions
- musical works
- audiovisual works
- works of architecture
- works of drawing, painting, sculpture, engraving, lithography, tapestry and other works of fine art
- photographic works
- works of applied art
- illustrations, maps, plans, sketches and three dimensional works relative to geography, topography, architecture or science

including transformations and modifications of works as well as collections (s. 7).

Excluded are (s. 8)

- ideas, concepts, principles etc.
- official texts of a legislative, administrative or legal nature as well as official translations thereof
- news of the day

Foreign works are covered by section 26 subsection (2).

=== Content and ownership of copyright: economic and moral rights ===
The owner of copyright has the exclusive right to carry out or to authorize the following acts in relation to the work (economic rights, s. 9):

- reproduction of the work
- translation of the work
- adaptation, arrangement or other transformation of the work
- the public distribution of the original and each copy of the work by sale, rental, export or otherwise
- rental of the original or a copy of an audiovisual work, a work embodied in a sound recording, a computer program, a data base or a musical work in the form of notation
- importation of copies of the work
- public display of the original or a copy of the work
- public performance of the work
- broadcasting of the work and
- other communication to the public of the work.

Protected is the entire work as well as a substantial part thereof.

The original owner of these economic rights is the author (exception: works for hire), in the case of an audiovisual work the producer (s. 14).

The owner of a copyright may

- grant licence to carry out all or any of the acts relating to the economic rights
- assign or transfer the economic rights in whole or in part (s. 16).

Furthermore, the author of a work enjoys the following moral rights (s. 10):

- to have his name indicated prominently on the copies and in connection with any public use of this work as far as practicable
- the right to use a pseudonym and not have his name indicated
- to object to any distortion, mutilation or other modification of or other derogatory action in relation or his work which would be prejudicial to his honour or reputation.

=== Limitation of copyright: fair use ===
Acts of fair use include inter alia (s. 12)

- private reproduction of a published work in a single copy
- reproduction in the form of a short quotation
- reproduction for teaching purposes
- single copies by libraries and archives of published articles, other short works or short extracts of a work as well as single copies for the purpose of preservation

=== Duration of copyright ===
The economic and moral rights are protected during the lifetime of the author and for a further period of 70 years from the date of his death (p.m.a.); a work of applied art is protected for 25 years from the date of the making of the work (s. 13).

=== Related rights ===
Related rights include the rights of performers (ss. 17, 19), the rights of producers of sound recordings (ss. 18, 19) and the rights of broadcasting organisations (s. 20), each of them having a duration of 50 years (limitations: s. 21).

=== Copyright infringement ===
When copyright is infringed, the Court has power and jurisdiction to grant injunctions, to order the impounding and destruction of illegal copies and to award damages (ss. 22, 170).

Copyright infringement may also lead to criminal charges (s. 178; accessories: s. 196; limitation: s. 202).
