= Kirilapone North =

Kirilapone North කිරුළපන උතුර கீறுளபொனே நார்த்
- Suburb
- Location within Sri Lanka
- Coordinates: 6°53′31″N 79°51′30″E
- Country: Sri Lanka
- Province: Western Province
- District: Colombo District
- Time zone: UTC+5:30 (Sri Lanka Standard Time Zone)
- Postal Code: 00500

Kirilapone North is a suburb of Colombo, Sri Lanka.
