= Sri Lankan monarchs =

Sri Lanka has been ruled by various monarchial lines, at some times with different lines ruling different parts of the modern state, or the entire state.

The Sinhalese monarchy was established in 543 BC with Prince Vijaya founding the Kingdom of Tambapanni and ended with Sri Vickrama Rajasinghe of Kandy in 1815 with the signing of the Kandyan Convention. This is a list of all those who have reigned, in each of the successive Sinhala Kingdoms. The list of Sinhalese monarchs was recorded in the chronicles of the island such as the Deepavamsa, Mahavamsa, Chulavamsa and the Rajaveliya. This line of rulership contained both native Sinhalese and foreign rulers who ruled chronologically and in succession under the Sinhalese Monarchy.

In 1215, the invasion of Kalinga Magha led to the establishment of a line of monarchs of the Jaffna kingdom, who ruled a portion of Sri Lanka until the Kotte conquest of Jaffna Kingdom and the annexation of it into the Sinhalese kingdom, later the Portuguese captured the reestablished kingdom from Cankili II 1619.

In 1796 the British first entered the island and gained control of the coastal areas from the Dutch. After the Kandyan Wars and the signing of the Kandyan Convention in 1815 the sovereignty of the kingdom of Kandy was vested in the British Monarch, which ended 2357 years of native Sri Lankan monarchy. Ceylon gained independence from Britain in 1948, and remained a monarchy until 1972.

== Lists of monarchs ==
- Monarchs of the Sinhala kingdom
- Monarchs of the Jaffna kingdom
- Monarchs of the Dominion of Ceylon
