= National Museum Library =

- 6.910700465537761°N 79.8614216512089°E
- Location: Colombo, Sri Lanka
- Established: 1877

Other information

The National Museum Library is a division of the Department of National Museum in Sri Lanka functioning as its library and archive for its collection of books and documents. Established on 1 January 1877 as the Colombo National Museum Library when the Colombo National Museum was established, it incorporated the Government Oriental Library that had been established in 1870. Since 1885, by law, a copy of every document printed in the country is required to be lodged with the museum library as it functioned as the oldest legal deposit in Sri Lanka.

== Collection ==
At present the library accommodates over 12 million titles including the broad classifications of:

- Arts and humanities: Archaeology, Ethnology, Anthropology, Oriental Languages and Literature;
- Natural Sciences: Zoology, Entomology, Geology and Botany;

Document types include:

- Palm leaves inscribed in Sinhala, Pali, Sanskrit, Burmese, Telugu and Tamil characters. Subjects covered include Buddhism, Sinhala literature, History, Medicine, Astrology, Demonology, Veterinary Science, Art, Architecture and Folklore.
- Printed books and pamphlets, including all locally published works since 1737.
- Periodicals, local and foreign;
- Government publications including Blue Books from 1864–1938, Administration Reports, Sessional Papers, Hansards, etc.;
- Directories, statistical year books, trade catalogues, etc.;
- Law reports.
- Maps and drawings;
- Stamps and postcards.

=== Special collections ===
The library holds the private collections of H. C. P. Bell, Hugh Nevill, and the palm-leaf manuscript collection of Dr. W. A. de Silva. Sir Solomon Dias Bandaranike donated Henry Arthur Blake’s collection of palm-leaf manuscripts. A collection of Sinhala periodicals and newspapers was acquired from Ven. Kalukodayawa Pannasekera Maha Thero.

== Services of the library ==
Library services include:

- Reference services
- Reader advisory services
- Inquiry services
- Content pages services and current awareness services
- Reprographic services (provision of microforms, photocopies and photographs)
- Short reading lists are prepared on request
- Postal and telephone inquiries received by the library
- Newspaper clipping service

== See also ==
- National Library of Sri Lanka
- Colombo National Museum
