= Vishtasp Kairshasp Choksy =

Sri Lankan lawyer and President's Counsel

Vishtasp Kairshasp Choksy PC
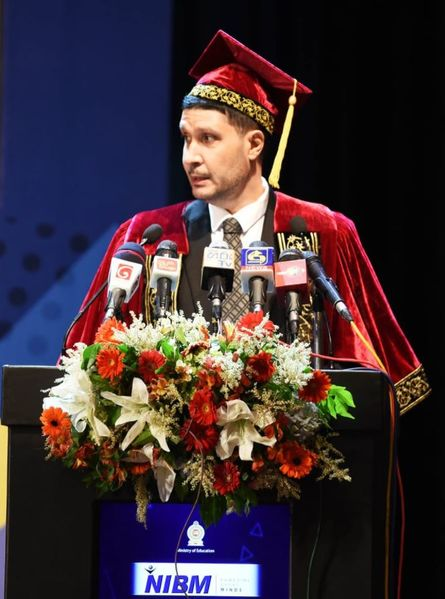

Chairman of National Institute of Business Management (Sri Lanka)

Personal details
- Born: 22 December 1969 (age 56) Colombo, Sri Lanka
- Spouse(s): Sirini Choksy (née Ratnayake)
- Children: Shanaia, Arish & Anaisha
- Education: S. Thomas' Preparatory School; Colombo International School; Sri Lanka Law College
- Profession: President's Counsel & Lawyer

Vishtasp Kairshasp Choksy (born 22 December 1969) (known as V.K Choksy) is a Sri Lankan Lawyer and advisor. He is a Civil Lawyer and appointed President's Counsel. Choksy belongs to an influential family and is the son of politician and lawyer K. N. Choksy P.C. His expertise in resolving legal disputes and issues for government organisations as well as private clients are remarkable. Choksy was one of the active members and contributed the best of his knowledge in the constitutional challenge to the dissolution of Parliament in 2018.

He is also chairman of National Institute of Business Management (Sri Lanka) and director at NSBM. He is a Member of the National Intellectual Property Commission, and Legal Advisor to Mahapola Higher Education Scholarship Trust Fund. A member of the Finance Ministry Compensation Tribunal, A Trustee of the Pragna Bandu Trust Fund & a Member of the Political Vicitimasation Committee. He is also a Director of the Road Development Authority (R.D.A..)He had led several notable cases at state and federal courts. Choksy has been widely recognized for his involvement in the supreme court cases and was appointed as the President's Counsel under the Article 33 of the Constitution of Sri Lanka.

Choksy has held positions at a companies including Golden Key Credit Card, Abans Finance PLC, Advantage Ltd and NIBM. In 1993 he won the Merit Prize for Professional Ethics and Accountancy.

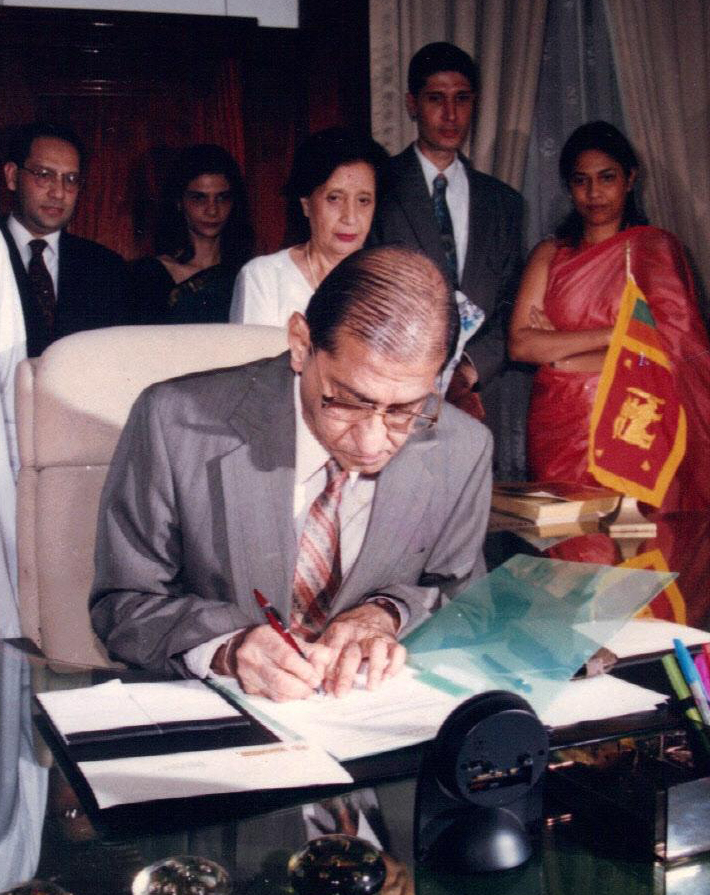
Vishtasp & his wife Sirini with his father K. N. Choksy & mother Freny Choksy

== Early life and education ==
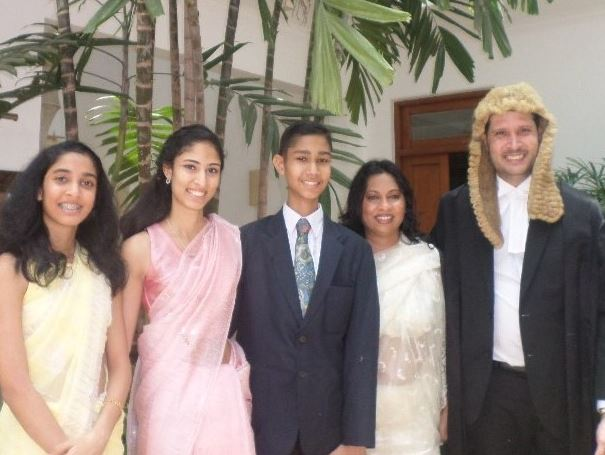
Vishtasp Kairshasp Choksy with wife Sirini, daughters Shanaia & Anaisha and son Arish

Choksy was born in Colombo on 22 December 1969. He is from an influential family of lawyers in Sri Lanka and is the grandson of N. K. Choksy Q.C.and son of K. N. Choksy. Choksy's father was a member of the Parliament of Sri Lanka and Cabinet Minister of Finance under Prime Minister Ranil Wickremasinghe. He grew up with two siblings.

Choksy completed his primary education from S. Thomas' Preparatory School, and then enrolled in the Colombo International School. As a teenager, Choksy decided to pursue law. He studied at Sri Lanka Law College.

== Career ==
He started his career as a lawyer right after completing graduation from law school. He apprenticed with Romesh De Silva P.C. and started working with him after finishing college. Since 1993, Choksy has been practicing law, with a specialty in Civil Law.

== Awards ==
Choksy is the recipient of The Merit Prize for Professional Ethics and Accountancy, 1993 and Mahapola Award Scholarship at the Sri Lanka Law College Entrance Examination. Over 30 years has had an active participation in The District Courts, Commercial High Courts, Civil Appellate High Courts, Court of Appeal and Supreme Court. He specializes in handling commercial cases and has worked for a number of corporate clients.

== Family ==
Choksy is married to Sirini Ratnayake, a Lawyer. The couple has three children, two daughters and one son. Choksy speaks fluent English and Sinhala. He is a Zoroastrian Parsee from ancient Persian descent. Choksy is a vegetarian because of his compassion for animals.
