= Department of National Archives =

- ජාතික ලේඛනාරක්ෂණ දෙපාර්තමේන්තුව தேசிய சுவடிகள் காப்பக திணைக்களம்

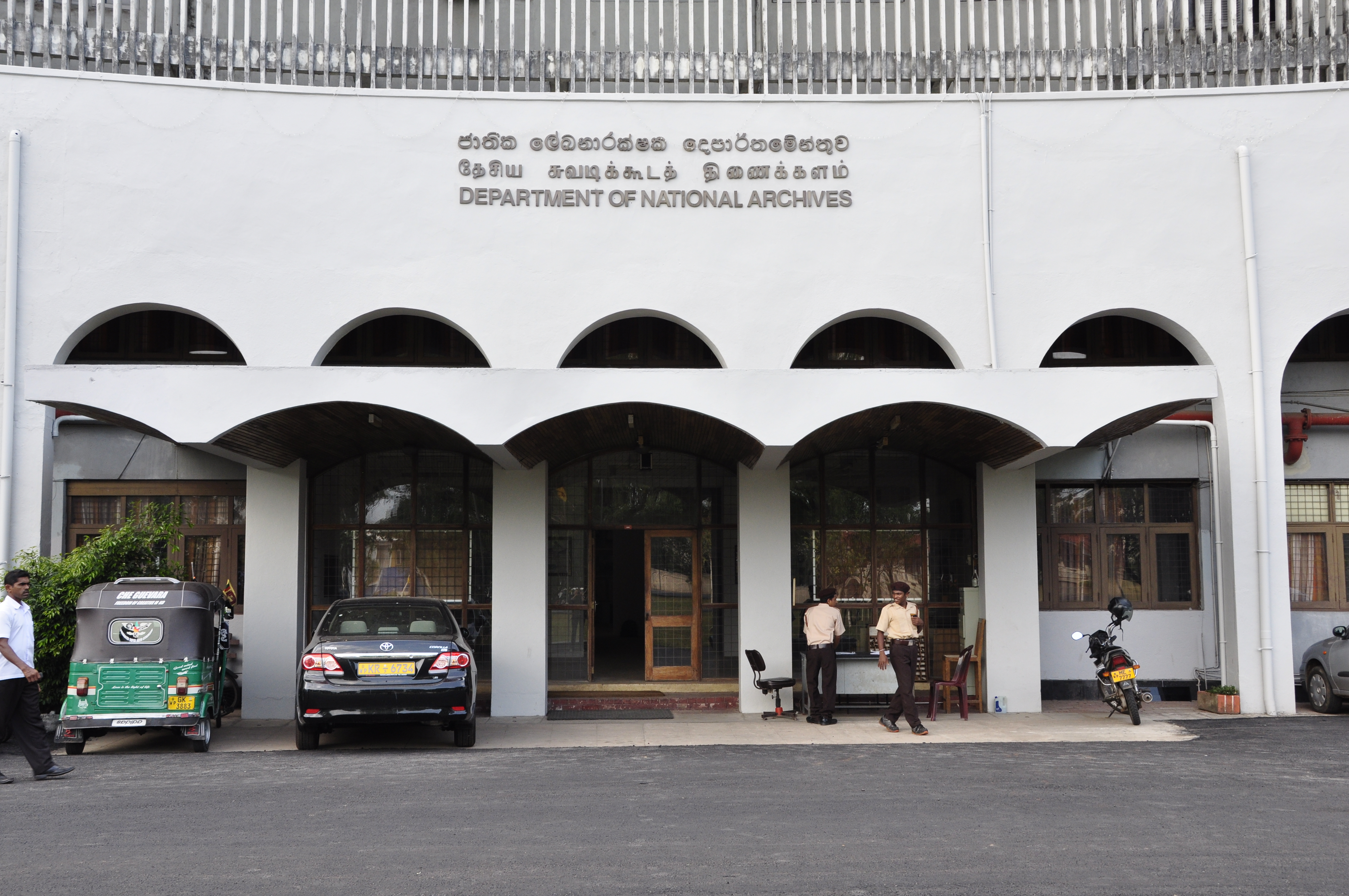
- Main entrance to the National Archives in Colombo

Agency overview
- Formed: October 1, 1966; 59 years ago
- Preceding agencies: Department of the Government Archivist (1947-1966); Archivist, Chief Secretary’s Office (1901-1947); Keeper of Dutch Records (1803-1901); Colonial Secretary of Ceylon (custodian of official records; c.1798-?)
- Jurisdiction: Government of Sri Lanka
- Headquarters: Philip Gunawardena mawatha, Colombo 7; 6.906767°N 79.864730°E
- Motto: Committed to preserving the memory of the Nation
- Employees: 119 (2016)
- Annual budget: Rs 333 million (2016)
- Agency executive: Dr Nadeera Rupesinghe, Director General
- Parent agency: Ministry of Higher Education and Cultural Affairs
- Key document: National Archives Law, No. 48 of 1973
- Website: archives.gov.lk

The Department of National Archives (Sinhala: ජාතික ලේඛනාරක්ෂණ දෙපාර්තමේන්තුව jāthika lēkhanārakshana depārthamēnthuwa) is a government department in Sri Lanka which is the repository of the non-current records of the Government of Sri Lanka. The headquarters of the National Archives is situated along Reid Avenue, near Independence Square, Colombo and has a branch office in Kandy.

== History ==
The current department operates under the provisions of the National Archives Law No. 48 of 1973, and National Archives (Amendment) Act No. 30 of 1981. The duties of archivists in Sri Lanka can be traced back to the ancient Sri Lankan Kingdoms dating as far back as 3rd century BC, when officers were appointed to maintain royal archives of Sri Lankan monarchs. In the 19th century, Hay Macdowall noted the existence of Maha Mohotti within the Kandyan Court responsible for the maintenance of the Court archives during the 18th and 19th centuries.

Modern archiving in the country began when the Dutch established archives in Galle. The current department was formed with the creation of the post of Government Archivist in 1901 by the Government of Ceylon, as part of the Chief Secretary's Office (also known as the Colonial Secretary). R.G. Anthonisz was appointed the first Government Archivist in 1902. The Department of the Government Archivist was formally established in 1947 and, following the enactment of the National Archives Law No. 48 of 1973, was renamed Department of National Archives.

== Records ==
Records held in the Department of National Archives include those of the Portuguese-, Dutch- (Land Tombo, Head Tombo and School Tombo Council Minutes and practically all records of the Dutch administration on the island) and British periods, copies of Crown Grants, Grain Tax Registers, Nila Pangu- & Praveni Pangu registers, as well as records since independence 1948, including those of Government-, Semi Government- and other institutions.

Apart from these there is a large collection of donated or purchased papers, manuscripts and books from institutions and individuals such as the Horagolla library (part of the Bandaranaike estate), the Times of Ceylon Collection and Buddhist temples. Collections of election literature, maps of the island (both colonial maps and post-independence Surveyor General's maps), government publications such as pre-independence Ordinances (1796-1947), Government Gazettes, Blue Books (1821-1937), Sessional Papers (1860 onward), Administration Reports (1867 onward) and Hansard reports (1870 onward) also form part of the Archives' stock.

== Heads of Department ==
=== Government Archivist ===
- R.G. Anthonisz, ISO, JP (1902–1921)
- Edmund Reimers, MBE (1921–1940)
- J. H. 0. Paulusz (1940–1958)

== See also ==
- List of national archives
